= Guy Laporte (actor) =

French actor (1948–2019)

- Born: 11 March 1948; Angers, France
- Died: 11 December 2019 (aged 71)
- Occupation: Actor

Guy Laporte (11 March 1948 – 11 December 2019) was a French actor.

== Biography ==
Laporte performed the majority of his acts at Le Splendid, a café-théâtre in Paris. Most notably, he played a village chief in French Fried Vacation. He collaborated multiple times with Marc Jolivet.

Guy Laporte died on 11 December 2019 from Charcot–Marie–Tooth disease, which he had been fighting for two years.

== Filmography ==
- French Fried Vacation (1978)
- French Fried Vacation 2 (1979)
- Pierrot mon ami (1979)
- Alors... Heureux ? (1980)
- Viens chez moi, j'habite chez une copine (1980)
- Les Charlots contre Dracula (1980)
- Ma femme s'appelle reviens (1982)
- Le Voyageur imprudent (1982)
- Circulez y'a rien à voir (1983)
- Pinot simple flic (1984)
- Marche à l'ombre (1984)
- Subway (1984)
- Moi vouloir toi (1985)
- Nuit d'ivresse (1986)
- Le Beauf (1986)
- Une époque formidable… (1991)
- A Mere Mortal (1991)
- Dead Tired (1994)
- Un homme digne de confiance (1997)
- Concours de danse à Piriac (2006)
