= Théâtre de la Michodière =

Theatre in Paris, France

Coordinates: 48.8692°N 2.3347°E

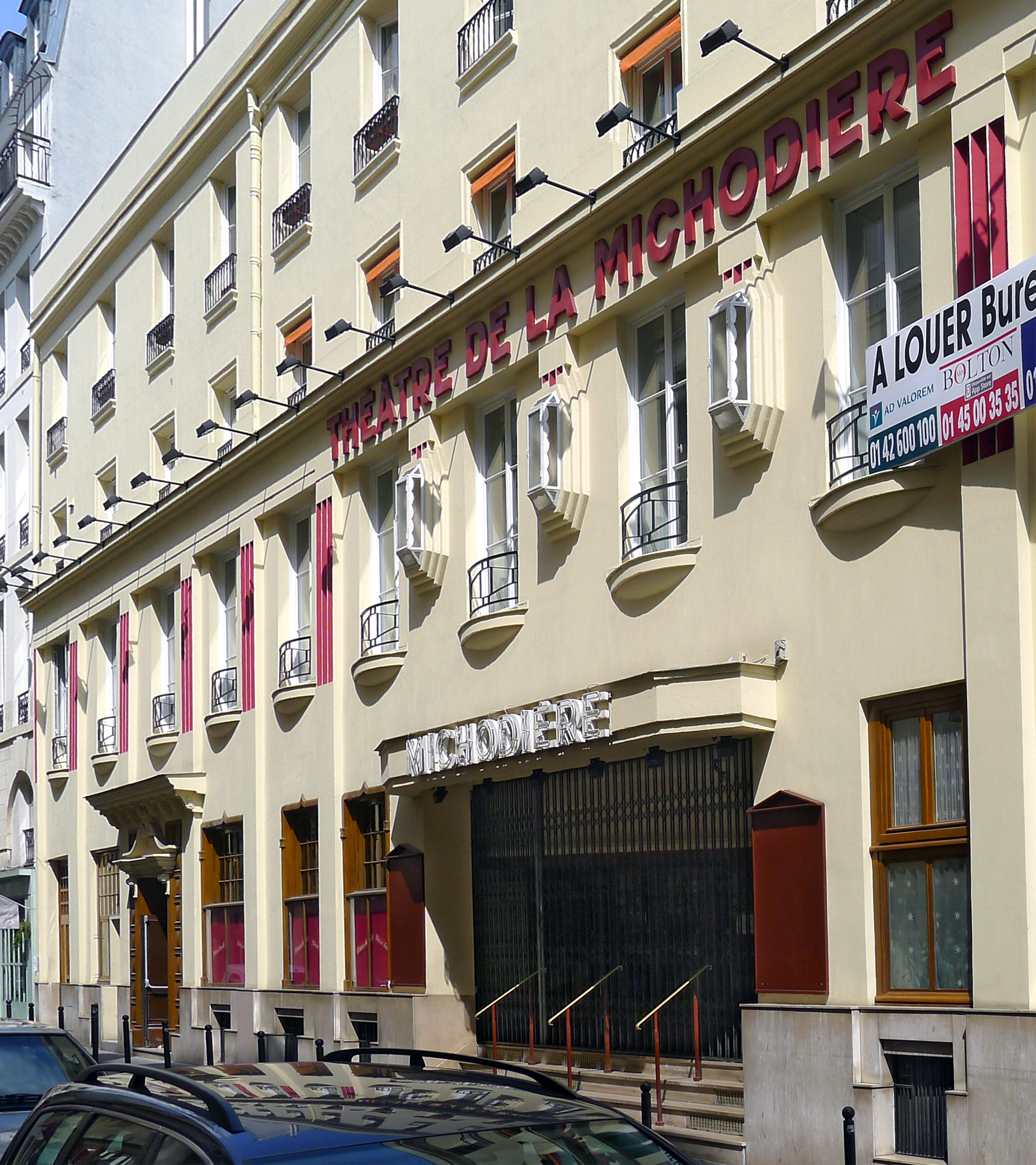
- The entrance on 13 July 2015
- Interactive map of the Théâtre de la Michodière area

General information
- Location: Rue de la Michodière, 2nd arrondissement of Paris, France
- Inaugurated: 1925

Design and construction
- Architect: Auguste Bluysen

Other information
- Seating capacity: 700

Website
- www.michodiere.com

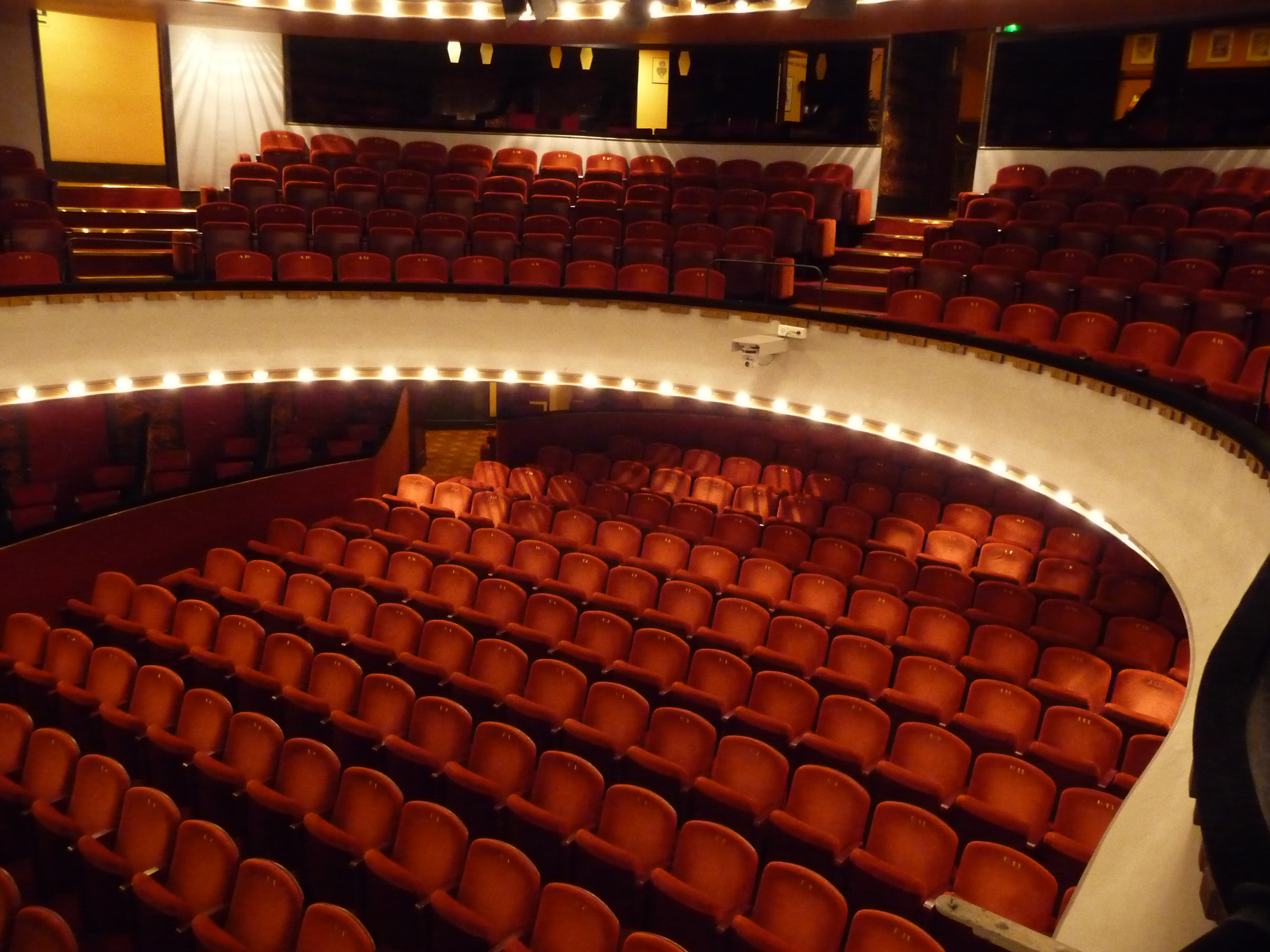
Interior of the Théâtre de la Michodière

The Théâtre de la Michodière (French pronunciation: [teɑtʁ də la miʃɔdjɛʁ]) is a theatre building and performing arts venue, located at 4 bis, rue de La Michodière in the 2nd arrondissement of Paris. Built by Auguste Bluysen in 1925 in Art Deco style, it has a tradition of showing boulevard theatre.

== History ==
On the site of the Hotel de Lorge, sold in lots, the rue de la Michodiere opened in 1778. Around the place where the Gaillon gate stood at the enclosure of Louis XIII, in 1925, the architect Auguste Bluysen built a theatre in the Art Deco style. Decorated by Jacques-Émile Ruhlmann, the red and gold auditorium could accommodate 800 spectators, but in the 21st century, it has only 700 seats left.

Unlike the West End, where the activities of "bricks and mortar" and producers tend to be separate, Parisian commercial theatres are producing houses. Management decides on the artistic policy, and shows are financed by the theatre, albeit sometimes in co-production with a touring management that hopes to profit from a Parisian success to take a show out on tour.

Inaugurated on 16 November 1925 under the management of Gustave Quinson, from 1927 to 1977 it was run by actor-managers who made the success of its shows: Victor Boucher, Yvonne Printemps, Pierre Fresnay, François Périer, with works by Édouard Bourdet, André Roussin, Jean Anouilh, Marcel Achard and Françoise Dorin. By public demand, the theatre specialised in boulevard plays, as evidenced by the many old posters that could be seen on its walls. The theatre was co-directed by Fresnay and Printemps until his death in 1975. Printemps remained alone at the head of the theatre, until she died in 1977.

The theatre went into receivership, and after a brief period of being run by ATECA association, was bought from the receivers in September 1981 by Jacques Crepineau, who, unlike his predecessors, was not an actor, but still performed the role of artistic director.

In April 2014, vente-privee.com bought the theatre.
Richard Caillat and Stéphane Hillel were nominated as co-directors.

In November 2019, Fimalac Entertainment bought a majority shareholding in the theatre.

In January 2022, Marc Lesage took over from Stéphane Hillel to become co-director with Richard Caillat.

== Repertoire ==
=== Management by Gustave Quinson ===
- 1925: L'Infidèle éperdue by Jacques Natanson, 16 November
- Le Greluchon délicat by Jacques Natanson, 17 December
- 1926: Passionnément 3-act operetta by Maurice Hennequin and Albert Willemetz, music by André Messager, 15 January
- 1926: Le Temps d'aimer by Pierre Wolff, Henri Duvernois, couplets Hugues Delorme, music Reynaldo Hahn, 6 November

=== Management by Victor Boucher ===
- 1927: Son mari, three-act comedy by Paul Géraldy and Robert Spitzer, 4 March
- 1927: L'Enlèvement de Paul Armont and Marcel Gerbidon, 6 September
- 1927: Vient de paraître 4-act comedy by Édouard Bourdet, directed by Victor Boucher, 25 November
- 1928: Sur mon beau navire, three-act comedy by Jean Sarment, 30 November
- 1929: Le Trou dans le mur, 4-act comedy by Yves Mirande, 1 February
- 1929: La Vie de château, 3-act comedy by Ferenc Molnár, 29 May
- 1929: L'Ascension de Virginie 3-act comedy by Maurice Donnay and Pierre Descaves, 28 September
- 1929: Le Sexe faible, 3-act comedy by Édouard Bourdet, 10 December
- 1932: La Banque Nemo, play in 3 acts and 9 tableaux by Louis Verneuil, 21 November
- 1932: La Fleur des pois 4-act comedy by Édouard Bourdet, 4 October
- 1933: Le Vol nuptial 3-act comedy by Francis de Croisset, 1 April
- 1934: Les Temps difficiles 4-act play by Édouard Bourdet, 30 January
- 1934: Les Vignes du seigneur by Robert de Flers and Francis de Croisset,
- 1934: Do, Mi, Sol, Do 3-act comedy by Paul Géraldy, 21 December
- 1935: Bichon 4-act play by Jean de Létraz, 3 May
- 1936: Fric-Frac 5-act play by Édouard Bourdet, 15 October
- 1937: Bureau central des idées, one-act comedy by Alfred Gehri, directed by Louis Tunc, 24 April
- 1937 : Les Vignes du seigneur by Robert de Flers and Francis de Croisset,

=== Management by Victor Boucher and Yvonne Printemps ===
- 1938: Le Valet maître by Paul Armont and Léopold Marchand, directed by Pierre Fresnay, 1 March
- 1939: Trois Valses by Léopold Marchand and Albert Willemetz, directed by Pierre Fresnay, June
- 1940: La Familiale by Jean de Létraz, with François Périer, 9 February
- 1940: Léocadia by Jean Anouilh, 28 November
- 1940: Histoire de rire by Armand Salacrou, directed by Alice Cocéa
- 1941: Hyménée, four-act play by Édouard Bourdet, 7 May

=== Management by Pierre Fresnay and Yvonne Printemps ===
- 1941: Comédie en trois actes, by Henri-Georges Clouzot,
- 1942: Père, by Édouard Bourdet, 15 December
- 1943: Le Voyageur sans bagage, play in five tableaux by Jean Anouilh, 1 April
- 1944: Le Dîner de famille, three-act play by Jean Bernard-Luc, directed by Jean Wall, 1 December
- 1944: Père, by Édouard Bourdet,
- 1945: Vient de paraître, by Édouard Bourdet,
- 1946: Auprès de ma blonde by Marcel Achard, directed by Pierre Fresnay, 7 May
- 1946: Si je voulais… by Paul Géraldy and Robert Spitzer
- 1947: Le Prince d'Aquitaine, three-act comedy Marcel Thiébaut, May
- 1947: Savez-vous planter les choux ?, by Marcel Achard, directed by Pierre Fresnay, 25 September
- 1948: K.M.X labrador, by Jacques Deval after H. W. Reed, directed by the author, 29 January
- 1948: Pauline ou l'Écume de la mer, two-act play by Gabriel Arout, 17 June
- 1948: Du côté de chez Proust, by Curzio Malaparte, 22 November
- 1948: Les Œufs de l'autruche by André Roussin, directed by Pierre Fresnay, 22 November
- 1949: L'École des dupes, 1-act comedy by André Roussin, directed by the author, 2 June
- 1950: Bobosse by André Roussin, directed by the author, 14 March
- 1951: Le Moulin de la galette, three-act play by Marcel Achard, directed by Pierre Fresnay, 17 December
- 1952: Hyménée, by Édouard Bourdet,
- 1952: Un beau dimanche, play in three-act and five tableaux by Jean-Pierre Aumont, after the novel Rencontre by Pierre Larthomas, 29 June
- 1953: Le Ciel de lit play in three-act and six tableaux by Jan de Hartog, directed by Pierre Fresnay, 14 April
- 1953: Histoire de rire, by Armand Salacrou
- 1954: Les Cyclones, by Jules Roy, directed by Pierre Fresnay, 10 September
- 1954: Voici le jour, three-act play by Jean Lasserre, with Pierre Fresnay, 22 April
- 1955: Les Grands Garçons, by Paul Géraldy,
- 1955: Les Œufs de l'autruche, by André Roussin, directed by Pierre Fresnay, 10 March
- 1955: Le Mal d'amour by Marcel Achard, directed by François Périer

=== Management Pierre Fresnay, Yvonne Printemps and François Périer ===
- 1956: Le Séducteur, three-act comedy by Diego Fabbri, directed by François Périer, 13 January
- 1956: Le Voyage à Turin, four-act comedy by André Lang, 12 September
- 1957: Bille en tête, by Roland Laudenbach, directed by Jean-Jacques Varoujean, 19 February by Jean-Louis Roncoroni, directed by Georges Douking, 29 April
- Bobosse by André Roussin, directed by the author, 10 September
- 1958: Père by Édouard Bourdet, directed by Pierre Fresnay, 9 September
- 1959: Gog et Magog, by Roger MacDougall and Ted Allan, translation Gabriel Arout, directed by François Périer, 3 September
- 1962: Johnnie Cœur, by Romain Gary, directed by François Périer, 10 September
- 1963: Le Neveu de Rameau, by Denis Diderot, directed by Jacques-Henri Duval, 4 February
- 1963: L’Équation ou Une heure avec Monsieur Zweistein, by Jacques Perry, 4 February
- 1963: L'Homme et la perruche, by Alain Allioux, 28 September
- 1964: La Preuve par quatre, by Félicien Marceau, directed by the author, 4 February
- 1965: La Preuve par quatre, by Félicien Marceau, directed by the author, April
- 1966: L'Idée fixe, by Paul Valéry, directed by Pierre Franck, 17 January
- 1966: Laurette ou l'Amour voleur, three-act comedy by Marcelle Maurette and Marc-Gilbert Sauvajon, directed by Pierre Fresnay, 4 October

=== Management by Pierre Fresnay, Yvonne Printemps ===
- 1967: Comme au théâtre, by Françoise Dorin, directed by Michel Roux, 2 February
- 1968: Le Truffador, by Jean Canolle, directed by the author, 8 February
- 1968: Visitations, by Jean Giraudoux, 15 June
- 1968: Gugusse, by Marcel Achard, directed by Michel Roux 7 September
- 1969: La Tour d'Einstein by Christian Liger, directed by Pierre Fresnay and Julien Bertheau, 10 January
- 1969: La Paille humide, by Albert Husson, Michel Roux, 20 February
- 1969: On ne sait jamais, by André Roussin, directed by the author, 12 September
- 1970: Une poignée d'orties, by Marc-Gilbert Sauvajon, directed by Jacques-Henri Duva], 4 September
- 1970: Le Procès Karamazov by Diego Fabbri after Dostoievski, directed by Pierre Franck, 15 October
- 1970: L'Idée fixe, by Paul Valéry, directed by Pierre Franck
- 1970: Jeu, set et match by Anthony Shaffer, directed by Clifford Williams, 18 December
- 1971: Et alors ? by Bernard Haller, 9 September
- 1971: Mon Faust by Paul Valéry, directed by Pierre Franck
- 1971: Le Client by Jean-Claude Carrière, directed by the author
- 1972: Et alors ? by Bernard Haller, 1 August
- 1972: La Claque by André Roussin, directed by the author, 17 October
- 1973: L'Arnacœur by Pierrette Bruno, directed by Pierre Mondy, 10 October
- 1975: Les Diablogues by Roland Dubillard, directed by Jean Chouquet, 10 January
- 1975: Gog et Magog by Roger MacDougall and Ted Allan, directed by François Périer,
- 1976: Voyez-vous ce que je vois ? and Ray Cooney and John Chapman, directed by Jean Le Poulain, 19 February
- 1976: Acapulco Madame by Yves Jamiaque, directed by Yves Gasc, September
- 1977: Pauvre Assassin by Pavel Kohout, directed by Michel Fagadau, 30 September
- 1978: Les Rustres after Carlo Goldoni, directed by Claude Santelli, 31 January
- 1979: Coup de chapeau by Bernard Slade, adaptation by Pierre Barillet and Jean-Pierre Gredy, directed by Pierre Mondy, with François Périer, Daniel Auteuil, 6 September

=== Management by Jacques Crépineau ===
- 1981: Mademoiselle by Jacques Deval, directed by Jean Meyer, 25 September
- 1981: Amusez-vous... Ah ces années 30 by and directed by Jacques Décombe, 2 November
- 1982: La Pattemouille by Michel Lengliney, directed by Jean-Claude Islert, 21 January
- 1982: Joyeuses Pâques by Jean Poiret, directed by Pierre Mondy, 15 April
- 1983: Le Vison voyageur by Ray Cooney and John Chapman, directed by Jacques Sereys, 13 January (photos sur Gallica)
- 1984: Banco ! by Alfred Savoir, directed by Robert Manuel, 26 January
- 1984: J'ai deux mots à vous dire by Jean-Pierre Delage, directed by Pierre Mondy, 30 March
- 1984: Le Bluffeur de Marc Camoletti, directed by the author, 9 November (photos sur Gallica)
- 1986: La Prise de Berg-Op-Zoom by Sacha Guitry, directed by Jean Meyer, 18 January
- 1986: Double mixte by Ray Cooney, directed by Pierre Mondy 7 November (photos sur Gallica)
- 1988: Lamy Public N°1 by and with André Lamy, 15 January
- 1988: Ma cousine de Varsovie by Georges Berr and Louis Verneuil, directed by Jean-Claude Islert, 21 June (photos sur Gallica
- 1989: Pâquerette by Claude Magnier, directed by Francis Perrin, 21 January (photos sur Gallica)
- 1989: Pièce détachée by Alan Ayckbourn, directed by Bernard Murat, 8 October
- 1990: Une journée chez ma mère by Bruno Gaccio, Charlotte de Turckheim, directed by Jacques Décombe, 23 March
- 1990: Tiercé gagnant by John Chapman, adaptation Stewart Vaughan and Jean-Claude Islert, directed by Christopher Renshaw, 21 September
- 1991: Le Gros n'avion by Michèle Bernier, Isabelle de Botton, Mimie Mathy (les filles), directed by Éric Civanyan, 21 January
- 1991: Tromper n'est pas jouer by Patrick Cargill, adaptation Jean-François Stévenin and Daniel Colas, directed by Daniel Colas, 4 July
- 1991: Pleins Feux by Mary Orr, adaptation Didier Kaminka, directed by Éric Civanyan, 26 September
- 1992: Je veux faire du cinéma by Neil Simon, directed by Michel Blanc, 15 January
- 1992: La Puce à l'oreille by Georges Feydeau, directed by Jean-Claude Brialy, 17 June
- 1993: Partenaires by David Mamet, directed by Bernard Stora, 4 March
- 1993: Les Palmes de monsieur Schutz by Jean-Noël Fenwick, directed by Gérard Caillaud, 10 July
- 1994: La Fille à la trompette by Jacques Rampal, directed by Gérard Caillaud, with Jean-Marc Thibault, 22 February
- 1994: Bobosse by André Roussin, directed by Stéphane Hillel, 19 May
- 1994: Les Crachats de la Lune by Gildas Bourdet, directed by Jean-Michel Lahmi, 15 September
- 1994: L'Hôtel du libre échange by Georges Feydeau, directed by Franck Lapersonne, 24 November
- 1995: Le Vison voyageur by Ray Cooney, directed by Patrick Guillemin, 27 May
- 1995: Le Surbook by Danielle Ryan and Jean-François Champion 17 October
- 1996: Un grand cri d'amour by Josiane Balasko, directed by the author, with Richard Berry and Josiane Balasko, 15 January
- 1996: Ciel ma mère ! by Clive Exton, adaptation Michèle Laroque and Dominique Deschamps, directed by Jean-Luc Moreau, 12 July
- 1996: Vacances de Reve by Francis Joffo, directed by Francis Joffo, 20 September
- 1997: revival of Un grand cri d'amour by Josiane Balasko, directed by the author, with Richard Berry and Josiane Balasko, 14 January
- 1997: Branquignol, 20 May
- 1997: Les Palmes de monsieur Schutz by Jean-Noël Fenwick, directed by Gérard Caillaud, 1 July
- 1997: Espèces menacées by Ray Cooney adaptation Gérard Jugnot, Michel Blanc, Stewart Vaughan directed by Éric Civanyan, with Gérard Jugnot, Martin Lamotte, 9 October to 31 May 1998
- 1998: continuation of Espèces menacées, 25 September 1998 to 9 January 1999
- 1999: continuation of Espèces menacées, with cast change, 15 January to 4 July
- 1999: continuation of Espèces menacées, with second cast change, 23 September
- 2000: Moi, mais en mieux, by Jean-Noël Fenwick, directed by Jean-Claude Idée, 20 January
- 2001: Les Désirs sauvages de mon mari by John Tobias, adaptation Sally Micaleff, directed by Éric Civanyan, 8 February
- 2001: Moi, mais en mieux by Jean-Noël Fenwick, directed by Jean-Claude Idée, 3 May
- 2001: Impair et père by Ray Cooney, adaptation Stewart Vaughan and Jean-Christophe Barc, directed by Jean-Luc Moreau, with Roland Giraud, 8 November
- 2003: Un homme parfait by Michel Thibaud, directed by Jean-Pierre Dravel and Olivier Macé, 18 January
- 2003: Tout bascule by Olivier Lejeune, directed by the author, 3 July
- 2003: Daddy Blues by Martyne Visciano and Bruno Chapelle, directed by Éric Civanyan, 9 October
- 2004: L'Éloge de ma paresse by Maria Pacôme, directed by Agnès Boury, 24 January
- 2004: Ciel ! Mon Feydeau ! after Georges Feydeau, adaptation Anthéa Sogno, directed by Anthéa Sogno, 14 April
- 2004: Le Canard à l'orange by William Douglas Home, adaptation Marc-Gilbert Sauvajon, directed by Gérard Caillaud, 7 October
- 2005: Stationnement Alterné by Ray Cooney, adaptation Stewart Vaughan and Jean-Christophe Barc, directed by Jean-Luc Moreau, with Eric Metayer, Roland Marchisio, 6 October
- 2006: Délit de Fuites by Jean-Claude Islert, directed by Jean-Luc Moreau, 5 October
- 2007: Chat et Souris by Ray Cooney, adaptation Stewart Vaughan and Jean-Christophe Barc, directed by Jean-Luc Moreau, with Francis Perrin, Jean-Luc Moreau, 20 September
- 2009: continuation of Chat et Souris with cast change, 23 January
- 2009: Goodbye Charlie by George Axelrod, adaptation Dominique Deschamps and Didier Caron, directed by Didier Caron, with Marie-Anne Chazel, Éric Laugerias, 4 September
- 2009 : Désiré by Sacha Guitry, directed by Serge Lipszyc, with Robin Renucci, Marianne Basler, 8 December
- 2010: À deux lits du délit by Derek Benfield, adaptation Stewart Vaughan and Jean-Christophe Barc, directed by Jean-Luc Moreau, with Arthur Jugnot, Garnier et Sentou, 16 September
- 2011: De filles en aiguilles by Robin Hawdon, adaptation Stewart Vaughan and Jean-Christophe Barc, directed by Jacques Décombe, with Alexandre Brasseur, Delphine Depardieu, 17 September
- 2012: Plein la Vue by Jean Franco and Guillaume Mélanie, directed by Jean-Luc Moreau, 1 March
- 2012: Occupe-toi d'Amélie! by Georges Feydeau new version and directed by Pierre Laville, with Hélène de Fougerolles, Bruno Putzulu, Jacques Balutin, 20 September
- 2013: Coup de sangria by Eric Chappell adaptation Stewart Vaughan and Jean-Christophe Barc, directed by Jean-Luc Moreau, with Frédéric van den Driessche, Jean-Luc Porraz, 12 September
- 2014: Hollywood, by Ron Hutchinson, adaptation Martine Dolleans, directed by Daniel Colas, with Thierry Frémont, Pierre Cassignard, Emmanuel Patron and Françoise Pinkwasser, 24 January.

=== Management by Richard Caillat and Stéphane Hillel ===
- 2015: Représailles by Éric Assous, directed by Anne Bourgeois, with Marie-Anne Chazel and Michel Sardou, 22 September
- 2015: Il était une fois... les histoires préférées des enfants, directed by Agnès Boury, with voices of Jenifer and Jean-Pierre Marielle, 20 November

== See also ==
- List of theatres and entertainment venues in Paris
