= Dominique Lavanant =

French actress

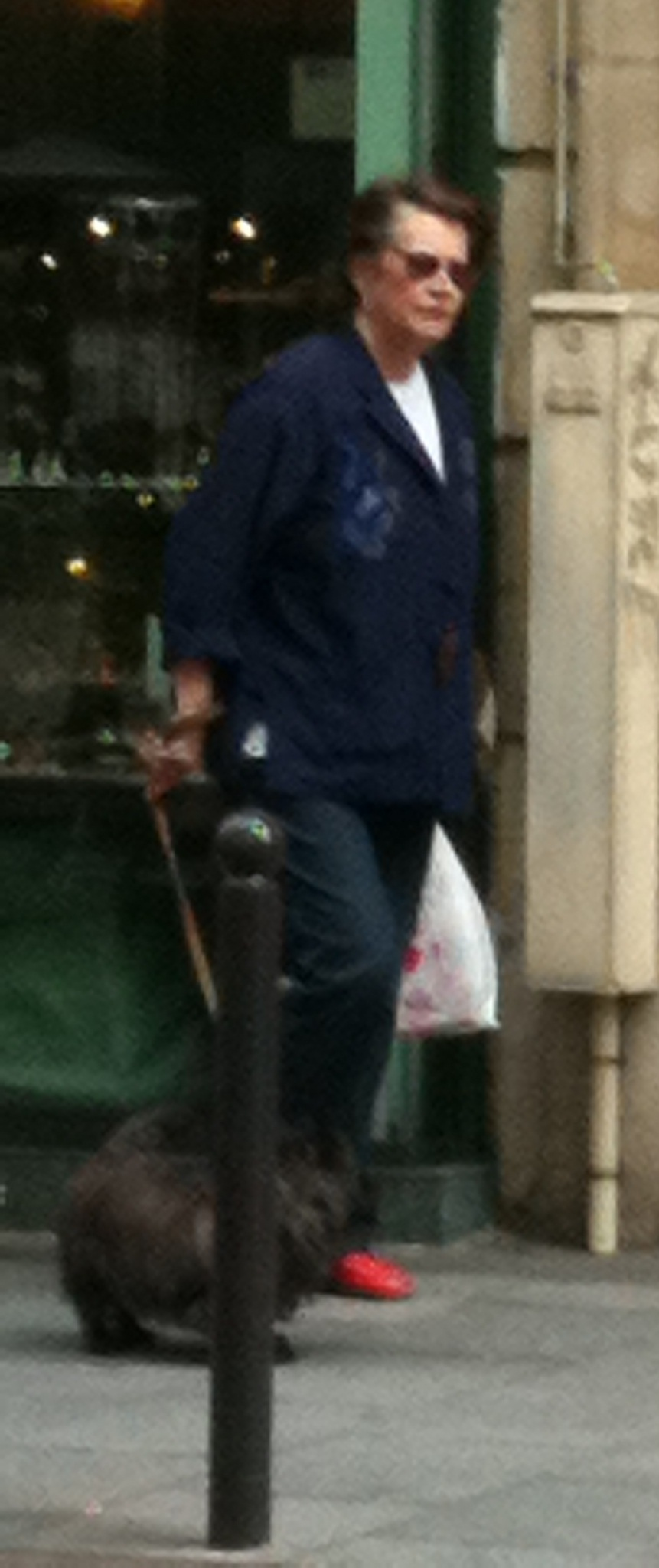
- Lavanant in 2012
- Born: 24 May 1944 (age 81); Morlaix, Finistère, France
- Occupation: Actress
- Years active: 1974–present

Dominique Lavanant (born 24 May 1944) is a French film and theatrical actress. She is known for her comedy skills especially with posh and distinguished characters like Rosalind Russell's; characters often defined by the adjective BCBG, bon chic bon genre, and which refers to a particular stereotype of the French upper middle class – to be conservative in both outlook and dress.

== Career ==
Lavanant became known in the mid-1970s while filming Les bronzés with the acting troupe Le Splendid – (Gérard Jugnot, Josiane Balasko, Michel Blanc, Thierry Lhermitte, Christian Clavier, Marie-Anne Chazel).

She starred in the long-lasting French TV series Sœur Thérèse.com (2002–2011) playing a former policer who became a nun but is still a committed detective.

== Filmography ==
Year	Title	Role	Director	Notes
1974	Parade		Jacques Tati	TV Movie
1975	La coupe à dix francs		Philippe Condroyer	
1975	Les Galettes de Pont-Aven	Marie Pape	Joël Séria	
1976	Calmos	The short-sighted woman	Bertrand Blier	
1976	Silence... on tourne	The porn actress	Roger Coggio	
1976	Marie-poupée	Aunt Alice	Joël Séria (2)	
1977	Peppermint Soda	The maths professor	Diane Kurys	
1977	Comme la lune	Yvette	Joël Séria (3)	
1977	Vous n'aurez pas l'Alsace et la Lorraine	The Queen Madeleine	Coluche	
1977	Solveig et le violon turc		Jean-Jacques Grand-Jouan	
1978	Les Bronzés	Christiane	Patrice Leconte	
1978	Butterfly on the Shoulder	The Young Woman	Jacques Deray	
1978	Vas-y maman	The neighbor	Nicole de Buron	
1978	Dégustation maison		Sophie Tatischeff	Short
1978	Le petit théâtre d'Antenne 2		Pierre Cavassilas	TV Series (1 Episode)
1979	Cause toujours... tu m'intéresses!	Michèle	Édouard Molinaro	
1979	Les Bronzés font du ski	Christiane	Patrice Leconte (2)	
1979	La Gueule de l'autre	The house maid	Pierre Tchernia	
1979	A Little Romance	Mme. Cormier	George Roy Hill	
1979	Courage – Let's Run	Mathilda	Yves Robert	Nominated – César Award for Best Supporting Actress
1980	The Horse of Pride	Marie-Jeanne	Claude Chabrol	
1980	The Umbrella Coup	Mireille	Gérard Oury	
1980	Inspector Blunder	Marie-Anne Prossant	Claude Zidi	
1980	La Boum	Vanessa	Claude Pinoteau	
1981	Les hommes préfèrent les grosses	Arlette	Jean-Marie Poiré	
1981	Hotel America	Jacqueline	André Téchiné	
1981	Est-ce bien raisonnable?	Mme Lavanant	Georges Lautner	
1981	Pourquoi pas nous?	Jacqueline Puiset	Michel Berny	
1982	Y a-t-il un Français dans la salle ?	Ginette Alcazar	Jean-Pierre Mocky	
1982	Le mystère du gala maudit ...		Bernard Lion	TV Movie
1983	Entre Nous	The head waitress	Diane Kurys (2)	
1983	Papy fait de la résistance	Bernadette Bourdelle	Jean-Marie Poiré (2)	
1983	Debout les crabes, la mer monte!	Mireille	Jean-Jacques Grand-Jouan (2)	
1983	Attention une femme peut en cacher une autre!	Solange	Georges Lautner (2)	
1984	Le léopard	Pauline Fitzgerald	Jean-Claude Sussfeld	
1984	La smala	Pierrot / Rita	Jean-Loup Hubert	
1984	Paroles et Musique	Florence	Élie Chouraqui	
1985	Les Nanas	Evelyne	Annick Lanoë	
1985	Sac de noeuds	The nurse	Josiane Balasko	
1985	Rendez-vous	Gertrude	André Téchiné (2)	
1985	Three Men and a Cradle	Madame Rapons	Coline Serreau	Nominated – César Award for Best Supporting Actress
1985	Billy Ze Kick	Madame Achere	Gérard Mordillat	
1985	Le mariage du siècle	Adrienne	Philippe Galland	
1986	Kamikaze	Laure	Didier Grousset	
1986	Le débutant	Marguerite Balicourt	Daniel Janneau & Francis Perrin	
1986	Je hais les acteurs	Miss Davis	Gérard Krawczyk	
1986	Mort un dimanche de pluie	Hazel Bronsky	Joël Santoni	
1986	The Joint Brothers	A Cop	Hervé Palud	
1987	Agent trouble	Catherine "Karen" Dariller	Jean-Pierre Mocky (2)	César Award for Best Supporting Actress
1987	Keep Your Right Up	The Admiral's wife	Jean-Luc Godard	
1987	L'oeil au beur(re) noir	Simone Perron	Serge Meynard	
1988	Les années sandwiches	The bourgeois	Pierre Boutron	
1988	Quelques jours avec moi	Madame Fonfrin	Claude Sautet	Nominated – César Award for Best Supporting Actress
1988	Cinéma	Clara Moranti	Philippe Lefebvre	TV Mini-Series
1988	L'excès contraire	Hanae	Yves-André Hubert	TV Movie
1989	Palace	'Tourism and Culture'	Jean-Michel Ribes	TV Series (1 Episode)
1989–1996	Imogène	Imogène Le Dantec	Paul Vecchiali, ...	TV Series (10 Episodes)
1990	Un jeu d'enfant	Léonie	Pascal Kané	
1990	La fracture du myocarde	Claire's mother	Jacques Fansten	
1991	Les secrets professionnels du Dr Apfelglück	Jacqueline Vidart	Alessandro Capone, Thierry Lhermitte, ...	
1992	Ville à vendre	Eva Montier	Jean-Pierre Mocky (3)	
1992	My Wife's Girlfriends	Marguerite	Didier Van Cauwelaert	
1993	Shadow of a Doubt	Teacher	Aline Issermann	
1993	Pepita	Plume	Dominique Baron	TV Movie
1993	La voisine du dessus		André Gall	Short
1994	Grosse Fatigue	Dominique Lavanant	Michel Blanc	
1994	The Monster	Jolanda Taccone	Roberto Benigni	
1994	Ma soeur est un chic type	Claude Charmières	Mathias Ledoux (2)	TV Movie
1996	Désiré	Henriette	Bernard Murat	
2001	A Crime in Paradise	Madame Goutilleux	Jean Becker	
2002–2011	Sœur Thérèse.com	Sister Thérèse	Several	TV Series (21 Episodes)
2004	Madame Édouard	Rose	Nadine Monfils	
2006	Les Bronzés 3: Amis pour la vie	Christiane	Patrice Leconte (3)	
2008	Agathe Cléry	Mimie Cléry	Étienne Chatiliez	
2009	Myster Mocky présente	Herself	Jean-Pierre Mocky (4)	TV Series Short (1 Episode)
2010	Pièce montée	Vincent's mother	Denys Granier-Deferre	
2012	Paulette	Lucienne	Jérôme Enrico	
2012	La clinique de l'amour!	Mademoiselle Phillips	Artus de Penguern & Gábor Rassov	
2013	Le renard jaune	Valérie	Jean-Pierre Mocky (5)	
2013	Myster Mocky présente	Herself	Jean-Pierre Mocky (6)	TV Series Short (1 Episode)
2013	À votre bon coeur Mesdames	Yvette	Jean-Pierre Mocky (7)	
2014	Nicholas on Holiday	Nicolas's grandmother	Laurent Tirard	
