= George Aguilar =

American actor

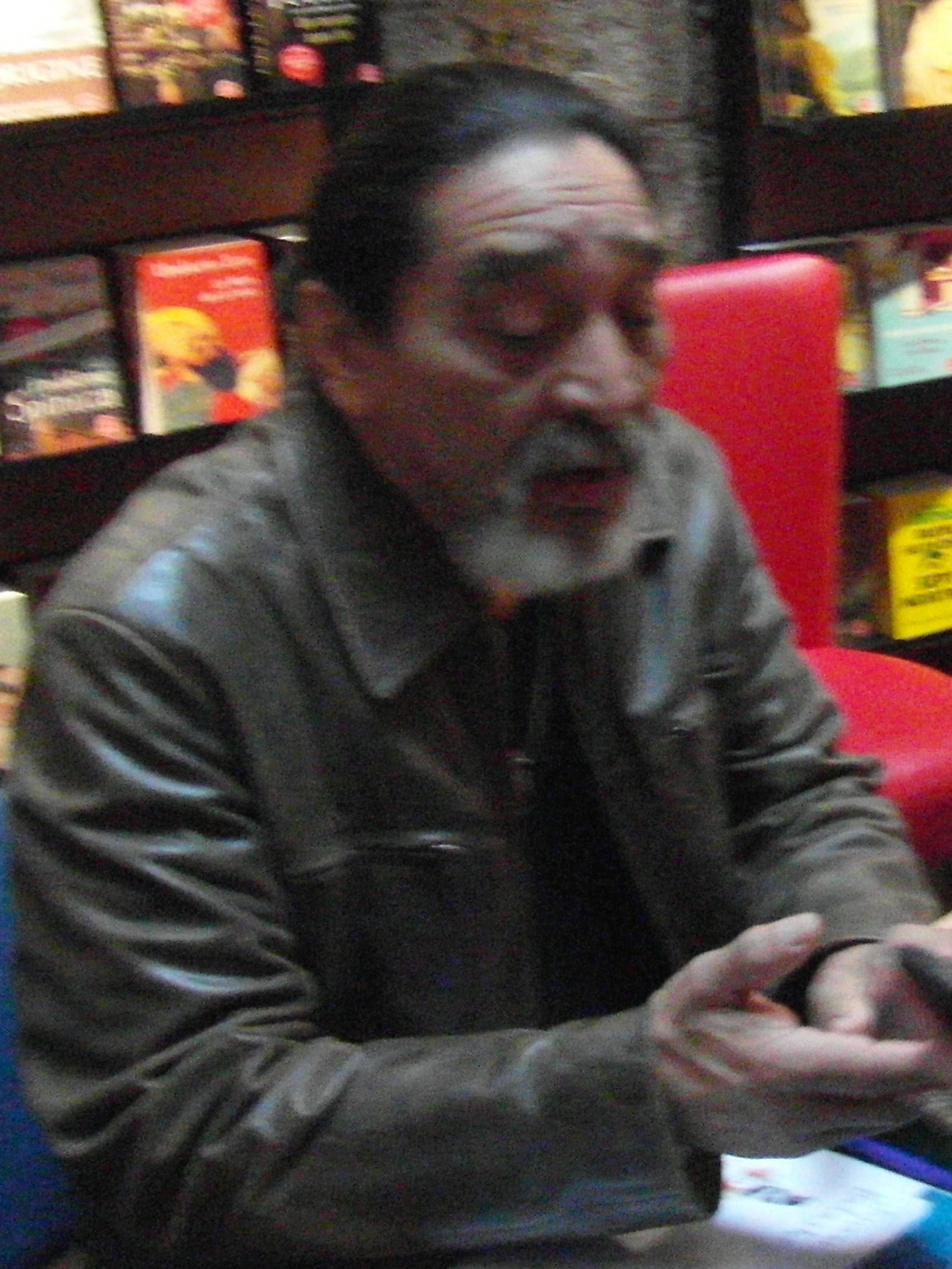
- George Aguilar in 2019.
- Born: February 25, 1955 (age 71); Flint, Michigan, U.S.
- Citizenship: United States
- Occupation: Actor
- Years active: 1972–present
- Spouse: Josiane Balasko (2003–present)
- Children: 6

George Aguilar is an American actor. He is best known for his roles as Cahuenga in Bagdad Café, Johnny Sassamon in The Scarlet Letter, Grandfather Stone in Dreamkeeper, Big Foot in Into the West, and the Kaw Chief in Neverland.

== Career ==
Aguilar is probably best known for his work on Bagdad Cafe (1987), The Scarlet Letter (1995) and the miniseries Neverland (2011).

== Personal life ==
Aguilar has been married to French actress Josiane Balasko since 2003. They reside in the Paris area.

A son, also named George Aguilar, was a car mechanic and aspiring actor who with his father appeared in The Scarlet Letter (1995) and Into The West (2005); he died in 2008 at age 28.

== Filmography ==
=== Feature film appearances ===
Year	Title	Role	Director	Notes
1972	Ulzana's Raid	Indian Brave	Robert Aldrich	
1974	The Trial of Billy Jack	Elk's Shadow	Tom Laughlin	
1987	Bagdad Café	Cahuenga	Percy Adlon	
1991	Lunatics: A Love Story	Comet	Josh Becker	
1995	The Scarlet Letter	Johnny Sassamon	Roland Joffé	
1998	Almost Heroes	Chief Two Roads	Christopher Guest	
1998	Phoenix	Mr. Fat	Danny Cannon	
1999	Le fils du Français	Indian Chief	Gérard Lauzier	
2003	The Mystery of the Yellow Room	Littlefoot / The gamekeeper	Bruno Podalydès	
2004	Our Music	Indian	Jean-Luc Godard	
2004	Casablanca Driver	Willy Stevens	Maurice Barthélemy	
2005	La vie est à nous !	Sky	Gérard Krawczyk	
2005	L'Ex-femme de ma vie	Forcené M. Alvarez	Josiane Balasko	
2006	Les Bronzés 3: Amis pour la vie	The nurse spa	Patrice Leconte	
2007	Big City	Indian Wizard	Djamel Bensalah	
2008	Cliente	Jim	Josiane Balasko (2)	
2009	Park Benches	Gary	Bruno Podalydès (2)	
2009	Orpailleur	Joseph	Marc Barrat	
2010	The Undeaducated	George	Cynthia Serrano	Short
2012	Au galop	The taxi driver	Louis-Do de Lencquesaing	
2012	Dark Blood	Indian	George Sluizer	
2013	Demi-soeur	Silver	Josiane Balasko (3)	

=== Television appearances ===
Year	Title	Role	Director	Notes
1977	The Life and Times of Grizzly Adams		Jack B. Hively	TV series (1 episode)
1977	ABC Weekend Special	Yellow Nose	John Llewellyn Moxey	TV series (1 episode)
1979	Little House on the Prairie	Brave	Michael Landon	TV series (1 episode)
1984	The Mystic Warrior	Kungi Yuha Leader	Richard T. Heffron	TV movie
1985	Code of Vengeance	Plainclothes Cop	Rick Rosenthal	TV movie
1991	Lightning Field	Guard	Michael Switzer	TV movie
1992	Mann & Machine	Irontree	James A. Contner	TV series (1 episode)
1993	Shadowhunter	Daniel Nez	J. S. Cardone	TV movie
1994	Star Trek: The Next Generation	Wakasa	Corey Allen	TV series (1 episode)
1995	Siringo	Yellow Hawk	Kevin G. Cremin	TV movie
2003	Dreamkeeper	Grandfather Stone	Steve Barron	TV movie
2005	Into the West	Spotted Elk	Jeremy Podeswa	TV mini-series
2006	David Nolande	Jo	Nicolas Cuche	TV series (1 episode)
2009	Services sacrés	Indian	Vincenzo Marano	TV series (1 episode)
2010	Big Jim	Peter	Christian Merret-Palmair	TV movie
2011	Neverland	Kaw Chief	Nick Willing	TV mini-series
2013	Phil Spector	Mr. Spector's driver	David Mamet	TV movie
