= Bruno Moynot =

French actor and theatre director (born 1950)

- Born: 20 December 1950 (age 75); Bois-Colombes, Hauts-de-Seine, France
- Occupations: Actor, comedian, writer
- Years active: 1976–present
- Partner: Josiane Balasko (1974–1981)

Bruno Moynot (French: [bʁyno mwanɔ]; born 20 December 1950, in Bois-Colombes, Hauts-de-Seine, France) is a French actor and theatre director.

Part of the French comedy group Le Splendid, he is also known for his roles in Patrice Leconte's Les Bronzés and its sequels, and as Zedko Preskovitch in Le Père Noël est une ordure.

With Christian Spillemaecker, he is the owner of Le Splendid and the Théâtre de la Renaissance.

== Filmography ==
Year	Title	Role	Director	Notes
1976	L'affiche rouge	Jonas Geduldig	Frank Cassenti	
1977	Vous n'aurez pas l'Alsace et la Lorraine		Coluche	
1977	Une fille unique	Raymond	Philippe Nahoun	
1978	The Song of Roland	Pair Charlemagne / A pilgrim / A monk	Frank Cassenti (2)	
1978	La tortue sur le dos		Luc Béraud	
1978	Les Bronzés	Gilbert Sellman	Patrice Leconte	Also writer
1979	Heroes Are Not Wet Behind the Ears	The car renter	Charles Nemes	
1979	Les Bronzés font du ski	Gilbert Sellman	Patrice Leconte (2)	Also writer
1981	Viens chez moi, j'habite chez une copine	The owner	Patrice Leconte (3)	
1981	Les Babas Cool	Doctor Jean Morin	François Leterrier	
1982	Le Père Noël est une ordure	Zadko Preskovic	Jean-Marie Poiré	Also writer
1982	Le quart d'heure américain	The director	Philippe Galland	
1983	Papy fait de la résistance	Flandu	Jean-Marie Poiré (2)	
1985	Le Père Noël est une ordure	Zadko Preskovic	Philippe Galland (2)	TV movie Also writer
1985	Sac de noeuds	A cop	Josiane Balasko	
1986	Prunelle Blues	The cop on duty	Jacques Otmezguine	
1986	Nuit d'ivresse	The cameraman	Bernard Nauer	
1987	Les Keufs		Josiane Balasko (2)	
1989	Après la guerre		Jean-Loup Hubert	
1991	Les secrets professionnels du Dr Apfelglück	The consumer's bistro	Alessandro Capone, Thierry Lhermitte & ...	
1991	My Life Is Hell	The realtor	Josiane Balasko (3)	
1994	Grosse fatigue	The driver	Michel Blanc	
2003	The Car Keys	Zadko Preskovic	Laurent Baffie	
2006	Les Bronzés 3: Amis pour la vie	Jambier	Patrice Leconte (4)	
2010	Nothing to Declare	The realtor	Dany Boon	
2011	Au bistro du coin	Bouzigues	Charles Nemes (2)	
