= Farid Chopel =

French actor, comedian and singer

- Born: Farid Rabia; 4 December 1952; Paris, France
- Died: 20 April 2008 (aged 55); Paris, France
- Occupations: Actor; Singer

Farid Chopel (4 December 1952 – 20 April 2008) was a French actor, comedian and singer. He was of Algerian descent.

== Filmography ==
- 1983 – Les Princes (Tony Gatlif)
- 1983 – La Femme de mon pote (Bertrand Blier)
- 1984 – L'Addition (Denis Amar)
- 1984 – Les Fauves (Jean-Louis Daniel)
- 1984 – La vengeance du serpent à plumes (Gérard Oury)
- 1985 – Sac de nœuds (Josiane Balasko)
- 1985 – Poésie en images (Abel Bennour)
- 1986 – Suivez mon regard (Jean Curtelin)
- 1986 – Le Torero hallucinogène (Stéphane Clavier)
- 1987 – Iréna et les ombres (Alain Robak)
- 1987 – Jane B. par Agnès V. (Agnès Varda)
- 1989 – Le Banquet (Marco Ferreri) (TV)
- 1991 – La Chair (La carne) (Marco Ferreri)
- 1992 – Un vampire au paradis (Abdel Krim Bahloul)
- 1996 – Mo' (Yves-Noël François)
- 1996 – Rainbow pour Raimbaud (Jean Teulé)
- 2006 – A City Is Beautiful at Night (Richard Bohringer)
- 2007 – C'est Gradiva qui vous appelle (Alain Robbe-Grillet)
- 2007 – Un si beau voyage (Khaled Ghorbal)

== Discography ==
- 1982 – Go Anywhere, single
- 1982 – Ô Animaux, single et maxi single
