= Nadia Barentin =

French actress (1936–2011)

- Born: 17 October 1936; Paris, France
- Died: 22 March 2011 (aged 74); Paris, France
- Occupation: Actress
- Years active: 1948–2011

Nadia Barentin (17 October 1936 – 22 March 2011) was a French actress, known for her theatre and film roles, including Les Blessures assassines in 2000.

She was nominated for the Molière Award for Best Supporting Actress for Monsieur Klebs et Rosalie in 1993.

== Selected filmography ==
- 1979 : Heroes Are Not Wet Behind the Ears, directed by Charles Nemes
- 1994 : Coming to Terms with the Dead, directed by Pascale Ferran
- 1998 : Un grand cri d'amour, directed by Josiane Balasko

== Death ==
Barentin died on 22 March 2011, aged 74, from undisclosed causes.
