= My Best Pals =

- Theatrical release poster
- Directed by: Jean-Marie Poiré
- Written by: Jean-Marie Poiré; Christian Clavier
- Produced by: Christian Fechner
- Starring: Gérard Lanvin; Christian Clavier; Jean-Pierre Bacri
- Cinematography: Claude Agostini
- Edited by: Michèle David; Catherine Kelber; Adeline Yoyotte
- Music by: Michel Goglat
- Production company: Gaumont
- Distributed by: Gaumont Distribution
- Release date: 1 March 1989
- Running time: 110 minutes
- Country: France
- Language: French
- Box office: $2.7 million

My Best Pals (French: Mes meilleurs copains) is a 1989 French comedy film directed by Jean-Marie Poiré.

== Cast ==
- Gérard Lanvin - Richard Chappoteaux
- Christian Clavier - Jean-Michel Thuillier
- Jean-Pierre Bacri - Eric Guidolini (Guido)
- Philippe Khorsand - Antoine Jobert
- Louise Portal - Bernadette Legranbois
- Jean-Pierre Darroussin - Daniel Pécoud (Dany)
- Marie-Anne Chazel - Anne
- Élisabeth Margoni - Monique
