= Marie-Anne Chazel =

French actress, screenwriter and director

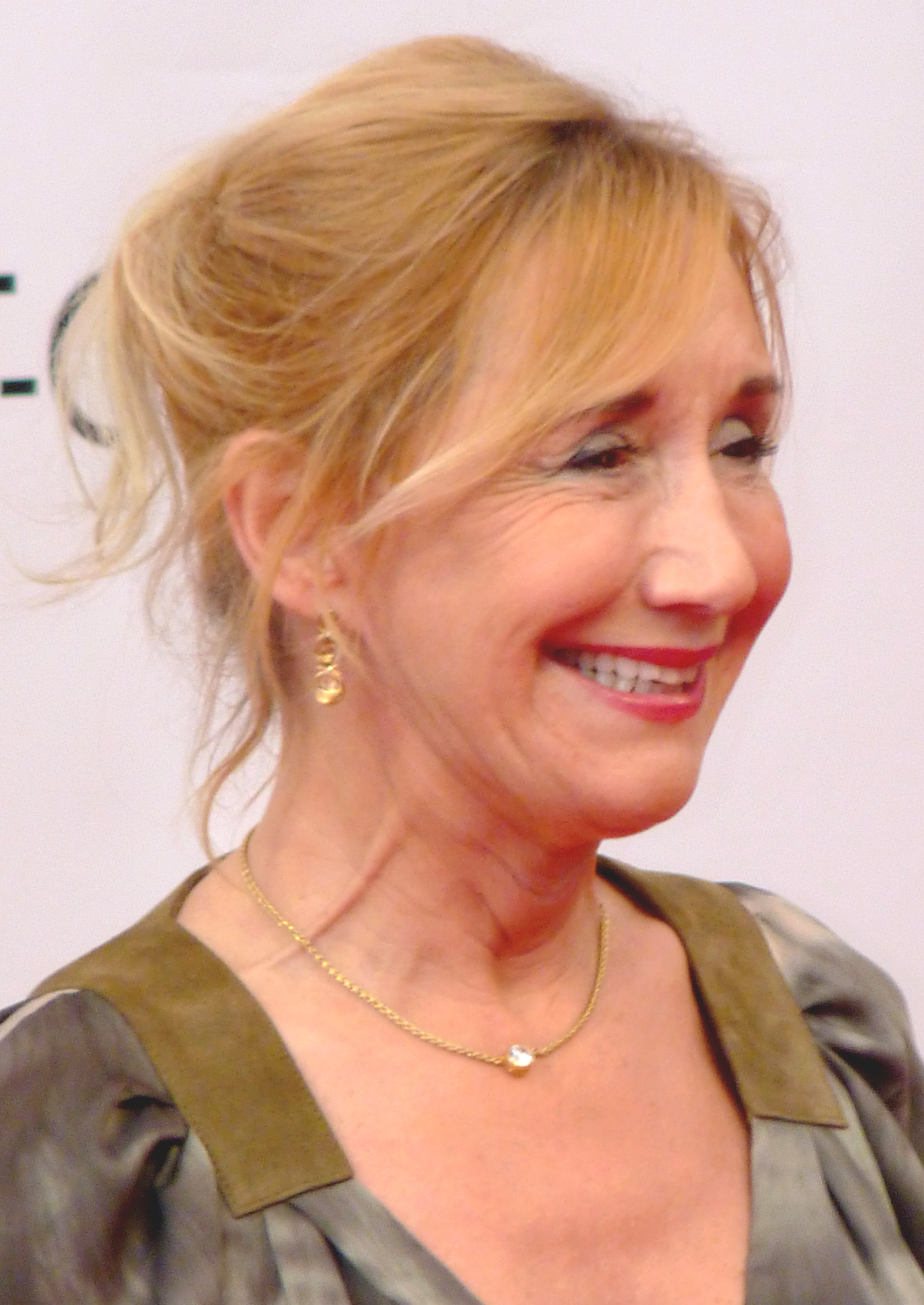
- Chazel in 2012
- Born: Marie-Anne France Jacqueline Chazel; 19 September 1951 (age 75); Gap, Hautes-Alpes, France
- Spouse: Christian Clavier (m. 1976–2001)
- Children: 1

Marie-Anne France Jacqueline Chazel (French: [maʁi an ʃazɛl]; born 19 September 1951) is a French actress, screenwriter and director, who has been active in both film and television since 1974.

== Biography ==
Chazel was born to actress Louba Guertchikoff (birth name Louba Louise Pinon; 1919–1999) in Gap, Hautes-Alpes.

From 1967, Chazel studied at Pasteur College, alongside Michel Blanc, Gerard Jugnot, Thierry Lhermitte and Christian Clavier. After the achievement of her baccalaureate and two years of studies of political sciences, she and her college comrades formed a theatrical troop in 1974 named Le Splendid, joined by Josiane Balasko.

Chazel achieved popularity as Gigi in Les Bronzés (1978) directed by Patrice Leconte. She is best known for her role as Ginette in Les Visiteurs (1993).

From 1976 to 2001, Chazel was married to actor Christian Clavier. They have one child, a daughter Margot Clavier (b. 1983).

== Filmography ==
Year	Title	Role	Director	Notes
1974	La face Nord	Marie	Charles Nemes	Short
1975	Le bol d'air	Marie-Anne	Charles Nemes (2)	Short
1976	The Wing or the Thigh	Gérard's friend	Claude Zidi	
1976	On aura tout vu	Marie-Anne	Georges Lautner	
1976	Cours après moi ... que je t'attrape	Paul's secretary	Robert Pouret	
1977	Vous n'aurez pas l'Alsace et la Lorraine	Queen of Flanders	Coluche	
1977	Le point de mire	The postmistress	Jean-Claude Tramont	
1978	Les Bronzés	Gigi	Patrice Leconte	
1978	Pauline et l'ordinateur		Francis Fehr	
1978	La tortue sur le dos		Luc Béraud	
1978	Les héritiers	Charlotte	Pierre Lary	TV series (1 episode)
1979	French Postcards	Cécile	Willard Huyck	
1979	Les Bronzés font du ski	Gigi	Patrice Leconte (2)	
1979	Heroes Are Not Wet Behind the Ears	The 2CV Woman	Charles Nemes (3)	
1979	Le coup de sirocco	General's servant	Alexandre Arcady	
1979	Caméra une première	Claire	Michel Léviant	TV series (1 episode)
1981	Viens chez moi, j'habite chez une copine	Catherine	Patrice Leconte (3)	
1981	Les Babas Cool	Aline	François Leterrier	
1981	On n'est pas des anges... elles non plus	Clothilde Le Vagec	Michel Lang	
1981	Fais gaffe à la gaffe!	Pénélope	Paul Boujenah	
1981	L'année prochaine... si tout va bien	Huguette	Jean-Loup Hubert	
1981	Caméra une première	Mélusine	Jean-Pierre Prévost	TV series (1 episode)
1982	Le Père Noël est une ordure	Zézette	Jean-Marie Poiré	
1983	Le petit théâtre d'Antenne 2		Jean-Michel Ribes	TV series (1 episode)
1985	Tranches de vie	Béatrice	François Leterrier (2)	
1985	L'amour en douce	Josyane	Édouard Molinaro	
1985	Le père Noël est une ordure	Zézette	Philippe Galland	TV movie
1986	La gitane	Mlle Caprot	Philippe de Broca	
1987	Cross	Catherine Crosky	Philippe Setbon	
1987	La vie dissolue de Gérard Floque	Martine Vasseur	Georges Lautner (2)	
1988	Palace	Solange	Jean-Michel Ribes (2)	TV series (1 episode)
1989	Asterix and the Big Fight	Bonnemine	Philippe Grimond	
1989	Mes meilleurs copains	Anne	Jean-Marie Poiré (2)	
1989	Double mixte	Marylou	Georges Folgoas	TV movie
1989	Fantômes sur l'oreiller	Martine	Pierre Mondy	TV movie
1989	Si Guitry m'était conté	Valentine	Yves-André Hubert	TV series (3 episodes)
1991	Les gens ne sont pas forcément ignobles	Sandra	Bernard Murat	TV movie
1992	Vacances au purgatoire	Lucie Bouchard	Marc Simenon	TV movie
1993	Les Visiteurs	Ginette Sarcley	Jean-Marie Poiré (3)	
1994	La Vengeance d'une blonde	Corine Bréha	Jeannot Szwarc	
1994	Grosse fatigue	Herself	Michel Blanc	
1997	Les Soeurs Soleil	Bénédicte d'Hachicourt	Jeannot Szwarc (2)	
1998	The Visitors II: The Corridors of Time	Ginette Sarcley	Jean-Marie Poiré (4)	
2001	L'emmerdeuse	Colette Lafarge	Michaël Perrotta	TV series
2002	Patron sur mesure	Betty Delauney	Stéphane Clavier	TV movie
2003	L'emmerdeuse: Les caprices de l'amour	Colette Lafarge	Michaël Perrotta (2)	TV movie
2004	Au secours, j'ai 30 ans!	Kathy's mother	Marie-Anne Chazel	
2006	Les Bronzés 3: Amis pour la vie	Gigi	Patrice Leconte (4)	
2008	Le malade imaginaire	Toinette	Christian de Chalonge	TV movie
2008	Chez Maupassant	Madame Husson	Denis Malleval	TV series (1 episode)
2009	Au siècle de Maupassant	Léonida Champbourcy	Philippe Monnier	TV series (1 episode)
2010	Les méchantes	The Countess	Philippe Monnier (2)	TV movie
2010-11	Les Edelweiss	Françoise	Philippe Proteau & Stéphane Kappes	TV series (3 episodes)
2011	The Well-Digger's Daughter	Nathalie	Daniel Auteuil	
2011	Brassens, la mauvaise réputation	Jeanne Le Bonniec	Gérard Marx	TV movie
2011	Chez Maupassant	Madame Caravan	Denis Malleval (2)	TV series (1 episode)
2012	Le bonheur des Dupré	Nat	Bruno Chiche	TV movie
2013	Marius	Honorine	Daniel Auteuil (2)	
2013	Fanny	Honorine	Daniel Auteuil (3)	
2013	Le Boeuf clandestin	Madame Berthaud	Gérard Jourd'hui	TV movie
2013	Scènes de ménage	Marion's mother	Francis Duquet	TV series (1 episode)
2014	Camellias	Odette	Julien Landais	Short
2015	Presque comme les autres	Liliane	Renaud Bertrand	TV movie
2015	Le mystère du lac	Marianne Stocker	Jérôme Cornuau	TV mini-series
2016	Les Visiteurs: La Révolution	Prune	Jean-Marie Poiré (5)	
2016	Ma famille t'adore déjà	Marie-Laure	Jérôme Commandeur & Alan Corno	
2017	Sous le même toit		Dominique Farrugia	
2018	Germanized	Martine	Denis Dercourt	TV series
2020	30 Jours max	Rayane's grandmother	Tarek Boudali	
2021	À tes côtés	Chantal	Gilles Paquet-Brenner	TV movie
2021	Noël à tous les étages	Nicoletta	Gilles Paquet-Brenner	
2021–2022	Le Grand Restaurant			TV series (2 episodes)
2023	3 Jours max	Rayane's grandmother	Tarek Boudali	
2024	This Is the Goat!	The widow Piquet	Fred Cavayé	

== Theater ==
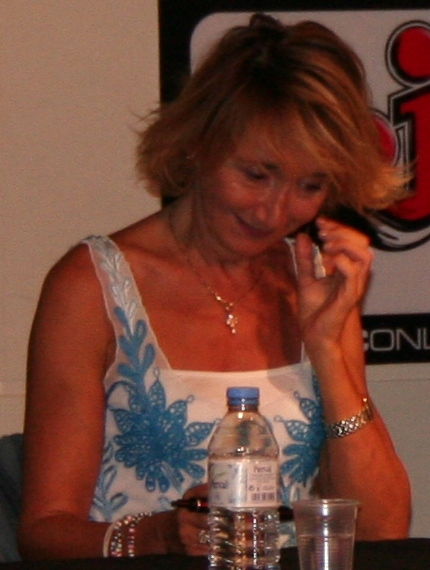
Marie-Anne Chazel in 2006

Year	Title	Author	Director	Notes
1975	Ma tête est malade	Le Splendid	Le Splendid	
1976	Le Pot de terre contre le pot de vin	Le Splendid	Le Splendid (2)	
1977	Amour, coquillages et crustacés	Le Splendid	Le Splendid (3)	
1979	Santa Claus Is a Stinker	Le Splendid	Le Splendid (4)	
1980	Gramps Is in the Resistance	Christian Clavier & Martin Lamotte	Le Splendid (5)	
1985	Un drôle de cadeau	Jean Bouchaud	Jean Bouchaud	
1986	Double mixte	Ray Cooney	Pierre Mondy	
1989	Pièce détachée	Alan Ayckbourn	Bernard Murat	
1991	La Dame de chez Maxim	Georges Feydeau	Bernard Murat (2)	Nominated – Molière Award for Best Actress
1994	The Odd Couple	Neil Simon	Bernard Murat (3)	
1999	Comédie privée	Neil Simon	Adrian Brine	
2002	Same Time, Next Year	Bernard Slade	Pierre Mondy (2)	
2005	Loot	Joe Orton	Marion Bierry	
2008	Tailleur pour dames	Georges Feydeau	Bernard Murat (4)	
2009	Goodbye Charlie	George Axelrod	Didier Caron	
2011	Love, Loss, and What I Wore	Nora & Delia Ephron	Danièle Thompson	
2012–13	Le Bonheur	Éric Assous	Jean-Luc Moreau	
2015	Un temps de chien	Brigitte Buc	Jean Bouchaud (2)	
2015	Représailles	Éric Assous	Anne Bourgeois	
