= Men Prefer Fat Girls =

- Theatrical release poster
- Directed by: Jean-Marie Poiré
- Written by: Josiane Balasko
- Produced by: Hubert Niogret
- Starring: Josiane Balasko; Daniel Auteuil
- Cinematography: Bernard Lutic
- Edited by: Noëlle Boisson
- Music by: Catherine Lara
- Distributed by: Compagnie Commerciale Française Cinématographique (CCFC); Groupement des Editeurs de Films (GEF)
- Release date: 19 August 1981
- Running time: 96 minutes
- Language: French
- Box office: $12.6 million

Men Prefer Fat Girls (or Les hommes préfèrent les grosses) is a French comedy film directed by Jean-Marie Poiré. It was released in 1981, adapted from a script by Josiane Balasko.

== Plot ==
Lydie has just paid a considerable rent deposit for a new flat when her boyfriend breaks up with her and now she is alone in a flat she cannot afford. She starts looking for a flatmate and finally chooses Eva, a model. Eventually Lydie gets to know Eva's friends and that changes her life.

== Cast ==
- Josiane Balasko: Lydie Langlois
- Daniel Auteuil: Jean-Yves
- Dominique Lavanant: Arlette
- Luis Rego: Gérard Langlois
- Ariane Lartéguy: Éva
- Thierry Lhermitte: Hervé
- François Berléand: Julien
- Xavier Saint-Macary: Ronald
- François-Eric Gendron: Adrien
- Martin Lamotte: Paul Berthellot
- Isabelle Mergault: Paul's lover
- Chantal Neuwirth: Postulant for Lydia apartment
