= All Mixed Up (film) =

1985 film

- Theatrical release poster
- Directed by: Josiane Balasko
- Written by: Josiane Balasko; Jacques Audiard
- Produced by: Marie-Laure Reyre
- Starring: Isabelle Huppert; Josiane Balasko
- Cinematography: François Catonné
- Edited by: Catherine Kelber
- Music by: Michel Goglat; Gérard Blanchard
- Production company: Oliane Productions
- Distributed by: Warner Bros. (through Warner-Columbia Film)
- Release date: 20 March 1985
- Running time: 90 minutes
- Country: France
- Language: French
- Box office: $4.7 million

All Mixed Up (French: Sac de noeuds) is a 1985 French comedy film directed by Josiane Balasko and starring Balasko and Isabelle Huppert.

== Plot ==
Rose-Marie, a would-be vamp living in a disadvantaged area, gets beaten up by her policeman husband. She takes refuge in a nearby apartment, disturbing her neighbor Anita, a depressed bag lady who was about to commit suicide. The two women knock out Rose-Marie's husband. Believing him dead, they escape and embark on an helter-skelter trip where they are soon joined by Rico, a petty criminal on the run.

== Cast ==
- Isabelle Huppert as Rose-Marie Martin
- Josiane Balasko as Anita
- Farid Chopel as Rico Da Silva
- Jean Carmet as Mr. Buzinski
- Coluche as Coyotte
- Dominique Lavanant as Dr. Belin's nurse
- Daniel Russo as André Martin
- Howard Vernon as Dr. Belin
- Bruno Moynot as The policeman
