= Signes extérieurs de richesse =

- Directed by: Jacques Monnet
- Written by: Jacques Monnet; Alain Godard
- Produced by: Christian Ferlet
- Starring: Josiane Balasko; Claude Brasseur
- Cinematography: Philippe Welt
- Edited by: Pierre Gillette
- Music by: Eric Bouad; Johnny Hallyday; Pierre Billon (composer)
- Distributed by: Groupement des Editeurs de Films (GEF); Compagnie Franco-Coloniale Cinématographique (CFCC)
- Release date: November 9, 1983
- Running time: 92 minutes
- Language: French
- Box office: $8.1 million

Signes extérieurs de richesse is a French comedy film directed by Jacques Monnet, written by Alain Godard and Jacques Monnet, and released in 1983.

== Plot ==
Jean-Jacques Lestrade is the owner of a renowned veterinary clinic in Paris who lives in a luxurious apartment. He is part of Parisian high society and lives a wealthy lifestyle surrounded by young women and money. He relies on his trusty accountant, Jérôme Bouvier, to manage his finances. All goes well until the day that Béatrice Flamand, a tax inspector, shows up at his clinic, at which point Lestrade is now in trouble.

== Cast ==
- Josiane Balasko: Béatrice Flamand
- Claude Brasseur: Jean-Jacques Lestrade
- Jean-Pierre Marielle: Jérôme Bouvier
- Roland Giraud: Gerard Picard
- Charlotte de Turckheim: Sylvie Picard
- Jean Reno: Marc Letellier
- Xavier Saint-Macary: Bianchi
- Pascale Ogier: Medical Assistant
