= Arlette (1997 film) =

- Theatrical release poster
- Directed by: Claude Zidi
- Written by: Claude Zidi; Josiane Balasko
- Produced by: Claude Berri; Pierre Grunstein
- Starring: Josiane Balasko; Christopher Lambert
- Cinematography: Jean-Jacques Tarbès
- Edited by: Nicole Saunier
- Music by: William Sheller
- Production companies: TF1 Films Production; Katharina; Renn Productions; MDG Productions; Les Films Flam
- Distributed by: AMLF
- Release date: 16 April 1997
- Running time: 100 minutes
- Country: France
- Language: French
- Budget: $11.7 million
- Box office: $5.4 million

Arlette is a 1997 French comedy-romance film directed by Claude Zidi.

== Plot ==
Arlette is a waitress at the "Centipede", a roadside restaurant in the middle of rural France. Loudmouth at the heart while rather romantic, she dreams of getting married but Victor, her boyfriend, a lorry driver, does not want to hear about it. One day, a charming prince, Frank, an American millionaire, arrives at the Centipede in a white limousine. Claiming to be depressed after his girlfriend's death, he seeks for Arlette's help and starts to seduce her with gifts and charming words. He eventually offers to take her to Las Vegas to marry her. But what is this seductive playboy truly after?

== Cast ==
- Josiane Balasko as Arlette Bathiat
- Christopher Lambert as Frank Martin
- Ennio Fantastichini as Angelo Mascarpone
- Stéphane Audran as Diane
- Jean-Marie Bigard as Victor
- Armelle as Lucie
- Martin Lamotte as The Chief
- Ronny Coutteure as Arlette's boss
- Jean-Pierre Castaldi as Lulu
- France Zobda as Samantha
- Jean-Claude Bouillon as The host
- Bouli Lanners as Emile
- Jed Allan as Wide
- Mathieu Demy as Julien
- Arno Chevrier as Mickey
- Tony Librizzi as Riri
- Pascal Benezech as Nanard
- Lionel Robert as Marcel
- Justin Hubbard as David Gafferson
- Isabelle Leprince as Brigitte
- David Fresco as Assler
- Renée Lee as Doris
- Junior Ray as Goliath
- Patrick Bordier as The monk
- Jacques Le Carpentier as The big guy

== Reception ==
Arlette opened in third place at the French box office with a gross of $1.7 million from 333 screens.
