= Three Men and a Cradle =

1985 French comedy film

Trois Hommes et un couffin
- Film poster
- Directed by: Coline Serreau
- Written by: Coline Serreau
- Produced by: Jean-Francois Lepetit
- Starring: Roland Giraud; Michel Boujenah; André Dussollier; Dominique Lavanant; Philippine Leroy-Beaulieu
- Cinematography: Jean-Jacques Bouhon; Jean-Yves Escoffier
- Edited by: Catherine Renault
- Music by: Franz Schubert
- Distributed by: Acteurs Auteurs Associés
- Release date: 1985
- Running time: 106 minutes
- Country: France
- Language: French

Three Men and a Cradle (French: Trois Hommes et un couffin) is a 1985 French comedy film by Coline Serreau. The film was remade in Hollywood as Three Men and a Baby in 1987, which subsequently inspired nine adaptations in seven languages.

== Plot ==
Jacques, Pierre, and Michel, three bachelors, share a spacious apartment in the heart of Paris.

One evening, during a party held in their apartment, Jacques, a professional steward, agrees to act as a courier for a package that a friend will deliver to him the next day. With little time to inform his friends, he departs for the Far East for several weeks. Upon the arrival of the "package", Jacques' roommates discover the baby seems to be Jacques' daughter, sent by her mother, Sylvia, citing her work commitments as preventing her from caring for the child. Reluctantly, the two friends, unaccustomed to the responsibilities of parenthood, find themselves overwhelmed by the demands of caring for an infant—feeding, changing diapers, and enduring sleepless nights.

One morning, two individuals come to claim the "package". Initially relieved, they hand over the cradle, only to realize moments later that the actual "package" awaited by the men was delivered by the caretaker days earlier, containing illicit drugs. Pierre and Michel narrowly rescue little Marie but must now swiftly return the drugs to menacing traffickers, all while under constant police surveillance. They eventually dispose of the incriminating cargo.

Upon Jacques' return from his travels, the baby is reunited with her mother, and to their own surprise, the absence of the child leaves a void in their lives. However, the child's mother eventually brings her back to the roommates, marking the beginning of a new chapter in the lives of the three men as they adapt to caring for the baby.

== Cast ==
- Roland Giraud as Pierre
- Michel Boujenah as Michel
- André Dussollier as Jacques
- Philippine Leroy-Beaulieu as Sylvia
- Dominique Lavanant as Madame Rapons
- Marthe Villalonga as Antoinette
- Annick Alane as The Pharmacist

== Reception ==
=== Critical response ===
Three Man and a Cradle has an approval rating of 72% on review aggregator website Rotten Tomatoes, based on 18 reviews, and an average rating of 6.2/10. Metacritic assigned the film a weighted average score of 44 out of 100, based on 14 critics, indicating "mixed or average reviews".

=== Accolades ===
| Award (Note: Awards, festivals and organizations are in alphabetical order.) | Date of ceremony (Note: Date is linked to the article about the awards held that year, wherever possible.) | Category | Recipient(s) | Result | Ref. |
|---|---|---|---|---|---|
| Academy Awards | 24 March 1986 | Best Foreign Language Film | Three Men and a Cradle – Coline Serreau | Nominated | |
| César Awards | 22 February 1986 | Best Film | Three Men and a Cradle – Coline Serreau | Won | |
| César Awards | 22 February 1986 | Best Director | Coline Serreau | Nominated | |
| César Awards | 22 February 1986 | Best Original Screenplay or Adaptation | Coline Serreau | Won | |
| César Awards | 22 February 1986 | Best Supporting Actor | Michel Boujenah | Won | |
| César Awards | 22 February 1986 | Best Supporting Actress | Dominique Lavanant | Nominated | |
| César Awards | 22 February 1986 | Most Promising Actress | Philippine Leroy-Beaulieu | Nominated | |
| Golden Globe Awards | 31 January 1987 | Best Foreign Language Film | Three Men and a Cradle | Nominated | |

== Remake and sequel ==
Trois Hommes et un couffin was remade by Hollywood in English as Three Men and a Baby in 1987.

The film was followed by a 2003 sequel titled 18 Years Later (18 ans après); Dussollier, Giraud, Boujenah and Leroy-Beaulieu reprised their roles, with Serreau's daughter Madeleine Besson playing the 18-year-old Marie.

== See also ==
- List of submissions to the 58th Academy Awards for Best Foreign Language Film
- List of French submissions for the Academy Award for Best Foreign Language Film
