= Un grand cri d'amour =

- Directed by: Josiane Balasko
- Written by: Josiane Balasko
- Produced by: Pierre Grunstein
- Starring: Josiane Balasko; Richard Berry; Daniel Prévost
- Cinematography: Gérard de Battista
- Edited by: Claudine Merlin
- Music by: Catherine Ringer
- Production companies: TF1 Films Production; Canal+ Josy Films; Katharina; Renn Productions
- Distributed by: AMLF
- Release date: 7 January 1998
- Running time: 90 minutes
- Country: France
- Language: French
- Budget: $6.6 million
- Box office: $3.4 million

Un grand cri d'amour (A great cry of love) is a 1998 French comedy film directed by Josiane Balasko. It was first seen as a play, which premièred in 1996 at the Théâtre de la Michodière with Josiane Balasko and Richard Berry in the main roles.

== Plot ==
Sylvestre (Daniel Ceccaldi), theater producer, sees his latest production threatened as the main actress unexpectedly departs from the project due to her pregnancy. To avoid calling off the production, he immediately seeks replacement and tries to convince the quick-tempered Hugo Martial (Richard Berry), only actor left, to work with Gigi Ortega (Josiane Balasko), an alcoholic and conceited woman, with whom he once formed a famed duo before their marriage fell apart. Léon (Daniel Prévost), director of the play, now has to rehearse day in and day out with two hateful and resentful actors, both settling accounts onstage, while Sylvester schemes a whole host of tricks to ensure the play sees it through.

== Cast ==
- Josiane Balasko as Gigi Ortega
- Richard Berry as Hugo Martial
- Daniel Prévost as Léon
- Daniel Ceccaldi as Sylvestre
- Claude Berri as Maillard
- Nadia Barentin as Bernadette
- Jean-Claude Bouillon as The journalist
- Philippe Bruneau as René
- Jean Sarrus as Jacky
- Jean-Michel Tinivelli as Jean-Paul
- Nicolas Silberg as The medecin
- Michel Field as himself

== Production ==
In 1998, the movie was screened at the Toronto International Film Festival and in 2009, at the Festival du Film Francophone in Greece.
