= Not Everybody's Lucky Enough to Have Communist Parents =

- Directed by: Jean-Jacques Zilbermann
- Written by: Nicolas Boukhrief; Jean-Jacques Zilbermann
- Produced by: Maurice Bernart; Alain Centonze; Luciano Gloor; Jean Labadie; Michel Propper; André Szöts
- Starring: Josiane Balasko
- Cinematography: Bruno Delbonnel; Thierry Jault
- Edited by: Joële Van Effenterre
- Music by: Serge Franklin
- Distributed by: BAC Films
- Release date: 1 December 1993
- Running time: 90 minutes
- Country: France
- Language: French
- Budget: $3.4 million
- Box office: $3 million

Not Everybody's Lucky Enough to Have Communist Parents (Tout le monde n'a pas eu la chance d'avoir des parents communistes) is a 1993 French comedy film directed by Jean-Jacques Zilbermann and starring Josiane Balasko. She received her second nomination to the César Award for Best Actress for this role.

== Plot ==
The film is set in 1958 during a referendum for the adoption of the Constitution of the Fifth French Republic. It is about the daily life of Irene, a communist activist who was rescued from concentration camps by the Red Army when she was young, and who married Bernard, a small Gaullist shopkeeper. Their political differences undermine the couple. In a historical moment, the Alexandrov Ensemble give a performance in France, allowing Irene to meet veterans of the Battle of Stalingrad in the sight of her jealous husband. She will do anything to convince him to vote no in the referendum.

== Cast ==
- Josiane Balasko as Irène
- Maurice Bénichou as Bernard
- Catherine Hiegel as Régine
- Jean-François Dérec as Uncle Charlot
- Viktor Neznanov as Ivan
- Aleksandr Piskaryov as Boris
- Aleksey Maslov as Sacha
- Jérémy Davis as Little Leon
- Christine Dejoux as Jeannette
- Jacques Herlin as Choumerski
- André Oumansky as Cousin Isaac

== Release ==
The film opened on 33 screens in Paris and grossed $262,278 in its opening week to finish in fourth place at the Paris box office.
