= The Joint Brothers =

- Directed by: Hervé Palud
- Written by: Hervé Palud; Igor Aptekman
- Produced by: Christian Fechner; Bernard Artigues
- Starring: Gérard Lanvin; Jacques Villeret; Josiane Balasko; Valérie Mairesse; Daniel Russo
- Cinematography: Jean-Jacques Tarbès
- Edited by: Roland Baubeau
- Music by: Jacques Delaporte
- Production companies: Les Films Christian Fechner; Les Films Optimistes; Films A2
- Distributed by: Gaumont Distribution
- Release date: 15 October 1986
- Running time: 90 minutes
- Country: France
- Language: French
- Box office: $16.3 million

The Joint Brothers or Les Frères Pétard is a French comedy film directed by Hervé Palud released in 1986.

== Cast ==
- Gérard Lanvin : Manu
- Jacques Villeret : Momo
- Josiane Balasko : Aline
- Valérie Mairesse : Brigitte
- Daniel Russo : Harky
- Thomas M. Pollard : Sammy Le Black
- Patrice Valota : Teuch
- Alain Pacadis : la balance
- Cheik Doukouré : Razzo
- Michel Galabru : Monsieur Jabert
- Philippe Khorsand : un flic
- Dominique Lavanant : la policière
- René Duclos : Nanard
- Norbert Letheule : Aldo
- Smaïn : un petit trafiquant dans le train
- Tina Aumont : la fêtarde déguisée
- Guy Cuevas : l'égyptien
