= Demi-soeur =

- Film poster
- Directed by: Josiane Balasko
- Written by: Josiane Balasko; Franck Lee Joseph
- Produced by: Cyril Colbeau-Justin; Jean-Baptiste Dupont; Josiane Balasko; Adrian Politowski; Romain Rousseau; Gilles Waterkeyn
- Starring: Josiane Balasko; Michel Blanc
- Cinematography: Sabine Lancelin
- Edited by: Andrea Sedláčková
- Music by: Christophe Julien
- Distributed by: StudioCanal
- Release date: 5 June 2013
- Running time: 90 minutes
- Country: France
- Language: French
- Budget: $8.5 million
- Box office: $1.3 million

Demi-soeur (lit. 'Half sister') is a 2013 French comedy film directed by Josiane Balasko and starring Balasko and Michel Blanc.

== Plot ==
Nenette is a lady who has the mental age of an eight year old. After the death of her mother, she leaves on a search of her father, but ends up meeting her half brother Paul, a surly pharmacist.

== Cast ==
- Josiane Balasko as Antoinette Novack
- Michel Blanc as Paul Bérard
- Brigitte Roüan as Véronique
- Françoise Lépine as Françoise
- George Aguilar as Silver
- Christine Murillo as Madame Lefèvre
- Grégoire Baujat as Maxime
- Sarah Suco as Too Much
- Jean-Yves Chatelais as Patrick Régnier
- Stéphan Wojtowicz as Master Bonvallet
- Chantal Banlier as Madame Lavreau
- Cléo Revel / Madeleine Revel as Lilas
- Souria Adèle as Yvonne
- Daniel-Jean Colloredo as The Monk
- Kader Boukhanef as Monsieur Belkhri
