= Josiane Balasko =

French actress, writer, and director (born 1950)

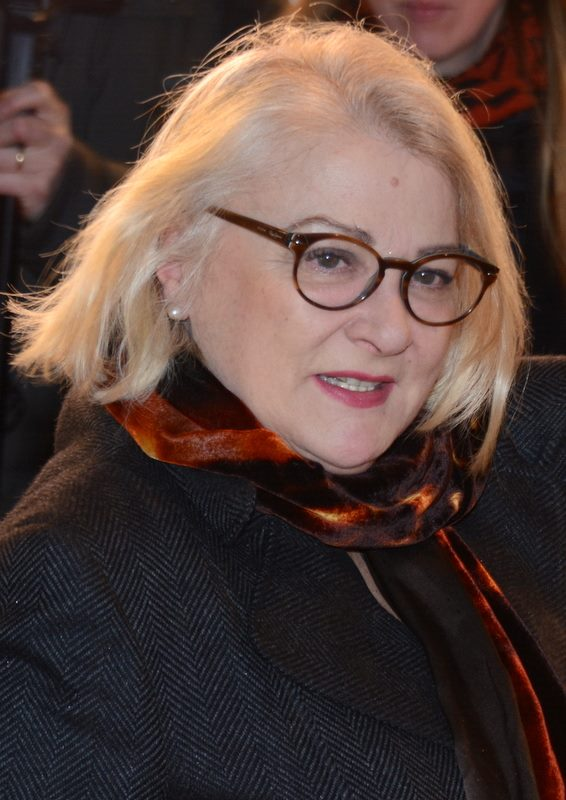
- Balasko in 2014
- Born: Josiane Balašković; 15 April 1950 (age 76); Paris, France
- Occupations: Actress, comedian, director, writer
- Years active: 1973–present
- Spouse: George Aguilar (m. 2003)
- Partner(s): Bruno Moynot (1974–1981); Philippe Berry (1982–1999)
- Children: 2, including Marilou Berry
- Relatives: Richard Berry (brother-in-law from her first marriage)
- Awards: César Award for Best Original Screenplay or Adaptation; 1996 French Twist; Honorary César; 2000 and 2021 (with the troupe Le Splendid)

Josiane Balasko, born Josiane Balašković (French: [ʒozjan balasko]; 15 April 1950), is a French actress, writer, and director. She has been nominated eight times for César Awards, and won three times.

== Career ==
One of Balasko's most recognized roles among English speakers is as a lesbian in 1995's Gazon maudit (French Twist). She won the 1996 César Award (shared with Telsche Boorman) for Best Original Screenplay or Adaptation, and was also nominated as Best Director. The movie was nominated for Best Film.

Balasko's other César nominations for Best Actress were for Too Beautiful for You (1989), Tout le monde n'a pas eu la chance d'avoir des parents communistes (1993), and That Woman (2003).

=== 1973–1980: Early years ===
Balasko began her career in 1973. She was 23 years old when she first appeared on screen, in the short L'Agression, with Patrick Bouchitey. She was in the movie L'an 01, directed by Jacques Doillon.

After an absence of three years she returned to the screen in 1976 in the film The Tenant, directed by Roman Polanski, with a screenplay written by him and Gérard Brach. The movie was based on the novel written by Roland Topor.

Balasco career exploded in 1977, when she appeared in seven films over the course of the year. She first appeared in Solveig et le Violon turc, with Eugène Ionesco and Dominique Lavanant. She played Simone in Une fille unique, alongside her boyfriend at the time, Bruno Moynot.

She appeared in Animal, directed by Claude Zidi, with a screenplay written by him, Michel Audiard, and Dominique Fabre. It was a big success with more than three million attendances in France; the movie was #5 in 1977 in France. She appeared in Pardon Mon Affaire, Too!, directed by Yves Robert and written by him and Jean-Loup Dabadie. The movie was also a big success, with more than two million attending in France alone, and was #8 in 1977 in France.

She played Nadine in This Sweet Sickness, directed by Claude Miller, based on the novel written by Patricia Highsmith. The movie starred Gérard Depardieu, Miou-Miou, Claude Piéplu, Dominique Laffin, and Christian Clavier.

She also acted in Monsieur Papa, directed by Philippe Monnier, and with dialogue written by Jean-Marie Poiré. Balasko starred alongside Claude Brasseur, Nathalie Baye, Daniel Auteuil and Éva Darlan.

In 1978, Balasko played in "Si vous n'aimez pas ça, n'en dégoûtez pas les autres", with Gérard Jugnot and Thierry Lhermitte, and in "Les Petits Câlins", directed by Jean-Marie Poiré, alongside Dominique Laffin, Françoise Bertin and Gérard Jugnot. Then, she was in La Tortue sur le dos.

Balasko had the leading role in the comedy "Pauline et l'Ordinateur", for which she wrote the dialogue and where she acted next to Gérard Jugnot, Éva Darlan, Jacques Attali and Marie-Anne Chazel. Finally, she played Nathalie Morin in the cult comedy Les Bronzés, directed by Patrice Leconte, with her friends from Le Splendid, Marie-Anne Chazel, Michel Blanc, Gérard Jugnot, Thierry Lhermitte, Christian Clavier and Dominique Lavanant. The movie was a hit with more than two million attendances.

In 1979, Balasko played Emma-Ammé in one episode of the TV Mini-Series, "Les Quatre Cents Coups de Virginie", alongside Anémone. Then Nathalie Morin again, in the sequel Les Bronzés font du ski with the same cast, which was also a success with more than a millions attendances. She also appeared as a client in the movie "Les héros n'ont pas froid aux oreilles", with Daniel Auteuil, Gérard Jugnot, Roland Giraud, Gérard Lanvin, Michel Blanc, Thierry Lhermitte, Marie-Anne Chazel and Christian Clavier.

=== 1981–1990: directing debut ===
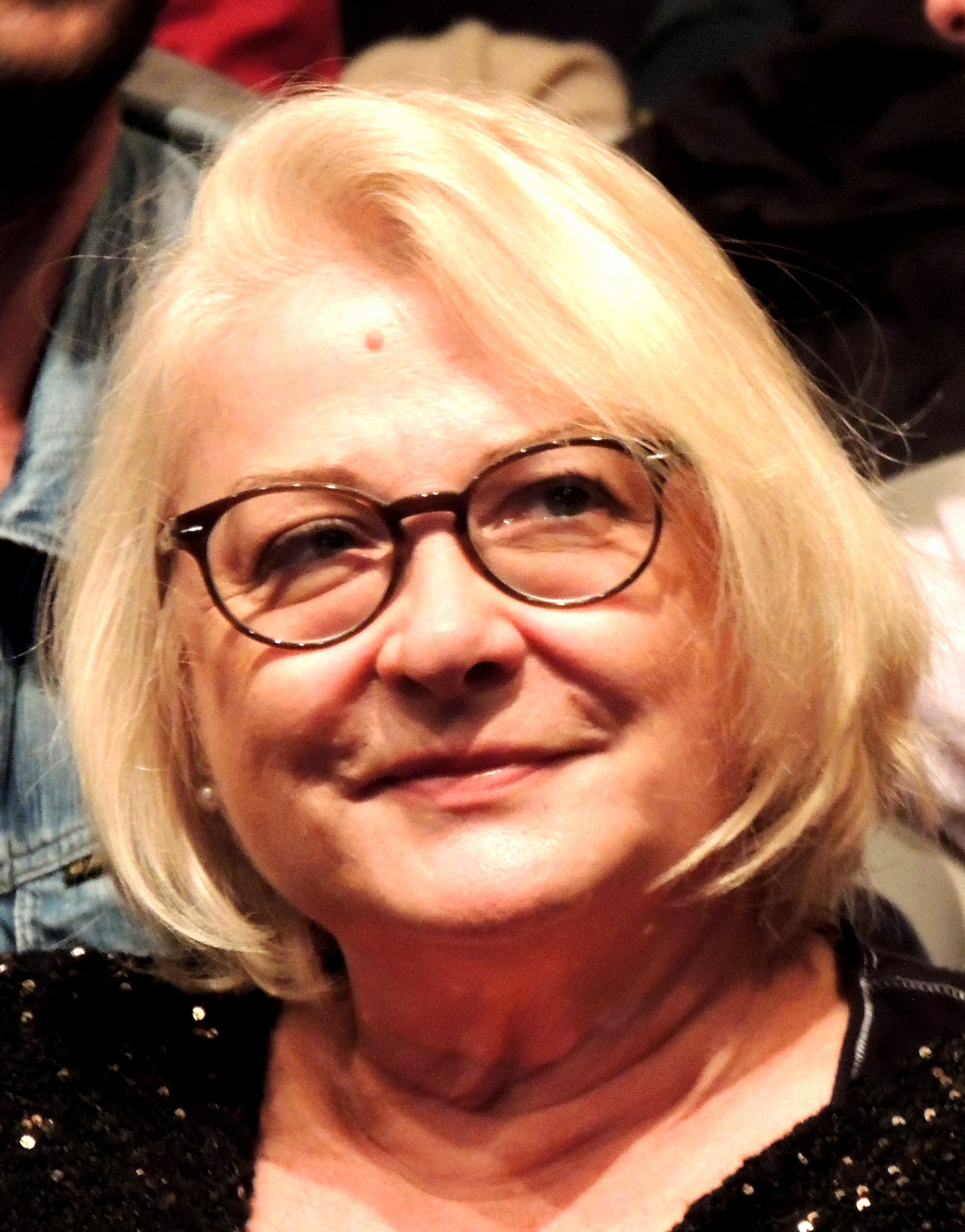
Josiane Balasko in October 2013 to Namur

1981 was very successful for Balasko. First, she played Louise in Clara et les Chics Types. Later, she had the leading role in the comedy Les hommes préfèrent les grosses. The movie was a commercial success. It was directed by Jean-Marie Poiré, who co-wrote the film, with Balasko. After this, she was in another comedy named Le Maître d'école, directed by Claude Berri. This film was also commercially successful, the #9 movie at the French Box Office in 1981. She played Colette, a supporting role, in Hotel America, directed by André Téchiné. It starred Catherine and Patrick Dewaere.

In 1982, Balasko was in another cult movie, Le Père Noël est une ordure, directed for the third time by Jean-Marie Poiré. The film was commercially successful.

In 1983, Balasko had two comedy hits. Papy fait de la résistance, which was #7 in the 1983 French box office, and Signes extérieurs de richesse, another success.

In 1984, Balasko played a supporting role in the comedy P'tit Con, directed by Gérard Lauzier. She had the leading role in the comedy, La smala, directed by Jean-Loup Hubert. Finally, she played a supporting role in the comedy La vengeance du serpent à plumes directed by Gérard Oury. The movie was her biggest success of that year. In 1985, she appeared in the movie Tranches de vie directed by François Leterrier. That year she also made her directoral debut with the comedy Sac de noeuds, which she wrote, directed and starred in.

=== 1990 onward ===
Since 1990, Balasko has enjoyed a busy career acting in numerous films in a very wide variety of roles but having an international directing success in 1995 with Gazon Maudit (French Twist), in which she co-starred with Alain Chabat and gained her a César for Best Original Screenplay or Adaptation and a nomination for Best Film. In 2006 she was re-united once again with the Le Splendid team for another Bronzés film Bronzés 3: Amis pour La Vie.

=== 2012–present ===
In 2018, Balasko record a song with the rapper Mac Tyer on his album C'est la street mon pote.

In February 2019, Balasko received the Crystal Comedy Award during the 4th Festival International du Film de Comédie de Liège to reward her career.

== Personal life ==
Bruno Moynot was her partner from 1974 until 1981. In a second union with sculptor Philippe Berry (brother of actor Richard Berry), she had a daughter, Marilou Berry (born 1 February 1983), also an actress, and an adopted son, Rudy Berry (born 1988). She divorced from Philippe Berry in 1999 and married American actor George Aguilar in 2003, whom she met on the set of The Frenchman's Son in 1999.

== Filmography ==
=== Actress ===
Key
†	Denotes films that have not yet been released

Year	Title	Role	Notes
1973	The Year 01		
1976	The Tenant	Viviane	
1976	An Unusual Girl	Simone	
1977	Pardon Mon Affaire, Too!	Josy	
1977	This Sweet Sickness	Nadine	
1977	Animal	Supermarket Girl	
1977	Herbie Goes to Monte Carlo	Uncredited	
1977	Monsieur Papa		
1978	French Fried Vacation	Nathalie Morin	
1978	The Little Wheedlers	Corinne	
1978	Pauline et l'Ordinateur	Pauline	
1978	Si vous n'aimez pas ça, n'en dégoûtez pas les autres	A spectator	
1978	Like a Turtle on Its Back		
1979	French Fried Vacation 2	Nathalie Morin	
1979	Heroes Are Not Wet Behind the Ears	A client	
1980	Les Quatre Cents Coups de Virginie	Emma-Ammé	TV Mini-Series
1981	Men Prefer Fat Girls	Lydie Langlois	
1981	Le Maître d'école	Mrs. Lajoie	
1981	Hotel America	Colette	
1981	Clara et les Chics Types	Louise	
1982	Santa Claus Is a Stinker	Madame Musquin	
1983	Signes extérieurs de richesse	Béatrice Flamand	
1983	Gramps Is in the Resistance	The pharmacist	
1984	P'tit Con	Rolande	
1984	La smala	Simone	
1984	The Vengeance of the Winged Serpent	Jackie	
1985	All Mixed Up	Anita	
1985	Slices of Life	Madame Dupuis	
1986	Nuit d'ivresse	Frède	
1986	The Joint Brothers	Aline	
1987	Lady Cops	Insp. Mireille Molineux	
1988	Without Fear or Blame	Handmaid	
1988	Une nuit à l'Assemblée Nationale	The journalist	
1989	Too Beautiful for You	Colette Chevassu	
1991	My Life Is Hell	Leah Lemonier	
1991	The Professional Secrets of Dr. Apfelgluck	The scientist	
1993	Not Everybody's Lucky Enough to Have Communist Parents	Irène	
1993	Shadow of a Doubt	Sophia	
1994	Dead Tired	Herself	
1995	French Twist	Marijo	
1997	Didier	Madame Massart	
1997	Arlette	Arlette Bathiat	
1998	Un grand cri d'amour	Gigi Ortega	
1999	The Frenchman's Son	Suzanne	
2000	The Libertine	Baroness Holbach	
2000	Actors	André Dussollier 2	
2000	Chicken Run	Bernadette	French Voice
2001	A Crime in Paradise	Lucienne Braconnier	
2001	Absolutely Fabulous	Edith "Eddie" Mousson	
2002	The Race	Madame Jo	
2003	That Woman	Michèle Varin	
2004	Madame Édouard	Nina Tchitchi	
2005	The Ex-Wife of My Life	Marie-Pierre Sarrazin	
2005	It's Our Life!	Blanche Delhomme	
2005	I Saw Ben Barka Get Killed	Marguerite Duras	
2006	French Fried Vacation 3	Nathalie Morin	
2006	David Nolande	Sofia	TV series (1 Episode)
2007	The Red Inn	Rose Martin	
2007	The Key	Michèle Varin	
2008	A French Gigolo	Irène	
2008	Ruby Blue	Stéphanie	
2008	A Day at the Museum	Mother in Chanel	
2008	Françoise Dolto, le désir de vivre	Françoise Dolto	TV movie
2009	The Hedgehog	Renée Michel	
2009	Park Benches	Solange Renivelle	
2009	Neuilly Yo Mama!	School's director	
2010	Holiday	Christiane Mercier	
2011	A Happy Event	Claire	
2011	Beur sur la ville	Mamie Nova	
2012	Sport de filles	Joséphine de Silène	
2012	Maman	Paulette Mine	
2012	Mes héros	Olga	
2013	Demi-soeur	Antoinette Novack	
2014	Aunt Hilda!	Dolorès	
2014	Les Gazelles	Brigitte	
2014	The law of Barbara	Barbara Malo	TV Mini-Series
2015	The Roommates Party	Alexandra Leclère	
2015	Miraculous: Tales of Ladybug & Cat Noir	Josiane / Sarah	TV series (1 Episode)
2016	Back to Mom's	Jacqueline Mazerin	
2016	Arrête ton cinéma	Brigitte	
2016	Joséphine, Pregnant & Fabulous	Josephine's mother	
2016	Par tous les seins	Voice	Short
2017	Let the Sunshine In	Maxime	
2017	The New Adventures of Cinderella	Josépha	
2018	Bécassine	Mademoiselle Châtaigne	
2018	Volontaire	Muriel Baer	
2018	J'ai perdu Albert	Simone Le Couidec	
2018	Neuilly sa mère, sa mère !	Madame Bachelot	
2019	All Inclusive	Lulu	
2019	Les envoûtés	Leonora Evesco	
2019	Beaux-parents	Coline Rossi	
2019	15 Minutes of War	Michèle Sampieri	
2019	By the Grace of God	Irène Thomassin	
2019	Vous êtes jeunes vous êtes beaux	Mona	
2019	Le Bazar de la Charité	Madame Huchon	TV Mini-Series
2020	L'esprit de famille	Marguerite	
2020	La pièce rapportée	Adélaïde Château-Têtard	
2021	Tralala	Lili Rivière	
2021	C'est la vie	Dominique	
2021	Mes très chers enfants	Chantal Blanc	
2021	Un tour chez ma fille...	Jacqueline Mazerin	
2023	Des mains en or	Martha	
2024	Captives	Bobotte	
2024	When Fall Is Coming	Marie-Claude	
2025	Délocalisés	Marianne	
2025	Escort Boys	Welder client	TV series (2 episodes)
2026	L'arnaqueuse	Massena	
2026	Mauvaise Pioche	Édith Benchemoul	
2026	Tombé du ciel	Soeur Catherine	

=== Filmmaker ===
Year	Title
1985	Sac de noeuds
1987	Les keufs
1991	My Life Is Hell
1995	French Twist
1998	Un grand cri d'amour
2005	L'Ex-femme de ma vie
2008	Cliente
2013	Demi-soeur

=== Box-office ===
Movies starring or featuring Josiane Balasko with more than one million tickets sold at movie theatres in France.

	Films	Year	France (entries)
1	Les Bronzés 3: Amis pour la vie	2006	10,355,930
2	Papy fait de la résistance	1983	4,104,082
3	French Twist	1995	3,990,094
4	Animal	1977	3,157,789
5	Le Maître d'école	1981	3,015,596
6	Didier	1997	2,902,960
7	La vengeance du serpent à plumes	1984	2,663,303
8	Neuilly sa mère!	2009	2,517,140
9	Les Bronzés	1978	2,308,644
10	Back to Mom's	2016	2,198,341
11	Les Frères Pétard	1986	2,179,370
12	A Crime in Paradise	2001	2,137,829
13	Pardon Mon Affaire, Too!	1977	2,080,789
14	Too Beautiful for You	1989	2,031,131
15	Grosse fatigue	1994	2,015,230
16	Les hommes préfèrent les grosses	1981	1,931,038
17	Le Père Noël est une ordure	1982	1,582,732
18	Les Bronzés font du ski	1979	1,535,781
19	The Race	2002	1,456,267
20	Nuit d'ivresse	1986	1,381,464
21	Absolument fabuleux	2001	1,370,394
22	My Life Is Hell	1991	1,170,523
23	The Roommates Party	2015	1,169,659
24	Neuilly sa mère, sa mère!	2018	1,144,597
25	Signes extérieurs de richesse	1983	1,074,802
26	Les Keufs	1987	1,071,467

== Theater ==
=== As actress ===
Year	Title	Author	Director
1970	La pipelette ne pipa pas	Josiane Balasko	Josiane Balasko
1971–74	Quand j'srai grande, j'srai paranoïaque	Josiane Balasko	Vera Gregh
1972–74	Jeanne l'ébouriffée	Catherine Dasté	Catherine Dasté
1975	Silence là-dedans	Josiane Balasko	Josiane Balasko
1976	Le Pot de terre contre le pot de vin	Le Splendid	Le Splendid
1976–77	Ginette Lacaze	Coluche	Coluche
1976–77	Amour, coquillages et crustacés	Le Splendid	Le Splendid
1978–80	Bunny's bar	Josiane Balasko	Josiane Balasko
1979–80	Le Père Noël est une ordure	Le Splendid	Le Splendid
1985–86	Nuit d'ivresse	Josiane Balasko	Josiane Balasko
1988–89	L'Ex-femme de ma vie	Josiane Balasko	Josiane Balasko
1992–94	Shirley Valentine	Willy Russell	Josiane Balasko
1995–97	Un grand cri d'amour	Josiane Balasko	Josiane Balasko
2005–07	Dernier rappel	Josiane Balasko	Josiane Balasko
2010–12	La nuit sera chaude	Josiane Balasko	Josiane Balasko
2014–15	Un grand moment de solitude	Josiane Balasko	Josiane Balasko
2016–18	The Woman Destroyed	Simone de Beauvoir	Hélène Fillières
2021–24	Un chalet à Gstaad	Josiane Balasko	Josiane Balasko
2026	Ça, c’est l’amour	Jean Robert-Charrier	Julie-Anne Roth

== Writer ==
- 2004 : Cliente, it became a movie in 2008 directed and starring Balasko, with Nathalie Baye, Éric Caravaca, Isabelle Carré, Catherine Hiegel, Marilou Berry, George Aguilar, Richard Berry and Maria Schneider.
- 2006 : Parano express
- 2011 : La nuit sera chaude, it became a play in 2011–2012
- 2019 : Jamaiplu

== Awards and nominations ==
Year	Award	Nominated work	Result
1990	César Award for Best Actress	Too Beautiful for You	Nominated
1994	César Award for Best Actress	Not Everybody's Lucky Enough to Have Communist Parents	Nominated
1996	César Award for Best Original Screenplay or Adaptation	French Twist	Won
1996	César Award for Best Film	French Twist	Nominated
1996	César Award for Best Director	French Twist	Nominated
1996	GLAAD Media Award for Outstanding Film – Limited Release	French Twist	Nominated
1996	Golden Globe Award for Best Foreign Language Film	French Twist	Nominated
1996	Lumière Award for Best Screenplay	French Twist	Won
1996	Palm Springs International Film Festival - Best Foreign Language Film	French Twist	Won
2000	Honorary César	-	Honored
2004	César Award for Best Actress	That Woman	Nominated
2010	Women Film Critics Circle - Courage in Acting Award	The Hedgehog	Nominated
2020	César Award for Best Supporting Actress	By the Grace of God	Nominated
2021	Honorary César avec la troupe du Splendid	-	Honored
2026	Molière Award for Best Actress	Ça, c’est l’amour	Pending

== See also ==
- List of female film and television directors
- List of LGBT-related films directed by women
