= The Ex-Wife of My Life =

- Theatrical release poster
- Directed by: Josiane Balasko
- Written by: Josiane Balasko
- Produced by: Josiane Balasko; Louis Becker
- Starring: Karin Viard; Thierry Lhermitte; Josiane Balasko
- Cinematography: Pascal Gennesseaux
- Edited by: Claudine Merlin
- Music by: Mark Russell
- Production company: ICE3
- Distributed by: Warner Bros. Pictures
- Release date: 2 February 2005
- Running time: 95 minutes
- Country: France
- Language: French
- Budget: $8.2 million
- Box office: $6.8 million

The Ex-Wife of My Life or L'Ex-femme de ma vie is a 2005 French comedy-drama film directed by Josiane Balasko and starring Balasko, Karin Viard and Thierry Lhermitte. It is the sixth film directed by Balasko.

== Plot ==
Tom is a successful popular novelist. He will soon marry again. However, he meets his previous wife in a restaurant. She is penniless, homeless, and seven and a half months pregnant. She asks him for help. Tom decides to host her. Quickly, his ex-wife and her psychiatrist friend invade his home.

== Cast ==
- Thierry Lhermitte as Tom
- Karin Viard as Nina
- Josiane Balasko as Marie-Pierre Sarrazin
- Nadia Farès as Ariane
- Didier Flamand as René
- Micheline Dax as Madame Belin
- Nicolas Silberg as Bourdin
- Francia Seguy as Madeleine
- Stella Rocha as Tamira
- Walter Dickerson as Elvire
- Joseph Menant as Lulu
- Sylvie Herbert as Geneviève
- George Aguilar as Forcené M. Alvarez
- Dolly Golden as Cynthia
- Raymonde Bourgeois as Rebecca
- Dominique Aliot as Marilyn
- Luciano Federico as The cooker
- Lucien Jean-Baptiste as The inspector

== Release ==
The film premiered at the Marrakech International Film Festival in 2004.
