= French Fried Vacation 2 =

- Theatrical release poster
- Directed by: Patrice Leconte
- Produced by: Yves Rousset-Rouard
- Starring: Josiane Balasko; Michel Blanc; Marie-Anne Chazel; Christian Clavier; Gérard Jugnot; Thierry Lhermitte; Dominique Lavanant
- Cinematography: Jean-François Robin
- Edited by: Noëlle Boisson
- Music by: Pierre Bachelet
- Production company: Trinacra Films
- Distributed by: Compagnie Commerciale Française Cinématographique (CCFC)
- Release date: 22 November 1979
- Running time: 83 minutes
- Country: France
- Language: French
- Box office: $11.5 million

French Fried Vacation 2 (Les Bronzés font du ski) is a classic 1979 French comedy directed by Patrice Leconte.

It is a sequel to Les Bronzés (1978), and it was followed by Les Bronzés 3: Amis pour la vie (2006).

== Plot ==
The characters from the first movie get together again, this time in the ski resort of Val d'Isère where Jérôme, Gigi and Popeye work.

Jérôme and Gigi are now married: Gigi owns a pancake house while Jérôme has a medical practice.

Nathalie and Bernard, reconciled and fairly "nouveaux riches", are owners of a timeshare.

Jean-Claude is still desperately trying to seduce any girl that he sees, and still fails pathetically. Christiane has an affair with Marius, a married man who is also much older than her.

Popeye is now far less cocksure: after his countless adulterous flings, he is now humiliated by his wife who openly cheats on him. Moreover, while he claims to be the manager of a ski shop, it soon becomes clear that his wife and her lover are the ones in charge as they constantly rub his nose in his mistakes, question his integrity and bluntly override his decisions in front of his friends.

During a backcountry skiing trip, the group gets lost. They spend the night in a mountain hut but are unable to get any rest as they are kept awake by the noises of three horny Italian skiers with whom they must share the place. They leave the next morning but still cannot find their way back to the ski resort. Their situation becomes increasingly dire and tensions rise but they are finally rescued by two rugged mountain dwellers, who take them back to their spartan chalet. There, the men give the group some "traditional" food and drinks. First, a mixture of old cheese rinds with worms ("for the meat"), soaked in fat and wood alcohol. Then, a liquor made with shallot and garlic juice ("because shallot alone would be too bland") and a desiccated toad, which Jérome describes as strong enough to unclog toilets while his friends gasp for air or collapse under the table, in a parody of the famous drinking scene in Les Tontons Flingueurs.

They finally make it back to the resort, which was literally just around the corner from their rescuers' dwelling, and soon go their separate ways as the holidays come to an end.

== Cast and roles ==
- Michel Blanc - Jean-Claude Dusse
- Marie-Anne Chazel - Gigi
- Christian Clavier - Jérôme
- Gérard Jugnot - Bernard Morin
- Josiane Balasko - Nathalie Morin
- Thierry Lhermitte - Popeye
- Dominique Lavanant - Christiane
- Maurice Chevit - Marius
- Bruno Moynot - Gilbert
