= French Fried Vacation 3 =

- Theatrical release poster
- French: Les Bronzés 3: Amis pour la vie
- Directed by: Patrice Leconte
- Produced by: Christian Fechner; Hervé Truffaut; Jean-Louis Nieuwbourg
- Starring: Josiane Balasko; Michel Blanc; Marie-Anne Chazel; Christian Clavier; Gérard Jugnot; Thierry Lhermitte
- Cinematography: Jean-Marie Dreujou
- Edited by: Joëlle Hache
- Music by: Étienne Perruchon
- Distributed by: Warner Bros. Pictures
- Release date: 1 February 2006
- Running time: 97 minutes
- Budget: $35 million
- Box office: $84.2 million

French Fried Vacation 3 (French: Les Bronzés 3: Amis pour la vie, lit. 'The sun-tanned ones 3: Friends for life'), released in some English-speaking countries as Friends Forever, is a 2006 French comedy film, and the sequel to Les Bronzés (1978) and Les Bronzés font du ski (1979). Like the first two films, it is directed by Patrice Leconte and stars mostly members of the theatrical/film troupe Le Splendid. Les Bronzés 3: Amis pour la vie follows up on the revelers from the first two films, now in their 50s.

== Plot ==
At a secluded luxury hotel in Sardinia owned by Graziella, beautiful Italian wife of the still handsome Popeye who now likes to be known as Robert, the other characters from the first two films, now in their 50s, start arriving. Robert is distracted by pursuing an affair with a girl who works in the kitchens and insists he leave his wife. Bernard and Nathalie, who own a chain of opticians' shops, have a son who arrives to announce his civil union with an older man. J-C is a bald hairdresser in the US, living with Gigi who has acquired enormous silicon breasts requiring an F cup bra. Jérôme, struck off for malpractice and divorced, is reduced to giving driving lessons. Christiane, scarred for life by an operation Jérôme botched, has with Miguel joined a weird Indian sect and seeks revenge.

Gigi, flirtatious as ever, has a resumed fling with Jérôme. Nathalie, to punish Bernard for reacting so hostilely to his son's homosexuality, claims she conceived him with another man in the alpine cabin where they all spent a night 27 years ago. Graziella, fed up with the bickering and bed-hopping of her husband's embarrassing French friends, throws the lot out to spend the night with their luggage on the beach. Then she learns from the last character Gilbert, a sacked ex-employee, about Robert's infidelity and throws him out too. In the morning the group are joined by a boatload of illegal immigrants from North Africa, with whom they are bundled into vans by the police and taken to an internment camp.

== Cast ==
- Josiane Balasko as Nathalie Morin
- Gérard Jugnot as Bernard Morin
- Michel Blanc as Jean-Claude "J-C" Dusse
- Marie-Anne Chazel as Gisèle "Gigi" André
- Christian Clavier as Jérôme Tarayre
- Thierry Lhermitte as Robert "Popeye" Lespinasse
- Ornella Muti as Graziella Lespinasse
- Dominique Lavanant as Christiane Weissmuller
- Martin Lamotte as Miguel Weissmuller
- Bruno Moynot as Gilbert Jambier
- Arthur Jugnot as Benjamin Morin

== Reception ==
The film was number 1 at the French box-office in 2006.
