= French Fried Vacation =

- Theatrical release poster
- Directed by: Patrice Leconte
- Screenplay by: Patrice Leconte; Le Splendid
- Produced by: Yves Rousset-Rouard
- Starring: Josiane Balasko; Michel Blanc; Marie-Anne Chazel; Christian Clavier; Gérard Jugnot; Thierry Lhermitte
- Cinematography: Jean-François Robin
- Music by: Michel Bernholc; Serge Gainsbourg
- Production company: Trinacra Films
- Distributed by: Compagnie Commerciale Française Cinématographique
- Release date: 22 November 1978; (France)
- Running time: 92 minutes
- Country: France
- Language: French
- Box office: $17.3 million

French Fried Vacation (French: Les Bronzés, [le bʁɔ̃ze]) is a 1978 cult French comedy film directed by Patrice Leconte. The film satirizes life resorts such as Club Med. It was the film breakthrough of the French comedy group Le Splendid. Josiane Balasko, Michel Blanc, Marie-Anne Chazel, Gérard Jugnot, Thierry Lhermitte and Christian Clavier wrote and created together the play "Amours, Coquillages et Crustacés", and drew the scenario for Les Bronzés from this café-théâtre piece. The film has achieved cult status in France, where it sold 2.2 million tickets during its initial theatrical release.

It was followed by two sequels, also directed by Patrice Leconte: Les Bronzés font du ski (1979) and Les Bronzés 3: Amis pour la vie (2006).

== Plot ==
In 1978, Gigi, Jérôme, Christiane, Jean-Claude, and Bernard simultaneously arrive at the Club Med in Assinie, Côte d'Ivoire, each with their distinct personalities. The vacation spot operates on a system where guests pay with beads worn as necklaces and enjoy a series of organized activities and shared leisure facilitated by "gentil organisateurs" (G.O.) for the "gentil membres" (clients).

Bernard reunites with his wife Nathalie, who has been at the village for a week. Popeye, the sports chief, along with animators Bobo and Bourseault, welcome them. The small group quickly forms bonds, as everyone hopes to make new connections. Both Bernard and Nathalie decide to have extramarital affairs, while Jérôme, a doctor, and Jean-Claude engage in unsuccessful attempts at flirting. Gigi finds love with Bourseault, while Christiane faces rejection.

However, a serious incident marks the end of their stay as Bourseault, Gigi's love interest, unexpectedly dies from a stingray sting. Following this tragedy, Nathalie and Bernard decide to stop their affairs, especially after Jean-Claude's unsuccessful advances. Bobo resigns in the aftermath.

== Cast ==
- Josiane Balasko as Nathalie Morin
- Gérard Jugnot as Bernard Morin
- Marie-Anne Chazel as Gigi
- Christian Clavier as Docteur Jerome Tarere
- Michel Blanc as Jean-Claude Dusse
- Thierry Lhermitte as Popeye
- Luis Rego as Bobo
- Martin Lamotte as Miguel
- Dominique Lavanant as Christiane
- Bruno Moynot as Gilbert Sellman
- Michel Creton as Bourseault
- Guy Laporte as Marcus
- Pascale Deneu
- Marion Lanez
- Sylvie Obry
