= Dead Tired =

1994 film

- Theatrical release poster
- Directed by: Michel Blanc
- Written by: Michel Blanc; Bertrand Blier; Jacques Audiard
- Produced by: Daniel Toscan du Plantier
- Starring: Michel Blanc; Carole Bouquet
- Cinematography: Eduardo Serra
- Edited by: Maryline Monthieux
- Music by: René-Marc Bini
- Production companies: Gaumont; TF1 Films Production
- Distributed by: Gaumont Buena Vista International
- Release date: 18 May 1994
- Running time: 92 minutes
- Country: France
- Language: French
- Budget: $9.5 million
- Box office: $13.2 million

Dead Tired (French: Grosse Fatigue) is a 1994 French comedy film directed by Michel Blanc. It was entered into the 1994 Cannes Film Festival.

== Plot ==
Michel Blanc is a renowned film actor. However, he has been accused of sexually abusing actresses Josiane Balasko, Charlotte Gainsbourg and Mathilda May, of behaving like a cad at Cannes and of accepting dubious publicity deals, such as appearances in supermarkets, behind the back of his agent. Although Blanc knows of his own innocence, the evidence seems to prove otherwise. He seeks assistance from fellow actress Carole Bouquet to shed light on this matter, and he discovers that he has a perfect double, Patrick Olivier, who, having suffered all his life from his likeness to Michel Blanc, has decided to use this to his financial advantage.

== Cast ==
- Michel Blanc as himself / Patrick Olivier
- Carole Bouquet as herself
- Philippe Noiret as himself
- Josiane Balasko as herself
- Marie-Anne Chazel as herself
- Christian Clavier as himself
- Guillaume Durand as himself
- Charlotte Gainsbourg as herself
- David Hallyday as himself
- Estelle Lefébure as herself
- Gérard Jugnot as himself
- Dominique Lavanant as herself
- Thierry Lhermitte as himself
- Mathilda May as herself
- Roman Polanski as himself
- Andrée Damant as Madame Volpi
- Dorothée Jemma as The Pregnant Woman
- Philippe du Janerand as Inspector
- François Morel as Inspector's assistant
- Jean-Louis Richard as Psychiatrist
- Bruno Moynot as The driver
- Raoul Billerey as Michel Blanc's father
- Dominique Besnehard as Michel Blanc's agent
- Bernard Farcy as The ANPE employee
- Vincent Grass as The swinger

== Reception ==
=== Critical response ===
On Rotten Tomatoes, the film holds an approval rating of 50%, based on 6 reviews, with an average rating of 6.8/10.

=== Box office ===
In its opening week in France, the film grossed 14.3 million French Franc ($2.5 million), finishing second to fellow Cannes opener La Reine Margot at the box office. In its second week it expanded from 189 to 283 screens and became the number one film in France and was there for two weeks.

== Accolades ==
Award / Film Festival	Category	Recipients and nominees	Result
Cannes Film Festival	Palme d'Or		Nominated
Cannes Film Festival	Best Screenplay Award	Michel Blanc	Won
Cannes Film Festival	Vulcan Award	Pitof	Won
César Awards	Best Original Screenplay or Adaptation	Michel Blanc	Nominated
