= Gramps Is in the Resistance =

- Theatrical release poster
- Directed by: Jean-Marie Poiré
- Produced by: Christian Fechner
- Starring: Christian Clavier; Michel Galabru; Gérard Jugnot; Martin Lamotte; Dominique Lavanant; Jacqueline Maillan; Jacques Villeret; Roland Giraud
- Distributed by: AMLF
- Release date: 26 October 1983
- Running time: 102 minutes
- Country: France
- Language: French
- Box office: $11 million

Gramps Is in the Resistance or Papy fait de la résistance is a French war comedy film directed by Jean-Marie Poiré in 1983.

The film stars the troupe of the Le Splendid and is based on a play written and originally performed by them. A parody of the films about World War II and the French Resistance, the film features a large ensemble cast, in the manner of productions like The Longest Day or Is Paris Burning?.

== Plot ==
Héléna Bourdelle, a.k.a. "La Bourdelle", is a world-renowned opera singer and the wife of maestro André Bourdelle. They live in a luxurious hôtel particulier in Paris, with their three grown-up children—Bernadette, Colette and Guy-Hubert—and André's father, known as "Gramps". When Nazi Germany occupies France, André becomes a leader of a Resistance cell but he is killed by the accidental explosion of a grenade. Two years later, the family's mansion is requisitioned by the German occupation authorities to accommodate Wehrmacht general Hermann Spontz, transferred from Eastern Front to Paris. The Germans brutally take over the whole house and leave the family occupying the cellar, and complaining to the Kommandantur about the excesses of Spontz and his men. While in the Kommandantur, Madame Bourdelle, her daughter Bernadette and Michel Taupin, a tenant in the family house, help by chance the escape a British RAF airman, and are then forced to hide him in their cellar.

Michel Taupin woos without success Bernadette, after initially having views on Colette. His insistent desire to join the Resistance leads to many adventures. Imprisoned after the episode at the Kommandantur, he meets a resistant, Felix, who confides in him, thinking he is about to be shot by the Germans. When they are freed by an elusive masked vigilante known as "Super-Resistant", Felix finds himself unable to get rid of Michel.

The family is also persecuted by Ramirez, the former Paris Opera caretaker and a fierce collaborationist who has become a Gestapo agent. Ramirez seeks to take revenge on the Bourdelles but they are protected by General Spontz, who is an admirer of Héléna Bourdelle and who has a soft spot for Bernadette. Ramirez finally discovers that Guy-Hubert, a seemingly cowardly and effeminate hairdresser, is actually "Super-Resistant" and the boss of Felix; Spontz, who despises and routinely humiliates Ramirez, does not believe him.

Although she had vowed not to sing while there were Germans in France, Madame Bourdelle is forced by General Spontz to attend a reception in honour of Hitler's half-brother, Marshal Ludwig von Apfelstrudel, held in a castle near Paris. With the help of Michel Taupin, the Resistance plans to detonate a bomb in the dining room. The operation fails and the Bourdelles and Taupin are about to be arrested but they are saved by Super-Resistant, who captures von Apfelstrudel, Ramirez and all the German generals, with the help of his men and of Gramps.

The story seems to end, but proves to be a "film within the film", and gives way to a contemporary television debate, designed to address the period of occupation, and to report on the reality of the depicted events in the film. The show brings together Bernadette Bourdelle and General Spontz (now happily married), Guy-Hubert, Adolfo Ramirez (son of Ramirez, who came from Bolivia to defend his father's memory), and Michel Taupin (now Minister of Veterans Affairs). Soon, the discussion turns to disaster: Ramirez Jr. insults and defames the other protagonists of the story, who start to beat him up on the TV set, forcing the host to cut the transmission.

== Cast ==
- Christian Clavier as Michel Taupin, professor of Greek and Latin
- Michel Galabru as Jean-Robert Bourdelle "Gramps"
- Dominique Lavanant as Bernadette Bourdelle
- Jacqueline Maillan as Héléna Bourdelle
- Jacques Villeret as Ludwig Von Apfelstrudel, Hitler's half-brother
- Roland Giraud as General Hermann Spontz
- Gérard Jugnot as Ramirez, agent of the French Gestapo and his son, Adolfo Ramirez
- Martin Lamotte as Guy-Hubert Bourdelle / Super-Resistant
- Pauline Lafont as Colette Bourdelle
- Jeffrey Kime as Harry McBarrett, the RAF Officer
- Jean Carmet as André Bourdelle
- Julien Guiomar as Colonel Vincent of the Free French forces
- Jacques François as Jacques de Frémontel, "Félix"
- Josiane Balasko as the pharmacist
- Michel Blanc as Father Leboeuf, the priest
- Jean-Claude Brialy as tennis player sycophant
- Bernard Giraudeau as arrested resistant (listed in the credits as "the film's shortest role")
- Thierry Lhermitte as SS Standartenführer
- Jean Yanne as militiaman Murat
- Roger Carel as General Muller
- Patrick Petit-Jean as Enrique, Super-Resistant's dwarf assistant
- Alain Jérôme as himself (TV host)
- Bruno Moynot as Flandu
- Jean Négroni as the narrator
