= Nuit d'ivresse (film) =

- Directed by: Bernard Nauer
- Written by: Josiane Balasko; Thierry Lhermitte; Michel Blanc
- Starring: Josiane Balasko; Thierry Lhermitte
- Cinematography: Carlo Varini
- Edited by: Olivier Morel
- Production companies: Cinq Productions; Cofimage; Ice Films; Les Films Flam
- Distributed by: Films Christian Fechner; Gaumont Distribution
- Release date: 24 September 1986
- Running time: 87 minutes
- Country: France
- Language: French
- Box office: $10.4 million

Nuit d'ivresse (Night of drunkenness) is a 1986 French cult comedy film which was directed by Bernard Nauer and starring Josiane Balasko and Thierry Lhermitte. It was adapted from the play of the same name, created in 1985 by Balasko and Michel Blanc.

== Plot ==
Jacques Belin, a famous TV gameshow host, awaits his fiancée on New Year's Eve in the café of the Gare de l'Est in Paris. When she fails to show up, he meets a woman named Frède. She was recently released from prison, who is drinking while waiting for her morning train to Metz, where she is going to live with her sister. Complete opposites, Jacques and Frède's respective solitudes bring them together as they talk and drink. An eventful and unforgettable evening follows ...

== Cast ==
- Josiane Balasko as Frède
- Thierry Lhermitte as Jacques Belin
- Jean-Michel Dupuis as Steve
- Viviane Elbaz as Marlène
- Gérard Jugnot as himself
- Victoria Abril as Jugnot's wife
- Marc Dudicourt as President Bulot
- Daniel Dadzu as Auguste
- Alain Doutey as Jean-François Ragain
- Daniel Jégou as M.A. Ammou
- Sylvie Novak as Valérie Ammou
- France Roche as herself
- Ticky Holgado as France Roche's technician
- Bruno Moynot as France Roche's cameraman

== Play ==
- 1985–1988: with Josiane Balasko, Michel Blanc & Jean-François Dérec, directed by Josiane Balasko & Michel Blanc, Le Splendid
- 2002: with Michèle Bernier, Francis Huster, Pascal Légitimus, Christian Sinniger & Marilou Berry directed by Josiane Balasko, Théâtre de la Renaissance
- 2014–16: with Larra Mendy, Loïc Rojouan & Stéphane Caudéran, directed by Xavier Viton, Café-théâtre des Beaux-arts
- 2015–16: with Élisabeth Buffet, Denis Maréchal & Jean-Christophe Barc, directed by Dominique Guillo, Tour
- 2017: with Jean-Luc Reichmann
