= Roland Giraud =

French actor

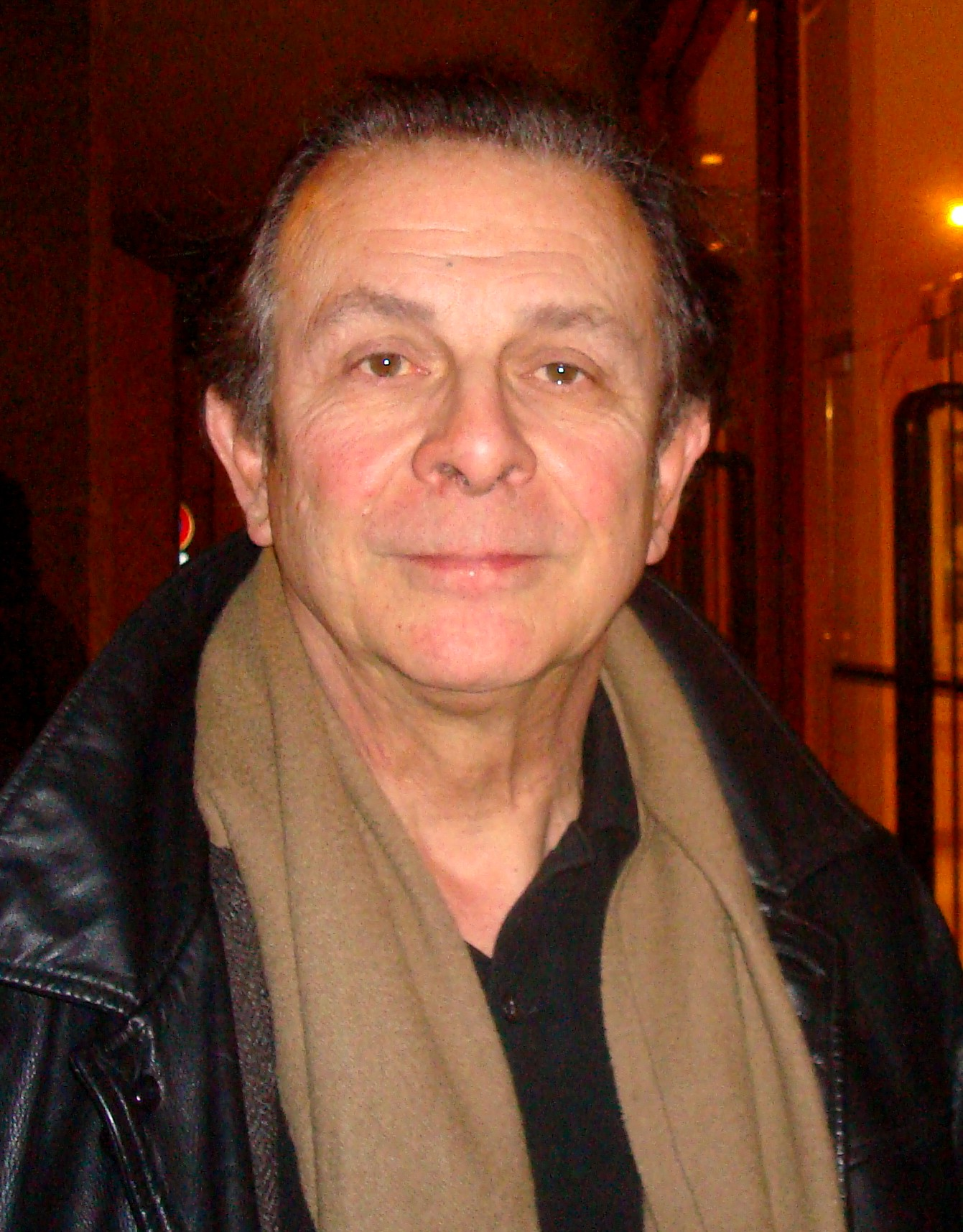
- Roland Giraud in 2010
- Occupation: Actor
- Years active: 1966–present

Roland Giraud is a French actor. He married actress Maaike Jansen in 1966.

Giraud began his theatrical training in the 1960s and joined Coluche's theatrical company in 1971. Around this time he worked also with the troupe, Le Splendid. His first cinematic role came in 1974 in Michel Audiard's Bons baisers...à lundi. He acquired greater recognition for Papy fait de la résistance, and again, for his appearance in Coline Serreau's Trois hommes et un couffin.

He lost his daughter Géraldine, an actress herself, murdered when she was just thirty-six, in Villeneuve-sur-Yonne.

== Selected filmography ==
- Heroes Are Not Wet Behind the Ears (1979)
- Clara et les Chics Types (1981)
- Signes extérieurs de richesse (1983)
- Gramps Is in the Resistance (1983)
- Three Men and a Cradle (1985)
- Tranches de vie (1985)
- Sans peur et sans reproche (1988)
- Les secrets professionnels du Dr Apfelglück (1991)
- A Mere Mortal (Simple mortel) — 1991
- Beur sur la ville (2011)
- The Gilded Cage (2013)
