= Jean-Marie Poiré =

French film director

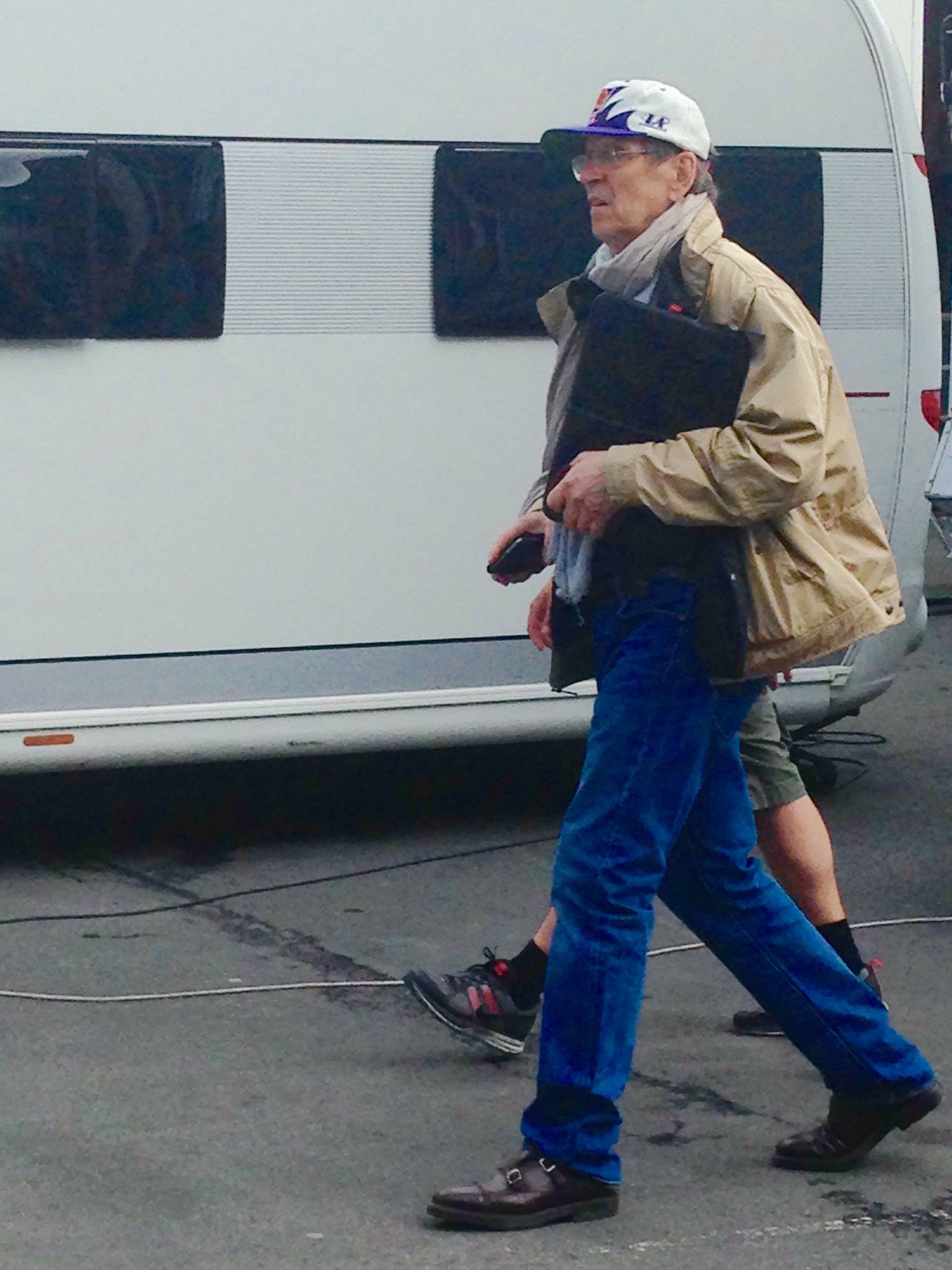
- Poiré on the set of The Visitors: Bastille Day in June 2015
- Born: 10 July 1945 (age 81); Paris, France
- Other name: Jean-Marie Gaubert
- Occupations: Film director, screenwriter

Jean-Marie Poiré (French pronunciation: [ʒɑ̃ maʁi pwaʁe]; born 10 July 1945), also credited as Jean-Marie Gaubert, is a French film director, and screenwriter. He is the son of the producer Alain Poiré.

== Filmography ==
=== As director ===
- Les petits câlins (The Little Wheedlers) (1978)
- Retour en force (Return in Bond) (1980)
- Les Hommes préfèrent les grosses (Men Prefer Fat Girls) (1981)
- Le Père Noël est une ordure (1982)
- Papy fait de la résistance (1983)
- Twist again à Moscou (Twist Again in Moscow) (1986)
- Mes meilleurs copains (1989)
- L'Opération Corned-Beef (1991)
- Les Visiteurs (The Visitors) (1993)
- Les Anges gardiens (Guardian Angels) (1995)
- Les Visiteurs II: Les Couloirs du temps (The Visitors II: The Corridors of Time) (1998)
- Just Visiting (2001) (as Jean-Marie Gaubert)
- Ma femme... s'appelle Maurice (My Wife Maurice aka My Wife's Name Is Maurice) (2002)
- The Visitors: Bastille Day (2016)

=== As screenwriter ===
- Leontine (1968)
- A Golden Widow (1969)
- Le Cri du cormoran le soir au-dessus des jonques (1971)
- Monsieur Papa (1977)
