= Patrice Leconte =

French film director, comic strip writer and screenwriter

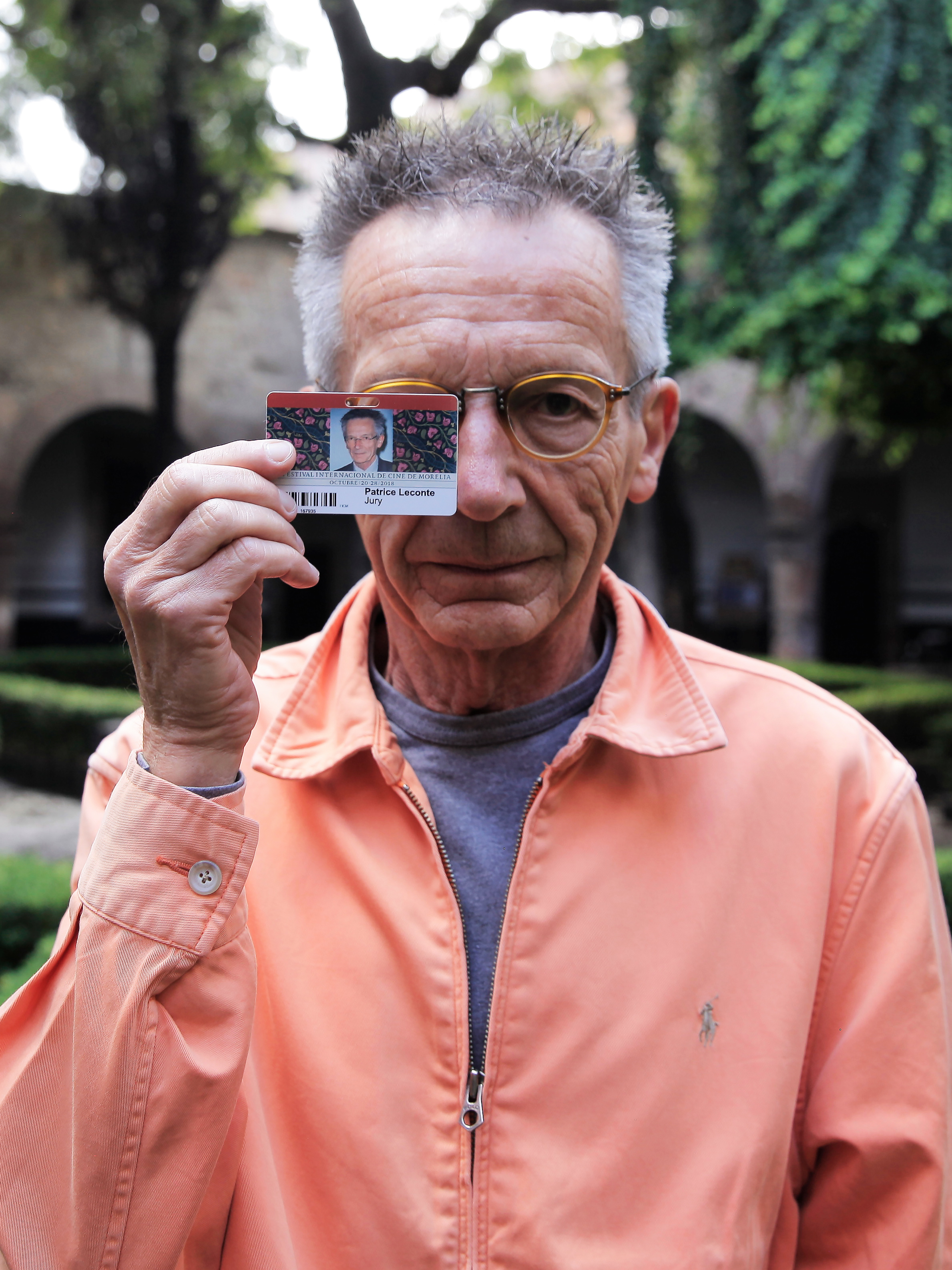
- Patrice Leconte in 2018
- Born: 12 November 1947 (age 78); Paris, France
- Occupations: Film director, screenwriter, comic strip writer
- Years active: 1969–present

Patrice Leconte (French: [patʁis ləkɔ̃t]; born 12 November 1947) is a French film director, screenwriter and comic strip writer.

== Life and career ==
Leconte grew up in Tours, and began making little amateur films at 15. He went to Paris in 1967 and studied at Institut des hautes études cinématographiques. While attending film school in the late 1960s, Leconte also worked as a cartoonist, in particular for comics magazine Pilote. In 1976, Leconte directed his first feature film, Les vécés étaient fermés de l'intérieur, a parody of crime films, scripted by Pilote author Gotlib and starring Jean Rochefort and Coluche. The film was a commercial failure.

In 1978, Leconte found success by directing the comedy troupe of Le Splendid in French Fried Vacation (Les Bronzés) based on one of their own plays. The film was a major commercial hit in France. Leconte then directed the sequel, French Fried Vacation 2, followed by three other successful comedies. Leconte remained associated with Le Splendid by working with troupe member Michel Blanc, who starred in his films and co-wrote the scripts with him. In 1985, Leconte changed register and directed the action film Les Spécialistes, which was another box-office hit.

In 1987, Leconte changed tone again by directing and writing with Patrick Dewolf the melancholic comedy drama Tandem, starring Jean Rochefort and an actor from Le Splendid troupe, Gérard Jugnot, who played his first serious role. In 1989, in a more radical departure from his previous work, he again directed a Le Splendid actor, this time Michel Blanc, in a dramatic role, in the crime drama Monsieur Hire. The latter film was shown at the 1989 Cannes Film Festival and helped Leconte gain international attention Although he had already directed more than half a dozen features, many foreign critics, unfamiliar with his previous work, essentially treated him as a newcomer. Since then, he has alternated between films such as Ridicule and L'homme du train which have had success in the international arthouse market, and others, like Les Grands Ducs, destined to the French mainstream market.

In the 2000s, Patrice Leconte received more recognition in the United States with the successful United States releases of Girl on the Bridge, The Widow of Saint-Pierre, Man on the Train and Intimate Strangers (Paramount Classics released three of these films in the United States). Ryan Mottesheard of IndieWIRE wrote: "you could even argue that no other foreign filmmaker (INCLUDING Pedro Almodóvar) has had as strong of an impact on United States arthouses."

An English language remake of Leconte's film Man on the Train was remade by an independent Hollywood studio in 2011, and two others are in 'development': Intimate Strangers and My Best Friend. In 2006, he directed French Fried Vacation 3, with the former members of Le Splendid troupe reprising their roles 27 years after the first sequel. The film was another box-office success in France.

Patrice Leconte's film, The Suicide Shop, was screened at the Newport Beach Film Festival in Newport Beach, California, on 28 April and 2 May 2013. Also in 2013, he directed his first English-language film, A Promise.

== Filmography ==
Short film

Year	Title	Notes
1969	L'Espace vital	
1971	Le Laboratoire de l'angoisse	
1973	La Famille heureuse (Famille Gazul)	
1991	Pour Alexandre Goldovitch, URSS	Segment of Contre l'oubli
1992	Le batteur du Boléro	
2007	Trac	
2007	Dix films pour en parler	

Feature film

Year	Title	Director	Writer
1976	Les vécés étaient fermés de l'intérieur	Yes	Yes
1978	French Fried Vacation	Yes	Yes
1979	French Fried Vacation 2	Yes	No
1981	Viens chez moi, j'habite chez une copine	Yes	No
1982	Ma femme s'appelle reviens	Yes	No
1983	Circulez y a rien à voir !	Yes	Yes
1985	Les Spécialistes	Yes	Yes
1987	Tandem	Yes	Yes
1989	Monsieur Hire	Yes	Yes
1990	The Hairdresser's Husband	Yes	Yes
1993	Tango	Yes	Yes
1994	Le Parfum d'Yvonne	Yes	Yes
1996	Les Grands Ducs	Yes	Yes
1996	Ridicule	Yes	No
1998	Une chance sur deux	Yes	Yes
1999	Girl on the Bridge	Yes	No
2000	The Widow of Saint-Pierre	Yes	Yes
2001	Félix et Lola	Yes	Yes
2002	Rue des Plaisirs	Yes	Yes
2002	The Man on the Train	Yes	No
2004	Intimate Strangers	Yes	Yes
2006	French Fried Vacation 3	Yes	No
2006	My Best Friend	Yes	Yes
2008	Beauties at War	Yes	No
2011	Voir la mer	Yes	Yes
2012	The Suicide Shop	Yes	Yes
2013	A Promise	Yes	Yes
2014	Do Not Disturb	Yes	No
2022	Maigret	Yes	Yes

Documentary film

Year	Title	Notes
1993	The King of Ads	Segment "Pilote commercial"
1995	Lumière and Company	Segment "La Ciotat 1996"
2004	Dogora: Ouvrons les yeux	

Television

Year	Title	Notes
1988	Sueurs froides	1 Episode

== Box-office ==
Year	Title	Performance	Ref.
1976	Les vécés étaient fermés de l'intérieur	$3,483,367	
1978	French Fried Vacation	$17,314,830	
1979	French Fried Vacation 2	$11,518,357	
1981	Viens chez moi, j'habite chez une copine	$21,151,267	
1982	Ma femme s'appelle reviens	$8,916,300	
1983	Circulez y a rien à voir !	$8,133,292	
1985	Les Spécialistes	$39,896,565	
1987	Tandem	$4,483,185	
1989	Monsieur Hire	$5,980,540	
1990	The Hairdresser's Husband	$2,687,602	
1993	Tango	$4,798,440	
1994	Le Parfum d'Yvonne	$1,191,270	
1996	Les Grands Ducs	$3,755,175	
1996	Ridicule	$35,519,611	
1998	Une chance sur deux	$7,926,075	
1999	Girl on the Bridge	$11,171,846	
2000	The Widow of Saint-Pierre	$12,990,288	
2001	Félix et Lola	$480,382	
2002	Rue des Plaisirs	$1,873,072	
2002	The Man on the Train	$7,582,447	
2004	Intimate Strangers	$7,460,079	
2006	French Fried Vacation 3	$83,897,719	
2006	My Best Friend	$13,186,926	
2008	Beauties at War	$3,016,611	
2011	Voir la mer	$248,092	
2012	The Suicide Shop	$2,229,885	
2013	A Promise	$385,486	
2014	Do Not Disturb	$7,551,502	
2022	Maigret	$4,420,841	

== Awards and nominations ==
Year	Title	Notes
1981	Viens chez moi, j'habite chez une copine	Nominated – Chicago International Film Festival – Best Feature
1987	Tandem	Nominated – César Award for Best Film; Nominated – César Award for Best Director; Nominated – César Award for Best Original Screenplay or Adaptation
1989	Monsieur Hire	Boston Society of Film Critics Award for Best Foreign Language Film; French Syndicate of Cinema Critics – Prix Méliès – Best French Film; Guldbagge Award – Best Foreign Film; National Board of Review Award for Top Foreign Films; Nominated – Cannes Film Festival – Palme d'Or; Nominated – César Award for Best Film; Nominated – César Award for Best Director
1992	Le batteur du Boléro	Kraków Film Festival – Don Quixote Award
1990	The Hairdresser's Husband	Louis Delluc Prize; Nominated – BAFTA Award for Best Film not in the English Language; Nominated – César Award for Best Film; Nominated – César Award for Best Director; Nominated – César Award for Best Original Screenplay or Adaptation
1996	Ridicule	BAFTA Award for Best Film not in the English Language; Critics' Choice Movie Award for Best Foreign Language Film; Chicago International Film Festival – Best Film; César Award for Best Film; César Award for Best Director; David di Donatello for Best Foreign Film; Florida Film Critics Circle Award for Best Foreign Language Film; London Film Critics' Circle Award for Foreign Language Film of the Year; Lumière Award for Best Film; National Board of Review Award for Best Foreign Language Film; San Diego Film Critics Society Award for Best Foreign Language Film; Society of Texas Film Critics Award – Best Foreign Film; Awards Circuit Community Awards – Best Foreign Language Film; Kansas City Film Critics Circle Awards – Best Foreign Film; Online Film & Television Association – Best Foreign Language Film; Nominated – Academy Award for Best Foreign Language Film; Nominated – Golden Globe Award for Best Foreign Language Film; Nominated – Boston Society of Film Critics Award for Best Foreign Language Film; Nominated – Cannes Film Festival – Palme d'Or; Nominated – Chicago Film Critics Association Award for Best Foreign Language Film; Nominated – Satellite Award for Best Foreign Language Film
1999	Girl on the Bridge	Cinemania Film Festival – Audience Award; Karlovy Vary International Film Festival – Don Quijote Award – Special Mention; Las Vegas Film Critics Society Awards – Best Foreign Film; Nominated – Golden Globe Award for Best Foreign Language Film; Nominated – BAFTA Award for Best Film not in the English Language; Nominated – Chicago Film Critics Association Award for Best Foreign Language Film; Nominated – César Award for Best Director; Nominated – César Award for Best Film; Nominated – Dallas–Fort Worth Film Critics Association Award for Best Foreign Language Film; Nominated – Karlovy Vary International Film Festival – Crystal Globe; Nominated – Los Angeles Film Critics Association Award for Best Foreign Language Film; National Board of Review Award for Top Foreign Films; Nominated – Online Film Critics Society Award for Best Foreign Language Film; Nominated – Phoenix Film Critics Society Awards – Best Foreign Language Film; Nominated – Robert Festival – Best Non-American Film
2000	The Widow of Saint-Pierre	Moscow International Film Festival – Russian Film Critics Award; Nominated – Golden Globe Award for Best Foreign Language Film; Nominated – American Film Institute – Grand Jury Prize; Nominated – Film Critics Circle of Australia – Best Foreign-Language Film; Nominated – Moscow International Film Festival – Golden St. George
2001	Félix et Lola	Nominated – Berlin International Film Festival – Golden Bear; Nominated – Verona Love Screens Film Festival – Best Film
2002	The Man on the Train	Florida Film Critics Circle Award for Best Foreign Language Film; Los Angeles Film Critics Association Award for Best Foreign Language Film; National Board of Review Award for Top Foreign Films; Venice Film Festival – Audience Award – Best Film; Seattle Film Critics Awards – Best Foreign-Language Film; Nominated – David di Donatello for Best Foreign Film; Nominated – European Film Academy People's Choice Award for Best European Film; Nominated – Venice Film Festival – Golden Lion; Nominated – Central Ohio Film Critics Association – Best Foreign-Language Film; Nominated – Online Film & Television Association – Best Foreign Language Film; Nominated – Phoenix Film Critics Society Awards – Best Foreign Language Film
2004	Intimate Strangers	Nominated – Berlin International Film Festival – Golden Bear; Nominated – European Film Academy People's Choice Award for Best European Film; Nominated – Tallinn Black Nights Film Festival – Grand Prize
2006	My Best Friend	Nominated – David di Donatello for Best European Film
2011	Voir la mer	Nominated – Taormina International Film Festival – Golden Tauro
2012	The Suicide Shop	Nominated – European Film Academy Young Audience Award
2013	A Promise	Nominated – Magritte Award for Best Foreign Film in Coproduction

== Notes ==
- Lisa Downing, Patrice Leconte (Manchester: Manchester University Press, 2004)
