= Yaël Boon =

French-Swiss actress and film producer

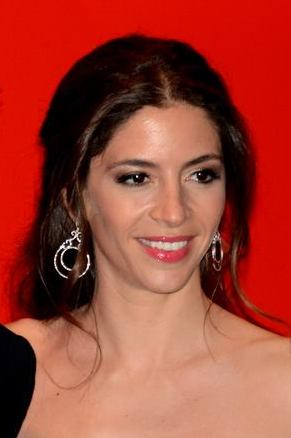
- Boon in 2015
- Born: Paris, France
- Occupations: actress; director; Film producer; writer
- Spouse: Dany Boon (2003-2018)

Yaël Boon (née Harris) is a French–Swiss actress, director, film producer and screenwriter. Boon has appeared in several notable French language films including Welcome to the Sticks (2008) and Supercondriaque (2014). She has also worked on the production side of film; in 2010, she was a writer for Nothing to Declare and in 2016 produced Ma famille t'adore déjà.

== Personal life ==
She is multilingual and speaks five languages: French, English, German, Spanish, and Hebrew.

In 2003, she married French comedian Dany Boon, who converted to Judaism (her faith). The couple has three children: Eytan, Elia, and Sarah. They separated in 2018. She is of Portuguese descent and her children hold Portuguese passports.

== Filmography ==
=== Film ===
Year	Film	Role				Notes
Year	Film	Actress	Director	Producer	Writer	Notes
2008	Welcome to the Sticks	Yes	—	—	—	
2010	Nothing to Declare	—	—	—	Yes	
2014	Supercondriaque	Yes	—	—	—	
2016	Ma famille t'adore déjà	—	—	Yes	—	

=== Television ===
Year	Series	Role	Notes
2004	Music-hall et compagnie	Herself	
2006, 2008	Qui veut gagner des millions ?	Herself	Two episodes
2008	Le Grand Journal	Herself	One episode
2014	Signé Mireille Dumas	Herself	One episode
