= Valérie Bonneton =

French actress (born 1970)

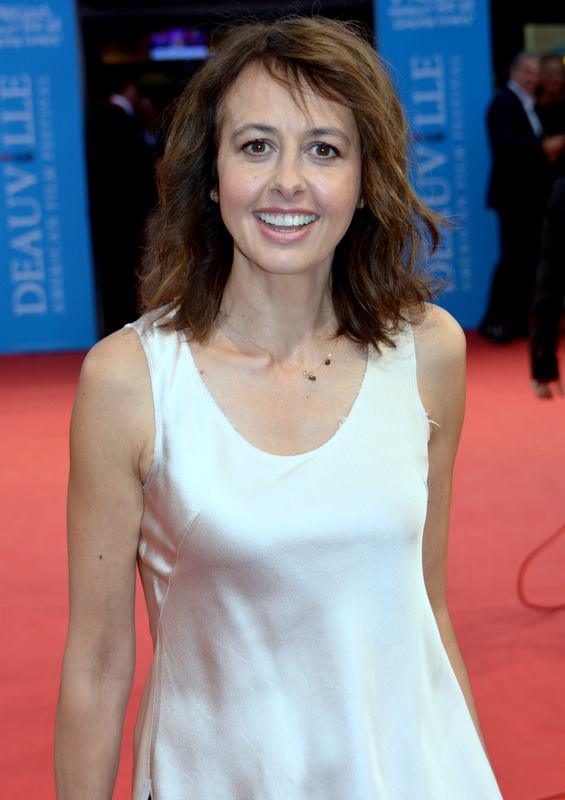
- Bonneton in 2014
- Born: 5 April 1970 (age 54); Somain, Nord, France
- Occupation: Actress
- Years active: 1995–present
- Children: 2

Valérie Bonneton (born 5 April 1970) is a French actress.

== Life and career ==
Bonneton was born in Somain, Nord department. Her father was an insurance salesman and her mother a housewife. She grew up in neighbouring Aniche and fell in love with acting in her cinquième (~Year 7) French class. Considering an acting career too difficult, she entered the science stream for her baccalauréat, intending to become a veterinarian. But playing the role of Ismène in Anouilh's Antigone changed her mind. After her baccalauréat she left for Paris where she enrolled at Cours Florent, supporting herself with part-time jobs (fruit seller, baby-sitter, sculptor's model). In 1991, she was accepted into the National Academy of Dramatic Arts where she studied until the age of 26.

== Career ==
She took noteworthy supporting roles in films, until the success of the television series Fais pas ci, fais pas ça in 2007, which made her popular. In 2010, she appeared in Guillaume Canet's Little White Lies which earned her a César Awards nomination as Best Supporting Actress. In 2013, she appeared in Eyjafjallajökull with Dany Boon. In 2017, she acted in Garde alternée with Didier Bourdon and Isabelle Carré.

== Personal life ==
Bonneton has two children from a relationship with actor François Cluzet.

== Filmography ==
=== Feature films ===
Year	Title	Role	Director	Notes
1996	Love, etc.	The florist	Marion Vernoux	
1998	La voie est libre	Brigitte	Stephane Clavier	
1998	Grève party		Fabien Onteniente	
1998	The Perfect Guy	Sophie	Olivier Ducastel	
1998	La Mort du Chinois	Flo	Jean-Louis Benoît	
1998	Mookie	Nun Rose	Hervé Palud	
1999	L'Homme de ma vie	Myriam	Stéphane Kurc	
2000	Sentimental Destinies	Arthur Pommerel's wife	Olivier Assayas	
2001	Voyance et Manigance	Agnès	Éric Fourniols	
2003	Le Bison (et sa voisine Dorine)	Reine	Isabelle Nanty	
2003	Janis et John	Woman on the bus	Samuel Benchetrit	
2003	France Boutique	Norma	Tonie Marshall	
2004	Les gens honnêtes vivent en France	Chloé	Bob Decout	
2005	La cloche a sonné	Nathalie	Bruno Herbulot	
2005	Je vous trouve très beau	Lawyer Labaume	Isabelle Mergault	
2006	Essaye-moi	Jacqueline's colleague	Pierre-François Martin-Laval	
2006	La Jungle	Natacha	Matthieu Delaporte	
2006	L'École pour tous	Pashmina	Éric Rochant	
2008	Summer Hours	Angela Marly	Olivier Assayas	
2008	Bouquet final	Marie Thanato	Michel Delgado	
2010	Little White Lies	Véronique Cantara	Guillaume Canet	
2011	Propriété interdite	Claire	Hélène Angel	
2011	Qui a envie d'être aimé ?	Hortense	Anne Giafferi	
2011	Goodbye First Love	Camille's mother	Mia Hansen-Løve	
2011	Le Skylab	Aunt Micheline	Julie Delpy	
2012	L'Oncle Charles	Corinne	Étienne Chatiliez	
2013	Des gens qui s'embrassent	Irène	Danièle Thompson	
2013	Eyjafjallajökull	Valérie	Alexandre Coffre	
2014	Jacky in Women's Kingdom	The sheriff	Riad Sattouf	
2014	À coup sûr	Béné Dorian	Delphine de Vigan	
2014	Supercondriaque	Isabelle	Dany Boon	
2014	Do Not Disturb	Elsa	Patrice Leconte	
2015	The Night Watchman	Mylène	Pierre Jolivet	
2015	The Roommates Party	Béatrice Bretzel	Alexandra Leclère	
2016	The Jews	Eva	Yvan Attal	
2017	Garde alternée	Marie	Alexandra Leclère	
2018	La Ch'tite famille	Louloute	Dany Boon	
2019	Little White Lies 2	Véronique	Guillaume Canet	
2021	Eugénie Grandet	Madame Grandet	Marc Dugain	

=== Television ===
Year	Title	Role	Director	Notes
1995	Les Zacros de la télé		Dany Boon	TV series
1996	Viens jouer dans la cour des grands	Patricia	Caroline Huppert	TV movie
1998	Le Feu sous la glace	Eve	Françoise Decaux-Thomelet	TV movie
1999	Chasseurs d'écume	Marie-Annick	Denys Granier-Deferre	TV series
2002	Caméra Café	The lingerie demonstrator		TV series
2002	La Famille Guérin	Caroline Guérin		TV series
2005	Vénus et Apollon			TV series – Season 1 Episode 25
2007	Chez Maupassant	Rosalie	Gérard Jourd'hui	
2007–2017	Fais pas ci, fais pas ça	Fabienne Lepic	Anne Giafferi & Thierry Bizot	TV series
2011	Héloïse et Le Romancier Martin	Marie-Thérèse	Jérôme Foulon	TV movie
2022	Irma Vep	French PR	Olivier Assayas	TV miniseries

== Awards and nominations ==
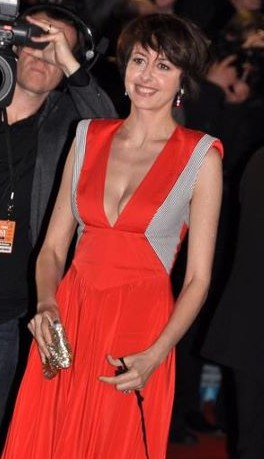
Valérie Bonneton at the 37th César Awards

Award	Year	Nominated work	Category	Result
Molière Awards	2008	God of Carnage	Best Supporting Actress	Won
Golden Nymph Awards	2009	Fais pas ci, fais pas ça	Best Actress in a TV Series – Comedy	Won
César Awards	2011	Little White Lies	Best Supporting Actress	Nominated
ACS Awards	2015	Fais pas ci, fais pas ça	Best Actress	Nominated
ACS Awards	2016	Fais pas ci, fais pas ça	Best Actress	Nominated
Chevalier of the Order of Arts and Letters	2016	—	—	Won
