= Jérôme Commandeur =

French actor and director

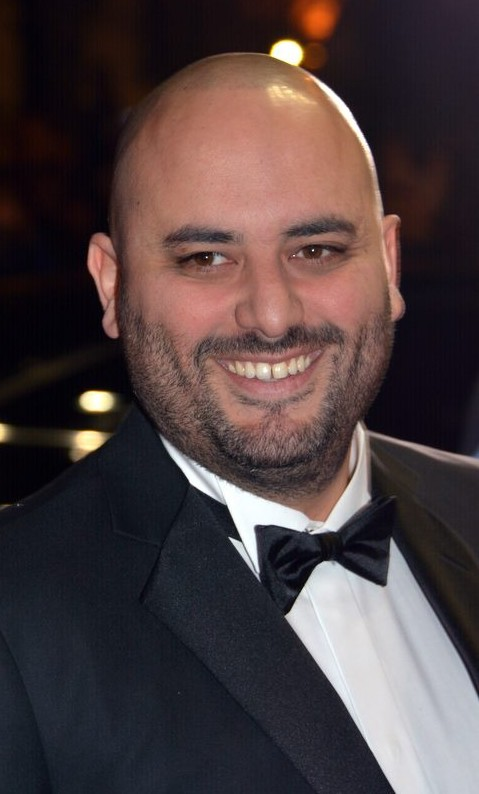
- Jérôme Commandeur at the 2016 César Awards
- Born: 12 April 1976 (age 50); Argenteuil, Val-d'Oise, France
- Years active: 2008–present

Jérôme Commandeur (born 12 April 1976) is a French comedian, actor and director.

== Early life and education ==
Jérôme Commandeur was born in Argenteuil and grew up in Poissy.

He attended the Lycée International de Saint-Germain-en-Laye. He started a degree at the Sorbonne University, but dropped out. He was mentored by the actor and director Dany Boon.

== Filmography ==
Year	Title	Role	Director	Notes
2008	Welcome to the Sticks	Inspector Lebic	Dany Boon	
2011	Les Tuche	Hermann	Olivier Baroux	
2011	Nothing to Declare	French Driver	Dany Boon	
2011	Hollywoo	Bob	Frédéric Berthe & Pascal Serieis	
2011	Au bistro du coin	The Fireman	Charles Nemes	
2011	De l'huile sur le feu	The Cop	Nicolas Benamou	
2011	Il faut qu'on parle...	Adam	Raphaël Kenzey	Short
2013	Vive la France	The Cop	Michaël Youn	
2013	The Stroller Strategy	Paul Bordinot	Clément Michel	
2013	Turf	Jean Bruno	Fabien Onteniente	
2013	Y'a pas d'âge	Simon	Stéphane Marelli, Vincent Puybaret, ...	TV series (29 episodes)
2014	Barbecue	Jean-Mich'	Éric Lavaine	
2014	Supercondriaque	Guillaume Lempreur	Dany Boon	
2015	Babysitting 2	Michel Massieye	Philippe Lacheau & Nicolas Benamou	
2016	Back to Mom's	Alain Bordier	Éric Lavaine	
2016	Ma famille t'adore déjà	Jean-Seb	Jérôme Commandeur & Alan Corno	
2016	À fond	Danieli	Nicolas Benamou	
2017	The New Adventures of Cinderella	The Grand Duke	Lionel Steketee	
2017	L'embarras du choix	Philippe	Éric Lavaine	
2018	Gaston Lagaffe	De Mesmaeker	Pierre-François Martin-Laval	
2019	Toute ressemblance		Michel Denisot	
2021	Mystère à Saint-Tropez	Cyril, the cooking chef		
2022	Le Flambeau : Les Aventuriers de Chupacabra	Host	Jonathan Cohen	TV series (9 episodes)
2022	Irma Vep	Angus	Olivier Assayas	TV series (2 episodes)
2023	Asterix & Obelix: The Middle Kingdom	Vitalstatistix	Guillaume Canet	
2025	Asterix & Obelix: The Big Fight	Caesar's mother/ Blackangus (voice)	Alain Chabat	Miniseries

== Radio ==
- 2014-2016 : Les pieds dans le plat on Europe 1

== Television ==
- 2017 : Host of the 42nd César Awards
