= Alice Pol =

French actress (born 1982)

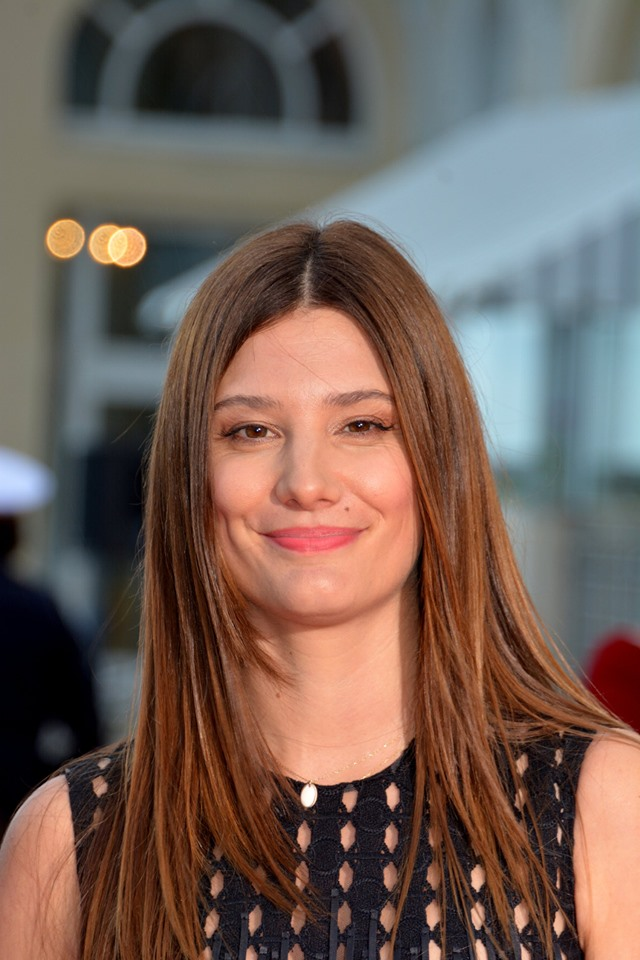
- Alice Pol in 2019
- Born: 3 December 1982 (age 43); Saint-Pierre, Réunion, France
- Occupation: Actress
- Years active: 2003–present

Alice Pol (born 3 December 1982) is a French actress. She is known for playing the role of Anna Zvenka in Supercondriaque.

== Filmography ==
Year	Title	Role	Director	Notes
2003	Fragile	Sophie	Jean-Louis Milesi	TV movie
2004	Plus belle la vie	Zoe	Christophe Andrei, Charli Beléteau	TV series (3 episodes)
2004	Julie Lescaut	Amélie	Bernard Uzan	TV series (1 episode)
2004	Ma terminale	Edith	Stéphane Meunier	TV series (25 episodes)
2005	Belle, enfin possible	Narrator	Régis Roinsard	Short
2008	Tutto o niente	Claire	Christophe Fustini	Short
2008	Sous le soleil	Chloé	William Gotesman	TV series (1 episode)
2008	Vilaine	Jessica	Jean-Patrick Benes, Allan Mauduit	
2008	Mafiosa	Aurélie	Éric Rochant	TV series (1 episode)
2009	Queen to Play	Natalia	Caroline Bottaro	
2009	Juste un peu d'@mour	Inès	Nicolas Herdt	TV movie
2010	À 10 minutes de la plage	Lupita	Stéphane Kappes	TV movie
2010	Trahie!	Laura	Charlotte Brandström	TV movie
2010	Le miroir	The mother	Sébastien Rossignol	Short
2010	Romantics Anonymous	Adèle	Jean-Pierre Améris	
2010	Domino(S)	Waitress	Charles Poupot	Short
2011	La loi selon Bartoli	Aline Juano	Charlotte Brandström & François Velle	TV series (1 episode)
2011	La croisière	Alix's collaborator	Pascale Pouzadoux	
2011	Une folle envie	The student	Bernard Jeanjean	
2012	Quitte ou double	Emilie	Alexandre Coffre	Short
2012	Merlin	The seller	Stéphane Kappes	TV Mini-Series (1 episode)
2012	Un plan parfait	Corinne	Pascal Chaumeil	
2013	Au bonheur des ogres	The psychiatrist	Nicolas Bary	
2013	Joséphine	Diane	Agnès Obadia	
2013	Il neige sur Acapulco	Magalie	Aurelien Drach	Short
2014	Supercondriaque	Anna Zvenka	Dany Boon	
2015	The Disappearance	Camille Guérin	Charlotte Brandström	TV series (8 episodes)
2015	Qui c'est les plus forts?	Sam	Charlotte de Turckheim	
2015	Un plus une	Alice Hanel	Claude Lelouch	
2016	Cézanne and I	Alexandrine Zola	Danièle Thompson	
2017	Raid dingue	Johanna Pasquali	Dany Boon	
2018	I Feel Better	Pauline	Jean-Pierre Améris	
2018	Tricky Old Dogs	Sophie / Lucette	Christophe Duthuron	
2019	Calls	Marie		TV series (1 episode)
2019	Le Dindon	Victoire Vatelin	Jalil Lespert	
2020	The Fantastic Journey of Margot & Marguerite (L'Aventure des Marguerite)	Aunt Alice	Pierre Coré	
2020	J'irai mourir dans les Carpates	Agnès	Antoine de Maximy	
2020	C'est la vie	Sophie	Julien Rambaldi	
2021	C'est magnifique	Anna Lorenzi	Clovis Cornillac	
2022	Murder Party	Jeanne Chardon-Spitzer	Nicolas Pleskof	
