= Judi Beecher =

American actress

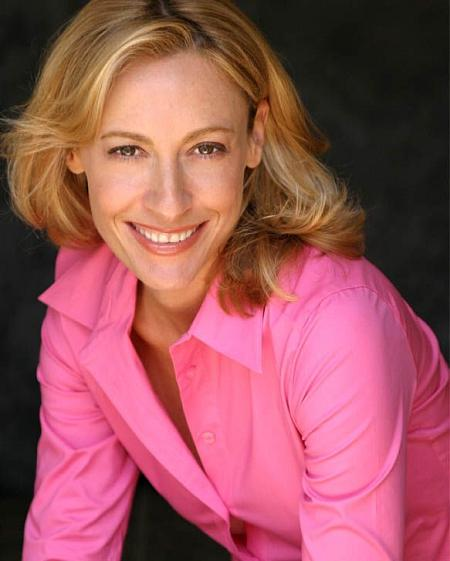
- Occupations: Actress, Voice Actress, Director, Producer, Singer-Songwriter

Judi Beecher is an American actress, voice actress and filmmaker who is best known for providing the voice and facial motion capture of Madison Paige in the video game Heavy Rain.

== Acting career ==
Beecher's first professional acting job was with Woody Allen in a string of commercials for Coop Italia. In her early years she was a chanteuse singing next to the Gipsy Kings in Avignon France and busked her way across the South of France to Spain. She is tri-lingual English, Italian French, Italian and conversational Spanish.

Beecher is best known for Tango Shalom (2021) where she won Best Acting Duo at the Sydney International Film Festival for the role of Raquel Yehuda, the wife of a Hassidic Rabbi, La Garçonne (2020) the French television series, she plays series regular Jenny Meyers, whose producers are also known for Call My Agent, Taken 3 (2014), Dany Boon's, La Ch'tite Famille (Family is Family) (2018), and Only in Paris (2009) in which she won the Best Actress award for her performance of Samantha Tomelson.

== Acting filmography ==
=== Film ===
Year	Title	Role	Notes
1995	Gentleman's Bet	Maxine	
1998	Armageddon	Presidential cabinet member	
2000	Yup Yup Man	Diana	
2001	The Gift	Sati	
2004	The Stepford Wives	Stepford wife	
2006	Four Weeks, Four Hours	Alexis	
2009	Bundy: A Legacy of Evil	Campaign staffer #3	
2009	The Idiot Cycle	TV anchor	
2011	Cameraman	Kate	
2012	Tragedy of a Mother and Son	Police Officer Jen	
2012	Summer in Provence	Barbra	
2013	The Warrior and the Savior	Pauline Pierson	
2014	Yves Saint Laurent	Journaliste américaine	
2014	A Cry from Within	Young Sophia	
2014	Taken 3	Claire	
2016	Larchmont	Francine Leblanc	
2018	Family is Family	Kate Fischer	
2021	Tango Shalom	Raquel Yehuda	
2021	Super Heroes: The Movie	Linda	
2022	The Lies We Tell Ourselves	Sarah	
2025	The Scar That Scares Me	Maggie	
2025	Nonnas	Additional Voices	
2025	Maintenance Required	Karen	
2026	Simultané	Beth	

=== Television ===
Year	Title	Role	Notes
1997	The Bold and the Beautiful	Flight attendant	Episode #1.2560
2000	JAG	Salesgirl	Episode: "Family Secrets"
2002	Once and Again	Saleswoman	Episode: "Gardenia"
2002	The Shield	Admin. Assistant	Episode: "Blowback"
2003	Law & Order	Lisa Vitello	Episode: "Patient Zero"
2020	La Garçonne	Jenny Meyer	5 episodes
2022	ITV Celebrities Interview	Judi Beecher	1 Episode
2025	La Live with Ron Cobert	Judi Beecher	Episode: 1.3

=== Video Games ===
Year	Title	Role	Notes
2010	Heavy Rain	Madison Paige	Video Game
