= Ma famille t'adore déjà =

- Directed by: Jérôme Commandeur; Alan Corno
- Written by: Jérôme Commandeur; Frédéric Jurie; Kevin Knepper
- Produced by: Dany Boon; Yaël Boon; Eric Hubert; Laurent Storch; Jonathan Blumenthal; Romain Le Grand; Patrick Quinet
- Starring: Arthur Dupont; Déborah François; Thierry Lhermitte; Marie-Anne Chazel; Jérôme Commandeur; Valérie Karsenti; Sabine Azéma
- Music by: Maxime Desprez; Michaël Tordjman
- Production companies: Pathé; TF1 Films Production; HBB26; Les Productions du Ch'timi; Artémis Productions; Shelter Prod
- Distributed by: Pathé
- Release date: 9 November 2016
- Running time: 85 minutes
- Countries: France; Belgium
- Language: French
- Budget: $8.6 million
- Box office: $4 million

Ma famille t'adore déjà is a 2016 French comedy film directed by Jérôme Commandeur and Alan Corno.

== Plot ==
Julien, creator of mobile applications, falls in love with Eva, a young journalist. She introduces him to her parents. All together find themselves on a weekend that will be memorable for each of them.

== Cast ==
- Arthur Dupont as Julien
- Déborah François as Eva
- Thierry Lhermitte as Jean
- Marie-Anne Chazel as Marie-Laure
- Jérôme Commandeur as Jean-Seb
- Valérie Karsenti as Corinne
- Sabine Azéma as Dahlia
- Alicia Endemann as Anneke
- Catherine Benguigui as Gisèle
- Éric Berger as Lambert
- Marie Borowski as Anouck
- Jean-Yves Chatelais as Roland
- Raphaël Aouizerate as Palefroi
- Samuel Aouizerate as Jean-Jésus
- [Catherine Gautier as Elliane
- Hélène Aprea as Lulu
- Fabienne Galula as Marie-Annick
- Valérie Vogt as The turnkey
