= La Ch'tite famille =

- Directed by: Dany Boon
- Screenplay by: Dany Boon; Sarah Kaminsky
- Produced by: Jerome Seydoux
- Starring: Dany Boon; Line Renaud; Laurence Arne; Valerie Bonneton; Guy Lecluyse
- Cinematography: Denis Rouden
- Edited by: Elodie Codaccioni
- Music by: Michael Tordjman; Maxime Despres
- Production companies: Pathé; Les Productions du Ch'timi; TF1 Films Productions; Solidaris; 26DB Productions
- Distributed by: Pathé
- Release dates: 13 January 2018 (Colmar premiere); 28 February 2018 (France)
- Running time: 106 minutes
- Country: France
- Languages: French; Picard
- Budget: $31.4 million
- Box office: $49.8 million

La Ch'tite famille is a 2018 French film directed and starring Dany Boon.

== Cast ==
- Dany Boon : Valentin Duquenne
- Line Renaud : Mother Duquenne
- Laurence Arné : Constance Brandt
- Valérie Bonneton : Louloute
- Guy Lecluyse : Gustave
- François Berléand : Alexander
- Pierre Richard : Jacques Duquenne
- Juliane Lepoureau : Britney
- Judi Beecher : Kate Fischer
- Claudia Tagbo : Minister of Culture
- Kad Merad : Himself
- Julia Vignali : Herself
- Arthur : Himself
- Pascal Obispo : Himself
- Claire Chazal : Herself

== Production ==
Jordan Mintzer of The Hollywood Reporter stated that the film was not specifically a sequel to Boon's previous film Bienvenue chez les Ch'tis, but was "closer to a spinoff project". Boon stated that in 2014 he wrote a second draft of a follow-up to Bienvenue chez les Ch'tis but that he "wasn’t that happy with it, something was missing." While working on Raid dingue, Boon began re-developing La Ch'tite famille.

== Release ==
La Ch'tite famille was released in France on 28 February 2018. On its opening weekend in France, the film grossed $16,739,183 in France, debuted in first place at the French box office. The film grossed a total of $46,316,363 in France.

== Reception ==
Mintzer of The Hollywood Reporter stated that Boon "takes his concept as far as it can go and then some, nailing a few solid laughs along the way but running out of steam after the midway mark."
