= Philippe Rombi =

French film score composer (born 1968)

- Born: 3 April 1968 (age 58); Pau, Pyrénées-Atlantiques, France
- Occupation: Film composer

Philippe Rombi (born 3 April 1968) is a French film score composer. His score for Bienvenue chez les Ch'tis was nominated for best original score for a comedy film at the fifth International Film Music Critics Association (IFCMA) Awards for Excellence in 2008.

== Filmography ==
Year	Title	Director	Notes
1999	Criminal Lovers	François Ozon	
2000	Under the Sand	François Ozon	
2001	Yes, But...	Yves Lavandier	
2001	The Girl from Paris	Christian Carion	
2002	Une employée modèle	Jacques Otmezguine	
2003	Swimming Pool	François Ozon	
2003	The Cost of Living	Philippe Le Guay	
2003	Love Me If You Dare	Yann Samuell	
2004	Look at Me	Agnès Jaoui	
2004	The Role of Her Life	François Favrat	
2004	5x2	François Ozon	
2004	The Story of My Life	Laurent Tirard	
2005	Joyeux Noël	Christian Carion	Nominated—César Award for Best Music Written for a Film
2006	Du jour au lendemain	Philippe Le Guay	
2006	La Maison du Bonheur	Dany Boon	
2007	Angel	François Ozon	
2008	Welcome to the Sticks	Dany Boon	
2008	The Girl from Monaco	Anne Fontaine	
2008	A Man and His Dog	Francis Huster	
2009	Ricky	François Ozon	
2010	Potiche	François Ozon	
2010	Nothing to Declare	Dany Boon	
2011	War of the Buttons	Christophe Barratier	
2011	Hollywoo	Frédéric Berthe; Pascal Serieis	
2012	In the House	François Ozon	Nominated—César Award for Best Music Written for a Film
2013	Young & Beautiful	François Ozon	
2014	The New Girlfriend	François Ozon	
2014	Asterix: The Mansions of the Gods	Alexandre Astier; Louis Clichy	
2015	One Wild Moment	Jean-François Richet	
2015	The Roommates Party	Alexandra Leclère	
2016	Team Spirit	Christophe Barratier	
2016	Frantz	François Ozon	
2017	L'Amant double	François Ozon	
2017	L'Un dans l'autre	Bruno Chiche	
2018	Asterix: The Secret of the Magic Potion	Alexandre Astier; Louis Clichy	
2021	Black Box	Yann Gozlan	
2021	Fly Me Away	Christophe Barratier	
2021	Mes très chers enfants	Alexandra Leclère	
2022	Le Temps des secrets	Christophe Barratier	
2022	Driving Madeleine	Christian Carion	
2023	The Crime Is Mine	François Ozon	
2023	Visions	Yann Gozlan	
