= La Maison du Bonheur =

- Film poster
- Directed by: Dany Boon
- Written by: Dany Boon
- Produced by: Claude Berri
- Starring: Dany Boon; Michèle Laroque; Daniel Prévost
- Cinematography: Jean-Marie Dreujou
- Edited by: Luc Barnie
- Music by: Philippe Rombi
- Production companies: Pathé Renn Productions; Hirsch; TF1 Films Production; Les Productions du Ch'timi
- Distributed by: Pathé Distribution
- Release date: 7 June 2006
- Running time: 103 minutes
- Country: France
- Language: French
- Budget: $10.5 million
- Box office: $7.3 million

La Maison du Bonheur (The House of Happiness) is a 2006 French comedy film directed by Dany Boon, adapted from the play La Vie de chantier (Life on a building site).

== Plot ==
Charles Boulin is a debt collector for a credit company called Crédilem.

After his wife Anne accuses him of being tight-fisted, he decides to surprise her by buying a house in the country... but before he manages to do so the house is snatched up by one of his colleagues. In his disappointment he steals his colleague's bag which contains the signed deeds. As he has already been given several warnings at work, he is sacked on the spot.

To reduce renovation costs, Charles Boulin seeks the help of Jean-Pierre Draquart, the shifty estate agent who sold him the second house in his catalogue. This swindler calls up his "best team": Mouloud Mami and Donatello Pirelli - who as workers are both perfectly incompetent. As the renovation progresses, the house gradually turns into ruins.

Charles soon finds himself in debt after being refused a bank loan and then has to sell the family apartment without letting his wife or daughter find out. He survives on odd jobs, whilst scheming in order to convince his family to move into the "new" house...

== Cast ==
- Dany Boon as Charles Boulin
- Michèle Laroque as Anne Boulin
- Daniel Prévost as Jean-Pierre Draquart
- Zinedine Soualem as Mouloud Mami
- Laurent Gamelon as Donatello Pirelli
- Line Renaud as Aunt Suzanne Bailleul
- Michel Vuillermoz as Jacques Kurtz
- Ariane Séguillon as Nicole Kurtz
- Gaëlle Bona as Élisabeth
- Antoine Chappey as Alexis Boulin
- Laure Sirieix as Norah Boulin
- Frédéric Bouraly as The doctor
- Jacqueline Jehanneuf as The house owner
- Jean Dell as The notary
- Didier Flamand as Banker

== Box office ==
Country	Admissions
France	1,146,962
Spain	54,101
Belgium	5,803
Switzerland	2,259
Luxembourg	760

== Discography ==
The CD soundtrack, including the scores of Nothing to Declare and Bienvenue chez les Ch'tis, all composed by Philippe Rombi.
