= Madison Paige =

Fictional character in the 2010 video game Heavy Rain

- Madison as she appears in Heavy Rain
- First game: Heavy Rain (2010)
- Voiced by: Judi Beecher; Barbara Scaff (The Taxidermist)
- Motion capture: Judi Beecher (face); Jacqui Ainsley (body, also 3D model)

Madison Paige is a fictional character in the 2010 video game Heavy Rain. Within Heavy Rain, she is presented as a female photographer and journalist who suffers from chronic insomnia. She is one of four played protagonists in the game, and begins investigating the "Origami Killer", a serial killer who targets children and drowns them in rainwater. At certain points she may be killed and eliminated from play.

Judi Beecher serves as her voice actress and facial motion capture, while the character is modelled after Jacqui Ainsley who also provides the motion capture for her body. In addition to the main game, the character is also the star of the downloadable prequel The Taxidermist, wherein she is instead voiced by Barbara Scaff.

The character has received a generally positive reception, with Game Informer's Megan Marie praising her character design as well as appearing on "top character" lists. Criticism fell on her shower scene, forced strip-tease, and possible sex scene with Ethan Mars (another of the game's protagonists), in the last case for looking unrealistic, and to some, sexist. The striptease scene was defended by Heavy Rain lead writer David Cage, who believed it succeeded in making the player "uncomfortable". IGN's Mike Thomsen voiced concern over her heavy sexualization.

== Character overview ==
Madison Paige is described as a 27-year-old female photographer and a journalist, and is called one of the game's most "enigmatic" characters of Heavy Rain in the developer videos. She is said to have had insomnia since she was young, where she was raised around several brothers, and finds it difficult to sleep outside of motels. Her insomnia is caused by her history as a war correspondent in Iraq, though this is never mentioned in the game itself. Guillaume de Fondaumière, co-CEO of Quantic Dream, commented that her character was "strong, but fragile", a trait due to her character and not her gender, and viewed her as a central character, a role he considered "interesting" compared to other female video game characters. Model Jacqui Ainsley described her as "strong yet vulnerable, willing to take a risk for the things she believes in", noting the ability of the player to shape her character.

== In Heavy Rain ==
The character makes her debut and only appearance in 2010's Heavy Rain, developed by French studio Quantic Dream. She is introduced in her apartment, being unable to sleep. After taking a shower and trying to sleep once more, she notices the apartment has been broken into. The two invaders then attack, though ultimately are revealed to be a nightmare caused by Madison's poor sleeping. Madison then goes to a motel to try to help her sleep, where she meets other protagonist Ethan Mars, who has been injured after attempting the Origami Killer's first trial in order to find his son (who has been abducted by the killer). Though she doesn't know the cause, she helps him to his room and treats his wounds. Later in the game, she tends to Ethan's wounds again after he tries to complete another trial. After this, Madison helps Ethan to avoid the police who now believe him to be the Origami Killer, though whether she is successful depends on the player's actions. After they return to the motel, or after Ethan arrives having escaped the police station after being freed by another of the protagonists, FBI agent Norman Jayden, she learns why Ethan is now on the run, and that he is completing trials to find letters of the address where his son is being held.

Madison begins her own investigation, beginning by questioning Adrian Baker, a fired surgeon who now illegally deals medical supplies as drugs. If the player does not have Madison leave after finding evidence leading her to the club, or has her drink Baker's secretly drugged drink, she is knocked out and wakes up tied to an operating table. If the player fails to escape here, Madison will be killed and removed from the game's future chapters. If she lives, she will then go to the Blue Lagoon and interrogate Paco Mendez, the club's owner. After Paco leads her to his office to be private, he pulls a gun on her and forces her to strip. After stripping clothes until the player manages to surprise hit Paco with a lamp, she ties him up and begins questioning him. Next, she goes back to the motel and talks with Ethan. Madison leans in to kiss Ethan, and the player, as Ethan, may choose whether or not to embrace her, leading to a sex scene, or reject her. After the sex scene, Ethan finds her photos and the beginning of a story about him as the possible Origami Killer. As Ethan, the player may choose whether Ethan tells her to leave, ending the romance, or forgives her. Whichever the player chooses, Madison leaves, and notices the cops. The player may have her warn Ethan, who may or may not be arrested depending on the player's next actions as him.

She then visits Ann Sheppard, an old woman suffering from Alzheimer's disease and the mother of two sons, one of which drowned in rainwater in a hole in a construction site, and the other who was then adopted. Madison finds the identity of the killer, Scott Shelby, and investigates his apartment. There, she may find the address where Shaun Mars, Ethan's son, is being held. Shelby eventually arrives, and sets the place ablaze while Madison is still there. Madison may die in the blaze, or the player may manage to have her escape. If she escapes and has found Shaun's location, the player may have her phone and tell either Norman or Ethan it, or have her go there alone. If the player fails to find the address and/or dies, she will be removed from play for the final level where the killer is confronted.

The ending epilogue will show different things for Madison depending on the player's actions and choices over the game. She may be shown starting a family with Ethan and Shaun, being with Ethan as he shoots himself over his son's death, sitting in her apartment with worsened insomnia, signing copies of a book about the game's events, or if she died a shot of her grave may be seen.

=== The Taxidermist ===
Heavy Rain Chronicles: The Taxidermist, a downloadable prequel for the game and an update to an earlier demo, stars Madison. Intended to be the first in a series, the rest of the Chronicles were put on indefinite hiatus after work on a PlayStation Move version of the main game began. Madison, investigating the Origami Killer, intends on interviewing Leland White, a taxidermist and possible suspect. However, when she arrives, he is not home, so thus she sneaks in. In his house, she discovers a murdered woman in a bloody bathtub, and in another room numerous stuffed and posed corpses of women. Depending on the player's actions, Madison may end up sneaking out without Leland noticing, be noticed but manage to escape regardless, kill Leland, be killed herself, or phone the police and hide until they come.

== Development ==
The character was modelled after Jacqui Ainsley. A key change from Jacqui Ainsley is Madison's hair: whereas Ainsley was blonde and had long hair, this was considered too "sophisticated" for Madison, so instead the hair was cut and made black. Heavy Rain uses "virtual actors", partly as a desire to avoid making the character a composite of "four to five" people due to the regular way of splitting animation, etc., which was believed to be detrimental to creating realistic, consistent characters. The developers had identified the eyes as important after their earlier The Casting demo, and so created specific technology to allow them to match eye animations with facial expressions in motion capture.

Despite wanting to avoid making the character a composite, Judi Beecher provided Madison's voice, as well as her facial motion capture. Heavy Rain marked Beecher's first role in a video game, having previously had a background in theatre. Beecher came on late to the project, and the first demo – The Taxidermist, in which Madison was voiced by Barbara Scaff – had already been made, before it was decided to recast the character. Beecher was contacted by her French agent in July 2008, after Quantic Dream had heard her voice demo and requested her, and told to audition. The audition involved a cold reading of 5 or 6 different scenes with different endings. The developers considered having her do the body capture, but were concerned that it would not match the movements of the shorter Ainsley, and were not willing to redo all the motion capturing. Madison had 150 pages of scripted dialogue; due to the motion capture, the script could not be seen and thus had to be learnt, which took Beecher roughly a month.

In one of the earliest concepts for the game, Madison visited her news office, the America Tribune, numerous times, where she could investigate possible suspects, speak to her boss, as well as write articles. For her first scene in the game, in her apartment, the developers wanted to ensure she came across as more than "the standard female video game stereotype" and make the player feel like they closely knew her. Her apartment was originally to be in the process of redecorating, and the player was able to repaint the walls and change its layout, giving the player a chance for personalisation. Another scene, where Paco forces the character to strip at gunpoint, was intended to make the character feel uncomfortable, and also demonstrate how strong-minded the character was and how far she was willing to go for her information.

Madison was first publicly shown during E3 2009, the second of the four protagonists to be revealed (after Norman Jayden). Specifically shown was the level where Madison enters the Blue Lagoon to talk to Paco. The character also was shown topless in Playboy's December 2009 issue. Paco's forced striptease would later lead to the release of a PEGI 16-rated version of the game, something that shocked and annoyed de Fondaumière – who believed the scene was not 18-worthy, and expected the finger scene over the striptease might need to be cut. After hearing the requested, complex changes, the developers decided to go for a fade to black, where instead the player hears her beating him and getting the info.

== Reception ==
Madison received a generally positive reception. Prior to the game's release, Game Informer's Megan Marie praised her character design, listing her as one of "Ten Faces We Won't Soon Forget", citing her "intimately rendered face" and detailed face. Polish portal Wirtualna Polska listed her at 10 in a list of "most beautiful girls from games", drawing attention not only to her looks but also her interesting personality. After release, Matt Bradford of GamesRadar listed her, together with Ethan, as two of the best "everyman heroes" in gaming, saying they "proved that normal people can come through in the end... provided you press the right buttons." Entertainment Weekly's Darren Franich listed her as one of "15 Kick-Ass Women in Videogames", commenting on Heavy Rain's "down-to-Earth" characters, and considering her as an "anti-Lara Croft". Mike Thomsen, for IGN, criticised Madison, calling her "[a] realistic character, but a male fantasy nonetheless", noting numerous moments where the game sexualised her, and how she didn't "seem to have any concept of her own sexual interests or wants unless they're in the context of the men who surround her".

== See also ==
- Gender representation in video games
