= Not Another Happy Ending =

2013 film by John McKay

- UK release poster
- Directed by: John McKay
- Written by: David Solomons
- Produced by: Claire Mundell; Wendy Griffin
- Starring: Karen Gillan; Stanley Weber; Iain De Caestecker; Freya Mavor; Amy Manson; Gary Lewis; Kate Dickie; Henry Ian Cusick
- Cinematography: George Geddes
- Edited by: Calum Puss
- Music by: Lorne Balfe
- Production companies: Synchronicity Films Ltd. British Film Company
- Distributed by: Kaleidoscope Home Entertainment
- Release dates: 30 June 2013 (Edinburgh Film Festival); 11 October 2013 (United Kingdom); 8 August 2014 (United States)
- Running time: 102 minutes
- Country: United Kingdom
- Language: English

Not Another Happy Ending is a 2013 British romantic comedy film directed by John McKay, starring Karen Gillan, Stanley Weber and Freya Mavor. Produced by Claire Mundell and Wendy Griffin, and written by David Solomons, the film premiered at the Edinburgh International Film Festival on 30 June 2013. It was largely shot in Glasgow's Merchant City.

== Plot ==
Scottish writer Jane Lockhart has received multiple rejection letters before Tom Duvall, the Franco-Scottish editor of a struggling publishing company, tells her he will publish her first novel. Overcome with happy surprise, she breaks out in tears. They develop a positive working relationship through the editing process, but she impulsively tells him she will not work with him after she completes her contracted second book, as he changed the title for her debut without her consent. The book is a success, the first big hit Tom has published, and Jane wins an award for best new writer. Willie Scott, the screenwriter who presented her with the award, flirts with her on stage and they end up becoming a couple.

Towards the end of her second book, Jane suffers writer's block. She procrastinates, and she begins to imagine the protagonist of the book appearing at awkward moments. Tom is convinced she cannot write because she is excessively happy, inspired by his roommate's theory that great art comes from misery. He tries to make her feel bad to get her writing back on track but, in the process, realises he is in love with her.

After finally managing to read what she has written so far, Tom is elated, and the two almost kiss. They are interrupted when Jane receives a call from Willie, professing his love and proposing. However, on his return, the romance appears to have left their relationship. He takes her for granted, and they settle into a dull routine. He finishes writing his screenplay adaptation of her debut, but changes the ending, making it a happy one. Tom suggests he revert to the original ending of the book, but Willie refuses. Upon seeing the changes he has made, Jane leaves to finish the book alone in the countryside.

Tom follows her, with an apology and a suggestion to rewrite the ending. She makes him stay out in the cold until nightfall, but ultimately lets him in. After she blows up at him, they finally kiss, another inspirational wave hits her. The closing scene is in a cemetery, Jane is saying a few words over a casket. Suddenly it is announced by Tom that she will be signing copies of her new book, which they take from the casket. Taking her aside, he offers a new book contract, and they kiss.

== Cast ==
- Karen Gillan as Jane Lockhart
- Stanley Weber as Tom Duvall
- Iain De Caestecker as Roddy
- Freya Mavor as Nicola Ball
- Amy Manson as Darsie
- Gary Lewis as Benny Lockhart
- Kate Dickie as Anna le Fevre
- Henry Ian Cusick as Willie Scott
- Matilda Thorpe as Andrea

== Production ==
The film was financed in part by a crowdfunding campaign on the website Indiegogo, which raised US$22,660. Additional funding came through the efforts of producer Claire Mundell, who "[patch-worked] a bunch of different sources of funding together, none of whom interfered in any kind of way with the way the film turned out".

Scottish actor Emun Elliott was originally attached to play the role of Tom, but was replaced with French actor Stanley Weber. This led the filmmakers to write into the script the character's French background, as well as "a lot of explanation about how this French guy could end up in Glasgow and be a publisher".

== Reception ==
The film received mostly negative reviews. On review aggregator website Rotten Tomatoes, the film holds an approval rating of 31% based on 16 reviews, with an average rating of 3.86/10.

Reviewing it in The Times, Wendy Ide described the film as being "so cloyingly perky and twee, you want to feed the whole film, bestselling novels and all, into a shredder." Writing in The Guardian, Mike McCahill gave the film 1 star out of 5, calling it "lamentably close to the modern romcom average".

In The Daily Telegraph, David Gritten was similarly unimpressed, criticising both the screenplay and Gillan's acting, concluding that "The film's ending was indeed a happy moment, but not in the intended manner." Time Out gave the film 1 star out of 5, calling it "a great advert for Glasgow, but it delivers an awful warning to filmmakers about shooting a script that's seriously unready for public consumption."
