= About Joan =

2022 drama film

- Theatrical release poster
- French: À propos de Joan
- Directed by: Laurent Larivière
- Screenplay by: François Decodts; Laurent Larivière
- Produced by: Xavier Rigault; Marc-Antoine Robert; M. Reza Bahar; Katie Holly
- Starring: Isabelle Huppert; Lars Eidinger; Swann Arlaud; Freya Mavor
- Cinematography: Céline Bozon
- Edited by: Marie-Pierre Frappier
- Music by: Jérôme Rebotier
- Production companies: 2.4.7. Films (France); Gifted Films (Germany); Blinder Films (Ireland)
- Distributed by: Camino Filmverleih (Germany); Haut et Court (France)
- Release dates: 15 February 2022 (Berlin); 31 August 2022 (Germany); 14 September 2022 (France)
- Running time: 101 minutes
- Countries: France; Germany; Ireland
- Languages: English; French; German; Japanese
- Box office: $70,677

About Joan (French: À propos de Joan, German: Die Zeit, die wir teilen, lit. 'The Time That We Share') is a 2022 drama film directed by Laurent Larivière. The film stars Isabelle Huppert, Lars Eidinger and Swann Arlaud. It is a French-German-Irish co-production.

The film had its world premiere at the 72nd Berlin International Film Festival on 15 February 2022. On this occasion, Huppert received the Honorary Golden Bear for her entire career.

== Plot ==
Joan Verra is an independent, loving woman with a free and adventurous spirit. When her first love returns without warning after years of absence, she decides not to tell him that they had a son together. This lie by omission is an opportunity for her to revisit her life: her youth in Ireland, her professional success, her loves and her relationship with her son. A seemingly fulfilled life, but one which hides a secret that she will have to face.

== Cast ==
- Isabelle Huppert as Joan Verra
  - Freya Mavor as Joan Verra, in the 1970s
- Lars Eidinger as Tim Ardenne
- Swann Arlaud as Nathan Verra
  - Louis Broust as Nathan Verra, in the 1980s
  - Dimitri Doré as Nathan Verra, in the 1990s
- Florence Loiret-Caille as Madeleine Verra
- Stanley Townsend as Doug
  - Éanna Hardwicke as Doug, in the 1970s
- Fabrice Scott as James

== Production ==
In September 2020, it was announced that Isabelle Huppert, Lars Eidinger and Swann Arlaud were cast in a new film directed by Laurent Larivière.

Filming took place for a week in Cologne, Germany, four weeks in Lyon, France and six days in Dublin, Ireland.

The film is a French-German-Irish co-production. Laurent Larivière wrote the script with François Decodts with the intent of making a "novel-like film spanning different periods over forty years in different countries, a film in which you could hear several languages." Four languages can be heard spoken in the film: English, German, French, and a bit of Japanese at the end of the film.

== Release ==
The film was an official selection at the 72nd Berlin International Film Festival, in the section Berlinale Special Gala. It had its world premiere at the Berlin International Film Festival on 15 February 2022. On this occasion, the actress Isabelle Huppert received the Honorary Golden Bear for her entire career. It was screened at the Dublin International Film Festival on 25 February 2022. It was theatrically released in Germany by Camino Filmverleih on 31 August 2022. It was theatrically released in France by Haut et Court on 14 September 2022.

== Reception ==
=== Critical response ===
On Rotten Tomatoes, the film holds an approval rating of 38% based on 8 reviews, with an average rating of 5.1/10. About Joan received an average rating of 2.9 out of 5 stars on the French website AlloCiné, based on 20 reviews.
