= Odile Schmitt =

French actress (1956–2020)

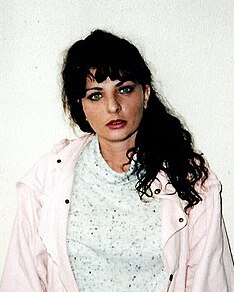
- Schmitt in 1997
- Born: Odile Huguette Simone Schmitt; November 5, 1956; Algiers, Algeria
- Died: March 24, 2020 (aged 63); Creil
- Occupation: Actress
- Years active: 1979–2020

Odile Schmitt (November 5, 1956 – March 24, 2020) was a French actress. She often dubbed the French language-versions of films featuring Eva Longoria and Lola Bunny in the Looney Tunes franchise.

== Biography ==
Schmitt was educated at the Conservatoire de Strasbourg. She took courses alongside Andréas Voutsinas and John Strasberg. Her first dubbing appearance was in The Mysterious Cities of Gold in 1982. After dubbing Eva Longoria in The Young and the Restless, Schmitt became the regular dubber for the American actress. Odile Schmitt died on 24 March 2020 after a long illness.

== Theatre ==
- Les Feux de la Gloire (2002)
- Les Feux de la Gloire (2004–2005)
- Amour, Gore et Beauté (2009)
- Andromaque (2009–2011)
- Les Justes (2012–2013)

== Filmography ==
Year	Title	Role	Notes
1979	Memoirs of a French Whore		
1980	Christa, folle de son sexe	Brigitte	
1981	Les Enquêtes du commissaire Maigret	Anastasie	Episode: "Le pendu de Saint-Phollien"
1981	Light Years Away	Dancer	
1982	Nestor Burma, détective de choc	La droguée	
1988	La Travestie	Jackie	
2010	Film Socialisme	Female	Voice, (segment "Nos humanités")
2011	Hollywoo	Pénélope	
