= Eyjafjallajökull (film) =

2013 film directed by Alexandre Coffre

Eyjafjallajökull Le Volcan (in Quebec)
- Film poster
- Directed by: Alexandre Coffre
- Written by: Alexandre Coffre; Laurent Zeitoun; Yoann Gromb
- Produced by: Nicolas Duval Adassovsky; Laurent Zeitoun; Yann Zenou
- Starring: Valérie Bonneton; Dany Boon; Denis Ménochet; Bérangère McNeese; Albert Delpy
- Cinematography: Pierre Cottereau
- Edited by: Sophie Fourdrinoy
- Music by: Thomas Roussel
- Production companies: Quad Productions; TF1 Films Production; Mars Films; Les Productions du Ch'timi; Chaocorp Développement; Scope Pictures
- Distributed by: Mars Distribution
- Release dates: 24 August 2013 (Angoulême); 2 October 2013 (France)
- Running time: 92 minutes
- Countries: France; Belgium
- Language: French
- Budget: $25.2 million
- Box office: $19.2 million

Eyjafjallajökull (Icelandic pronunciation: [ˈɛɪjaˌfjadlaˌjœːkʏtl̥]) or Le Volcan in Quebec is a 2013 French comedy film directed by Alexandre Coffre.

== Plot summary ==
Divorced couple Valérie and Alain make their way to their daughter's wedding in a small Greek village during the volcanic eruptions of Eyjafjallajökull, which grounds many airplanes in Europe.

== Cast ==
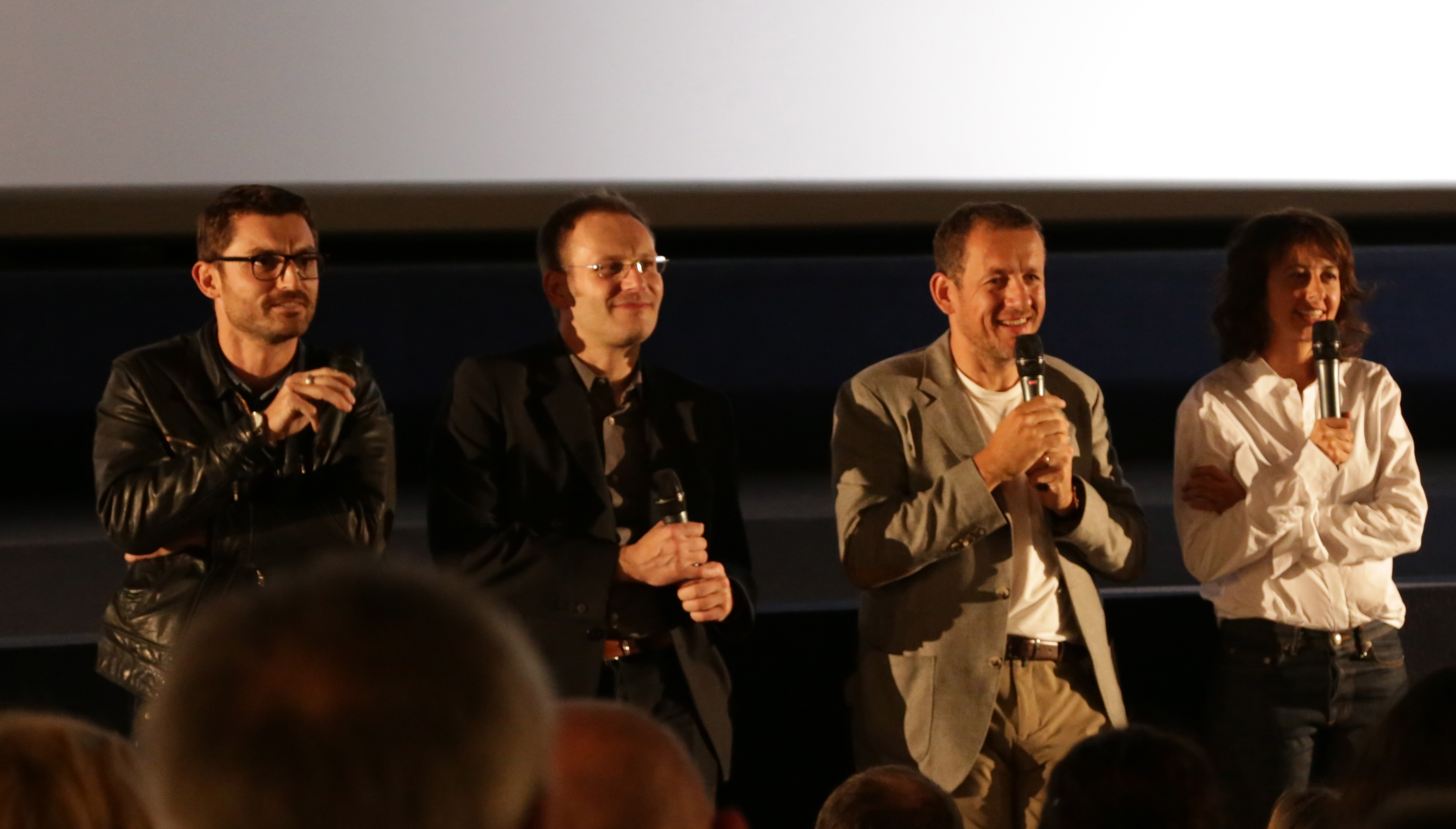
Director Alexandre Coffre on the left, during the presentation of the film on 16 September 2013 in Lyon (France).

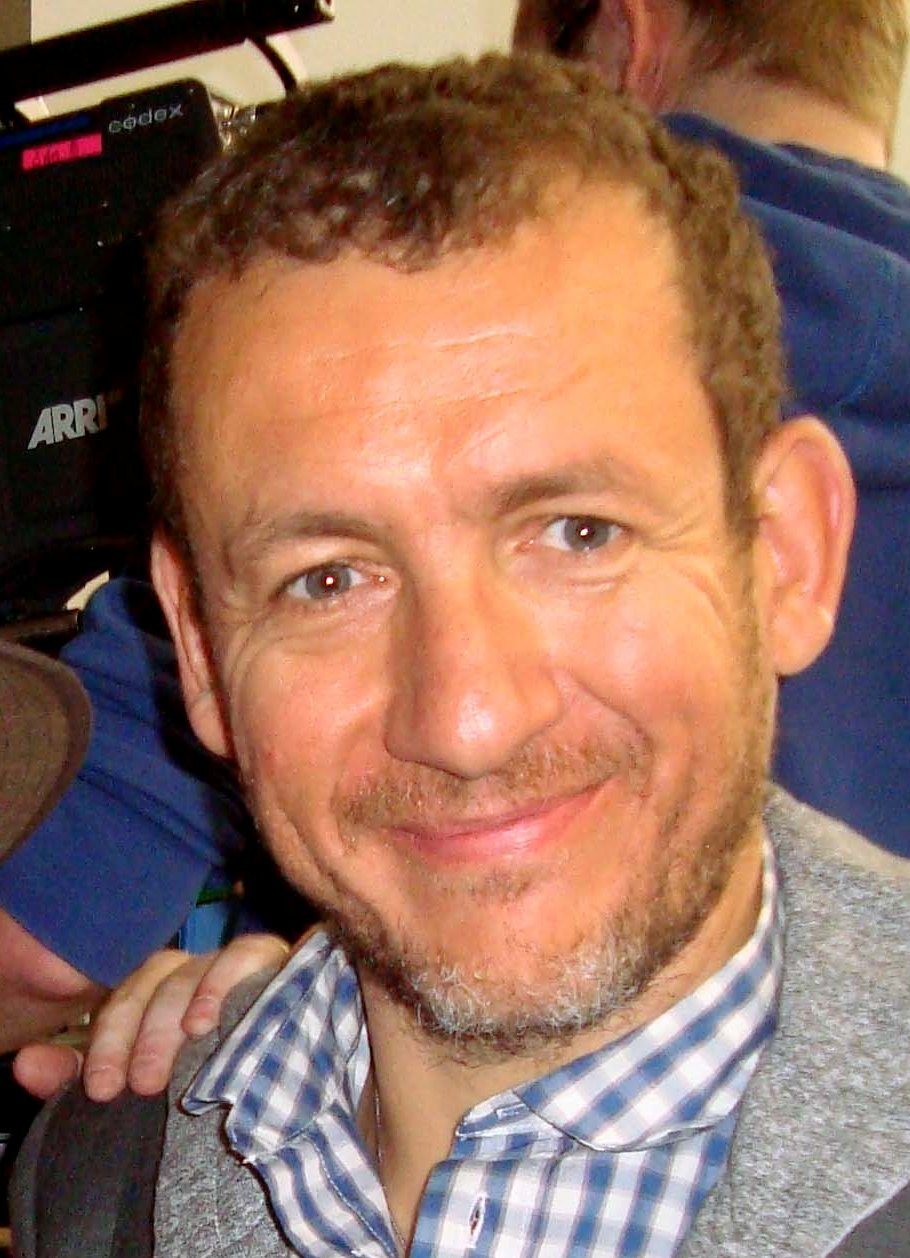
Star Dany Boon on the set of the movie.

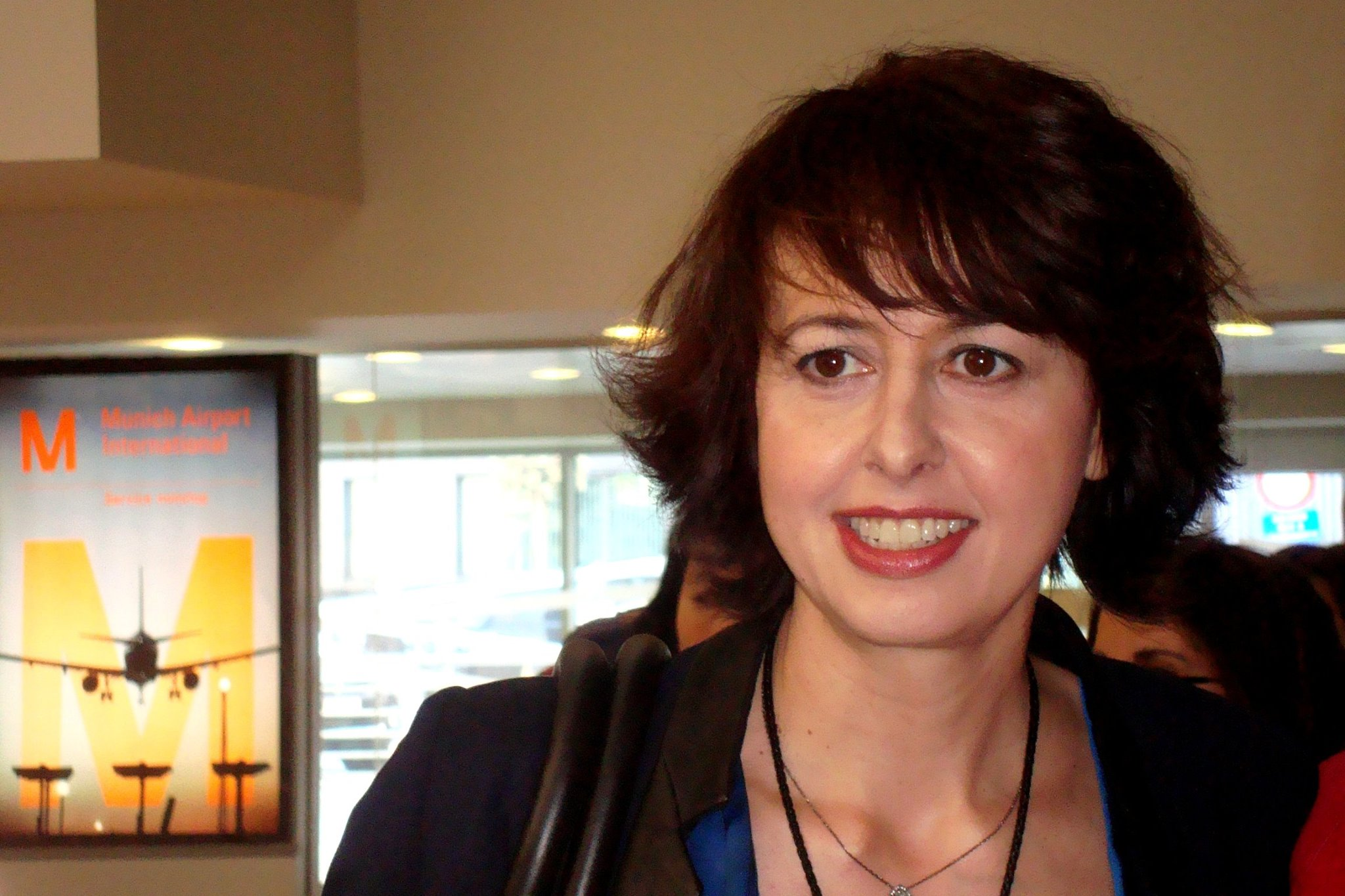
And the main actress Valérie Bonneton.

- Valérie Bonneton — Valérie
- Dany Boon — Alain
- Denis Ménochet — Ezéchiel
- Bérangère McNeese — Cécile
- Albert Delpy — Tonton Roger
- Constance Dollé — Sylvie
- Malik Bentalha — Cécile's friend
- Tiphaine Daviot — Cécile's friend
- Valentine Carette — Joshina
- Myriam Azencot — Airplane seatmate
- Arnaud Henriet — Alain's airplane seatmate
- Yann Sorton — Stewart the Greek
- Jochen Hägele — German Avis Agent
- Barbara Ornellas — Woman in motorcoach
- Brigitte Böttrich — B&B Owner
- Markus Baumeister — Gas station man
- Magdalena Steinlein — Gas station girl
- Joan Pascu — Coach driver
- Joze Zalar —Supporter in the bus
- Jernej Campelj — Hotel night receptionist Slovenia
- Sanja Marin — Hotel day receptionist Slovenia
- Amar Bukvic — Police Officer 1 Ljubljana Airport
- Frano Domitrovic — Police Officer 2 Ljubljana Airport
- Adnan Palangic — Erion
- Bozidar Smiljanic — Osman
- Thodoros Katsafados — Greek chief of police
- Chryssa Florou — Greek translator
- Bartholomew Boutellis — Stavros
- Filippos Zografos —The Pope
- Athina Masoura — Choir 1
- Ioannis Papazoglou — Choir 2

== Soundtrack ==
Dany Boon hums the song Cécile, ma fille by Claude Nougaro throughout the film.

=== Original soundtrack ===
The movie's original soundtrack was composed by Thomas Roussel and published by Quad. It contains a CD of eighteen tracks released on 30 September 2013.

No.	Title	Writer / Performer(s)	Length
1.	"Opening Title (Eyjafjallajökull)"	Thomas Roussel	2:05
2.	"Bohemian Like You"	The Dandy Warhols	3:32
3.	"When They Fight, They Fight"	Generationals	3:20
4.	"Life's a Beach"	Django Django	3:06
5.	"Black Betty"	Ram Jam	3:57
6.	"Le pont"	Thomas Roussel	1:35
7.	"Jésus oh oh oh"	Patricia Bonneau-Fauchard	1:45
8.	"L'arbalette"	Thomas Roussel	2:19
9.	"Le baiser"	Thomas Roussel	1:55
10.	"Firewater"	Django Django	4:48
11.	"Le vol de voiture" (Le vol de voiture)	Thomas Roussel	1:20
12.	"Décollage !"	Thomas Roussel	1:33
13.	"Le crash" (from Live at the London Palladium, 1977)	Thomas Roussel	1:32
14.	"La steppe"	Thomas Roussel	1:03
15.	"La traversée" (from War Ina Babylon, 1976)	Thomas Roussel	1:23
16.	"Le mariage"	Thomas Roussel	1:38
17.	"Eyjafjallajökull (Thomas Roussel Remix)"	Eliza Geirsdottir Newman	2:32
18.	"Baptême de l'air"	Thomas Roussel	1:24
Total length:			40' 36"
