= Supercondriaque =

- Theatrical release poster
- Directed by: Dany Boon
- Written by: Dany Boon
- Produced by: Eric Hubert; Jérôme Seydoux
- Starring: Kad Merad; Dany Boon; Alice Pol
- Cinematography: Romain Winding
- Edited by: Monica Coleman
- Music by: Klaus Badelt
- Production companies: Pathé; Canal+
- Distributed by: Pathé
- Release date: 26 February 2014 (France)
- Running time: 107 minutes
- Countries: France; Belgium
- Language: French
- Budget: $36.3 million
- Box office: $53.4 million

Supercondriaque (also known as Superchondriac) is a 2014 French comedy film written and directed by Dany Boon.

== Plot ==
Romain Faubert is a mature man who can never hide his hypochondriasis. Romain's fears are profitable for his doctor Dimitri Zvenka. Even so, Dimitri really wants to cure the patient who has no other friend than him. He feels that Romain's actual problem is his loneliness rather than anything else. He subsequently helps Romain in seeking an appropriate female companion, but after a great many futile attempts, he loses hope that Romain could ever succeed. In need of an alternative, he decides to take Romain with him when he goes to an eastern European refugee camp (refugees speak, in fact, distorted version of Russian, Ukrainian and Slovenian, where Dimitri sometimes works on behalf of a non-profit organisation. He believes the sight of people who are really suffering might bring Romain to his senses. Yet Romain finally finds the love of his life when he gets to know Dimitri's sister who confuses him with Anton Miroslav, a certain freedom fighter. The real Anton Miroslav has stolen Romain's ID and is hiding in the apartment of the hypochondriac.

== Cast ==
- Dany Boon as Romain Faubert
- Alice Pol as Anna Zvenka
- Kad Merad as Dr. Dimitri Zvenka
- Jean-Yves Berteloot as Anton Miroslav
- Judith El Zein as Norah Zvenka
- Marthe Villalonga as Dimitri's mother
- Valérie Bonneton as Isabelle
- Bruno Lochet as Policeman in the service of the immigration bureau
- Jérôme Commandeur as Guillaume Lempreur
- Jonathan Cohen as Marc
- Vanessa Guide as Manon
- Marion Barby as Nina Zvenka
- Camille Chamoux as Dimitri's secretary
- Étienne Chicot as Professor

== Reception ==
The film earned a total of US$56.5 million internationally. L'Obs called it "un succès fou" — a huge success — "despite the critics" and noted that it attracted more cinemagoers in its first week than any film since Nothing to Declare, Boon's 2010 hit.

== See also ==
- List of French films of 2014
