= The Jews (film) =

- Theatrical release poster
- Ils sont partout
- Directed by: Yvan Attal
- Written by: Yvan Attal; Emilie Frèche
- Produced by: Thomas Langmann
- Starring: Benoît Poelvoorde; Valérie Bonneton; Dany Boon; Charlotte Gainsbourg; Grégory Gadebois; Denis Podalydès; Gilles Lellouche; François Damiens; Yvan Attal
- Cinematography: Rémy Chevrin
- Edited by: Jennifer Augé
- Music by: Evgueni Galperine; Sacha Galperine
- Production company: La Petite Reine
- Distributed by: Wild Bunch Distribution
- Release date: 1 June 2016
- Running time: 111 minutes
- Country: France
- Language: French
- Box office: $1.2 million

The Jews (original title: Ils sont partout, or "They Are Everywhere") is a 2016 French-language film directed by Yvan Attal. The film deals with antisemitism in France.

== Synopsis ==
Yvan hears himself saying that he exaggerates and is paranoid when he talks about the growing antisemitism. He decides to consult his shrink to talk about his identity and understand what it means today to be French and Jewish. During the dialogue, crossed stories, cynical and provocative, are exposed in the form of leaflets.

== Cast ==
- Benoît Poelvoorde as Boris
- Valérie Bonneton as Eva
- Dany Boon as Pascal
- Charlotte Gainsbourg as Mathilde
- Grégory Gadebois as a Talmudist #1
- Denis Podalydès as a Talmudist #2
- Gilles Lellouche as Norbert
- François Damiens as Roger
- Yvan Attal as Yvan
- Freya Mavor as Marie
- Émilie Gavois-Kahn as Rabbi's wife
