= A Perfect Plan =

- Theatrical release poster
- Directed by: Pascal Chaumeil
- Screenplay by: Laurent Zeitoun; Yoann Gromb
- Story by: Philippe Mechelen
- Produced by: Nicolas Duval-Adassovsky; Laurent Zeitoun; Yann Zenou
- Starring: Diane Kruger; Dany Boon; Alice Pol
- Cinematography: Glynn Speeckaert
- Edited by: Dorian Rigal-Ansous
- Music by: Klaus Badelt
- Production company: Quad Productions
- Distributed by: Universal Pictures
- Release date: 31 October 2012 (France)
- Running time: 104 minutes
- Country: France
- Language: French
- Budget: $26.3 million
- Box office: $16 million

A Perfect Plan (French: Un plan parfait) is a 2012 French action adventure comedy film directed by Pascal Chaumeil and starring Diane Kruger, Dany Boon, and Alice Pol. It is released as Fly Me to the Moon in Canada and Australia. Written by Laurent Zeitoun and Yoann Gromb, and based on a story by Philippe Mechelen, the film is about a woman in love who tries to break her family curse of every first marriage ending badly by dashing to the altar with a random stranger before marrying her boyfriend.

== Plot ==
Isabelle is prepared to marry Pierre, the man she has loved for the past ten years, but first must overcome a curse that afflicts the female members of her family: all their first marriages are unhappy. She comes up with the perfect plan: marry a stranger, get a quick divorce to avoid the curse, and be happily married forever the second time. She flies to Copenhagen and finds the perfect pigeon in Jean-Yves, an editor for the Guide du Routard, but her plans are complicated when he believes that she is in love with him. When an arranged marriage falls through, she tracks down Jean-Yves again in hopes she can somehow marry him and divorce him without too much trouble. She ends up following him with divorce papers, which he eventually signs after hearing her talking to her sister on the phone. She then explains the family curse and they spend the next day hanging out. After leaving, she realises she loves him, breaks off her engagement, and she and Jean-Yves live happily ever after.

== Cast ==
- Diane Kruger as Isabelle
- Dany Boon as Jean-Yves
- Alice Pol as Corinne
- Robert Plagnol as Pierre
- Jonathan Cohen as Patrick
- Bernadette Le Saché as Solange
- Étienne Chicot as Edmond
- Laure Calamy as Valérie
- Malonn Lévana as Louise
- Olivier Claverie as Lawyer Maillard
- Damien Bonnard as Romain

== Production ==
A Perfect Plan was filmed on location in Moscow, Russia and Antwerp, Flanders, Belgium.

== Reception ==
=== Critical response ===
Review aggregation website Rotten Tomatoes reported an approval rating of 33%, based on 18 reviews, with an average score of 5/10.

In his review in The Hollywood Reporter, Jordon Mintzer wrote that the film "works best as a portrait of two opposites who come together out of empathy, rather than out of love." In his review in The Montreal Gazette, T'Cha Dunlevy felt that the film "may have worked on paper, but the execution leaves much to be desired".

=== Box office ===
Upon its theatrical release, A Perfect Plan earned $16 million worldwide.
