= Hollywoo =

- Film poster
- Directed by: Frédéric Berthe; Pascal Serieis
- Written by: Florence Foresti; Pascal Serieis; Xavier Maingon; Patrick Fouque
- Produced by: Cyril Colbeau-Justin; Jean-Baptiste Dupont; Jeremy Burdek; Serge de Poucques; Sylvain Goldberg; Nadia Khamlichi; Adrian Politowski; Gilles Waterkeyn; Patrick Batteux; David Giordano; Christophe Bichot; Catalina Restrepo
- Starring: Florence Foresti; Jamel Debbouze
- Cinematography: Ludovic Colbeau-Justin
- Edited by: Philippe Bourgueil
- Music by: Philippe Rombi
- Production company: LGM Productions
- Distributed by: StudioCanal
- Release date: 7 December 2011
- Running time: 107 minutes
- Country: France
- Languages: French; English
- Budget: $18.3 million
- Box office: $20.6 million

Hollywoo is a 2011 French comedy film directed by Frédéric Berthe and Pascal Serieis.

== Plot ==
Jeanne Rinaldi makes a living by dubbing Jennifer Marshall in a TV series (L.A Couples). When she learns that Jennifer has given up her role, Jeanne flies to Hollywood to convince her to return to the series. There, she meets Farres, who opens the doors of the star system for her.

== Cast ==
- Florence Foresti as Jeanne Rinaldi
- Jamel Debbouze as Farres
- Nikki DeLoach as Jennifer Marshall
- Muriel Robin as Michèle
- Sophie Mounicot as Marie
- Robert Maschio as Goldman
- Alex Lutz as Jean-Philippe
- Jérôme Commandeur as Bob
- Jeff Roop as Mike
- Kirk B. R. Woller as Jordan
- Demetrius Grosse as Gangsta
- Irina Voronina as Gruth
- Laurie Searle as Ms. Steinhauer
- Grégoire Bonnet as Cédric
- Jack Brand as Jerry Flash
- Momo Casablanca as Slimane
- John Gleeson Connolly as Detective Starsky
- Marc Raducci as Detective Hutch
- Régis Gaudrot as Croco
- Chieko Hidaka as Cindy
- Min Man Ma as Daniel
- John Sanderford as Marlow
- Carrie Stevens as Marlow's girlfriend
- Odile Schmitt as Pénélope
- Jared Ward as Howard
- Charlie Weirauch as MC
- Guillaume Dabinpons as Gilles
- Anna Mountford as Genevieve
- Shira Scott Astrof as Eva
- Manel Souza as Guy
- Trae Ireland as W. Smith
- C.J. Jimenez as Pamela
- Karine Valmer as Sabine
- Frank Novak as the Palace Man
- Rakefet Abergel as the Assistant
- Kaitlyn Black as The Hostess VIP Room
- Zak Knutson as The Guardian at Paramount
- Karl Lagerfeld as himself
