= Life for Real =

2023 comedy film

- Theatrical release poster
- French: La Vie pour de vrai
- Directed by: Dany Boon
- Written by: Dany Boon
- Produced by: Jérôme Seydoux
- Starring: Dany Boon; Charlotte Gainsbourg; Kad Merad
- Cinematography: Glynn Speeckaert
- Music by: Alexandre Lecluyse
- Production companies: Pathé; 26 Db Productions; TF1 Films Production
- Distributed by: Pathé
- Release date: 19 April 2023 (France)
- Running time: 110 minutes
- Countries: France; Belgium
- Language: French
- Budget: €23-31.3 million
- Box office: 6.1 million

Life for Real (French: La Vie pour de vrai) is a 2023 comedy film written and directed by Dany Boon. It is a co-production between France and Belgium. The film stars Boon, Charlotte Gainsbourg and Kad Merad. It was theatrically released by Pathé on 19 April 2023.

== Synopsis ==
Tridan Lagache has spent his life at Club Med, changing friends every 8 days. At 50, he resigned from the Mexican vacation club where he was born, determined to find, 42 years later, his great childhood love, Violette.

In Paris, he discovers he has a half-brother, Louis, who he stays with. To get rid of his new guest, Louis convinces his friend Roxane to pretend to be Violette, whom Tridan thinks he recognizes at first sight.

== Cast ==
- Dany Boon as Tridan Lagache
- Charlotte Gainsbourg as Roxane
- Kad Merad as Louis
- Maxime Gasteuil as Didier Lagache
- Caroline Anglade as Françoise Lagache
- Aurore Clément as Françoise Lagache (age 70)
- Gaël Raës as Tridan (age 8)
- Tatiana Gousseff as Christelle
- Mathieu Madénian as Clandestine Taxi Driver
- Valérie Crouzet as Violette Charmet
- Tania Garbarski as the other Violette Charmet
- Carole Brana as Violette's mother
- Sarah Boon as Héléna
- Antoine Schoumsky as Police Officer
- Frédéric Clou as Client VTC

== Production ==
Life for Real was produced by Jérôme Seydoux, co-produced through Pathé, 26 Db Productions, and TF1 Films Production. Shooting commenced on 16 May 2022 and took place between Italy, Belgium and France.

== Release ==
The film was theatrically released by Pathé on 19 April 2023.

== Reception ==
=== Box office ===
Life for Real grossed $6.1 million in France, and $38,778 in other territories, for a worldwide total of $6.1 million.

In France, the film opened alongside Evil Dead Rise, La Plus Belle pour aller danser, The Conference, La Dernière Reine, Chien de la casse, Avant l'effondrement, and Blue Jean. The film sold 80,254 admissions on its first day, 39,129 of which were preview screenings. It went on to sell 351,479 admissions in its opening weekend, finishing 3rd at the box office, behind The Super Mario Bros. Movie and The Three Musketeers: D'Artagnan. At the end of its theatrical run, the film sold a total of 802,694 admissions.

=== Critical response ===
Life for Real received an average rating of 2.8 out of 5 stars on the French website AlloCiné, based on 26 reviews.
