= Cézanne and I =

2016 film

- Theatrical release poster
- Cézanne et moi
- Directed by: Danièle Thompson
- Written by: Danièle Thompson
- Produced by: Albert Koski
- Starring: Guillaume Canet; Guillaume Gallienne; Alice Pol; Déborah François; Isabelle Candelier; Freya Mavor; Pierre Yvon; Romain Cottard; Romain Lancry; Félicien Juttner; Alexandre Kouchner; Gérard Meylan; Sabine Azéma
- Cinematography: Jean-Marie Dreujou
- Edited by: Sylvie Landra
- Music by: Éric Neveux
- Production companies: G Films; Pathé; Orange Studio; France 2 Cinéma uMedia; Alter Films
- Distributed by: Pathé Distribution
- Release date: 21 September 2016
- Running time: 116 minutes
- Country: France
- Language: French
- Budget: $11.3 million
- Box office: $4.3 million

Cézanne and I (original title: Cézanne et moi) is a 2016 French biographical drama film based on the friendship between 19th century novelist Émile Zola and painter Paul Cézanne. The film was written and directed by Danièle Thompson; it stars Guillaume Canet, Guillaume Gallienne, Alice Pol, Déborah François and Sabine Azéma. It was named as one of four films on the shortlist for the French submission for the Academy Award for Best Foreign Language Film at the 89th Academy Awards.

== Cast ==
- Guillaume Canet as Émile Zola
  - Lucien Belves as young Émile Zola
- Guillaume Gallienne as Paul Cézanne
  - Hugo Fernandez as young Paul Cézanne
- Alice Pol as Alexandrine Zola
- Déborah François as Hortense Cézanne
- Sabine Azéma as Elisabeth Cézanne
- Gérard Meylan as Louis-Auguste Cézanne
- Isabelle Candelier as Emilie Zola
- Freya Mavor as Jeanne
- Laurent Stocker as Ambroise Vollard
- Pierre Yvon as Baptistin Baille
  - Jérémy Nebot as young Baptistin Baille
- Félicien Juttner as Guy de Maupassant
- Flore Babled as Angèle Baille
- Romain Cottard as Camille Pissarro
- Alexandre Kouchner as Auguste Renoir
- Romain Lancry as Anchille Emperaire
- Nicolas Gob as Édouard Manet
- Christian Hecq as Père Tanguy
- Sophie de Fürst as Berthe
- Patrice Tepasso as Frédéric Bazille

== Reception ==
On the review aggregator website Rotten Tomatoes, 53% of 49 critics' reviews are positive, with an average rating of 5.4/10. Metacritic, which uses a weighted average, assigned the film a score of 54 out of 100, based on 12 critics, indicating "mixed or average" reviews.
