= Tango Shalom =

- Release poster
- Directed by: Gabriel Bologna
- Written by: Jos Laniado
- Screenplay by: Joseph Bologna; Jos Laniado; Claudio Laniado
- Produced by: Gabriel Bologna; Joseph Bologna; Zizi Bologna; Robert Meyer Burnett; Jordi Caballero; Joel Zwick; Claudio Laniado; Jos Laniado
- Starring: Jos Laniado; Karina Smirnoff; Renée Taylor; Lainie Kazan; Judi Beecher; Claudio Laniado
- Cinematography: Massimo Zeri
- Edited by: Robert Meyer Burnett
- Music by: Zoe Tiganouria; Zizi Bologna
- Production company: Convivencia Forever Films
- Distributed by: Vision Films
- Release date: September 3, 2021
- Running time: 115 minutes
- Country: United States
- Language: English

Tango Shalom (retitled Forbidden Tango after release) is a 2021 American dance comedy film directed by Gabriel Bologna and starring Jos Laniado, Judi Beecher, Renée Taylor, Lainie Kazan and Karina Smirnoff. It was produced by Joel Zwick who directed My Big Fat Greek Wedding. The movie won 25 film festival awards, including the 2021 Artisan Festival International World Peace Initiative for Best World Peace and Tolerance Narrative Feature Film Award during the Cannes Film Festival. The film premiered at the 2021 Brooklyn Film Festival, the borough where the majority of the movie was filmed.

== Plot ==
Hasidic Rabbi and amateur Hora dancer, Moshe Yehuda (Jos Laniado), enters a televised tango competition to save his Hebrew School from bankruptcy. But there is one big dilemma: in Orthodox Judaism, a married man is not allowed to touch a woman other than his wife. Moshe enlists the support of a Catholic priest (Joe Bologna) and leaders of various other faiths who understand the burden the modern world can place on traditional religious beliefs. Together, they devise a plan to assist Moshe to dance in the competition without compromising his moral code.

== Cast ==
- Jos Laniado as Rabbi Moshe Yehuda
- Claudio Laniado as Rahamim Yehuda
- Renée Taylor as Deborah Yehuda
- Lainie Kazan as Leah Zlotkin
- Joseph Bologna as Father Anthony
- Judi Beecher as Raquel Yehuda
- Karina Smirnoff as Viviana Nieves - dancer
- Philip Anthony-Rodriguez as host
- Joanne Baron as Hanna Meyer
- Marci Fine as Marina Zlotkin
- David Serero as Cantor

== Release ==
Tango Shalom had a limited theatrical release by Vision Films in the United States and Canada on September 3, 2021, collecting the highest box office receipts of any independent film that Labor Day weekend. Vision Films also picked up the film for worldwide distribution. The film received North American streaming approval on October 29, 2021.

== Reception ==
On Rotten Tomatoes, the film has an approval rating of 71% based on 14 critics, with an average rating of 6.80/10.

Bradley Gibson of Film Threat wrote, "a family film both in front of the camera and behind it".

Tom Tugend of Jewish Journal wrote, "Tango Shalom, which is populated by bearded Chassidim — not as caricatures or exotics, but as three-dimensional characters facing life's dilemmas and joys".

Pope Francis was quoted in the Vatican newspaper, L'Osservatore Romano, “I was pleased to learn of the film, Tango Shalom, which is intended to foster the values of fraternal solidarity and peace on a global level. It is my hope that this effort will serve the common good of the human family by furthering a spirit of mutual dialogue and respect for all persons. Upon all involved in the production of the film, I invoke abundant divine blessings”.

The Interfaith dialogue movement has rallied behind Tango Shalom, who have endorsements on their official website by the Palestinian Bishop of Jerusalem, Dr. Munib Younan, Chief Rabbi Yehuda Sarna, Association of British Muslims, Archbishop Felix Anthony Machado, International Council of Christians and Jews, Centre For Religion, Reconciliation and Peace, The Global Peace Initiative of Women, United Religions Initiative, Muslims for Progressive Values, The Peacemakers’ Circle Foundation, Jammu & Kashmir Policy Institute, Nobel Prize Nominee, Steve Killelea, and the Reverend Dr. Richard Sudworth, Secretary for Inter Religious Affairs for the Archbishop of Canterbury. ".

Tango Shalom holds the rare distinction of being the first film in history to have its theatrical and VOD releases actively promoted by UNESCO on social media. The film was also screened remotely at the prestigious 2021 Parliament of the World's Religions with the Dalai Lama, and Jane Goodall in attendance.

According to Gabriel Bologna, the director of the film, it's an "ethnic comedy". The film has been well received by former Soviet Union states, and was a recipient of numerous audience awards in countries with high Muslim populations, such as Morocco, United Arab Emirates, and India.
