= Light Years Away (film) =

- Directed by: Alain Tanner
- Written by: Alain Tanner
- Starring: Trevor Howard; Mick Ford
- Cinematography: Jean-François Robin
- Edited by: Brigitte Sousselier
- Music by: Arié Dzierlatka
- Distributed by: Gaumont Distribution
- Release dates: 20 May 1981 (France); 15 April 1983 (NYC)
- Running time: 105 mins
- Countries: France; Switzerland
- Language: English

Light Years Away (French: Les Années lumière) is a 1981 film directed by Alain Tanner. It tells the story of a young man who meets an old man who says he was taught by birds how to fly and is building a flying machine. It is based on a novel by Daniel Odier.

Although filmed in English and shot in Ireland, it was made by a Swiss director and produced by companies from France and Switzerland. The film won the Grand Prix at the 1981 Cannes Film Festival.

== Cast ==
- Trevor Howard as Yoshka Poliakeff
- Mick Ford as Jonas
- Bernice Stegers as Betty
- Henri Virlojeux as Lawyer
- Gerard Mannix Flynn as Drunken Boy (as Mannix Flynn)
- Don Foley as Cafe Owner
- Gabrielle Keenan as Girl At Village Dance
- John Murphy as Man In Bar
- Jerry O'Brien as Bar Owner
- Joe Pilkington as Thomas
- Louis Samier as Trucker
- Odile Schmitt as Dancer
- Vincent Smith as Cop
