= Mystère à Saint-Tropez =

- Directed by: Nicolas Benamou
- Written by: Jean-François Halin; Christian Clavier; Jean-Marie Poiré
- Produced by: Studiocanal; Ouille Productions
- Starring: Christian Clavier; Benoît Poelvoorde
- Release date: 14 July 2021
- Running time: 90 minutes
- Countries: France; Belgium
- Language: French
- Budget: 13.5 million euros

Mystère à Saint-Tropez is a French-Belgian comedy film directed by Nicolas Benamou and released in 2021.

== Plot ==
Saint-Tropez, August 1970. The principal Paris police inspector Jean Boulin from the 36 quai des Orfèvres, real ambulant cataclysm, is sent at the property of the famous Belgian billionaire Claude Tranchant to enquire on a murder attempt that is targeting his wife. In the sumpteous villa where is reunited for the holiday the flagship of the show-business, the inspector makes a series of blunders, looking for the culprit.

== Cast ==
- Christian Clavier as principal inspector Jean Boulin
- Benoît Poelvoorde as Baron Claude Tranchant
- Thierry Lhermitte as Yves Lamarque
- Jérôme Commandeur as Cyril, the cooking chef
- Rossy de Palma as Carmen
- Virginie Hocq as Baroness Éliane Tranchant
- Vincent Desagnat as Andreas Kalamannis
- Nicolas Briançon as Jacques Aziza
- Gérard Depardieu as general police director Maurice Lefranc
- Elisa Bachir Bey as Laura
- Chloé Lambert as Francine Aziza
- Gauthier Battoue as Ben
- Camille Claris as Peggy
- Gil Alma as Gabriel
- Philypa Phoenix as Angela
- Olivier Claverie as Pierre, the doctor
- Jean Dell as Castelli, the car mechanic
- Philippe Dusseau as Jacques Chirac
- Yves Lecoq as Jacques Chirac (voice), Alain Delon (voice)

== Production ==
=== Genesis and development ===
The project began in late 2018, when film director Jean-Marie Poiré had evoked it in the press: "I'm writing a new film and I'd like it to be made", he stated at BFM TV. "It's a comedy with Christian Clavier. It will be a thriller film. I think it will be funny. Talking with Christian, I told him that he had never played a police role. We'll finally be able to discover, I hope so, Christian Clavier as a cop !".

The film was first titled Do you do you Saint-Tropez, in tribute to the film Le gendarme de Saint-Tropez (1964), despite the fact that the song title of the generic is Douliou-douliou Saint-Tropez.

=== Filming ===
Filming took place in the Belgian county of the Walloon Brabant (in the suburb of Brussels) and in the Saint-Tropez gulf (Saint-Tropez, Cavalaire-sur-Mer, Ramatuelle, Gassin)

Two German Spitz dogs, Plume and Lily, participate at the filming, under the direction of the Belgian dog trainer Gaëtan Doppagne, who participated at more than 200 films.

== Information around the film ==
- The vignettes that appear on the windshield of the vehicles are totally fanciful and anachronistic, with the first vignette appearing in 1973, which denotes a singular indigence in directing the film.
