= Freya Mavor =

Scottish actress (born 1993)

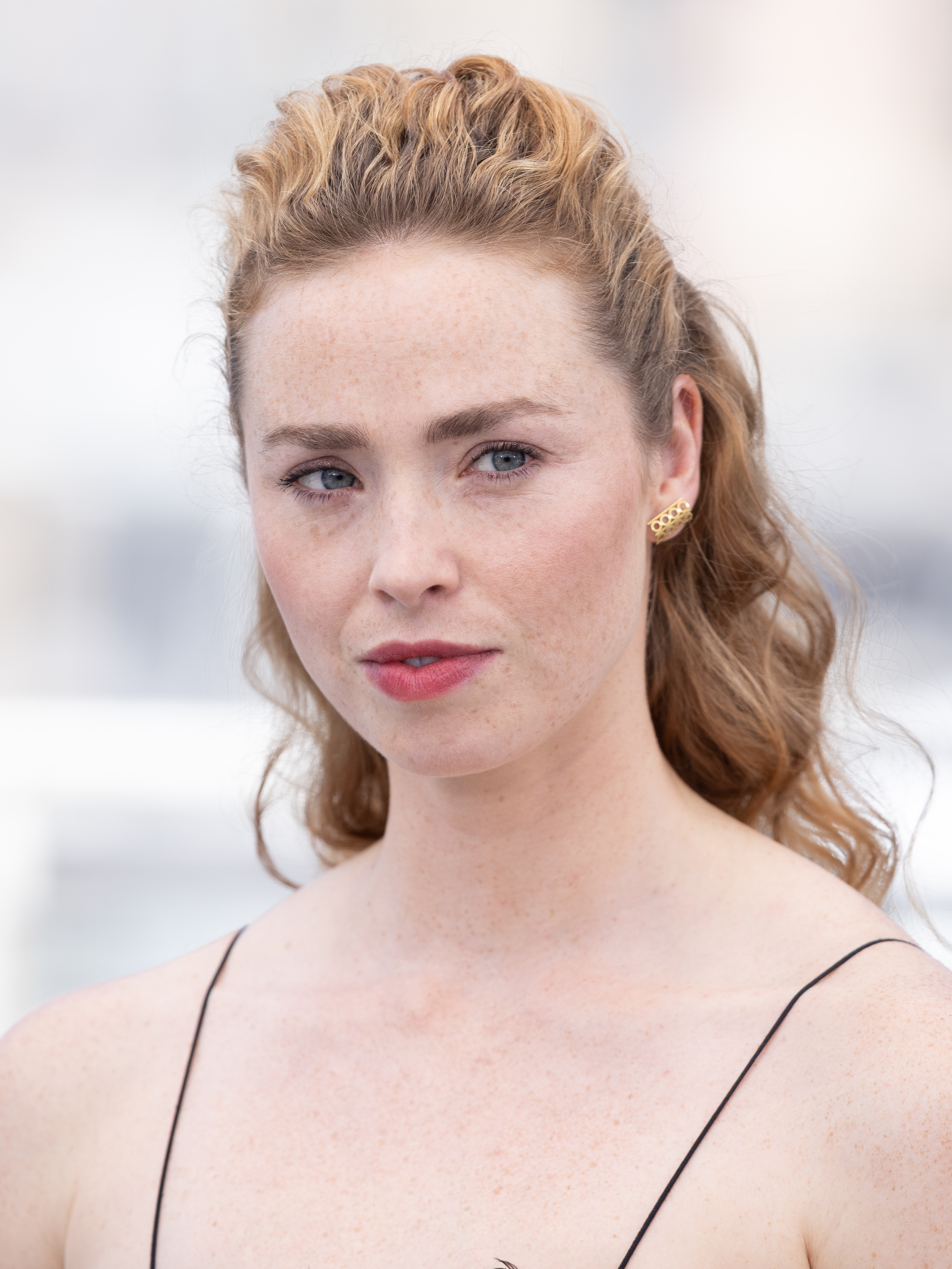
- Mavor at the 2025 Cannes Film Festival
- Born: 13 August 1993 (age 33); Glasgow, Scotland
- Education: Mary Erskine School
- Occupation: Actress
- Years active: 2010–present
- Relatives: James Bridie (great-grandfather)

Freya Mavor (born 13 August 1993) is a Scottish actress. She is best known for her roles as Mini McGuinness in the E4 teen drama Skins and Daria Greenock in the HBO finance drama series Industry.

== Early life ==
Mavor was born in Glasgow, but grew up in Inverleith, Edinburgh. Her father, James Mavor, is a playwright who leads the MA screenwriting course at Napier University. Her grandfather, Ronald Bingo Mavor, was The Scotsman's theatre critic in the early 1960s before he became the director of the Scottish Arts Council. In 1950, her great-grandfather, James Bridie (real name Osborne Mavor), set up a college of drama which was the forerunner of the Royal Scottish Academy of Music and Drama. Mavor's mother is Irish and also has some Danish ancestry. Mavor has two brothers, Hugo and Alex. She can play the piano, and also speaks French.

When she was nine years old, her family moved to La Rochelle, France, where she lived for four years. She studied at Collège Eugène Fromentin in La Rochelle and at Mary Erskine School in Edinburgh, In 2008, she joined the National Youth Theatre. Mavor first became interested in acting after watching The Shining when she was ten years old. Her first acting experience was in school productions of Shakespeare's The Tempest as Miranda and in The Merchant of Venice, directed by John C. Allan, prior to a stint in the National Youth Theatre. In 2005, she was a mezzo-soprano at the National Youth Choir of Scotland.

== Career ==
In 2011, Mavor made her professional debut as Mini McGuinness in the fifth and sixth series of E4 drama Skins. She described her character as "quite a feisty and witty figure, but she doesn't really think about the consequences of her actions". For her role, she was nominated for Best Actress at the TV Choice Awards 2012.

Mavor became the face of Pringle of Scotland for its 2011 spring/summer campaign. She also won the Fashion Icon of the Year Award at the 2011 Scottish Fashion Awards. She was voted 78th in the UK edition of FHM's 100 World's Sexiest Women 2012. In 2013, Screen International named her as one of the UK Stars of Tomorrow.

In 2013, Mavor played Nicola Ball in the romantic comedy Not Another Happy Ending. It was first screened at the 2013 EIFF Closing Night. The film is about a writer suffering from writer's block and her publisher's campaign to get her writing again. In the same year, she appeared as Liz in Sunshine on Leith, an adaptation of the stage musical based on the lyrics of The Proclaimers, first screened at TIFF 2013. In 2015, she starred in Joann Sfar's French-Belgian mystery film The Lady in the Car with Glasses and a Gun alongside Benjamin Biolay and Italian actor Elio Germano. It was the first of a three consecutive French-speaking roles for Mavor, followed in 2016 by supporting roles in both Yvan Attal's satire about antisemitism Ils sont partout and the period drama Cézanne et moi, about the friendship between novelist Émile Zola and painter Paul Cézanne and starring Guillaume Canet and Guillaume Gallienne in the two leading roles.

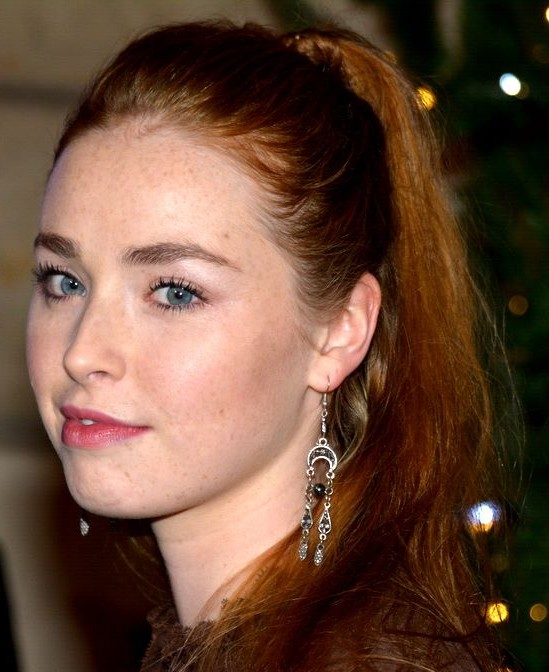
Freya Mavor at the "dîner des révélations des César du cinéma" 2016

On television, Mavor portrayed Princess Elizabeth of York in the 2013 period drama The White Queen for BBC One. Later that year, she joined Will Merrick in stage production Boys at the Arcola Theatre in London. Mavor's next television role was in Channel 4 historical miniseries New Worlds, where she played Jamie Dornan's love interest in a 17th-century story set in England. In May 2014, she appeared in the episode "En apesanteur" ("At zero gravity") of the French TV show Casting(s) by Pierre Niney.

In 2017, Mavor played a supporting role in the mystery drama The Sense of an Ending, starring Jim Broadbent and Charlotte Rampling, then took a leading role in the romance film Modern Life Is Rubbish, which portrays the ups and downs throughout the years of a relationship between a man and a woman who share a passion for alternative rock. In 2018, she had a role in the black comedy Dead in a Week: Or Your Money Back, starring Aneurin Barnard and Tom Wilkinson. The same year she appeared with John Malkovich in the BBC One miniseries The ABC Murders, based on the mystery novel by Agatha Christie; alongside David Kross in the biographical film The Keeper, about the life of German football player Bert Trautmann; and with Vincent Cassel and Olga Kurylenko in another French-language production, L'Empereur de Paris, about early 18th-century French criminalist Eugène François Vidocq, the man who is considered the first private detective.

She played the lead role of Catriona Miller in the 2018 Audible Original audio drama "The Darkwater Bride".

In 2023, Mavor made her directorial debut with the anthology film Kinked. The first chapter is written by Mavor, and stars Thalissa Teixeira, Fehinti Balogun, Skye Lourie, and Talitha Stone.

== Filmography ==
=== Feature films ===
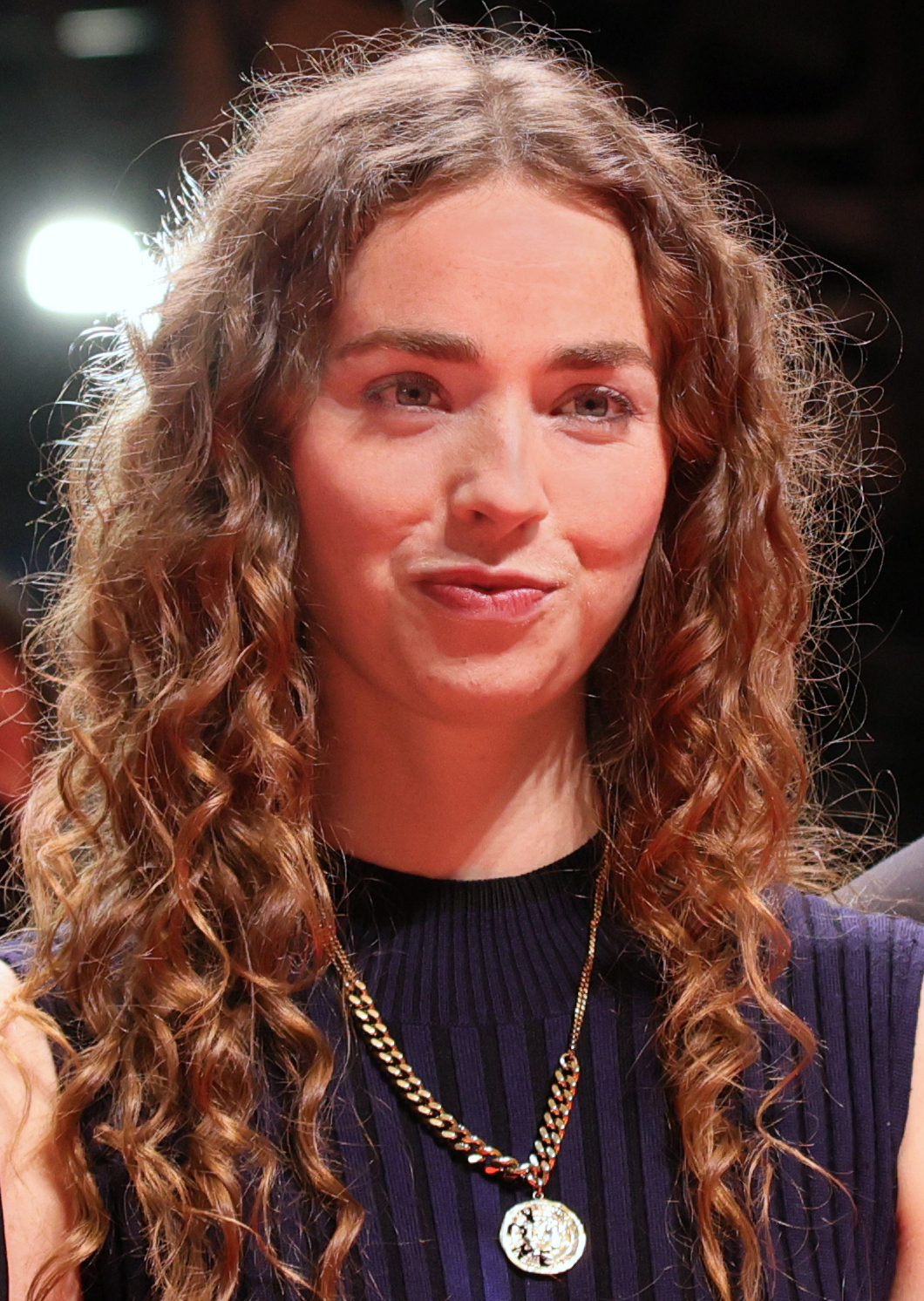
Mavor at the premiere of About Joan 2022

Year	Title	Role	Notes
2013	Not Another Happy Ending	Nicola Ball	
2013	Sunshine on Leith	Liz Henshaw	
2015	The Lady in the Car with Glasses and a Gun	Danielle "Dany" Lang	French-language film
2016	The Jews	Marie	French-language film
2016	Cézanne and I	Jeanne	French-language film
2017	The Sense of an Ending	Young Veronica Ford	
2017	Modern Life Is Rubbish	Natalie	
2018	Dead in a Week or Your Money Back	Ellie	
2018	L'Empereur de Paris	Annette	French-language film
2019	The Keeper	Margaret	
2019	Balance, Not Symmetry	Dolly	
2022	Rogue Agent	Mae Hansen	
2022	About Joan	Joan Verra	French-language film
2022	My Policeman	Julia	
2025	The Residence	Mia White	French-language film
2026	Borges and Me	Ailith	
TBA	Scorn †	TBA	Filming

=== Short films ===
Year	Title	Role	Notes
2011	Disco	Girl in Queue	
2013	Hamburger	Girl	
2017	Winning Marge	Kim	

=== Television ===
Year	Title	Role	Notes
2011–2012	Skins	Mini McGuinness	E4 series, 18 episodes Nominated — TV Choice Award for Best Actress
2013	The White Queen	Princess Elizabeth of York	BBC One miniseries, 3 episodes
2014	New Worlds	Beth Fanshawe	E4 miniseries, 4 episodes
2014	Casting(s)		French-language Canal+ sitcom
2015	Virtuoso	Marie	TV movie directed by Alan Ball
2018	The ABC Murders	Thora Grey	BBC One miniseries, 3 episodes
2019	Twice Upon a Time	Louise	French-language ARTE miniseries, 4 episodes
2020–2024	Industry	Daria Greenock	HBO series, 10 episodes
2025	Marie Antoinette	Jeanne de Valois-Saint-Rémy	BBC series
TBA	Pride and Prejudice	Jane Bennet	6 episodes

=== Stage ===
Year	Title	Role	Notes
2013	Boys	Sophie	Arcola Theatre
2016	Good Canary	Annie Parker	Rose Theatre
