= Heavy Rain =

2010 video game

- European cover art
- Developer: Quantic Dream
- Publishers: Sony Computer Entertainment; Quantic Dream (PC)
- Directors: David Cage; Steve Kniebihly
- Producers: Charles Coutier; Alexandre Plissonneau; Romain Castillos
- Designers: Thierry Flamand; Émilie Ragot
- Programmer: Ronan Marchalot
- Artists: Christophe Brusseaux; Philippe Aballea
- Writer: David Cage
- Composer: Normand Corbeil
- Platforms: PlayStation 3; PlayStation 4; Windows
- Release: 18 February 2010: PlayStation 3; JP: 18 February 2010; NA: 23 February 2010; EU: 24 February 2010; AU: 25 February 2010; UK: 26 February 2010 PlayStation 4; NA: 1 March 2016; PAL: 2 March 2016; UK: 4 March 2016 Windows; WW: 24 June 2019
- Genres: Interactive drama, action-adventure
- Mode: Single-player

Heavy Rain is a 2010 action-adventure video game developed by Quantic Dream and published by Sony Computer Entertainment. The game features four protagonists involved with the mystery of the Origami Killer, a serial killer who uses extended periods of rainfall to drown his victims. The player interacts with the game by performing actions highlighted on screen related to motions on the controller, and in some cases, performing a series of quick time events. The player's choices and actions during the game affect the narrative.

Game developer David Cage wrote the 2,000-page script, acted as director for the four years of development, travelled to Philadelphia to research the setting, and intended to improve upon what was flawed in his 2005 game Fahrenheit. Composer Normand Corbeil wrote the score, which was recorded at Abbey Road Studios. The game was released for PlayStation 3 in February 2010, PlayStation 4 in 2016, and Windows in 2019. A critical and commercial success, Heavy Rain is considered one of the best video games ever made, receiving praise for its emotional impact, visuals, writing, controls, and music, though some critics faulted the controls, voice acting, and plot inconsistencies. It sold 5.3 million units by January 2018.

== Gameplay ==
Button-prompts are used to interact with the environment.

Heavy Rain is an interactive drama and action-adventure game in which the player controls four different characters from a third-person perspective. Each playable character may die depending on the player's actions, which create a branching storyline; in these cases, the player is faced with quick time events. The game is divided into multiple scenes, each centering on one of the characters.

Holding down R2 moves the character forward and the left analogue stick controls the direction. Interaction with the environment is done by pressing on-screen, context-sensitive prompts, using the right analogue stick, and performing Sixaxis control movements with the DualShock 3 or 4. Also featured are difficulty levels that the player can change at any point during the game. A chapter-select screen offers the function of playing scenes over again. With PlayStation Move, the player wields either the motion and navigation controllers, or the DualShock and motion controllers.

== Plot ==
The day after celebrating his son Jason's tenth birthday, Ethan Mars (Pascal Langdale) and his family go shopping. Jason and Ethan are hit by a car; Jason dies, and Ethan falls into a six-month coma. After he wakes from the coma, Ethan, blaming himself for Jason's death, separates from his wife Grace and moves into a small suburban duplex while experiencing mental trauma and blackouts. Two years later, Ethan blacks out at the park with his other son Shaun. When he wakes up, he discovers that Shaun has been kidnapped by the "Origami Killer", a serial killer whose modus operandi consists of abducting young boys during the fall season, drowning them in rainwater, and leaving an orchid on their chests and an origami figure nearby. Norman Jayden (Leon Ockenden), an FBI profiler struggling with addiction to a drug called Triptocaine, investigates the death of another Origami Killer victim and concludes that he died the same day as a violent rainstorm, which flooded the cell where he was kept. He estimates that Shaun has only three days to live based on weather patterns.

Besieged by reporters, Ethan checks into a motel. He receives a letter from the killer, which leads to a shoebox containing a mobile phone, a handgun, and five origami figures. The killer calls him and explains that each figure contains instructions on completing tests that will determine how much Ethan loves his son. Every time he completes one, he will receive a piece of the address where Shaun is held. The tests include driving against traffic at speed on the highway, crawling through broken glass and active electrical pylons, cutting off one of his fingers, murdering drug dealer Brad Silver, and drinking poison on camera. Ethan meets Madison Paige (Jacqui Ainsley/Judi Beecher), (Note: Ainsley is the physical model for Madison and Beecher voices the character.) a journalist who sometimes uses the motel to deal with her insomnia. She decides to conduct her own investigation into the Origami Killer. Jayden and his partner Lieutenant Carter Blake investigate suspects, but nothing pans out until Grace arrives at the station, fearing that her estranged husband is involved in Shaun's disappearance. After Ethan's psychiatrist, Clarence Dupré, reveals that his patient has a history of blackouts, Blake and his superiors put out a warrant for his arrest. Unconvinced, Jayden continues to investigate other leads.

Meanwhile, private investigator Scott Shelby (Sam Douglas) meets the families of the Origami Killer's victims, collecting the letters and other items they received when their loved ones were abducted. Prostitute Lauren Winter, a victim's mother, persuades Scott to let her accompany him. Their investigation leads them to Gordi Kramer, who claims to be the killer, but when they attempt to question him, they are knocked out and wake up in a car sinking to the bottom of a lake. After either saving or failing to rescue Lauren, Scott tracks down Gordi's father, Charles, and forces him to confess that his son was responsible for an earlier incident in which a boy was killed.

=== Endings ===
Throughout the game, the player experiences two separate flashbacks that reveal the true nature of the Origami Killer. The first occurs 34 years earlier, with twin brothers playing on a construction site after being forced out of their trailer by their abusive alcoholic father. One of the two, John Sheppard, falls into a broken pipe and gets his leg trapped just as a rainstorm causes the pipe to begin filling with water. The second occurs shortly after, with John's brother running home to warn their father, only to find him too drunk to help. Scared and confused, the boy could only watch helplessly as his brother drowned. Thus, the Origami Killer was born: a killer who searches for a father willing to sacrifice himself. He kills his victims the same way his brother died. The boy is revealed to be Scott, who was adopted soon after his brother's death. His actions as an investigator are not meant to get justice for his victims; instead, he needs to collect the evidence of his crimes, which he later burns in his office wastebasket.

Ethan, Madison, and Norman all have the opportunity to find the warehouse where Shaun is, rescue him, and stop Scott. Ethan can arrive through his trials, Madison must survive and find the address in the killer's apartment, and Norman must survive and pinpoint the warehouse's location by using ARI to analyze the evidence he finds. If Ethan goes alone, he will save Shaun and either spare or kill Scott. Regardless of what he does, he will be shot dead by the police when he tries to escape. If all three make it, Ethan and Madison will have to save Shaun while Norman deals with Scott. If Ethan fails to arrive, Madison will fight Scott while Norman saves Shaun; if Norman does not come, Madison will perform the rescue. Once the chapter is complete, the player will learn what happened to the characters. Each ending is determined by what occurred in the final chapter. The most positive shows Ethan and his son starting a new life with Madison, Norman retiring from the FBI to focus on treating his addiction or being hailed as a hero for saving Shaun, and Lauren spitting on Scott's grave after cursing his memory. The most negative sees Madison and Shaun dead, Norman overdosing on Triptocaine over the guilt of not saving Shaun, and Ethan being successfully framed as the Origami Killer by Blake. At the same time, Scott escapes and remains at large if Lauren dies. Giving in to his pain, Ethan dies by suicide in his cell.

== Development ==
Prior to Sony's involvement, the game was pitched to Microsoft, which rejected it for its themes of child abduction. At E3 2006, developer Quantic Dream revealed "Heavy Rain: The Casting", a tech demo running on the PlayStation 3. It was created in less than three months, including the game engine, script, casting, motion capture, and R&D. The demo, though not intended for the public eye, made its appearance at Sony's behest. Impressed by actress Aurélie Bancilhon's performances, writer and director David Cage gave her the part of Lauren Winter.

Taking over four years to make, it had a development, marketing, and distribution budget of €40 million, and a 2,000-page long script. Heavy Rain required 170 days of shooting, more than seventy actors and stuntmen, and sixty additional days to animate the faces of fifty actors. It had also sixty sets and 30,000 animations. Guillaume de Fondaumière (CFO of Quantic Dream) claimed it was the most ambitious motion capture project for a game yet. The beginning of the game was inspired by an incident where Cage briefly lost his son in a mall, which made him reflect on "what it means to love your son"; this led to the tagline "How far are you prepared to go to save someone you love?" Cage structured the game like a film, and wanted to solve the frustration he had with the "game over" message by allowing the story to continue after the death of a playable character. Each character was made to look like their actor counterpart; Madison Paige was modelled after Jacqui Ainsley, who also offered body motion capture and her likeness, while Judi Beecher provided the voice and facial motion capture. To keep the game from being boring, scenes were intentionally short. The user interface was done with Omegame Menus Master. The quick-time event system was based on that of Shenmue. The first design for Heavy Rain was a makeshift motion controller, ultimately not thought feasible at the time. Different difficulty levels were implemented to appeal to a broader sample of players.

Cage's intention with Heavy Rain was to continue the interactive storytelling and rectify the flaws of Fahrenheit. Though the game is set in a nameless city, he conducted field research in Philadelphia and hired a location scout who worked on the film of the same name, asking to be escorted to poor areas where he could speak to locals, take pictures, and film. Cage was struck by the despondency he found there and incorporated the presence of large factories near houses into the game. His inspiration included art of many kinds, but came mostly from real life. Cage researched serial killers by reading books, deciding the modus operandi and background of the Origami Killer. He based the finger amputation scene on a childhood accident.

Normand Corbeil, who previously worked with Cage on Fahrenheit, was chosen as the composer for Heavy Rain. He was given two months from 5 June 2009 to do everything. Corbeil was instructed by the director on the importance of representing the characters' points of view, leading him to employ the piano for Ethan Mars, a chamber orchestra for Madison Paige, a symphony orchestra for Norman Jayden, and brass and flutes for Scott Shelby. Recording at Abbey Road Studios, the composer delivered nearly 300 cues and played the piano himself.

== Release ==
Heavy Rain became a PlayStation 3 exclusive, following development for Xbox 360 and Windows having stalled in 2006. Having first been scheduled for a late 2008 release, it was delayed to 23 February 2010 in North America, 24 February in Europe, 25 February in Australia and New Zealand, and 26 February in the United Kingdom and Ireland. Leading up to the release was an Internet-based viral marketing campaign that involved people in finding four pieces of evidence concerning a serial killer, and in the end being rewarded the game demo (before it released on 11 February). Heavy Rain Edition Modifiée, a modified version released in France in 2011, was aimed toward a younger audience. Quantic Dream later announced that a remaster of Heavy Rain would be released for PlayStation 4 on 1 March 2016 in North America via PlayStation Network, followed by physical versions on 2 March in Europe, Australia and New Zealand, and on 4 March in the United Kingdom. That same month, it was released with Quantic Dream's next game Beyond: Two Souls as The Heavy Rain & Beyond: Two Souls Collection. It was included on PlayStation Plus for the month of July 2018. During the March 2019 Game Developers Conference, it was announced that Quantic Dream would publish Heavy Rain along with Beyond: Two Souls and Detroit: Become Human for Windows. Exclusively available for one year on the Epic Games Store, they were self-published by Quantic Dream on 24 June 2019.

The Heavy Rain Chronicles, initially planned as downloadable content with multiple scenes, only produced one featuring Madison Paige called The Taxidermist, first showcased at E3 2008. The rest were cancelled due to the PlayStation Move edition, which was released in October 2010, and included The Taxidermist, three dynamic themes, the soundtrack, and nine making-of videos. The slipcased collector's edition has the same content as the Move edition, excluding two themes, the making-of videos, and Move support.

== Reception ==
Reception

Aggregate score
| Aggregator | Score |
|---|---|
| Metacritic | PS3: 87/100; PS4: 78/100; PC: 75/100 |

Review scores
| Publication | Score |
|---|---|
| 1Up.com | A− |
| Edge | 7/10 |
| Eurogamer | 9/10 |
| Game Informer | 9.5/10 |
| GameSpot | 8.5/10 |
| GameSpy | 4.5/5 |
| IGN | 9/10 |

Heavy Rain is considered one of the best video games of all time, (Note: Attributed to multiple references:) and was included in the book 1001 Video Games You Must Play Before You Die. Metacritic reported that critical reception consisted of "generally favorable reviews". Out of a focus group of seventy, it was determined that none had assessed who the killer was before the game revealed it.

David Ellis of 1UP.com praised the quality and detail of the sets as "spectacular", noting that the world felt "lived-in and genuine"; the characters were said to have a similar "gritty realness". Ellis' view was that the game relayed an emotional subtlety that "very few games have ever succeeded at", and that knowing the characters bore potentially fatal outcomes added "a stressful layer" to an otherwise tense experience. Edge staff complimented Heavy Rain on its unmatched "compulsive pull", writing that the "gruesome curiosity" of the challenges was reminiscent to that of the Saw franchise. The realism, "aptly conjured" with quality lighting, and "filmic cliché", only considered effective for its sparse use, were observed as treading a "fine line". Eurogamer's Tom Bramwell saw the writing as full of "compassion and bravery" and commented that it was a game "where pulling the trigger makes you really feel something". Joe Juba at Game Informer commended the "astounding detail" and computer facial animation of the characters. Juba enjoyed the "moody musical score" as well as the voice actors, some of whom he called "exceptional". Declaring the game a "masterpiece", he also praised the storytelling and character development for demonstrating the "untapped potential" of interactive entertainment. The controls were lauded for contributing to the more poignant scenes. Lark Anderson, writing for GameSpot, termed Heavy Rain an "absorbing experience" that showed, in meticulous fashion, the characters' tension, urgency, surprise, and tragedy. Like Juba, he liked how the controls lent themselves to developing the emotional states of the characters. The story, Anderson felt, was its greatest strength, complemented by "outstanding" visual design and "hyperrealistic" character models. The orchestral score and "mostly great voice acting" were also subject to approval. Anthony Gallegos from GameSpy stated that Heavy Rain had produced "the most intense emotional experience I've had with a controller in my hand". Gallegos said the quick time events were of intuitive value and gave credit to Quantic Dream for making "incredible-looking character models". Chris Roper of IGN found the control mechanics praiseworthy, citing the choice and influence of the button prompts as a "key element" to how it distinguished itself from other games. He admired the main characters for being well developed, interesting, and integral to the story. The script was dubbed "easily amongst the best" among games.

Conversely, Ellis thought the "cumbersome" control scheme was the least appealing aspect, a complaint repeated by Edge staff, who also found the scene structure to be confusing. Bramwell mentioned that the writing occasionally lacked "poetry or restraint", noticing a trend of clichés in the dialogue as well as broken English from the voice actors. In agreement with Edge staff and Bramwell, Juba indicated plot holes within the story and poorly articulated voice acting. Anderson concurred, accusing the narrative inconsistencies of reducing the immersion. The control system was perceived as "clumsy and imprecise". Despite the realistic character models, Gallegos acknowledged a sense of unease evoked by the uncanny valley. Roper disparaged the graphics of clothes, hands, and objects for not being as detailed as hoped, and followed in the view that non-American accents from American characters sounded "weird".

=== Sales and accolades ===
Heavy Rain debuted in Japan in sixth place, selling 27,000 units, and topped the UK charts the same week. According to The NPD Group, it was the tenth best-selling retail game of February, with over 219,000 units sold. Two months later, it had passed one million sales, outperforming Cage's pre-release estimate of 200,000 to 300,000. By August 2013, the game had sold three million copies, which rose to 4.5 in 2017 and 5.3 in 2018 in collective sales on PlayStation 3 and 4. It is one of the best-selling PlayStation 3 video games, with Sony profiting over €100 million from it.

At E3 2009, Heavy Rain won GameSpot's Best Adventure Game award and was a finalist for Game of the Show, Best PS3 Game, and Best Graphics. It was a runner-up for Best of E3 PS3 Game at 1UP.com, and nominated for PS3 Game and Adventure Game of Show at GameSpy. The Game Critics Awards nominated it for Best Original Game. GameSpy declared it Adventure Game and PlayStation 3 Game of the year; IGN placed it in the latter category. In 2011, Adventure Gamers named Heavy Rain the 26th best adventure game. IGN later ranked the game as one of the best of the generation, while Empire listed it among the greatest of all time.

| Year | Award | Category | Recipient(s) and nominee(s) | Result | Ref. |
|---|---|---|---|---|---|
| 2010 | Develop Awards | Best New IP | Heavy Rain | Won | |
| 2010 | European Games Award | Best European Adventure | Heavy Rain | Won | |
| 2010 | Japan Game Awards | Game Designers Award | Heavy Rain | Won | |
| 2010 | Golden Joystick Awards | Action/Adventure Game Of The Year | Heavy Rain | Nominated | |
| 2010 | Golden Joystick Awards | Soundtrack Of The Year | Heavy Rain | Nominated | |
| 2010 | Golden Joystick Awards | Ultimate Game of the Year | Heavy Rain | Nominated | |
| 2010 | Spike Video Game Awards | Best PS3 Game | Heavy Rain | Nominated | |
| 2010 | Spike Video Game Awards | Best Graphics | Heavy Rain | Nominated | |
| 2011 | 38th Annie Awards | Best Animated Video Game | Heavy Rain | Nominated | |
| 2011 | 7th British Academy Video Games Awards | Best Game | Heavy Rain | Nominated | |
| 2011 | 7th British Academy Video Games Awards | Gameplay | Heavy Rain | Nominated | |
| 2011 | 7th British Academy Video Games Awards | Technical Innovation | Heavy Rain | Won | |
| 2011 | 7th British Academy Video Games Awards | Original Music | Heavy Rain | Won | |
| 2011 | 7th British Academy Video Games Awards | Story | Heavy Rain | Won | |
| 2011 | 7th British Academy Video Games Awards | GAME Award of 2010 | Heavy Rain | Nominated | |
| 2011 | 9th Annual G.A.N.G. Awards | Audio of the Year | Heavy Rain | Nominated | |
| 2011 | 9th Annual G.A.N.G. Awards | Music of the Year | Heavy Rain | Nominated | |
| 2011 | 9th Annual G.A.N.G. Awards | Best Interactive Score | Heavy Rain | Nominated | |
| 2011 | 9th Annual G.A.N.G. Awards | Best Original Instrumental Song | "Ethan Mars Theme" | Nominated | |
| 2011 | 10th Annual National Academy of Video Game Trade Reviewers Awards | Game of the Year | Heavy Rain | Nominated | |
| 2011 | 10th Annual National Academy of Video Game Trade Reviewers Awards | Animation | Heavy Rain | Nominated | |
| 2011 | 10th Annual National Academy of Video Game Trade Reviewers Awards | Art Direction, Contemporary | Heavy Rain | Nominated | |
| 2011 | 10th Annual National Academy of Video Game Trade Reviewers Awards | Camera Direction in a Game Engine | Heavy Rain | Nominated | |
| 2011 | 10th Annual National Academy of Video Game Trade Reviewers Awards | Character Design | Heavy Rain | Nominated | |
| 2011 | 10th Annual National Academy of Video Game Trade Reviewers Awards | Control Design, 3D | Heavy Rain | Nominated | |
| 2011 | 10th Annual National Academy of Video Game Trade Reviewers Awards | Direction in a Game Cinema | Heavy Rain | Won | |
| 2011 | 10th Annual National Academy of Video Game Trade Reviewers Awards | Game Design, New IP | Heavy Rain | Won | |
| 2011 | 10th Annual National Academy of Video Game Trade Reviewers Awards | Graphics/Technical | Heavy Rain | Nominated | |
| 2011 | 10th Annual National Academy of Video Game Trade Reviewers Awards | Innovation in Gameplay | Heavy Rain | Won | |
| 2011 | 10th Annual National Academy of Video Game Trade Reviewers Awards | Innovation in Game Technology | Heavy Rain | Nominated | |
| 2011 | 10th Annual National Academy of Video Game Trade Reviewers Awards | Lead Performance in a Drama | Pascal Langdale as Ethan Mars | Nominated | |
| 2011 | 10th Annual National Academy of Video Game Trade Reviewers Awards | Lighting/Texturing | Heavy Rain | Won | |
| 2011 | 10th Annual National Academy of Video Game Trade Reviewers Awards | Original Dramatic Score, New IP | Heavy Rain | Nominated | |
| 2011 | 10th Annual National Academy of Video Game Trade Reviewers Awards | Supporting Performance in a Drama | Sam Douglas as Scott Shelby | Nominated | |
| 2011 | 10th Annual National Academy of Video Game Trade Reviewers Awards | Use of Sound | Heavy Rain | Nominated | |
| 2011 | 10th Annual National Academy of Video Game Trade Reviewers Awards | Writing in a Drama | Heavy Rain | Nominated | |
| 2011 | 10th Annual National Academy of Video Game Trade Reviewers Awards | Game, Original Adventure | Heavy Rain | Won | |
| 2011 | 11th Annual Game Developers Choice Awards | Best Writing | Heavy Rain | Nominated | |
| 2011 | 11th Annual Game Developers Choice Awards | Best Technology | Heavy Rain | Nominated | |
| 2011 | 11th Annual Game Developers Choice Awards | Innovation Award | Heavy Rain | Nominated | |
| 2011 | 14th Annual Interactive Achievement Awards | Outstanding Achievement in Visual Engineering | Heavy Rain | Won | |
| 2011 | 14th Annual Interactive Achievement Awards | Outstanding Innovation in Gaming | Heavy Rain | Won | |
| 2011 | 14th Annual Interactive Achievement Awards | Outstanding Achievement in Original Music Composition | Heavy Rain | Won | |
| 2011 | 14th Annual Interactive Achievement Awards | Adventure Game of the Year | Heavy Rain | Nominated | |
| 2011 | 14th Annual Interactive Achievement Awards | Outstanding Achievement in Story | Heavy Rain | Nominated | |

== Film adaptation ==
On 15 May 2006, the rights to make Heavy Rain into a film were optioned by New Line Cinema, just after the reveal of "Heavy Rain: The Casting." These were later auctioned off to Unique Features, a production company formed by two former New Line executives, Bob Shaye and Michael Lynne. Shaye and Lynne purchased the film rights with their own funds despite having a "first-look deal" in place at Warner Bros., which had bought New Line prior to their departure. David Milch, writer for NYPD Blue and Deadwood, was slated to adapt it under the title Rain.
