= Welcome to the Sticks =

2008 French comedy film by Dany Boon

- Film poster
- Directed by: Dany Boon
- Written by: Dany Boon; Alexandre Charlot; Franck Magnier
- Produced by: Claude Berri; Jérôme Seydoux
- Starring: Kad Merad; Dany Boon; Zoé Félix
- Music by: Philippe Rombi
- Production companies: Pathé; Hirsch; Les Productions du Ch'Timi; TF1 Films Production; Solidaris; Les Productions du Chicon
- Distributed by: Pathé Distribution
- Release date: 20 February 2008
- Running time: 106 minutes
- Country: France
- Languages: French; Ch'ti
- Budget: $14.4 million
- Box office: $245.1 million

Welcome to the Sticks (French: Bienvenue chez les Ch'tis, (Note: The French word Ch'ti is slang for someone from Northern France. See Picard language.) French pronunciation: [bjɛ̃vny ʃe lɛ ʃti]) is a 2008 French comedy film directed and co-written by Dany Boon and starring Kad Merad and Boon himself. The film is the highest-grossing French film of all time at the box office in France.

== Plot ==
Philippe Abrams is the manager of the French post office (La Poste) branch in Salon-de-Provence, Bouches-du-Rhône, in southern France. He is married to Julie, whose negative character makes his life miserable. Philippe does everything to get a job at an office in Sanary-sur-Mer, on the Mediterranean coast, to make her happy. As it is perceived that the position will be acquired more easily if one is disabled, Abrams pretends that he is disabled—and is found out by the management. As punishment, he is banished for two years to Bergues, a town near Dunkirk in northern France. Northern France—and the Nord-Pas-de-Calais region in particular—is considered "the sticks"—a cold and rainy place inhabited by unsophisticated ch'tis who speak a strange dialect (called "ch'ti" in local parlance, and pronounced "cheutimi" in the South). He has to spend his first night at the home of Antoine, a member of his staff who happens to live there. Philippe initially dislikes Antoine for his obnoxious behavior and because he initially thinks Antoine is gay (due to seeing pictures of him crossdressing), but later Philippe finds out that Antoine worked for a carnival for a time (where he did impressions of numerous people, men and women alike) and that he secretly has a crush on Annabelle, one of the workers at the post office. Antoine and Philippe subsequently become best friends.

To Philippe's surprise, Bergues proves to be a charming place teeming with warm, friendly people and co-workers. Soon, he is completely won over, eating strong-smelling Maroilles cheese; talking to virtually every local (by delivering their mail, and accepting the recipients' invitation for a drink); playing at the beach; playing the carillon at the bell tower together, drinking beer like a local, going to an RC Lens football match and so forth. He tries to describe the happy turn of events to his wife who has remained in the South with their young son, but she does not believe him. This inspires Philippe to tell her what she wants to believe; that his life is wretched there.

Everything goes fine until Julie decides to join him in the North to relieve his gloom. Philippe is forced to confess to his new friends and colleagues that he has described them as barbarians to his wife. First, they are angry, but they then decide to help him by behaving as such to cover for his lies and to scare Julie so she will depart quickly. They also let her stay in the old mining village near Bergues, pretending it is the main town. Julie has a very bad weekend, but decides she will move to Bergues to stay with Philippe, to be supportive.

Just when she's ready to go back south, she discovers that she has been tricked when a local tells Julie that the actual town of Bergues is several kilometers away. When Philippe finds Julie at his real Bergues home, he tells her the truth about the happiness and friendship that the town has brought him. Julie is disappointed at first, but after realising her husband is happy, she decides to move north to be with him.

Meanwhile, Antoine and Annabelle had been dating for over a year, but had broken up due to Antoine's passiveness towards his overbearing mother. Despite their split, Antoine still has feelings for Annabelle, who now has a new boyfriend. Upon learning this, Antoine cheers himself up by drinking alcohol during his work hours and behaves in an erratic manner. When Philippe urges Antoine to take courage and be assertive, Antoine finally confesses to his mother that he loves Annabelle and is planning to move to a new place with her. Unexpectedly, his mother is happy about it—she has waited all these years for Antoine to stand up for himself. As a result, Antoine proposes to Annabelle by the bell tower when it is playing a Stevie Wonder song. Annabelle accepts, and they get married.

Three years later, Philippe receives a transfer to move to Porquerolles on the Mediterranean coast. Accepting the offer, Philippe and his family move south. Just as he is about to say goodbye, he is reduced to tears, proving Antoine's theory on the Ch'tis proverb ("A visitor brays [cries] twice up north; once on their arrival and once at their departure").

== Cast ==
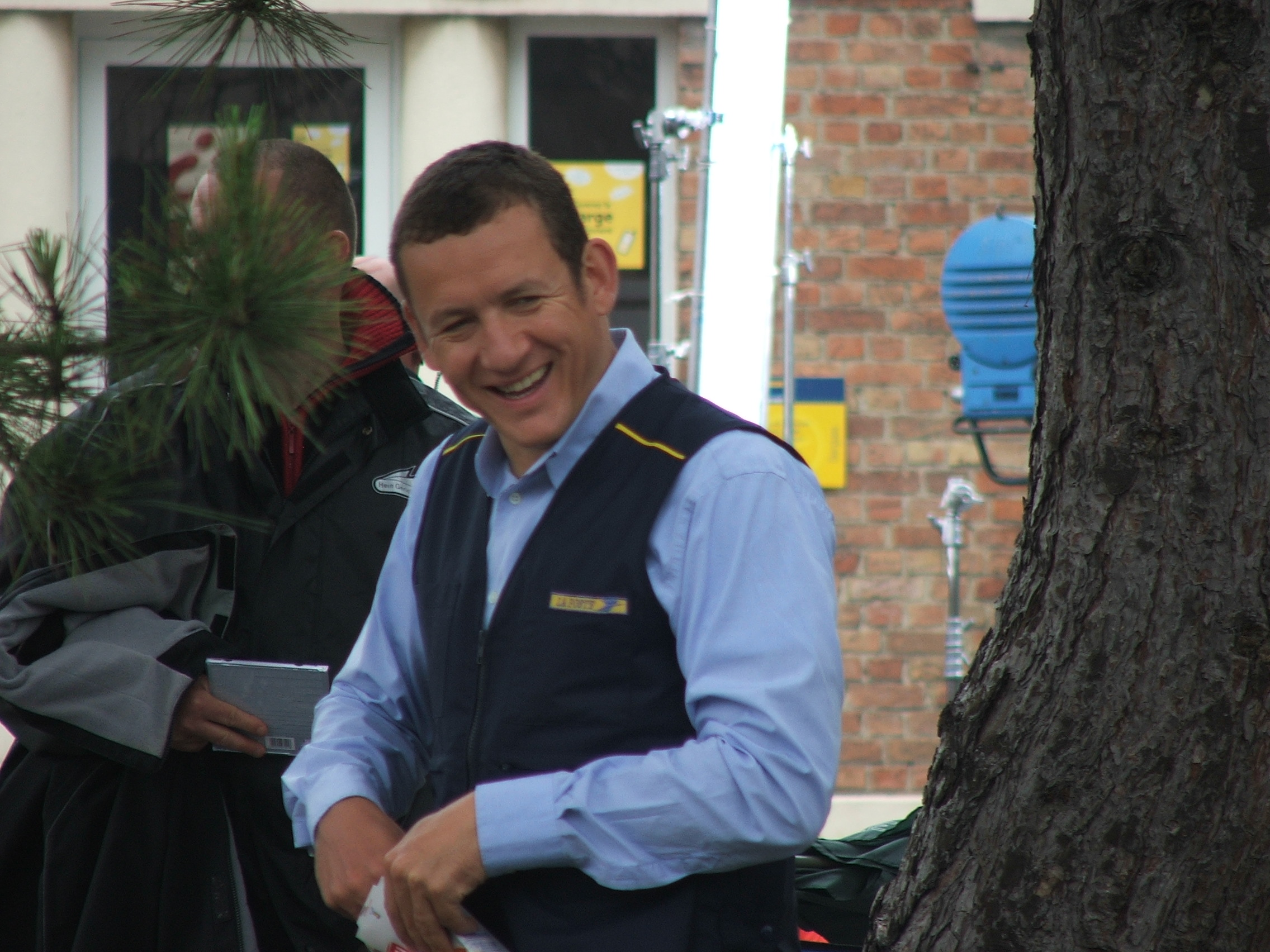
Dany Boon during the filming in Bergues

- Kad Merad as Philippe Abrams, Head of the local post office
- Dany Boon as Antoine Bailleul, postman and carillon performer
- Zoé Félix as Julie, spouse of Philippe Abrams
- Lorenzo Ausilia-Foret as Raphaël Abrams
- Anne Marivin as Annabelle Deconninck
- Philippe Duquesne as Fabrice Canoli
- Guy Lecluyse as Yann Vandernoout
- Patrick Bosso as Policeman on A7
- Zinedine Soualem as Momo
- Jérôme Commandeur as Inspector Lebic
- Line Renaud as Antoine's mother
- Michel Galabru as Julie's uncle
- Stéphane Freiss as Jean
- Alexandre Carrière as Tony
- Jenny Clève as The old lady who sings the P'tit quinquin (Northern French hymn)
- Fred Personne as M. Vasseur
- Nadège Beausson-Diagne as The employee

== Reception ==
The film received generally positive reviews, with 6 out of 9 reviews on Rotten Tomatoes being positive. The film has grossed US$192,928,551 in the box office in France alone.

== Awards and nominations ==
- César Awards: nominated for Best Original Screenplay (Maxime Quoilin)
- European Film Awards: nominated for Audience Award of the Best Film
- London's Favourite French Film 2008: Best Film Award

== Remakes ==
An Italian remake, Benvenuti al Sud ("Welcome to the South"), was produced and released by Medusa Film in 2010. The plot was similar to the original: Alberto (Claudio Bisio), the manager of a Poste Italiane office in Lombardy is banished for two years to Castellabate, a small town in Campania. Dany Boon appeared in a cameo. Unlike the French original, the Italian franchise led to a sequel: Benvenuti al Nord ("Welcome to the North"; 2012).

In 2017, the Dutch remake Weg van jou (a play on words that both means 'away from you' and 'smitten with you') ran in Dutch theatres. In this remake, city slicker Evi gets relocated from metropolitan and cosmopolitan Rotterdam to the rural Dutch province of Zeeland. In Zeeland, while away from her stuck-up boyfriend, she gets smitten with a local man.

Negotiations regarding a proposed English version of the film were officially abandoned in 2015. As early as 2008, Will Smith was negotiating with Dany Boon regarding a remake; the US film was to be called Welcome to the Sticks. While few other details were revealed, there were suggestions that the plot would revolve around a multinational company, rather than US Mail.

A Mexican remake, Welcome al Norte ("Welcome to the North"), was released in 2023.

== Soundtrack ==
The CD soundtrack, including the scores of La Maison du Bonheur and Nothing to Declare, were all composed by Philippe Rombi.
