= Nothing to Declare (film) =

- Directed by: Dany Boon
- Written by: Dany Boon
- Produced by: Les Productions du Chicon; Éric Hubert
- Starring: Benoît Poelvoorde; Dany Boon
- Cinematography: Pierre Aïm
- Edited by: Luc Barnier; Géraldine Rétif
- Music by: Philippe Rombi
- Distributed by: Pathé Distribution (France); Paradiso Filmed Entertainment (Belgium)
- Release dates: 15 December 2010 (Angers premiere); 26 January 2011 (France)
- Running time: 108 minutes
- Countries: France; Belgium
- Language: French
- Budget: $28 million
- Box office: $93.8 million

Nothing to Declare (French: Rien à déclarer) is a 2010 Franco-Belgian comedy film, written and directed by Dany Boon.

== Plot ==
On 1 January 1993, two customs officers, one Belgian and the other French, have to deal with closure of their small customs post situated in the middle of the small village of "Courquain" (French) or "Koorkin" (Belgian).

Both a hereditary Francophobe and an over-zealous Belgian customs officer, Ruben Vandevoorde is forced to join the first Franco-Belgian mobile squad. The first French volunteer for the squad is Mathias Ducatel, Vandervoorde's personal bête noire. He does this because he has fallen in love with Vandevoorde's sister Louise, and is afraid to unveil their love because of the trouble it will cause within her family.

Meanwhile, in an effort to raise money for the restaurant No Man's Land during the transition to the Schengen Agreement, Jacques and Irene are hired by a drug trafficker named Duval to pass along information concerning the mobile squad's checkpoints. Unfortunately, the information is rendered useless as Duval's accomplice Tiburce hilariously fails to avoid customs and ends up in jail.

In their pursuit of the drug trafficker, Vandevoorde and Ducatel become close, at first because the priest tells Vandevoorde that his hatred towards the French will lead him straight to hell. But soon, Vandevoorde really starts to think of Ducatel as a good friend until he finds out that Ducatel has been seeing his sister in secret for a year. At that point, he pulls out his gun and tries to shoot Ducatel but his sister stops him, because she loves him.

In the end, Vandevoorde accepts them as a couple but remains a xenophobe and the audience is left in the dark about whether the father, who is much more of a Francophobe, accepts them or not.

== Cast ==
- Benoît Poelvoorde: Ruben Vandevoorde
- Dany Boon: Mathias Ducatel
- Karin Viard: Irène Janus
- François Damiens: Jacques Janus
- Julie Bernard: Louise Vandevoorde
- Eric Godon: Chief Willems
- Zinedine Soualem: Lucas Pozzi
- Bruno Lochet: Tiburce
- Nadège Beausson-Diagne: Nadia Bakari
- Philippe Magnan: Mercier
- Guy Lecluyse: Grégory Brioul
- Laurent Gamelon: Duval
- David Coudyser: the country driver
- Jérôme Commandeur: the French driver
- Bouli Lanners: Bruno Vanuxem
- Jean-Luc Couchard: Brother Vanuxem
- Olivier Gourmet: the priest from Chimay
- Bruno Moynot: the estate agent
- Jean-Paul Dermont: Father Vandevoorde
- Laurent Capelluto: the Russian
- Chritel Pedrinelli: Olivia Vandevoorde
- Joachim Ledeganck: Léopold Vandevoorde
- Sylviane Alliet: "No Man's Land" client

== Production ==
In an interview with ClapVideo, Dany Boon says that he wrote this film because he wanted to create something as strong as Welcome to the Sticks (French title: Bienvenue chez les Ch'tis). He was inspired by the fact that "we're all a stranger to someone", and that "we all experience some futile rejection that lead us to do stupid things". He also took inspiration of his parents' relationship and transformed it into the love story between Mathias Ducatel and Louise Vandevoorde.

== Reception ==
=== Box office ===
According to Pathé the film sold 48,155 tickets in the Nord-Pas-de-Calais on the opening night, the biggest film success in the region since Bienvenue chez les Ch'tis.

=== Critical response ===
One of the major themes of the movie is how the European Union's vision of Europe may be good in theory but in practice can be damaging to the local economy in the border regions.

Critical reception of this film has been generally mixed. AlloCiné has given the film 2.5 out of 5. Rotten Tomatoes lists two reviews from critics, one positive, one negative.
