= Dany Boon =

French comedian and filmmaker (born 1966)

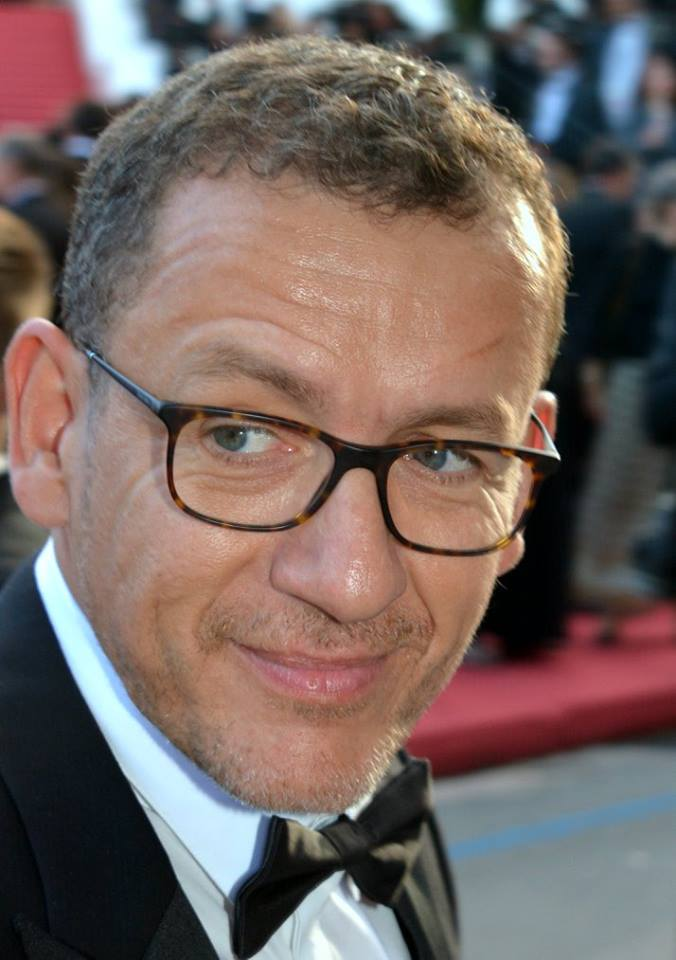
- Boon in 2018
- Born: Daniel Farid Hamidou; 26 June 1966 (age 60); Armentières, Hauts-de-France, France
- Occupations: Actor, film director, omedian, screenwriter, producer
- Years active: 1992–present
- Spouses: Judith Godrèche (m. 1998; div. 2002) Yaël Harris (m. 2003; div. 2018)
- Partner: Laurence Arné (2018–2025)
- Children: 5

Dany Boon (pronounced [dani bun]; born Daniel Farid Hamidou on 26 June 1966) is a French actor, comedian, film director, screenwriter and producer.

Starting as a stand-up comedian during the 1990s, he found success in 2008 as an actor and director in the comedy Welcome to the Sticks. Since then, he has been involved as a screenwriter, director or both in the films Nothing to Declare (2011), Supercondriaque (2014), Raid dingue (2017), La Ch'tite famille (2018), Stuck Together (2021) and Life for Real (2023).

== Early life ==
Boon was born Daniel Farid Hamidou in a middle-class family in northern France. His father was born in 1930 in Issers, Algeria, and was Muslim and died in Lille, France, in 1992. He was a boxer and a chauffeur. Boon's mother, Danièle Ducatel, is from northern France. A Catholic, she was a stay-at-home mother.

He converted to Judaism (his wife's faith) in 2002.

He studied graphic arts at the Institut Saint-Luc in Belgium.

== Career ==
Boon arrived in Paris in 1989, where he was a mime in the streets for a living while appearing frequently on open mic nights at places such as the Treviso theatre. He borrowed his stage name, Daniel Boone, from a hero in the American television series about an American trapper.

He achieved popularity as a stand-up comedian in several one-man shows.

Boon is also a musician: he has done a version of "Piensa en mí" ("Think of me"). He also writes his songs, for example "Le Blues du 'tiot poulet" ("The Chicken Blues").

After minor roles in movies during the 1990s he landed a role in the 1998 satire Bimboland, directed by Ariel Zeitoun. Boon is deeply attached to his native region, Nord-Pas-de-Calais. In 2003 he made a show in the local dialect of ch'ti, also known as Picard. Despite the use of dialect, 600,000 copies of the DVD (which included French subtitles) were sold. No previous DVD featuring a one-man show had sold in France. In 2004 he was part of the main cast in Pédale Dure, directed by Gabriel Aghion, a critical and commercial flop. He was then offered several roles in movies, notably in the film Joyeux Noël (Merry Christmas), which was released internationally in 2005.

In February 2008 he acted in and directed a movie entitled Welcome to the Sticks (Bienvenue chez les Ch'tis), a success in France and other countries. This comedy broke French box office records based on prejudices about the region. Two weeks after its release, five million people had already seen the film. After its fourth week the figure had risen to 15 million, and by 11 April the film had surpassed the viewing audience of La Grande Vadrouille, having been watched by more than 17.4 million people. He became the highest-paid actor in European film history, netting 26 million euros (c. 33 million dollars). He was the president of the 40th César Awards ceremony in 2015. Boon was on the council of directors of the Pathé production company and has produced several films as actor, co-producer, screenwriter or director. Boon had several production companies, including 26 DB Productions, in Los Angeles, California. They produce and distribute films and TV content.

Boon was also directed by French filmmakers such as Jean-Pierre Jeunet in the 2009 movie Micmacs; Danièle Thompson in 2009 Change of Plans; A Perfect Plan 2012 film directed by Pascal Chaumeil, Julie Delpy's movie Lolo (2015) and Yvan Attal in the 2016 film The Jews.

Raid Dingue was a 2016 comedy that was a big success with the viewers but failed to convince film critics. He was the screenwriter and director of this movie and starred in it. For this film, Boon received the first César du public in the history of French cinema: this new award is given to the French film with the biggest box office of the year. After Raid Dingue, Boon did his sixth movie, (La Ch’tite Famille) Family is Family. It came out in 2018, the 10th anniversary of Bienvenue chez les Ch’tis.

In 2016, Boon starred in a film about anti-semitism in France, The Jews. In 2018, his Netflix show, Des-hauts-de-France, premiered on Netflix. Boon voices the character of Olaf in the French dubbing of the Disney movies Frozen, Frozen 2, Once Upon a Snowman, and Olaf Presents.

== Personal life ==
He has four sons and a daughter from three marriages. With his first wife he had Mehdi, his eldest son, born in 1997. With his second wife, Judith Godrèche, he had Noé, born on 4 September 1999. With his third wife, Yaël Harris, for whom he converted to Judaism in 2002, he had Eytan, born 23 June 2005, Elia, born 20 December 2006, and Sarah, born 1 March 2010.

In July 2022 Boon stated that he had been defrauded of €6 million by Irishman Terry Birles over his boat maintenances and investments in the company in charge of it. When Birles was arrested by InterPol in Panama in 2024, Boon took court action.

== Filmography ==
Year	Title	Role	Director
1996	Oui	Wilfried	Alexandre Jardin
2004	Shark Tale	Frankie (French voice)	Rob Letterman Bibo Bergeron Vicky Jenson
2004	Joyeux Noël	Private Ponchel	Christian Carion
2005	The Valet	Richard	Francis Veber
2005	La Maison du Bonheur	Charles Boulin	Dany Boon
2006	My Best Friend	Bruno Bouley	Patrice Leconte
2008	Bienvenue chez les Ch'tis	Antoine Bailleul	Dany Boon
2008	Horton Hears a Who!	Horton (French voice)	Steve Martino Jimmy Hayward
2008	De l'autre côté du lit	Hugo	Pascale Pouzadoux
2008	Mia et le Migou	le Migou (voice)	Jacques-Rémy Girerd
2009	Micmacs	Bazil	Jean-Pierre Jeunet
2009	Change of Plans	Piotr	Danièle Thompson
2010	Benvenuti al Sud	the French tourist (cameo)	Luca Miniero
2011	Nothing to Declare	Mathias Ducatel	Dany Boon
2011	Zookeeper	Donald the Monkey (French voice)	Frank Coraci
2012	Asterix and Obelix: God Save Britannia	Tetedepiaf	Laurent Tirard
2012	Un plan parfait	Jean-Yves	Pascal Chaumeil
2013	Eyjafjallajökull	Alain	Alexandre Coffre
2013	Frozen	Olaf (French voice)	Chris Buck & Jennifer Lee
2014	Supercondriaque	Romain Faubert	Dany Boon
2015	Lolo	Jean-René	Julie Delpy
2016	The Jews	Pascal	Yvan Attal
2016	The BFG	The BFG (French voice)	Steven Spielberg
2016	Radin!	François Gautier	Fred Cavayé
2017	Raid dingue	Eugène Froissard	Dany Boon
2018	La Ch'tite famille	Valentin	Dany Boon
2019	Murder Mystery	Inspector Laurent Delacroix	Kyle Newacheck
2019	Frozen II	Olaf (French voice)	Chris Buck & Jennifer Lee
2021	Stuck Together	Martin	Dany Boon
2022	Driving Madeleine (Une belle course)	Charles	Christian Carion
2023	The Crime Is Mine	Palmarède	François Ozon
2023	Murder Mystery 2	Inspector Laurent Delacroix	Jeremy Garelick
2023	Life for Real	Tridan Lagache	Dany Boon
2024	This Is the Goat!	Maître Pompignac	Fred Cavayé
TBA	Projet K †	Serge Klarsfeld	Yvan Attal

== One-man shows ==
- Je vais bien, tout va bien (1992)
- Chaud mais pas fatigué (Café de la Gare, 1993)
- Dany Boon Fou ? (Théâtre Tristan-Bernard, Paris, 1994)
- Dany Boon au Théâtre du Rond-Point (1995–96)
- Les Zacros de la télé (1996)
- Tout entier (1997)
- Nouveau spétak (1998).
- Au Bataclan (1998)
- A French Comedian Lost in L.A. (Melrose Theater, Los Angeles) (2000)
- En parfait état (2001)
- A s'baraque et en ch'ti (2003)
- Waïka (novembre 2006)
- Trop stylé (novembre 2009)
- Dany Boon: Des Hauts-De-France (2018)

== Plays ==
- La Vie de chantier (2003)
- Le Dîner de Cons (2007, théâtre de la Porte Saint-Martin)
