= Véronique Silver =

French actress (1931-2010)

Véronique Silver (September 2, 1931 – July 24, 2010) was a French actress.

She was born in Amiens.

== Partial filmography ==
- 1954: Si Versailles m'était conté... (directed by Sacha Guitry) (with Michel Auclair, Jean-Pierre Aumont, Jean-Louis Barrault, Bourvil, Claudette Colbert and Gino Cervi) - Une dame de la cour (uncredited)
- 1957: Méfiez-vous fillettes (directed by Yves Allégret) (with Robert Hossein, Antonella Lualdi and Gérard Oury) - Une fille (uncredited)
- 1958: Les Amants de Montparnasse (directed by Jacques Becker) (with Gérard Philipe, Lilli Palmer, Gérard Séty, Lino Ventura and Anouk Aimée) - (uncredited)
- 1961: Les Moutons de Panurge (directed by Jean Girault, with Darry Cowl and Pascale Roberts) - (uncredited)
- 1962: First Criminal Brigade (directed by Maurice Boutel) (with Dora Doll, Jacques Dumesnil, Jacqueline Joubert and Howard Vernon)
- 1965: Moi et les hommes de 40 ans (directed by Jacques Pinoteau) (with Dany Saval, Paul Meurisse and Michel Serrault) - La secrétaire de Dumourier
- 1971: Mais ne nous délivrez pas du mal (directed by Joël Séria) (with Jeanne Goupil and Michel Robin) - The Countess
- 1977: La Communion solennelle (directed by René Féret) (with Patrick Fierry, Marcel Dalio and Myriam Boyer) - Josette Dauchy à 40 ans / Josette Dauchy at 40
- 1977: Dites-lui que je l'aime (directed by Claude Miller) (with Gérard Depardieu, Miou-Miou, Claude Piéplu, Dominique Laffin and Christian Clavier) - Madame Barbet
- 1978: La Part du feu (directed by Étienne Périer) (with Michel Piccoli, Claudia Cardinale, Jacques Perrin, Rufus and Gabriel Cattand) - Gisèle, la femme du député
- 1978: La Jument vapeur (directed by Joyce Buñuel) (with Carole Laure and Pierre Santini)
- 1978: La Tortue sur le dos (directed by Luc Béraud) (with Jean-François Stévenin and Bernadette Lafont) - Mme Beuve
- 1980: Mon oncle d'Amérique (directed by Alain Resnais) (with Gérard Depardieu, Nicole Garcia, Roger Pierre, Nelly Borgeaud, Henri Laborit and Pierre Arditi) - La mère de Janine
- 1981: Et pourtant elle tourne... (directed by François Raoul-Duval) (with Victor Garrivier) - La mère de Jeanne
- 1981: La Femme d'à côté (directed by François Truffaut) (with Fanny Ardant, Gérard Depardieu, Henri Garcin and Michèle Baumgartner) - Madame Odile Jouve
- 1982: La Passante du Sans-Souci (directed by Jacques Rouffio) (with Romy Schneider and Michel Piccoli) - La présiidente du tribunal
- 1982: Toute une nuit (directed by Chantal Akerman) (with Aurore Clément)
- 1983: L'Archipel des amours (directed by Jean-Claude Biette and Cécile Clairval) - Jeanne (segment "Passage à l'acte")
- 1983: La vie est un roman (directed by Alain Resnais) (with Vittorio Gassman, Ruggero Raimondi and Geraldine Chaplin) - Nathalie Holberg
- 1983: Le Destin de Juliette (directed by Aline Issermann) (with Richard Bohringer and Laure Duthilleul) - Renee
- 1983: Ballade à blanc (directed by Bertrand Gauthier) (with Roland Bertin and Didier Flamand) - Simone
- 1984: Le Chien (directed by Jean-François Gallotte) (with Micheline Presle and Jean-Luc Bideau) - Adèle
- 1984: Stress (directed by Jean-Louis Bertucelli) (with Guy Marchand and André Dussollier) - La patronne du salon de coiffure
- 1984: Blanche et Marie (directed by Jacques Renard) (with Sandrine Bonnaire, Miou-Miou and Gérard Klein) - The physician
- 1985: Le Mystère Alexina (directed by René Féret) (with Philippe Vuillemin, Valérie Stroh and Marianne Basler) - Madame Avril
- 1987 : Killing Time (directed by Édouard Niermans) (with Bernard Giraudeau, Fanny Bastien, Fanny Cottençon, Jean-Pierre Sentier and Michel Aumont) - Madame Bouche
- 1987: Où que tu sois (directed by Alain Bergala) (with Mireille Perrier and Elsa Lunghini) - La mère d'Emmanuel
- 1988: La Maison de jade) (directed by Nadine Trintignant) (with Jacqueline Bisset, Vincent Pérez and Fred Personne) - Germaine
- 1989: Noce blanche (directed by Jean-Claude Brisseau) (with Vanessa Paradis, Bruno Cremer and Ludmila Mikaël) - La conseillère d'éducation
- 1990: Final (Short, directed by Irène Jouannet)
- 1990: Il y a des jours... et des lunes (directed by Claude Lelouch) (with Gérard Lanvin, Patrick Chesnais, Annie Girardot, Francis Huster, Vincent Lindon and Philippe Léotard) - Le femme qui aura toujours 19 ans / Sophie's mother
- 1991: Aujourd'hui peut-être... (directed by Jean-Louis Bertucelli) (with Giulietta Masina, Éva Darlan and Jean Benguigui) - Christiane
- 1992: Les Enfants du naufrageur (directed by Jérôme Foulon) (with Brigitte Fossey, Jacques Dufilho, Michel Robin and Jean Marais)
- 1992: Le Mirage (directed by Jean-Claude Guiguet) (with Fabienne Babe) - Jeanne
- 1993: Attitudes (Short, directed by Éva Darlan) (with Isabelle Renauld and Micky Sébastian)
- 1994: Du fond du cœur (directed by Jacques Doillon) (with Anne Brochet, Benoît Régent and Thibault de Montalembert) - Madame de Nassau
- 1994: Un amour aveugle (directed by Michaëla Watteaux)
- 1996: Le Cœur fantôme (directed by Philippe Garrel) (with Luis Rego, Maurice Garrel, Roschdy Zem and Valeria Bruni Tedeschi) - Philippe's mother
- 1996: Les Frères Gravet (directed by René Féret) (with Jacques Bonnaffé, Jean-François Stévenin, Robin Renucci and Pierre-Loup Rajot) - Médecin-chef
- 1999: Les Passagers (directed by Jean-Claude Guiguet) (with Bruno Putzulu) - La Narratrice
- 2005: Je vous trouve très beau (directed by Isabelle Mergault) (with Michel Blanc, Medeea Marinescu and Wladimir Yordanoff) - Femme "Coeur à Coeur"
- 2007: Faut que ça danse ! (directed by Noémie Lvovsky) (with Jean-Pierre Marielle, Valeria Bruni Tedeschi, Sabine Azéma and Bulle Ogier) - Une dame à l'enterrement (final film role)
