= Jean Benguigui =

French actor

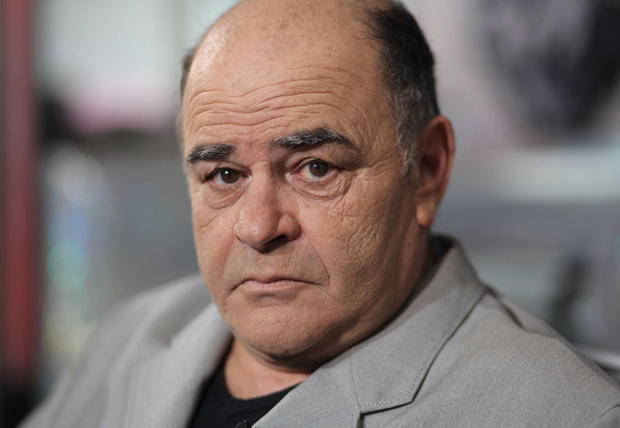
- Jean Benguigui in 2010
- Born: 8 April 1944 (age 82); Oran, French Algeria
- Occupation: Actor
- Years active: 1966 - present
- Relatives: Catherine Benguigui (niece)

Jean Benguigui (born 8 April 1944 in Oran) is a French actor. He is of Jewish-Algerian descent. In 2006 and 2007 he played the role of impresario Cartoni in a new adaptation of the operetta Le Chanteur de Mexico at the Théâtre du Châtelet.

== Filmography ==
Year	Title	Role	Director	Notes
1967	Vampirisme	Taxi driver	Bernard Chaouat & Patrice Duvic	Short
1972	Les camisards	Jean-Baptiste Fort	René Allio	
1973	George Who?	The musical critic	Michèle Rosier	
1973	La ligne de démarcation	The driver	Jacques Ertaud	TV series (1 episode)
1974	La mort d'Ivan Ilitch	Guerassime	Nat Lilienstein	TV movie
1975	The Story of Paul	The Italian	René Féret	
1975	Le pain noir	La Reynie's son	Serge Moati	TV mini-series
1976	Little Marcel		Jacques Fansten	
1976	Don César de Bazan	Gregorio	Jean-Pierre Marchand	TV movie
1977	La question	Claude	Laurent Heynemann	
1977	L'amour en herbe	Langelin	Roger Andrieux	
1977	On ne badine pas avec l'amour	Bridaine	Caroline Huppert	TV movie
1977	Brigade des mineurs	The baker	Claude Loursais	TV series (1 episode)
1978	Stephen		Jean-Jacques Bernard	Short
1978	Une épouse romantique		Robert Réa	Short
1978	Un professeur d'américain	The professor	Patrick Jeudi	TV movie
1978	Commissaire Moulin	Max	François Dupont-Midi	TV series (1 episode)
1979	Buffet froid	The hired killer	Bertrand Blier	
1979	Le pull-over rouge	Charlie	Michel Drach	
1979	Le mors aux dents	René Bosc	Laurent Heynemann	
1979	Memoirs of a French Whore	Jean-Jean	Daniel Duval	
1979	Le journal	Zanucci	Philippe Lefebvre	TV mini-series
1980	Comme le temps passe	Matricante	Alain Levent	TV movie
1980	La traque	Guérin	Philippe Lefebvre	TV mini-series
1980	Cinéma 16	Samuel	Gérard Chouchan	TV series (1 episode)
1980	Julien Fontanes, magistrat	Didier Lamiral	François Dupont-Midi	TV series (1 episode)
1981	Dickie-roi	Alex	Guy Lefranc	TV mini-series
1982	Le Grand Pardon	Albert Bettoun	Alexandre Arcady	
1982	Maman que man		Lionel Soukaz	
1982	La déchirure	Relbach	Franck Apprederis	TV movie
1982	Deuil en vingt-quatre heures	Favart	Frank Cassenti	TV mini-series
1983	L'Africain	Aristote Poulakis	Philippe de Broca	
1983	Le jeune marié	Pierrot	Bernard Stora	
1983	Le grand carnaval	Benjamin Fitoussi	Alexandre Arcady	
1983	La traversée de l'Islande	Olivier	Alain Levent	TV movie
1983	Emmenez-moi au théâtre	Jean	Guy Séligmann	TV series (1 episode)
1984	Le juge	Maître Donati	Philippe Lefebvre	
1984	La Garce	Rony	Christine Pascal	
1984	Le vol du Sphinx	Mendel	Laurent Ferrier	
1984	Souvenirs, Souvenirs	Samuel	Ariel Zeitoun	
1984	L'appartement	Monsieur Da Silva	Dominique Giuliani	TV series (1 episode)
1985	Série noire	Stevio	Jacques Ertaud	TV series (1 episode)
1985	Les Bargeot		Jean-Pierre Barizien	TV series (1 episode)
1986	Les Fugitifs	Labib	Francis Veber	
1987	Control	Max Bloch	Giuliano Montaldo	
1987	Série noire	Massin	Daniel Duval	TV series (1 episode)
1988	Milan noir	De Giorgi	Ronald Chammah	
1988	Une nuit à l'Assemblée Nationale	Marcel	Jean-Pierre Mocky	
1989	Le banquet	Apollodore	Marco Ferreri	TV movie
1990	Dr. M	Rolf	Claude Chabrol	
1990	My New Partner II	Cesarini	Claude Zidi	
1990	Le Gorille	Dom Castro	Roger Hanin	TV series (1 episode)
1990–1996	Imogène	Trouillet	François Leterrier, Paul Vecchiali, ...	TV series (9 episodes)
1991	La Totale!	Sarkis	Claude Zidi	
1991	My Life Is Hell	Mr. Chpil	Josiane Balasko	
1991	Le cri des hommes	Fuentès	Okacha Touita	
1991	A Day to Remember	Marcel	Jean-Louis Bertucelli	
1991	Kaddish		Serge Zeitoun	Short
1992	Loulou Graffiti	Commissaire Bloc	Christian Lejalé	
1992	La Belle Histoire	Doga	Claude Lelouch	
1992	Day of Atonement	Albert Bettoun	Alexandre Arcady	
1992	L'élixir d'amour	M.G.M.	Claude d'Anna	TV movie
1993	Tango	Lefort	Patrice Leconte	
1993	3-5-8		Thierry Aoudja	Short
1993	Anges ou démons ?	Louis Blancard	Pierre Aknine	TV movie
1994	La règle de l'homme	Arthur	Jean-Daniel Verhaeghe	TV movie
1994	Julie Lescaut	Chapuis	Josée Dayan	TV series (1 episode)
1995	Navarro	Negri	Gérard Marx	TV series (1 episode)
1996	Hi Cousin!	Maurice	Merzak Allouache	
1996	Le Fils de Gascogne	Himself	Pascal Aubier	
1996	Méfie-toi de l'eau qui dort	Monsieur Salmain	Jacques Deschamps	
1996	La pitié du diable	Raziel	Ghislain Allon & Michaela Heine	TV movie
1996	Berjac	Guy Jacquet	Jean-Michel Ribes	TV mini-series
1997	The Swindle	Guadeloupe Gangster	Claude Chabrol	
1997	Over the Rainbow	Guardian	Alexandre Aja	Short
1998	Bingo!	Tikossian	Maurice Illouz	
1998	Dossier: disparus	Finidori	Antoine Lorenzi	TV series (1 episode)
1999	Merci mon chien	Raph	Philippe Galland	
1999–2004	Pepe Carvalho	Biscuter	Franco Giraldi, Merzak Allouache, ...	TV series (10 episodes)
2000	En face	Henri	Mathias Ledoux	
2000	Vérité oblige	Morel	Jacques Malaterre	TV series (1 episode)
2000	Les redoutables		Yves Boisset	TV series (1 episode)
2001	Un aller simple	Place Vendôme	Laurent Heynemann	
2001	La juge Beaulieu	Simon Etcheverry	Joyce Buñuel	TV movie
2002	Le Boulet	Saddam	Alain Berbérian & Frédéric Forestier	
2002	Asterix & Obelix: Mission Cleopatra	Malococsis	Alain Chabat	
2002	Il giovane Casanova	Silhouette	Giacomo Battiato	TV movie
2002–2012	Le 17	Roger Carrasco	Éric Lavaine, Bénabar, ...	TV series (7 episodes)
2003	I, Cesar	Papy	Richard Berry	
2003	L'adieu	Lucien	François Luciani	TV movie
2004	Les Dalton	The Village Chief	Philippe Haïm	
2004	Mariage mixte	Maurice Abecassis	Alexandre Arcady	
2004	Turn Left at the End of the World	Isaac Shushan	Avi Nesher	
2004	Qui mange quand?	M. Arnaud	Jean-Paul Lilienfeld	TV movie
2005	La vie de Michel Muller est plus belle que la vôtre	Himself	Michel Muller	
2005	Don Quichotte ou Les mésaventures d'un homme en colère	Sancho Panza	Jacques Deschamps	TV movie
2006	Those Happy Days	Mimoun	Éric Toledano and Olivier Nakache	
2007	Gomez vs Tavarès	Jacques	Gilles Paquet-Brenner & Cyril Sebas	
2007	Ali Baba et les 40 voleurs	Cassim	Pierre Aknine	TV movie
2008	Dinle neyden		Jacques Deschamps	
2008	Hello Goodbye	Simon Gash	Graham Guit	
2008	Les héritières	Ange Caponi	Harry Cleven	TV movie
2009	Coco	Zerbib	Gad Elmaleh	
2009	Tellement proches	Prosper	Éric Toledano and Olivier Nakache	
2009–2011	Aïcha	Doctor Accoca	Yamina Benguigui	TV series (2 episodes)
2010	Fatal	Tony Tarba	Michaël Youn	
2010	A Cat in Paris	Victor Costa	Jean-Loup Felicioli & Alain Gagnol	
2011	La Croisière	The commander	Pascale Pouzadoux	
2011	Le sang de la vigne	Massip	Marc Rivière	TV series (1 episode)
2012	La baie d'Alger	Steiger	Merzak Allouache	TV movie
2012	Yann Piat, chronique d'un assassinat	Joseph Sercia	Antoine de Caunes	TV movie
2014	Un homme d'État	Michel Tourande	Pierre Courrège	
2015	Les gorilles	Vargas	Tristan Aurouet	
2015	Scènes de ménages: Enfin en vacances, à la mer	Norbert	Karim Adda & Francis Duquet	TV movie
2015	Capitaine Marleau	Pierre Lacoudre	Josée Dayan	TV series (1 episode)
2015	Nos chers voisins	Kévin	Elsa Bennett	TV series (1 episode)
2016	Prof T.	Valéry d'Ormont	Nicolas Cuche & Jean-Christophe Delpias	TV series (6 episodes)
2017	Scènes de ménages: Cap sur la Riviera!	Norbert	Karim Adda & Francis Duquet	TV movie
2018	Brillantissime	The butcher	Michèle Laroque	
2018	Une intime conviction	Maître Francis Szpiner	Antoine Raimbault	
2020	Les copains d'abord	Bernard	Denis Imbert	TV series (6 episodes)
2023	Le petit blond de la Casbah	Lisa	Antoine Lisner	

== Theatre ==
Year	Title	Author	Director
1966	L'Affaire de la rue de Lourcine	Eugène Marin Labiche	Patrice Chéreau
1967	The Soldiers	Jakob Michael Reinhold Lenz	Patrice Chéreau
1967	Le Voleur de femmes	Guan Hanqing	Patrice Chéreau
1971	Le Camp du drap d'or	Serge Rezvani	Jean-Pierre Vincent
1971	Capitaine Schelle, Capitaine Eçço	Serge Rezvani	Jean-Pierre Vincent
1972–1973	In the Jungle of Cities	Bertolt Brecht	André Engel
1974	An Optimistic Tragedy	Vsevolod Vishnevsky	Bernard Chartreux & Jean-Pierre Vincent
1976	As You Like It	William Shakespeare	Benno Besson
1977	On ne badine pas avec l'amour	Alfred de Musset	Caroline Huppert
1979	Platonov	Anton Chekhov	Gabriel Garran
1985–1986	The Underpants	Carl Sternheim	Jacques Rosner
1986	The Threepenny Opera	Bertolt Brecht	Giorgio Strehler
1987–1988	L'Éloignement	Loleh Bellon	Bernard Murat
1993	Staline	Gaston Salvatore	Alain Maratrat
1994	Marchands de caoutchouc	Hanoch Levin	Jacques Nichet
1995	Brèves de comptoir	Jean-Marie Gourio	Jean-Michel Ribes
1997	Derrière les collines	Jean-Louis Bourdon	Jean-Louis Bourdon
2004–2006	Grosse chaleur	Laurent Ruquier	Patrice Leconte
2006	The Singer from Mexico	Raymond Vincy & Jesus Maria de Arozamena	Emilio Sagi
2006	La République de Mek-Ouyes	Jacques Jouet	Jean-Louis Martinelli
2009	Chat en poche	Georges Feydeau	Pierre Laville
2010	Miam miam	Édouard Baer	Édouard Baer
2013	Le Plus Heureux des trois	Eugène Marin Labiche & Edmond Gondinet	Didier Long
2013–2015	Address Unknown	Kressmann Taylor	Delphine de Malherbe
2015–2016	The Cat	Georges Simenon	Didier Long
2018	La Moustâche	Sacha Judaszko & Fabrice Donnio	Jean-Luc Moreau
2018	Address Unknown	Kressmann Taylor	Delphine de Malherbe

== Dubbing ==
Year	Title	Role	Actor
1990	Goodfellas	Tommy DeVito	Joe Pesci
1994	Léon: The Professional	Mathilda's father	Michael Badalucco
2004	Shark Tale	Sykes	Martin Scorsese

== Author ==
Year	Book	Publishing
2014	Un parfum d'orange amère	Fayard
