= Éva Darlan =

French actress and film director (born 1948)

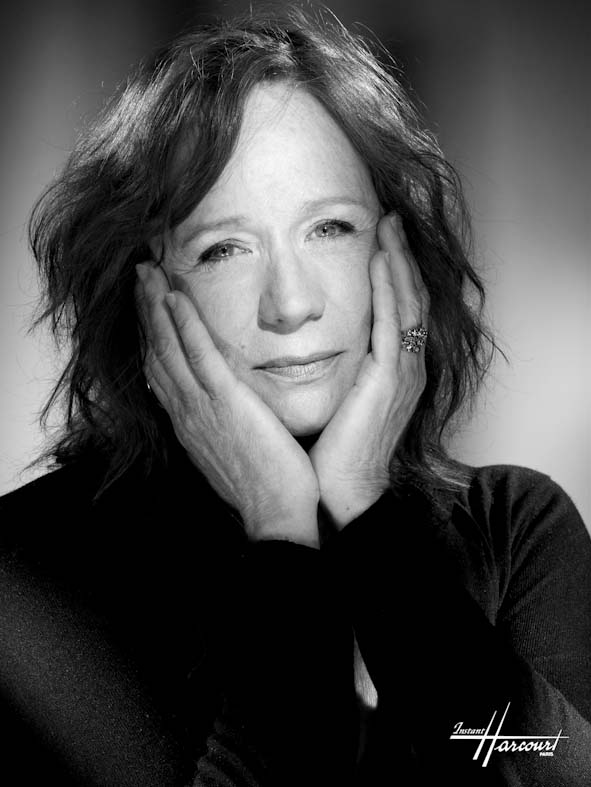
- Éva Darlan photographed by Studio Harcourt in 2008.
- Born: Éva Osty; September 3, 1948 (age 78); Paris, France
- Citizenship: France
- Occupations: Actress; director; producer; writer
- Years active: 1968–2020
- Children: 2

Éva Darlan (née Osty; born 3 September 1948) is a French actress, director, producer and writer.

== Career ==
At the age of 14, she attended acting classes at the Cours Simon and starts at 16 years as an amateur. She took theater studies at the École nationale supérieure des arts et techniques du théâtre, located Rue Blanche and then immediately starts a theatrical career.

In 1978, she had been nominated for the César Award for Best Supporting Actress, for A Simple Story in which she played the role of Anna.

== Writer ==
- Darlan, Eva (1985). Le journal d'une chic fille (French ed.). Albin Michel (1985). ISBN 978-2226024862.
- Darlan, Eva (2013). Crue et nue: Le manifeste de mon corps (French ed.). Jean-Claude Gawsewitch (2013). ISBN 978-2350134062.
- Darlan, Eva (15 January 2015). Je krach ! (French ed.). Du Moment (2015). ISBN 978-2354173418.
- Darlan, Eva (2 June 2016). Grâce ! Mes combats jusqu'à Jacqueline Sauvage (French ed.). Plon (2016). ISBN 978-2259249676.

== Filmography ==
Year	Title	Role	Director	Notes
1976	The Toy	The Press Secretary	Francis Veber	
1977	Pour Clémence	Sarah	Charles Belmont	
1977	Monsieur Papa	Sylviane	Philippe Monnier	
1978	A Simple Story	Anna	Claude Sautet	Nominated - César Award for Best Supporting Actress
1978	Pauline et l'ordinateur	Hostess	Francis Fehr	
1979	Rien ne va plus	Jenny Blanka	Jean-Michel Ribes	
1979	Ils sont grands, ces petits	Nadine	Joël Santoni	
1979	Histoires insolites	Pauline	Yves Boisset	TV series (1 episode)
1980	Caméra une première	Françoise	Patrick Antoine	TV series (1 episode)
1981	The Promising Boy	Klavis, the Swiss girl	Miloš Radivojević	
1981	Une affaire d'hommes	Solange Servolle	Nicolas Ribowski	
1981	Les Uns et les Autres	Eva	Claude Lelouch	
1981	Histoire contemporaine	Madame de Gromance	Michel Boisrond	TV mini-series
1981	Médecins de nuit	Michèle Beaumier	Peter Kassovitz	TV series (1 episode)
1982–1984	Merci Bernard	Various	Jean-Michel Ribes	TV series (11 episodes)
1983	Banzaï	Carole	Claude Zidi	
1983	Traversées	Vera	Mahmoud Ben Mahmoud	
1983	Les uns et les autres	Eva	Claude Lelouch	TV mini-series
1985	Parking	Dominique Daniel	Jacques Demy	
1985	Parole de flic	Dominique Reiner	José Pinheiro	
1985	Le réveillon	Denise Masclaffier	Daniel Losset	TV movie
1985	Un homme comblé	Laura	Paula Delsol	TV movie
1987	Poule et frites	Véra's friend	Luis Rego	
1987	Keep Your Right Up	The passenger	Jean-Luc Godard	
1987	Horoscope favorable	The woman	Christine Ehm	Short
1987	Sentiments	Caroline	Jean-Louis Bertucelli	TV series (1 episode)
1987	Marc et Sophie	Martine Hardy	Christiane Spiero	TV series (1 episode)
1988	Baby Blues	Brigitte Uzes	Daniel Moosmann	
1988	La petite amie	Béatrice	Luc Béraud	
1988	Les saisons du plaisir	Marthe Germain	Jean-Pierre Mocky	
1988	Le bonheur se porte large	Florence	Alex Métayer	
1988	Sueurs froides	The journalist's wife	Bernard Nauer	TV series (1 episode)
1988	M'as-tu-vu ?	Maria	Éric Le Hung	TV series (5 episodes)
1988–1989	Palace	Various	Jean-Michel Ribes	TV series (6 episodes)
1989	Un été d'orages	Hélène	Charlotte Brändström	
1990	Un enfant dans la tourmente	Aunt Cielia	Piero Schivazappa	TV mini-series
1991	Sushi Sushi	Hélène	Laurent Perrin	
1991	A Day to Remember	Marie	Jean-Louis Bertucelli	
1991	Le vent de la Toussaint	Jacqueline Peyrot	Gilles Béhat	
1991	Largo desolato	Zuzana	Agnieszka Holland	TV movie
1991	Screen Two	Francoise Gite	Nicholas Renton	TV series (1 episode)
1992	Rumeurs	Christine	André Flédérick	TV movie
1992	Dis maman, tu m'aimes ?	Hélène	Jean-Louis Bertucelli	TV movie
1993	1, 2, 3, Sun	Jeanine	Bertrand Blier	
1993	Le château des oliviers	Mireille Bouvier	Nicolas Gessner	TV mini-series
1993	Deux justiciers dans la ville	Christine Morel	Franck Apprederis	TV series (1 episode)
1994	The Patriots	Madame Prieur	Éric Rochant	
1995	L'amour en prime	Madame K.	Patrick Volson	TV movie
1996	La dame du cirque	Jeanne	Igaal Niddam	TV movie
1997	Violetta la reine de la moto	Roseline	Guy Jacques	
1997	Parfum de famille	Jacqueline	Serge Moati	TV movie
1998	Le temps d'un éclair	Julie	Marco Pauly	TV movie
1998	Les marmottes	Frédérique	Jean-Denis Robert & Daniel Vigne	TV mini-series
1999	J'ai fait des sandwiches pour la route	The woman	Stéphan Guérin-Tillié	Short
1999	Palazzo	Laetitia Palazzo	Patrick Jamain	TV movie
1999	Les complices	Nicole Lambert	Serge Moati	TV movie
1999	Du jour au lendemain	Marie-Josée Rodrigue	Bruno Herbulot	TV movie
1999–2001	Les Monos	Margot	José Pinheiro, Williams Crépin, ...	TV series (6 episodes)
2000	Crime Scenes	Inspector	Frédéric Schoendoerffer	
2000	Deux frères	Muriel	Philippe Laïk	TV movie
2000	Charmants voisins	Catherine Berger	Claudio Tonetti	TV movie
2000	Les jours heureux	Françoise	Luc Béraud	TV movie
2000	Just a Question of Love	Emma Martin	Christian Faure	TV movie
2000	Drug Scenes	The mother	Isabelle Doval	TV series (1 episode)
2000	Joséphine, ange gardien	Armelle Langlois	Laurence Katrian	TV series (1 episode)
2001	Vices & Services		Olivier Soler	Short
2001	Villa mon rêve	Patricia Latour	Didier Grousset	TV movie
2001	De toute urgence	Davennes	Philippe Triboit	TV movie
2001	Les filles à papa	Carole Daloiseau	Marc Rivière	TV movie
2002	Femme Fatale	Irma	Brian De Palma	
2002	Raisons économiques	The 50 years old woman	Patrice Jourdan & Sören Prévost	Short
2002	La mort est rousse	Patricia	Christian Faure	TV movie
2002	Le secret de la belle de Mai	Nicole	Patrick Volson	TV movie
2002	On n'a plus de sushis à se faire	Micheline	Philippe Venault	TV movie
2002	Tous les chagrins se ressemblent	Béatrice	Luc Béraud	TV movie
2002	Navarro	Solange	Gilles Béhat	TV series (1 episode)
2002	Le boiteux	Madame Gauton	Philippe Venault	TV series (1 episode)
2003	Toutes les filles sont folles	Céleste and Rosalie's Mother	Pascale Pouzadoux	
2003	La crim'	Mireille Maizières	Dominique Guillo	TV series (1 episode)
2004	Grande École	Madame Chouquet	Robert Salis	
2004	Le plus beau jour de ma vie	Sylvaine Després	Julie Lipinski	
2004	Ciao bambino	The Blue Fairy	Pascal Chauveau	Short
2004	Je m'indiffère	The Mother	Alain Rudaz & Sébastien Spitz	Short
2004	L'un contre l'autre	Jeanne	Dominique Baron	TV movie
2004	Trop jeune pour moi ?	Béatrice	Patrick Volson	TV movie
2004–2006	Madame le proviseur	Marie Calvet	Philippe Bérenger	TV series (5 episodes)
2005	Je vous trouve très beau	Madame Marais	Isabelle Mergault	
2006	Inconnue de la départementale	Maryse	Didier Bivel	TV movie
2006	Navarro	Marlène Brunel	Jean Sagols	TV series (1 episode)
2007	The Merry Widow	Catherine	Isabelle Mergault	
2007	Acteur		Jocelyn Quivrin	Short
2007	Valérian and Laureline	Voice	Philippe Vidal	TV series (1 episode)
2008	A Day at the Museum	The guide 'Family Art'	Jean-Michel Ribes	
2008	La dame de chez Maxim	Madame Claux	Jean-Luc Orabona	TV movie
2009	La liste	Martha Lombardi	Christian Faure	TV movie
2010	Un divorce de chien	Louise	Lorraine Lévy	TV movie
2010–2016	Fais pas ci, fais pas ça	Monique	Laurent Dussaux, Jérôme Navarro, ...	TV series (7 episodes)
2011	Beur sur la ville	Madame Gassier	Djamel Bensalah	
2011	Maman !	The pharmacist	Hélène de Fougerolles	Short
2011	Camping paradis	Sister Mathilde	Philippe Proteau	TV series (1 episode)
2012	Foot Lose	Marie Caroline	Charles Meurisse	TV series (1 episode)
2013	Ma vie au grand air	Eve	Nicolas Herdt	TV movie
2013	Scènes de ménage	Jacqueline	Francis Duquet	TV series (1 episode)
2014	Piège blanc	Victoria	Abel Ferry	TV movie
2014	Candice Renoir	Francesca Gherini	Nicolas Picard	TV series (1 episode)
2015	Mes grand-mères et moi	Colette	Thierry Binisti	TV movie
2015	Nos chers voisins	Petula	Emmanuel Rigaut	TV series (1 episode)
2015	Joséphine, ange gardien	Jacqueline Legendre	Jean-Marc Seban	TV series (1 episode)
2016	La promesse du feu	Nancy Le Guen	Christian Faure	TV movie
2018	Scènes de ménages: Aventures sous les Tropiques	Bernadette	Francis Duquet	TV movie
2019	La promesse de l'eau	Nancy Le Guen	Christian Faure	TV movie
2020	Villa Caprice	Isabelle Jacquin	Bernard Stora	

== Theatre ==
Year	Title	Author	Director	Notes
1968	The Star Turns Red	Seán O'Casey	Pierre Valde	
1969	La Celestina	Fernando de Rojas	René Mairal	
1972	The Imaginary Invalid	Molière	Jean-Louis Roux	Théâtre du Nouveau Monde
1976	Les 3 Jeanne	Les 3 Jeanne	Les 3 Jeanne	
1977	A force d'attendre l'autobus	Éva Darlan	Éva Darlan	
1977	Par delà les marronniers	Jean-Michel Ribes	Jean-Michel Ribes	
1978	Les Fraises musclées	Jean-Michel Ribes	Jean-Michel Ribes	
1978	Jacky Paradis	Jean-Michel Ribes	Jean-Michel Ribes	
1985	Tailleur pour dames	Georges Feydeau	Bernard Murat	Théâtre des Bouffes-Parisiens
1991	Le Vieil Hiver	Roger Planchon	Roger Planchon	
1991	Rumors	Neil Simon	Pierre Mondy	Théâtre du Palais-Royal
1992	Fragile Forêt	Roger Planchon	Roger Planchon	Théâtre national de la Colline
1994	À cloche pied	Patricia Levrey	Patricia Levrey	
1995	Par-dessus la jambe	Patricia Levrey	Patricia Levrey	
2001	Tartuffe	Molière	Jean-Claude Brialy	
2002	The Miser	Molière	Daniel Benoin	Monfort-Théâtre
2002	Baron	Jean-Marie Besset	Jean-Marie Besset & Gilbert Désveaux	
2003	The Vagina Monologues	Eve Ensler	Isabelle Rattier	
2004	Faux Départ	Jean-Marie Chevret	Thierry Harcourt	
2005	Celebration	Harold Pinter	Roger Planchon	Théâtre du Rond-Point
2006	Divins Divans	Sophie Daquin & Éva Darlan	Jean-Paul Muel	
2008	The Bald Soprano	Eugène Ionesco	Daniel Benoin	Monfort-Théâtre
2008	Bains de minuit	Jack William Sloane	Daniel Colas	
2009	Chat en poche	Georges Feydeau	Christophe Barratier	
2009	Divins Divans	Sophie Daquin & Éva Darlan	Jean-Paul Muel	
2012	The School for Scandal	Richard Brinsley Sheridan	Stéphane Boutet	
2013	Crue et nue	Éva Darlan	Jean-Paul Muel	
2015	Conseil de famille	Amanda Sthers & Morgan Spillemaecker	Eric Civanyan	Théâtre de la Renaissance
