= The Accuser (film) =

- Theatrical release poster
- Directed by: Jean-Louis Bertucelli
- Written by: Stephen Becker; Jean-Louis Bertucelli; René-Victor Pilhes (novel)
- Produced by: Yves Gasser; Yves Peyrot
- Starring: Jean Yanne; Michel Piccoli; Jean-Pierre Marielle
- Cinematography: Andréas Winding
- Edited by: Catherine Bernard; François Ceppi
- Music by: Richard Rodney Bennett
- Distributed by: Parafrance
- Release date: 7 September 1977
- Running time: 102 minutes
- Country: France
- Language: French

The Accuser (French: L'Imprécateur) is a 1977 French film directed by Jean-Louis Bertucelli. It is based on the eponymous novel L'Imprécateur written by René-Victor Pilhes in 1974.

== Synopsis ==
After an executive is killed in a mysterious car accident, the French offices of his multinational company based in Paris is inundated with mysteriously threatening be-ribboned anti-capitalist tracts, delivered overnight to everyone's desks. When Americans from the head office get wind of these developments, they institute a search for the perpetrator which leads to mysterious subterranean passages under the company's skyscraper.

== Cast ==
- Jean Yanne as Director of Human Resources
- Michel Piccoli as Saint-Ramé
- Jean-Pierre Marielle as Roustev
- Marlène Jobert as Madam Arangrude
- Jean-Claude Brialy as Le Rantec
- Michael Lonsdale as Abéraud
- Robert Webber as The American Executive

== Discography ==
The CD soundtrack composed by Richard Rodney Bennett is available on Music Box Records label (website).
