= The Passengers (1999 film) =

1999 film

- Directed by: Jean-Claude Guiguet
- Written by: Jean-Claude Guiguet; Haydée Caillot; Gwenaëlle Simon
- Produced by: Frédéric Bourboulon; Christian Tison
- Starring: Fabienne Babe
- Cinematography: Philippe Bottiglione
- Edited by: Khadicha Bariha; Marie Tisserand
- Release date: 2 June 1999
- Running time: 93 minutes
- Country: France
- Language: French

The Passengers (French: Les passagers) is a 1999 French drama film directed by Jean-Claude Guiguet. It was screened in the Un Certain Regard section at the 1999 Cannes Film Festival.

== Cast ==
- Fabienne Babe - Anna
- Philippe Garziano - Pierre
- Bruno Putzulu - David
- Stéphane Rideau - Marco
- Gwenaëlle Simon - Isabelle (as Gwénaëlle Simon)
- Véronique Silver - La Narratrice
- Jean-Christophe Bouvet - Le Voyageur
- Marie Rousseau - Christine
- Laurent Aduso - La Malade
- Thomas Badek - Le Golden Boy et le Médecin
- Emmanuel Bolève - Le jeune homme
- Jean-Paul Bordes - Le Prêtre
- Serge Bozon - Un Voyageur
- Sébastien Charles - Raoul
- Marie-Christine Damiens - Marie
