= The Merry Widow (2007 film) =

- Theatrical release poster
- Directed by: Isabelle Mergault
- Written by: Jean-Pierre Hasson; Isabelle Mergault
- Produced by: Jean-Louis Livi
- Starring: Michèle Laroque; Jacques Gamblin
- Cinematography: Philippe Pavans de Ceccatty
- Edited by: Véronique Parnet
- Music by: Laurent Marimbert
- Production company: Gaumont
- Distributed by: Gaumont
- Release dates: November 2007 (Sarlat Film Festival); 16 January 2008 (France)
- Running time: 97 minutes
- Country: France
- Language: French
- Budget: $7.6 million
- Box office: $22.7 million

The Merry Widow (French: Enfin veuve) is a 2007 French comedy film directed by Isabelle Mergault and starring Michèle Laroque and Jacques Gamblin.

== Plot ==
Anne-Marie Gratigny is married to a famous plastic surgeon, Gilbert. She has a good life, with maids, money, and everything ordinary women would dream of. But her marriage is a total failure. Her husband lives for his job and does not pay proper attention to Anne-Marie. As a result of years of neglect, Mrs. Gratigny has a lover named Leo, who works as a ship builder, and is urging Anne-Marie to leave her husband and this unbearable situation, and go with him to China, where he is seeking a big project for his work. However, after spending an entire day out, planning her departure, when Anne-Marie returns home, she is surprised to find the whole family there, with some very shocking news: Gilbert has died in a car accident. Relieved that her failed marriage is at an end, Anne-Marie now sees the chance to meet her lover more often, and is looking forward to being able to go to China with him, but all her hopes are dashed by the continuous presence of her family and in particular her son, who won't give her a break, thinking she's in shock because of losing her husband. She now has to pretend to be in mourning and hide her happiness and relief.

== Cast ==
- Michèle Laroque as Anne-Marie Gratigny
- Jacques Gamblin as Léo Labaume
- Wladimir Yordanoff as Gilbert Gratigny
- Tom Morton as Christophe Gratigny
- Valérie Mairesse as Nicole
- Claire Nadeau as Viviane
- Éva Darlan as Catherine
- Caroline Raynaud as Alexia Gratigny
- Paul Crauchet as Gaby Gratigny
- Michel Lagueyrie as Michel
- Choukri Gabteni as Saadi
- Franck Pitiot as Maurice
- Fabienne Chaudat as The neighbor
