= A Day to Remember (1991 film) =

French film directed by Jean-Louis Bertuccelli

Aujourd'hui peut-être...
- Directed by: Jean-Louis Bertuccelli
- Written by: Isabelle Mergault; Jean-Louis Bertucelli
- Starring: Giulietta Masina
- Cinematography: Bernard Lutic
- Edited by: Nicolas Barachin
- Release date: 20 March 1991 (France)
- Running time: 90 minutes
- Country: France
- Language: French

A Day to Remember (French: Aujourd'hui peut-être...) is a 1991 French film directed by Jean-Louis Bertuccelli starring Giulietta Masina.

== Plot ==
Bertille is an old woman living in the French countryside who is preparing to sell her home and move in with her daughter. Before she sells the property, she invites her children for a last visit at their childhood home. This visit brings about typical family reminiscences and conflicts, including the homecoming of her youngest son who has been in prison.

== Cast ==
- Giulietta Masina as Bertille
- Véronique Silver as Christiane
- Éva Darlan as Marie
- Jean Benguigui as Marcel
- Muni as Thérèse
- Michel Berto as Bruno
- Jacques Toja as Jean-François
- Maxime Leroux as Raphaël
- Georges Staquet as Alain
- Isabelle Mergault as Elisa
- François Dyrek as Jean
- Pierre Gérald as Lucien
