= Wladimir Yordanoff =

French actor (1954–2020)

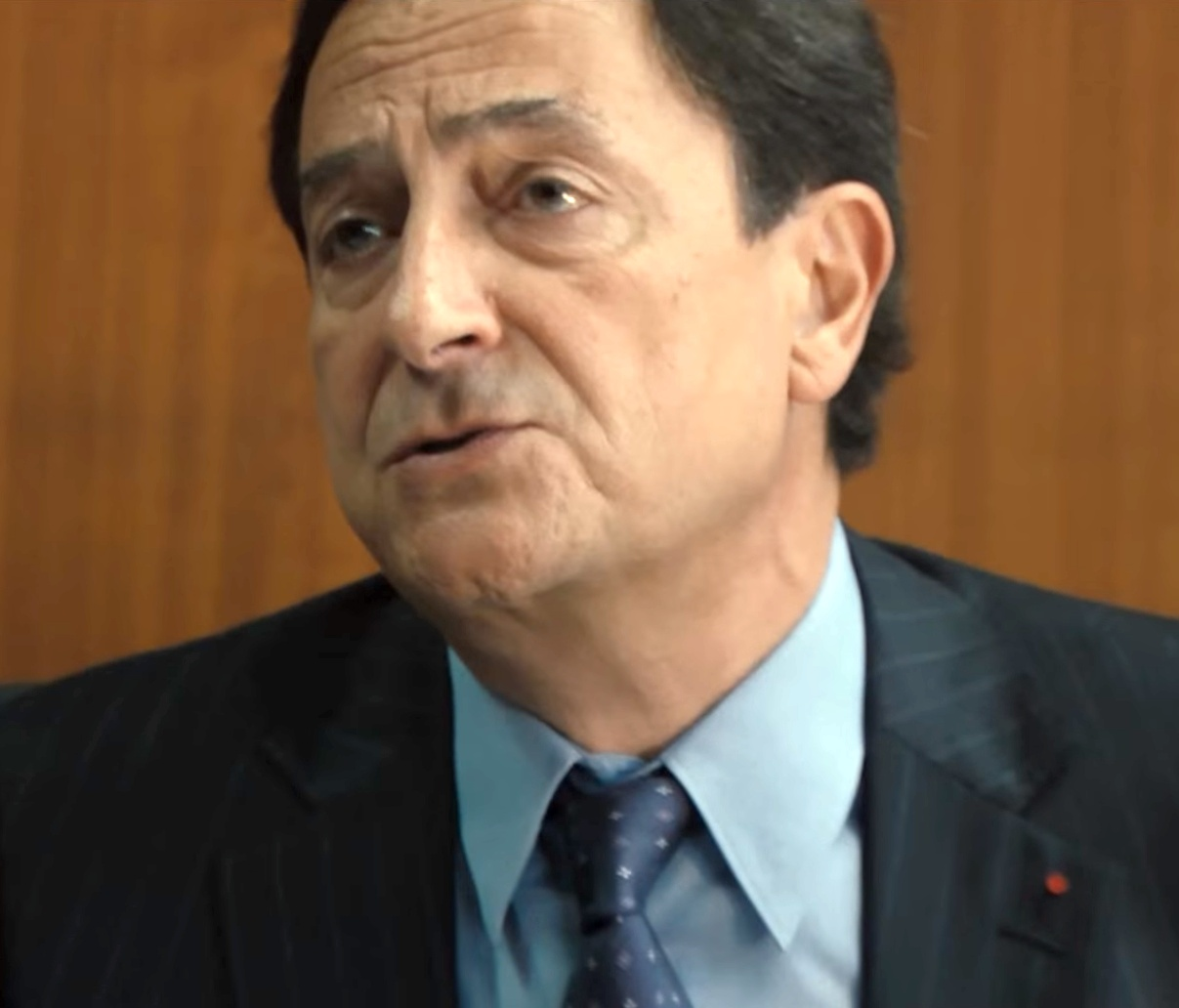
- Yordanoff in November 2015
- Born: 28 March 1954; Chatou, Yvelines, France
- Died: 6 October 2020 (aged 66); Caen, Calvados, France
- Occupation: Actor
- Years active: 1974–2020

Wladimir Yordanoff (Bulgarian: Владимир Йорданов; 28 March 1954 – 6 October 2020) was a French actor of Bulgarian origin. He appeared in more than sixty films since 1979.

Yordanoff died on 6 October 2020 in Normandy, at the age of 66.

== Theater ==
Year	Title	Author	Director	Notes
1974	Troilus and Cressida	William Shakespeare	Stuart Seide	
1975	'Tis Pity She's a Whore	John Ford	Stuart Seide (2)	
1976	Life Is a Dream	Pedro Calderón de la Barca	Stuart Seide (3)	
1976	Measure for Measure	William Shakespeare	Stuart Seide (4)	
1978	Moby-Dick	Herman Melville	Stuart Seide (5)	
1979-80	Un balcon sur les Andes	Eduardo Manet	Jean-Louis Thamin	
1981	La Fausse Suivante	Pierre de Marivaux	Jean-Michel Rabeux	
1981	Andromaque	Jean Racine	Stuart Seide (6)	
1982	A Midsummer Night's Dream	William Shakespeare	Stuart Seide (7)	
1982	Je rêve mais peut-être que non	Luigi Pirandello	Laurence Février	
1983	A Moon for the Misbegotten	Eugene O'Neill	Laurence Février (2)	
1984	The Future Eve	Auguste Villiers de l'Isle-Adam	Jean-Louis Jacopin	
1984	Le Mal du pays	Jacques-Pierre Amette	Stuart Seide (8)	
1985	The Misanthrope	Molière	André Engel	
1986	The Miser	Molière	Roger Planchon	
1986	Venise sauvée	Hugo von Hofmannsthal	André Engel (2)	
1987	A Doll's House	Henrik Ibsen	Claude Santelli	
1988	Hecuba	Euripides	Bernard Sobel	
1988-89	Hamlet	William Shakespeare	Patrice Chéreau	
1991	Britannicus	Jean Racine	Alain Françon	
1992	In the Company of Men	Edward Bond	Alain Françon (2)	
1994	Family Resemblances	Jean-Pierre Bacri & Agnès Jaoui	Stephan Meldegg	
1997	Lips Together, Teeth Apart	Terrence McNally	Bernard Murat	
1999	Les Huissiers	Michel Vinaver	Alain Françon (3)	
2002	Mother Courage and Her Children	Bertolt Brecht	Christian Schiaretti	
2002	Les Voisins	Michel Vinaver	Alain Françon (4)	
2003-04	The Threepenny Opera	Bertolt Brecht & Kurt Weill	Christian Schiaretti (2)	
2006-09	Coriolanus	William Shakespeare	Christian Schiaretti (3)	Nominated - Molière Award for Best Actor
2009	Une nuit de Grenade	François-Henri Soulié	Jacques Lassalle	
2011-12	Miss Julie	August Strindberg	Christian Schiaretti (4)	
2011-12	Creditors	August Strindberg	Christian Schiaretti (5)	
2013	The Master Builder	Henrik Ibsen	Alain Françon (5)	
2015	Still Storm	Peter Handke	Alain Françon (6)	
2016	Who's Afraid of Virginia Woolf?	Edward Albee	Alain Françon (7)	Molière Award for Best Actor

== Filmography ==
Year	Title	Role	Director	Notes
1979	Les dames de la côte		Nina Companeez	TV mini-series
1980	Les dames de coeur	Adam	Paul Siegrist	TV series (1 episode)
1981	Lapo erzählt...	Tebaldo	Grytzko Mascioni	TV series (1 episode)
1982	Un balcon sur les Andes	Tarassin	Jacques Audoir	TV movie
1983	Sheer Madness	Alexaj	Margarethe von Trotta	
1983	Danton	Head guards	Andrzej Wajda	
1983	Un dimanche de flic	Sylvio	Michel Vianey	
1983	Deux amies d'enfance		Nina Companeez (2)	TV mini-series
1984	La bavure	Livier Fallière	Nicolas Ribowski	TV mini-series
1985	L'Amour braque	Matalon	Andrzej Żuławski	
1985	Contes clandestins	Degand	Dominique Crèvecoeur	
1985	Ett liv		Johan Bergenstråhle & Kjell Grede	TV mini-series
1986	La femme secrète	Marc Allighieri	Sébastien Grall	
1988	Natalia	Verdier	Bernard Cohn	
1988	The Possessed	Lebjadkin	Andrzej Wajda (2)	
1988	Sueurs froides	Philippe's Boss	Patrice Leconte	TV series (1 episode)
1989	Hiver 54, l'abbé Pierre	Senator Charmat	Denis Amar	
1989	Les jupons de la révolution	Nizam	Maroun Bagdadi	TV series (1 episode)
1990	Vincent & Theo	Paul Gauguin	Robert Altman	
1990	Chillers	Fuller	Maroun Bagdadi (2)	TV series (1 episode)
1991	Blanval	Justin	Michel Mees	
1991	Ils n'avaient pas rendez-vous	Manon's father	Maurice Dugowson	TV movie
1993	Cible émouvante	Casa Bianca	Pierre Salvadori	
1993	Les maîtres du pain	Jérôme	Hervé Baslé	TV mini-series
1996	Family Resemblances	Philippe Ménard	Cédric Klapisch	
1997	Mars ou la terre	Roland Briegel	Bertrand Arthuys	TV movie
1998	La clef des champs	Antoine Pujol	Charles Nemes	TV mini-series
2000	The Taste of Others	Antoine	Agnès Jaoui	
2002	L'Auberge Espagnole	Jean-Charles Perrin	Cédric Klapisch (2)	
2002	3 zéros	President Spizner	Fabien Onteniente	
2002	Mille millièmes	Jean-Louis Lacroix	Rémi Waterhouse	
2003	Playing 'In the Company of Men'	Hammer	Arnaud Desplechin	
2003	Nathalie...	François	Anne Fontaine	
2004	La fonte des neiges	Félix	Laurent Jaoui	TV movie
2004	Colette, une femme libre	Henry Gauthier-Villars	Nadine Trintignant	TV mini-series
2005	Je vous trouve très beau	Roland Blanchot	Isabelle Mergault	
2005	Tu vas rire, mais je te quitte	Alain Varenne	Philippe Harel	
2005	Une vie	Jeanne's father	Élisabeth Rappeneau	TV movie
2005	Femmes de loi	François D'Islert / Derrac	Denis Amar (2)	TV series (1 episode)
2006	I Do	Francis Bertoff	Éric Lartigau	
2006	The Colonel	The Chief of Staff	Laurent Herbiet	
2006	Essaye-moi	Jacqueline's father	Pierre-François Martin-Laval	
2007	The Merry Widow	Gilbert Gratigny	Isabelle Mergault (2)	
2007	Sempre vivu !	Sauveur Michelangeli	Robin Renucci	
2007	Les zygs, le secret des disparus	Corbin	Jacques Fansten	TV movie
2007	En marge des jours	Claude	Emmanuel Finkiel	TV movie
2007	Les prédateurs	Maurice Bidermann	Lucas Belvaux	TV series (2 episodes)
2008	Mark of an Angel	Bernard Vigneaux	Safy Nebbou	
2008	Sauvons les apparences !	François	Nicole Borgeat	TV movie
2008	Le malade imaginaire	Béralde	Christian de Chalonge	TV movie
2009	The Hedgehog	Paul Josse	Mona Achache	
2009	Une petite zone de turbulences	David	Alfred Lot	
2009	Ticket gagnant	André Laliche	Julien Weill	TV movie
2010	Les frileux	Hervé	Jacques Fansten (2)	TV movie
2010	Paul et ses femmes	Paul Girard	Élisabeth Rappeneau (2)	TV movie
2011	Polisse	Beauchard	Maïwenn	
2011	Guilty	Lawyer Hubert Delarue	Vincent Garenq	
2011	À dix minutes de nulle part	Monsieur Roger-Maillon	Arnauld Mercadier	TV movie
2011	Empreintes criminelles	François Lefranc	Christian Bonnet	TV series (1 episode)
2011	Les Edelweiss	Charles	Philippe Proteau & Stéphane Kappes	TV series (3 episodes)
2012	Pauline détective	Monsieur Dominique	Marc Fitoussi	
2012	Amitiés sincères	Jacques	François Prévôt-Leygonie & Stéphan Archinard	
2012	Un petit bout de France	Fauquier	Bruno Le Jean	TV movie
2012	Merlin	King Pendragon	Stéphane Kappes (2)	TV mini-series
2015	Boomerang	Charles Rey	François Favrat	
2019	An Officer and a Spy	Auguste Mercier	Roman Polanski	
2021	OSS 117: Alerte Rouge en Afrique Noire		Nicolas Bedos	
