= Pierre Laroque =

French senior civil servant

Pierre Laroque (2 November 1907 in Paris – 21 January 1997 in Paris) was a French senior civil servant known as the "father of social security".

== Biography ==
Admitted to the Conseil d'État in 1929, Pierre Laroque (1907–1997), in 1931, he entered the Cabinet of Adolphe Landry, Minister of Work and Social Care, to become a specialist in social insurance.

In March 1938, he published a report entitled "the North Africans in France", which criticised the Service de surveillance et de protection des Nord-Africains, organised by the Prefecture of Police. In his report, he predicted the dissociation of social protection activities and repressive activities concerning the immigrants of North African origin, but these reforms were not carried out by the Front populaire, the party of the time.

Sacked in October 1940 due to his Jewish roots, he joined the private sector, in Lyon joining the résistance organisation "Combat" and moved to London in April 1943.

Returning to France in June 1944 with General de Gaulle, he was named Director General of social security on 5 October 1944. He then played a considerable part in the setting up of ordinances founding and organising social security.

Replaced by Jacques Doublet, he returned to the Conseil d'État in October 1951. In 1953, he was named President of the Sous-Section du Contentieux, then vice President in 1959, for which he was decorated by 1962 for aiding General de Gaulle with an exercise on special powers named in article 16 of the Constitution. President of the national social security budged, he was a member of and presided over the "Commission d'Étude des problèmes de la Vieillesse", which in January 1962 published the celebrated "Rapport Laroque". In August 1964, he was finally named President of the Social Section of the Conseil d'État, which he exercised until his retirement in 1980.

A long-time holder of the chair in social law at the Institut d'Études Politiques de Paris, he taught generations of civil servants and unionists and published his memoirs: Au service de l'Homme et du Droit. Souvenirs et réflexions. Association pour l'Étude de l'Histoire de la Sécurité sociale, 1, place Fontenoy, Paris.

He is related to the actor and comedian Michèle Laroque.

== Thoughts ==
For Pierre Laroque, "each class forms a relatively closed group: The passage of one to another, while not impossible, is difficult". The distinction between classes is "very largely economic" based on work differences. The social structure tends to be dominated by a differentiation between "a capitalist class, the owners of the means of production" and "a salaried class or proletariat". "Class conflicts" take place in the sphere of the "existing social structure", due to "the social organisation". However, "the difficulty a class faces is knowing the sphere of the existing structure and driving progressively against this structure."
