= Michèle Laroque =

French actress, comedian and producer (born 1960)

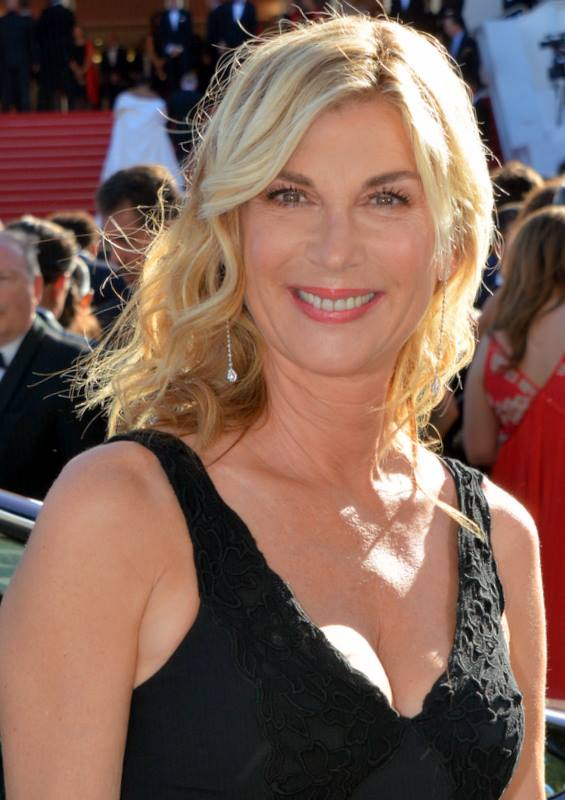
- Laroque at the 2017 Cannes Film Festival
- Born: 15 June 1960 (age 66); Nice, Alpes-Maritimes, France
- Occupations: Actress, comedian, producer, screenwriter
- Height: 5 ft 7.5 in (1.71 m)

Michèle Laroque (French pronunciation: [miʃɛl laʁɔk]; born 15 June 1960) is a French actress, comedienne, producer and screenwriter.

== Early life ==
Michèle Laroque was born in Nice in the department of Alpes-Maritimes. She is the daughter of Romanian dancer and violinist Doina Trandabur, who fled to France to escape Gheorghe Gheorghiu-Dej's regime in Communist Romania. Her father is French doctor Claude Laroque, who met Doina a year earlier during a tour. Michèle is also the niece of Pierre Laroque, the creator of Social Security in France. She studied economics and English, taking comedy classes at the same time in Antibes and then moving to America on a campus in Austin, Texas. In 1979, along with her best friend, she was victim of a car accident that resulted in two years of hospitalisation, a long convalescence and several months of reeducation. Following an extended coma and associated psychological trauma, she made the decision to become a comedian.

== Career ==
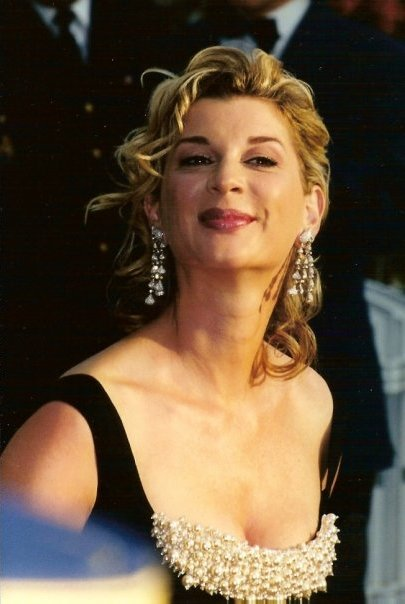
Laroque at the 2001 Cannes Film Festival

She made her television début in 1988 in the humorous programme La Classe hosted by Fabrice every evening on FR3, where she met Pierre Palmade, Muriel Robin and Jean-Marie Bigard.

In 1989, she had her first role in the film Suivez cet avion and later had small roles in Le Mari de la coiffeuse (1990) by Patrice Leconte and Une époque formidable... (1991) by Gérard Jugnot and also starring him in the main role. She was nominated for the César Awards for Best Supporting Actress in La Crise (1992) and Pédale douce (1996).

She joined Les Enfoirés and is a member for the special tours and spectacles for Les Restos du Cœur. She is also the spokesperson for the association Enfance et Partage.

In 2002, she was the voice of Captain Amelia in the French version of the animated film Treasure Planet. In 2007, she appeared in an advertisement for the game Brain Age 2: More Training in Minutes a Day! on Nintendo DS.

In 2025, she joined the cast of Emily in Paris.

== Personal life ==
Michèle Laroque was married to theatre director Dominique Deschamps and they divorced after a brief period. She has a daughter named Oriane (born 12 July 1995), who acted alongside her mother in the film Hey Good Looking !.

Since 2008 she has been in a relationship with politician François Baroin. Her tax exile in the USA ended in 2010, her partner becoming at that time the Budget Minister of France.

In 2010, just as her partner became François Fillon's Budget Minister and Le Canard enchaîné was about to reveal his tax situation, she put an end to her tax expatriation to Las Vegas (a city where residents pay neither local income tax nor local taxes; however, federal income tax remains due). The couple separated at the beginning of 2023.

Michèle Laroque is 5 ft 7.5 in (1.715 m) tall.

== Theatre ==
| Year | Title | Author | Director | Notes |
|---|---|---|---|---|
| 1987 | La Drague | Alain Krief | | |
| 1987–1988 | C'est encore mieux l'après-midi | Ray Cooney | Pierre Mondy | |
| 1988–1989 | La face cachée d'Orion | Lanford Wilson | Blandine Harmelin | |
| 1990 | Coiffure pour dames | Robert Harling | Stéphane Hillel | |
| 1991 | Ornifle ou le Courant d'air | Jean Anouilh | Patrice Leconte | Nominated - Molière Award for Best Supporting Actress |
| 1992 | Je veux faire du cinéma | Neil Simon | Michel Blanc | |
| 1993 | Une folie | Sacha Guitry | Jacques Échantillon | |
| 1993 | Silence en coulisses ! | Michael Frayn | Jean-Luc Moreau | |
| 1994 | Cirque à deux | Barry Creyton | Jean-Michel Ribes | |
| 1996–1999 | Ils s'aiment | Pierre Palmade & Muriel Robin | Muriel Robin | |
| 2001–2004 | Ils se sont aimés | Pierre Palmade & Muriel Robin | Muriel Robin | |
| 2007 | Faisons un rêve | Sacha Guitry | Bernard Murat | |
| 2009 | My Brilliant Divorce | Geraldine Aron | Michèle Laroque | |
| 2012–2013 | Ils se re-aiment | Pierre Palmade & Michèle Laroque | Alex Lutz | |
| 2017–2018 | Ils/Elles s'aiment depuis 20 ans | Pierre Palmade, Muriel Robin & Michèle Laroque | Muriel Robin | |
| 2019 | Encore un instant | Fabrice Roger-Lacan | Bernard Murat | |

== Filmography ==
| Year | Title | Role | Director | Notes |
|---|---|---|---|---|
| 1988 | Vivement lundi | | Didier Albert | TV series (1 episode) |
| 1989 | Suivez cet avion | The stewardess | Patrice Ambard | |
| 1989 | The Hitchhiker | Florence | John Laing | TV series (1 episode) |
| 1989–1990 | Tribunal | Me Adler | Dominique Masson, Claire Blangille, ... | TV series (12 episodes) |
| 1990 | The Hairdresser's Husband | Adopted Child's Mother | Patrice Leconte | |
| 1990 | Imogène | | François Leterrier | TV series (1 episode) |
| 1990 | La télé des inconnus | The host | Gérard Pullicino | TV series (1 episode) |
| 1991 | Une époque formidable... | The headhunter | Gérard Jugnot | |
| 1991 | Bébé express | Agathe | François Dupont-Midi | TV movie |
| 1991 | C'est quoi ce petit boulot? | Madame Robine | Gian Luigi Polidoro & Michel Berny | TV mini-series |
| 1992 | La Crise | Martine | Coline Serreau | Nominated - César Award for Best Supporting Actress |
| 1992 | Max et Jérémie | Suzanne | Claire Devers | |
| 1992 | Coiffure pour dames | Isabelle | Michel Treguer | TV movie |
| 1992 | Les cravates léopards | Madame Bergaux Latour | Jean-Luc Trotignon | TV movie |
| 1993 | Tango | Hélène Baraduc | Patrice Leconte | |
| 1993 | Chacun pour toi | Fernande | Jean-Michel Ribes | |
| 1993 | Louis, the Child King | Duchesse de Longueville | Roger Planchon | |
| 1993 | Paranoïa | | Frédéric Forestier & Stéphane Gateau | Short |
| 1993 | Navarro | Catherine Vallet | Nicolas Ribowski | TV series (1 episode) |
| 1994 | Personne ne m'aime | Marie-Christine | Marion Vernoux | |
| 1994 | Aux petits bonheurs | Sabine | Michel Deville | |
| 1994 | B comme Bolo | Doctor Salomé | Jean-Michel Ribes | TV movie |
| 1995 | Nelly and Mr. Arnaud | Isabelle | Claude Sautet | |
| 1995 | Le fabuleux destin de Madame Petlet | Marcie | Camille de Casabianca | |
| 1995 | Oui | The judge | Pascal Perennes | Short |
| 1995 | Le mouton noir | Cécile | Francis De Gueltz | TV movie |
| 1995 | Le nid tombé de l'oiseau | Eva Prudhomme | Alain Schwartzstein | TV movie |
| 1995 | Une femme dans mon cœur | Alice Bataille | Gérard Marx | TV movie |
| 1995 | Quatre pour un loyer | | Georges Barrier | TV series (1 episode) |
| 1995 | Le retour d'Arsène Lupin | Adrienne | Nicolas Ribowski | TV series (1 episode) |
| 1996 | Fallait pas ! ... | Constance | Gérard Jugnot | |
| 1996 | Pédale douce | Marie Hagutte | Gabriel Aghion | Nominated - César Award for Best Supporting Actress |
| 1996 | Passage à l'acte | Florence | Francis Girod | |
| 1996 | Du cul, du cul, du cul ! | Voice | Patrick Menais | |
| 1996 | Les aveux de l'innocent | The judge | Jean-Pierre Améris | |
| 1996 | The Best Job in the World | Hélène Monier | Gérard Lauzier | |
| 1996 | Elvis Aziz | Hélène Rivard | Frédéric Compain | TV movie |
| 1997 | Ma vie en rose | Hanna Fabre | Alain Berliner | |
| 1998 | The Wall | The TV announcer | Alain Berliner | |
| 1998 | Serial Lover | Claire Doste | James Huth | |
| 1998 | Week-end ! | Hélène | Arnaud Sélignac | TV movie |
| 1998 | Maternité | | Arnaud Sélignac | TV series (1 episode) |
| 1999 | Doggy Bag | Jeanne | Frédéric Comtet | |
| 2000 | Épouse-moi | Oriane Roche | Harriet Marin | |
| 2000 | Une femme neuve | Marie | Didier Albert | TV movie |
| 2001 | The Closet | Mademoiselle Bertrand | Francis Veber | |
| 2001 | J'ai faim !!! | Arlette | Florence Quentin | |
| 2001 | L'oiseau rare | Alexandra | Didier Albert | TV movie |
| 2003 | La chose publique | Michèle | Mathieu Amalric | TV movie |
| 2003 | Mon voisin du dessus | Claire Letellier | Laurence Katrian | TV movie |
| 2004 | Pédale dure | Marie Hagutte | Gabriel Aghion | |
| 2004 | Malabar Princess | Valentine | Gilles Legrand | |
| 2005 | L'anniversaire | Élisabeth | Diane Kurys | |
| 2006 | L'entente cordiale | The bank manager | Vincent De Brus | |
| 2006 | Hey Good Looking! | Isa | Lisa Azuelos | |
| 2006 | La Maison du Bonheur | Anne Boulin | Dany Boon | |
| 2006 | Petits Secrets et gros mensonges | Isabelle Delambre | Laurence Katrian | TV movie |
| 2007 | The Neighbor | Christine | Eddie O'Flaherty | |
| 2007 | The Merry Widow | Anne-Marie Gratigny | Isabelle Mergault | |
| 2007 | En marge des jours | Julie | Emmanuel Finkiel | TV movie |
| 2009 | Dans tes bras | Solange | Hubert Gillet | |
| 2009 | Oscar and the Lady in Pink | Rose | Éric-Emmanuel Schmitt | |
| 2010 | Le grand restaurant | A client | Gérard Pullicino | TV movie |
| 2011 | Monsieur Papa | Marie Vallois | Kad Merad | |
| 2012 | Moi à ton âge ! | Caroline Gardel | Bruno Garcia | TV movie |
| 2012 | La méthode Claire | Claire Robin | Vincent Monnet | TV movie |
| 2014 | Un fils | Mathilde | Alain Berliner | TV movie Festival de La Rochelle - Best Actress |
| 2014 | En pères et contre tout | Claire Robin | Vincent Monnet | TV movie |
| 2015 | Hard | Madeleine Fournier | Laurent Dussaux & Mélissa Drigeard | TV series (7 episodes) |
| 2015–2019 | Peplum | Arria | Philippe Lefebvre & Maurice Barthélemy | TV series (6 episodes) |
| 2016 | Camping 3 | Anne So | Fabien Onteniente | |
| 2016 | The Canterville Ghost | Élisabeth Otis | Yann Samuell | |
| 2016 | Diabolique | Hélène de Lassay | Gabriel Aghion | TV movie |
| 2017 | Alibi.com | Françoise | Philippe Lacheau | |
| 2017 | Chouquette | Diane | Patrick Godeau | |
| 2017 | Embrasse-moi! | Babouchka | Océan & Cyprien Vial | |
| 2018 | Brillantissime | Angela | Michèle Laroque | |
| 2019 | Premier de la classe | Madame Martin | Stéphane Ben Lahcene | |
| 2019 | Joyeuse retraite! | | Fabrice Bracq | |
| 2020 | Chacun chez soi | Catherine | Michèle Laroque | ' |
| 2022 | Ténor | Madame Loyseau | Claude Zidi Jr. | |
| 2025 | Emily in Paris (season 5) | Yvette | Andrew Fleming | |

=== Box-office ===
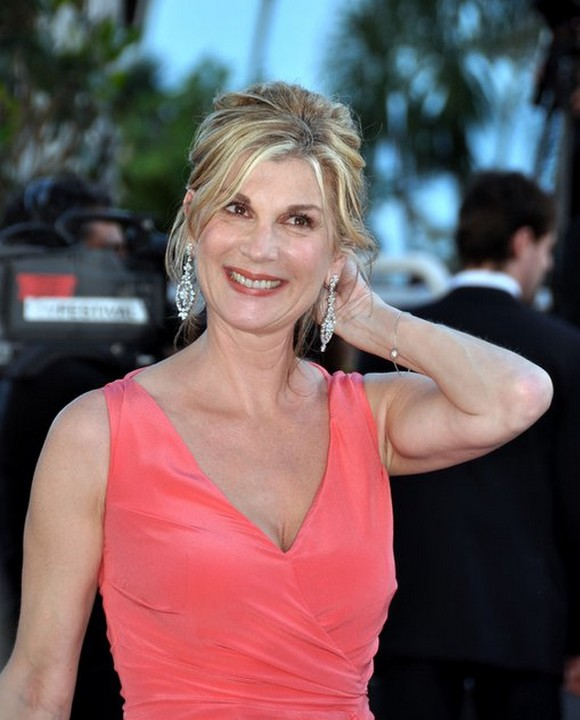
Michèle Laroque at the 2011 Cannes Film Festival

Movies starring Michèle Laroque with more than a million of entries in France.

| | Films | Director | Year | France (entries) |
|---|---|---|---|---|
| 1 | The Closet | Francis Veber | 2001 | 5,317,858 |
| 2 | Pédale douce | Gabriel Aghion | 1996 | 4,162,380 |
| 3 | La Crise | Coline Serreau | 1992 | 2,354,309 |
| 4 | The Best Job in the World | Gérard Lauzier | 1996 | 2,269,925 |
| 5 | The Merry Widow | Isabelle Mergault | 2007 | 2,210,676 |
| 6 | Une époque formidable... | Gérard Jugnot | 1991 | 1,672,754 |
| 7 | Nelly and Mr. Arnaud | Claude Sautet | 1995 | 1,521,041 |
| 8 | Malabar Princess | Gilles Legrand | 2004 | 1,470,701 |
| 9 | La Maison du Bonheur | Dany Boon | 2006 | 1,146,962 |
| 10 | Hey Good Looking ! | Lisa Azuelos | 2006 | 1,066,999 |
