= Hey Good Looking! =

Hey Good Looking !
- Film poster
- Directed by: Lisa Azuelos
- Written by: Lisa Azuelos; Michael Lellouche; Hervé Mimran
- Produced by: Jani Thiltges; Albert Martinez Martin; Juliette Renaud; Claude Waringo; Carola Ash; Benoit Hemard; Alessandra Moresco; Serge Zeitoun
- Starring: Michèle Laroque; Aure Atika; Valérie Benguigui; Géraldine Nakache
- Cinematography: Nigel Willoughby
- Edited by: Philippe Grellat; Nathalie Hubert
- Music by: Alexandre Lier; Sylvain Ohrel; Nicolas Weil
- Production companies: Liaison Cinématographique; Wild Bunch
- Distributed by: Pan Européenne Distribution
- Release date: 10 May 2006
- Running time: 85 minutes
- Country: France
- Language: French
- Budget: $7.3 million
- Box office: $7.1 million

Hey Good Looking! (original title: Comme t'y es belle !) is a 2006 French comedy film directed by Lisa Azuelos.

== Plot ==
Isa, Alice, Léa and Nina are friends and share their disappointments in love, work and family issues. United by the Sephardic Jewish religion and their families, they must deal with traditions and needs of modern life. Marrying an employee to arrange for French nationality, manage tax audits, raise children, participate in family gatherings and follow her diet ... Small hassle and big problems mingle with the story.

== Cast ==
- Michèle Laroque as Isa
- Aure Atika as Léa
- Valérie Benguigui as Alice
- Géraldine Nakache as Nina
- Marthe Villalonga as Liliane
- Francis Huster as David
- Alexandre Astier as Gilles
- Thierry Neuvic as Michel
- Andrew Lincoln as Paul
- Dora Doll as Mémé
- Frédéric Beigbeder as Ivan
- Aurore Auteuil as Carole
- David Kammenos as Simon
- Amel Djemel as Latifa
- Macha Béranger as Aunt Régine
- Farida Ouchani as Fatima
- Idit Cebula as Maggie
- Simone Lankar as Tata Fréha
- David Elmaleh as Serge
- Nikita Lespinasse as Suzie
- Judith Aknine as Madame Benaroche
- Stéphane Foenkinos as Samy
- Hubert Benhamdine as Pierre
- Xavier Briere as Inspector Belvaux
- Yassine Baataoui as Hamadi
- Zara Guebli as Latifa's mother
- Richard Medkour as Gérard
- Stéfano Boullet as Samuel
- Gabrielle Lopes Benites as Emilie
- Marlon Chappat as Ilan
- Oriane Deschamps as Laura
- Frankie Wallach as Kim
- Camille Neyens as Joséphine
- Lola Martiniv as Lou
- Hervé Louis as Chamallow
- Manu Payet as The Man at the synagogue
- Nelson Monfort as The commentator
