= Navarro (TV series) =

French television series

- Genre: Crime drama, mystery fiction
- Created by: Tito Topin, Pierre Grimblat
- Starring: Roger Hanin
- Composers: Serge Perathoner, Yannick Top
- Country of origin: France
- Original language: French
- No. of series: 16
- No. of episodes: 108

Production
- Running time: 90 minutes
- Production company: Hamster Production

Original release
- Network: TF1
- Release: 26 October 1989 – 19 April 2007

Navarro is a crime drama series about a French police commissioner that aired on TF1. It was on the air for 18 years.

== Plot ==
Antoine Navarro solves cases as a French police officer in Paris.

== Cast ==
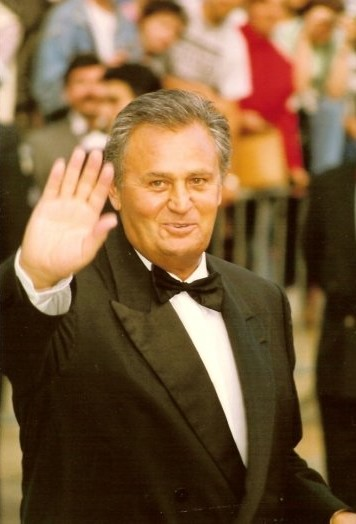
Lead actor Roger Hanin.

- Roger Hanin as Commissioner Antoine Navarro (1989–2005)
- Emmanuelle Boidron as Yolande Navarro, Navarro's Daughter (1989–2005)
- Catherine Allégret as Ginette "Ginou" Bouloche (1989–1995 / 1999–2005)
- Françoise Armelle as Gabrielle "Gaby" Laisi (1997–1998)
- Jacques Martial as Inspector Bain-Marie (later lieutenant) (1989–2004)
- Christian Rauth as Inspector René Auquelin (later Lieutenant) (1989–2004)
- Daniel Rialet as Inspector Joseph Blomet (later Lieutenant) (1989–2004)
- Jean-Claude Caron as Inspector Guisseppe Borelli (later Lieutenant) (1994–2005)
- Grace de Capitani as Inspector Laura Marcos (1993)
- Viktor Lazlo as Captain Roussel (2005)
- Jean-Marie Mistral as Officer Christian Martin (1989–2005)
- Marie Fugain as Lieutenant Carole Maudiard (2000–2005)
- Filip Nikolic as Lieutenant Yann Boldec (2001–2005)
- Anthony Dupray as Lieutenant Lucas Paoli (2003–2006)
- Maurice Vaudaux as Superintendent Maurice Waltz (1989–2006)
- Bernard Larmande as Dr. Salvo Carlo (1989–2005)
- Michel Pilorgé as Professor Bloch, CSU (1991–2005)
- Sam Karmann as Detective Chief Inspector François Barrada (later Commissioner) (1989–1993)
- Isabelle Mergault as Miss Lulu (1989–1991)

=== Guest ===
- Anne Marivin
- Antoine Duléry
- Babsie Steger
- Béatrice Agenin
- Carole Franck
- Corinne Touzet
- Didier Flamand
- Emil Abossolo-Mbo
- Étienne Chicot
- Éva Darlan
- François Marthouret
- François Rollin
- Frédérique Cantrel
- Gianni Giardinelli
- Guillaume de Tonquédec
- Jacques Boudet
- Jean Benguigui
- Jean-Marie Winling
- Jean-Yves Berteloot
- Joseph Malerba
- Judith El Zein
- Julien Courbey
- Laure Duthilleul
- Liane Foly
- Liliane Rovère
- Marianne Denicourt
- Marie-Christine Adam
- Martine Chevallier
- Michèle Laroque
- Michèle Moretti
- Natacha Amal
- Nicolas Vaude
- Nicole Calfan
- Olivier Martinez
- Pascale Arbillot
- Philippe Bas
- Riton Liebman
- Samir Guesmi
- Steve Suissa
- Thibault de Montalembert
- Yolande Moreau

== Episodes ==
=== Series 1 (1989) ===
1. La fille d'André (Andre's Daughter)
2. Le rouleau ne fait pas le printemps (The Roller Doesn't Make a Summer)
3. Fils de périph' (Peripheral wires')
4. Folie de flic (Cop Folly)

=== Series 2 (1990) ===
1. Strip Show
2. Barbès de l'aube à l'aurore
3. Mauvaise Action
4. Samouraï
5. Mort d'une fourmi
6. Cimetière des éléphants
7. Billets de sang
8. Salades russes
9. Méprise d'otages

=== Series 3 (1991) ===
1. Le bal des gringos
2. Comme des frères
3. Un mort sans avenir
4. Les chasses-neiges
5. À L'ami a la mort
6. Enlèvement demandé
7. Dans les cordes
8. Le collectionneur
9. Le clan des clandestins
10. La mariée est en rouge
11. Mort clinique

=== Series 4 (1992) ===
1. Mort d'un témoin
2. Le dernier Casino
3. L'étoffe de Navarro
4. Les enfants de nulle part
5. Le voisin du dessus

=== Series 5 (1993) ===
1. L'honneur de Navarro
2. Le contrat
3. Coupable je présume?
4. Froid devant
5. Crime de sang
6. En suivant la caillera
7. L'échange
8. Un visage d'ange
9. Triste Carnaval
10. Les gens de peu

=== Series 6 (1994) ===
1. Fort Navarro
2. Le choix de Navarro
3. Coups bas
4. Femmes en colère

=== Series 7 (1995) ===
1. Meurtre d'un salaud
2. Sanglante Nostalgie
3. Sentiments mortels
4. L'ombre d'un père
5. L'encaisseur
6. Les chiffonniers de l'aube
7. La trahison de Ginou
8. Le fils unique
9. Le cimetière des sentiments

=== Series 8 (1997) ===
1. Regrettable incident
2. Une femme à l'index
3. Le parfum du danger
4. Verdict
5. Un mari violent
6. Un bon flic

=== Series 9 (1998) ===
1. Pleure pas petit homme
2. Pas de grève pour le crime
3. La colère de Navarro
4. Secret
5. Suicide de flic
6. Avec les loups
7. Thomas l'enfant battue

=== Series 10 (1999) ===
1. Esclavage moderne
2. Bus de nuit
3. Sur ma vie
4. L'émeute
5. Meurtres en famille

=== Series 11 (2000) ===
1. Vengeance Aveugle
2. Jusqu'au bout de la vie
3. Une fille en flamme
4. Terreur à domicile
5. Promotion macabre
6. Mademoiselle Navarro
7. Ne pleurez pas Jeannette
8. La machination

=== Series 12 (2001) ===
1. Graines de Macadame
2. Le parrain
3. Délocalisation
4. La peau d'un mulet
5. Zéro pointé
6. Police Racket

=== Series 13 (2002) ===
1. Chute d'un ange
2. Marchand d'homme
3. Flics et Trafics
4. La revenante
5. Sortie autorisée
6. Voleur sans défense
7. Une Affaire Brûlante

=== Series 14 (2003) ===
1. Fascination
2. Le bourreau de l'ombre
3. La foire au sentiment
4. Ainsi soit-il

=== Series 15 (2004) ===
1. Manipulation
2. Double meurtres
3. Escort blues
4. Mortelle violence
5. Une femme au abois
6. La mort un dimanche
7. Au cœur du volcan
8. Jour de colère

=== Series 16 (2005) ===
1. Blessure profonde
2. Adolescence brisée
3. L'âme en vrac
4. Disparition
5. Famille blessée

=== Spin offs ===
1. Miss Navarro (2005) (Mademoiselle Navarro)
2. Squad Navarro (Brigade Navarro) (2006-2008)
