= Memoirs of a French Whore =

1979 film by Daniel Duval

- Theatrical poster
- Directed by: Daniel Duval
- Written by: Jeanne Cordelier; Christopher Frank; Daniel Duval
- Produced by: Gérard Lorin; Benjamin Simon
- Starring: Miou-Miou; Maria Schneider; Niels Arestrup
- Cinematography: Michel Cénet
- Edited by: Jean-Pierre Bonis
- Music by: Vladimir Cosma
- Production companies: ATC 3000; S.N. Prodis
- Distributed by: S.N. Prodis
- Release date: 17 October 1979
- Running time: 120 min
- Country: France
- Language: French
- Box office: $20.7 million

Memoirs of a French Whore (French: La Dérobade) is a French film released in 1979. It was directed by Daniel Duval. It stars Miou-Miou, Maria Schneider and Niels Arestrup.

== Plot ==
Marie is 19 and is bored in her little suburban life with no future. In a café, she meets Gérard, who is handsome, brown-haired, showy and smooth-talking, and has no trouble seducing her. Blinded by love and too susceptible, Mary decides to leave her parents and her job as a clerk to live with the man she considers as the love of her life. But Gerard is a pimp, who soon forces her into prostitution. First in a brothel, then in the street or in the Bois de Boulogne, the young woman gradually discovers a world of decay and violence.

== Cast ==
- Miou-Miou as Marie
- Daniel Duval as Gérard
- Maria Schneider as Maloup
- Niels Arestrup as André
- Jean Benguigui as Jean-Jean
- Martine Ferrière as Madame Pedro
- Brigitte Ariel as Odette
- Marie Pillet as Lulu
- Régis Porte as François
- Isabelle Mergault as a Prostitute
- Jean-Claude Dreyfus
- Brigitte Sy
