= Address Unknown (novel) =

Short novel by Kathrine Taylor

- Author: Kathrine Kressmann Taylor
- Language: English
- Genre: Epistolary novel, Historical fiction
- Publisher: Simon & Schuster
- Publication date: 1939
- Publication place: United States
- Media type: Print (hardcover & paperback)
- Originally published in Story magazine (1938)

Address Unknown is a 1938 short novel by Kathrine Taylor. The story, told entirely in letters between two German friends from 1932 to 1934, describes the rise of the Nazi Party and the growing acceptance of what would become the Final Solution in Germany and how the ideology had the power to profoundly change relationships.

== Plot ==
Martin returns to Germany from the United States with his family, exhilarated by the advances in the old country since the humiliation of the Great War. His Jewish business partner, Max, remains in the States to keep their art gallery running. Martin raves about the Third Reich and Hitler and at first, Max is covetous, envying his friend's return "to a democratic Germany... and the beginnings of a fine political freedom." He has misgivings, however, after hearing about violence against Jews and their businesses from those who have left Berlin. Martin dismisses his concerns, saying that Jews are the universal scapegoats and that "a few must suffer for the millions to be saved."

Martin asks Max to stop writing to him out of concern that, if a letter were to be intercepted, his family would be endangered. Max ignores this and continues writing. His sister Griselle, an actress, goes missing in Berlin and he becomes frantic to learn her fate; Martin responds that Griselle is dead. He admits turning her away when she came to him for sanctuary while she was being pursued by the Sturmabteilung. It is revealed that he and Griselle had previously been romantically involved. The contents of Max's letters change, now seemingly focused only on business and the weather, but the language he uses falsely implies that he is using a code. He refers to the exact dimension of pictures and to "our grandmother," implying that Martin is also Jewish. Martin responds, begging him to stop writing as he has been interrogated about each letter that arrives. Max again ignores him and eventually has one of his letters returned from Germany, marked "address unknown."

== Publication ==
Story published Address Unknown in 1938. It was released under the name Kressmann Taylor, as the editor Whit Burnett and Taylor's husband Elliott deemed the story "too strong to appear under the name of a woman." She used this name professionally for the rest of her life. The novella's appearance in Story was so popular that all copies of that month's issue sold out within ten days, and in an anecdote by Burnett, the demand was so high that pirated copies began to circulate in Hollywood. Reader's Digest soon reprinted the story and Simon & Schuster published it as a book in 1939, selling 50,000 copies. Foreign publications quickly followed, including a Dutch translation, later confiscated by Nazis, and a German one, published in Moscow. The book was banned in Germany.

The book's afterword, written by Taylor's son, reveals that the idea for the story came from Taylor's experience seeing those returning from Germany turn their backs on their Jewish friends. In 1995, Story Press reissued Address Unknown to mark the 50th anniversary of the liberation of the concentration camps. The story was subsequently translated into more than 20 languages, with the French version selling 600,000 copies. The book finally appeared in Germany in 2001 and was reissued in the United Kingdom in 2002. In Israel, the Hebrew edition was a best-seller and was adapted for stage. Taylor spent the final year of her life signing copies and giving interviews. The book was re-issued again in Ecco Press in 2021.

The title of the book is a mistranslation of the German Adressat unbekannt. Adressat is more equivalent to addressee than address.

== Adaptations ==
The novel was adapted into a film of the same name in 1944 and has been performed as a stage play in nearly 100 locations, including in France (2001), Israel (2002 onward), at the Promenade Theater in New York City (2004), Hungary (2008), at the Tron Theatre in Glasgow (2010), at the Koninklijke Schouwburg in the Hague (2011), at Soho Theatre in London (2013), at the Royal Danish Theatre in Copenhagen (2019), and at Vienna’s Konzerthaus in September 2025, performed by John Malkovich and August Zirner, mixed with orchestral music by J.S. Bach.

It has also been performed in Germany, South Africa, Italy, Turkey, Argentina, and in various American cities. In 2020, it was performed by Søren Sætter-Lassen and Lars Mikkelsen, followed by a debate and discussion on how Denmark acted towards Nazi Germany before the war. An adaptation for BBC Radio 4 was broadcast in June 2008 as an Afternoon Play. It starred Henry Goodman as Max and Patrick Malahide as Martin and was adapted and directed by Tim Dee. A dance production was put on by Gabrielle Lansner & Company in New York City in 2003.

It was adapted for Australian radio in 1940 starring Peter Finch.
