= Address Unknown (1944 film) =

1944 film directed by William Cameron Menzies

- Theatrical release poster
- Directed by: William Cameron Menzies
- Screenplay by: Herbert Dalmas
- Based on: Address Unknown (1938 novel) by Kressmann Taylor
- Produced by: William Cameron Menzies
- Starring: Paul Lukas
- Cinematography: Rudolph Maté
- Edited by: Al Clark
- Music by: Ernst Toch
- Color process: Black and white
- Production company: Columbia Pictures
- Distributed by: Columbia Pictures
- Release date: June 1, 1944
- Running time: 72 minutes
- Country: United States
- Language: English

Address Unknown is a 1944 American film noir drama film directed by William Cameron Menzies based on Kressmann Taylor's novel Address Unknown (1938). The film tells the story of two families caught up in the rise of Nazism in Germany before the start of World War II.

Cinematographer Rudolph Maté employed shadows, shapes and camera angles to create the imagery. One notable scene shows Martin Schulz (Paul Lukas) descending a staircase awaiting his arrest by the Gestapo, with the shadow of a web-like criss-cross of window panes behind him.

== Plot ==
Martin Schulz and Max Eisenstein (Morris Carnovsky) are good friends, German expatriate art dealers living in the United States. Martin's son Heinrich (Peter van Eyck) and Max's daughter Griselle (K.T. Stevens) are in love. When Martin and his wife return to Germany to find artwork, Griselle accompanies them to seek acting opportunities.

Martin meets Baron von Freische (Carl Esmond), joins the Nazi Party and becomes an important government official. Martin eventually insists that Max stop writing to him as Max is a Jew. When Max sends him a hand-delivered letter to confirm he is not acting under duress, Martin makes it clear they are no longer friends.

Griselle has been acting in Vienna under the stage name Stone when she lands the leading role in a play in Berlin. Before the premiere, the censor (Charles Halton) insists certain lines be cut (such as "Blessed are the peacemakers ...") as contrary to Nazi doctrine. On opening night, however, Griselle speaks the lines anyway. When the incensed censor makes her reveal her real name, it causes the antisemitic crowd to riot. The play's director hurries a still-defiant Griselle out of the theatre for her own safety.

Finally realising her danger, she seeks help from Martin at his country estate, but he refuses to give shelter and shuts the front door in her face. Several gunshots are heard. Martin's wife, Elsa (Mady Christians), is appalled by her husband's heartlessness. Max and Heinrich learn of Griselle's death in a short letter in which Martin states only that she is dead.

Martin receives a telegram informing him that Max will resume writing to him and that Martin will understand his messages. Martin finds Max's first letter incomprehensible, as it seems to be in code. Martin is warned that receiving coded messages is illegal. When letters continue to arrive, Martin is forced to resign his party position.

Elsa decides to take their children to Switzerland. Martin sends with her a letter appealing to Max to stop writing to him. The border guards see the letter, so Elsa destroys it before they can read it, raising suspicions further. Von Freische demands that Martin name his associates. When Martin persists in proclaiming his innocence, von Freische tells him that the Gestapo will question him. Martin is terrified. He considers suicide, but that night, he leaves his mansion by the front door. Thereafter, he is illuminated by a flashlight.

Back in San Francisco, a letter addressed to Martin is returned stamped "Address Unknown". A puzzled Max tells Heinrich that he had not resumed writing to his father. The reaction on Heinrich's face indicates that it was he who sent the letters.

== Cast ==
- Paul Lukas as Martin Schulz
- Carl Esmond as Baron von Freische
- Peter van Eyck as Heinrich Schulz (as Peter Van Eyck)
- Mady Christians as Elsa Schultz
- Morris Carnovsky as Max Eisenstein
- K.T. Stevens as Griselle Eisenstein aka Griselle Stone
- Emory Parnell as Postman
- Mary Young as Mrs. Delaney
- Frank Faylen as Jimmie Blake
- Charles Halton as Censorial Pipsqueak
- Erwin Kalser as Stage Director
- Frank Reicher as Professor Schmidt
- Dale Cornell as Carl Schulz
- Peter Newmeyer as Wilhelm Schulz
- Larry Olsen as Schulz Boy (as Larry Joe Olsen)
- Gary Gray as Hugo Schulz

== Critical reception ==
New York Times noted a change in the ending from the book had the preview audience "sitting bolt upright in their seats", and described the film as, "not just another anti-Nazi picture. It is an absorbing study of a man being driven crazy through fear." William Cameron Menzies was praised for highlighting the "tragic atmosphere" of the film "through the brilliant use of lowkey lighting effects" and by building tension by "cloaking the greater part of the story in deep, brooding, shadowy photography."

Sara Hamilton of Photoplay wrote, "Had Address Unknown been made immediately after the release of the exciting magazine story from which it was taken, it undoubtedly would have been the masterpiece it now attempts to be. But its message of hate and disintegration of character through Nazism has by now been told so often from the screen, even the brilliant characterization by Paul Lukas (and what an actor) fails to lift it to the heights at which it was aimed. Regardless, it's a fine picture, beautifully done and expertly acted by Lukas." Discussing the other cast members, Hamilton commented, "K. T. Stevens, as the daughter of the non-Aryan partner who suffers through Paul Lukas's fevered Hitlerism, is an accomplished performer… Peter Van Eyck as the son is an actor that shows great promise. Mady Christians as the wife of Lukas is a brilliant actress. Morris Carnovsky as the bewildered partner of Lukas and Carl Esmond as the German who leads Lukas into his hell of hate are both good."

E. A. Cunningham, writing for Motion Picture Herald, also commented on the increased awareness of Nazism since the publication of the book, saying the story "has lost some of its timeliness in the intervening years of war with the Axis. It remains tense drama, and should draw a considerable audience from readers of the story and the widening group of Lukas' admirers." He continued with comments about some of the personnel, stating, "William Cameron Menzies, who produced and directed the film, chose his cast with care and kept the entire presentation in a somber key. Performances are restrained and generally excellent. Morris Carnovsky … and Mady Christians … are particularly impressive, Rudolph Maté's photography is suitably artistic, often with dramatic effect."

The Film Daily wrote that the film deserved to be widely seen as it "is particularly constructive and timely." Much of the review focussed on the high standard of performances given by Paul Lukas and K.T. Stevens. They wrote, "In addition to the asset of Lukas' presence in the cast, the film may well prove a histrionic [sic] milestone since it introduces one of the "best bets" for full-fledged stardom in Hollywood - the capable K. T. Stevens."

A 2012 Time Out review referenced the novella "which sensationally exposed the Nazi threat back in 1938", but felt that the author’s intent became "somewhat tangled in a Jacobean revenge plot about two old friends." It continued, "Lukas' portrayal of a man haunted by guilt … almost edges the film into noir territory. It's often heavy-handed, but fascinating for the way Menzies (abetted by Rudolph Maté's lighting and expressionist touches) designs the film as though he had Things to Come in mind."

== Academy Award nominations ==
Morris Stoloff and Ernst Toch were nominated for the Academy Award for Best Original Score, and Lionel Banks, Walter Holscher and Joseph Kish were nominated for Best Art Direction.
