= Shadow of the Castles =

1977 film

- Theatrical release poster
- Directed by: Daniel Duval
- Written by: Daniel Duval
- Produced by: Michel Seydoux
- Starring: Philippe Léotard
- Cinematography: Pierre Lhomme
- Edited by: Jean-Bernard Bonis
- Music by: Maurice Vander
- Distributed by: NPF Planfilm
- Release date: July 1977
- Running time: 90 minutes
- Country: France
- Language: French

Shadow of the Castles (French: L'ombre des châteaux) is a 1977 French drama film written and directed by Daniel Duval. It was entered into the 10th Moscow International Film Festival where it won the Silver Prize.

== Cast ==
- Philippe Léotard as Luigi
- Albert Dray as Rico
- Zoé Chauveau as Fatoun
- Marcel Dalio as Père Renard (as Dalio)
- Stéphane Bouy as Le jeune avocat
- Yves Beneyton as Le chef motard
- Martine Ferrière as La mère supérieure
- Jean Puyberneau as L'avocat
- Louise Chevalier as La réligieuse
- Jean-François Chauvel as Le président du Tribunal
- Philippe Duval as Le père Capello
- Clara Boulet as Le mère Capello
