= Pierre Gérald =

French actor (1906–2012)

- Born: Victor Haim Cohen; 26 May 1906; Paris, France
- Died: 24 March 2012 (aged 105); Levallois-Perret, France
- Occupation: Actor
- Years active: 1954-2007

Pierre Gérald (26 May 1906 – 24 March 2012) was a French actor who acted professionally in theater, movies and television series for over 50 years.

== Early life ==
Born in Paris on 26 May 1906 into a family of diamond dealers, Gérald entered show business in 1954 as a stage actor. His stage career lasted almost 50 years, with his last final appearance in 2002 in La Traversée de Samuel R. (The Crossing of Samuel R).

== Career ==
In 1961, Gerald made his screen debut in the French television series L'inspecteur Leclerc enquête. This was followed by series such as Les dossiers de Jérôme Randax, Der kleine Doktor and La maison des autres. In 1980 Gérald appeared in his first film La bande du Rex.

Gerald continued to act well into his 90s and centennial years appearing in films and TV. He was in the Canal+ comedy series H set in a hospital in a Paris suburb as well as the TV series Highlander in 1992. In 2005 he appeared as the grandfather in the comedy Les poupées russes (Russian Dolls). At the time of his death on 24 March 2012 he was considered to be the oldest living working actor. His last film credit was in 2007, at the age of 101. This was in the romantic film Ensemble, c'est tout (Hunting and Gathering) directed by Claude Berri that starred Audrey Tautou and Guillaume Canet.

== Filmography ==
Year	Title	Role	Notes
1980	La bande du Rex		
1981	Pétrole ! Pétrole !	Le Président	
1990	La Discrète	Scientist	
1991	A Day to Remember	Lucien	
1991	My Life Is Hell	Dimitri	
1991	A Star for Two		
1993	Fanfan	Le vieux monsieur	
2000	Tout est calme	Isaac	
2000	Le Roi danse	Boesset	
2001	Grégoire Moulin contre l'humanité		
2002	A+ Pollux	Le vieux monsieur agressé	
2002	Monique	Un vieil homme à l'hospice	
2003	Toutes les filles sont folles	Le monsieur âgé	
2003	La vie nue	Le grand-père	
2005	Russian Dolls	Grand-père	
2007	Hunting and Gathering	Gilbert	
