= My Life Is Hell =

- Theatrical release poster
- Ma vie est un enfer
- Directed by: Josiane Balasko
- Written by: Josiane Balasko; Joël Houssin
- Produced by: Farid Chaouche
- Starring: Josiane Balasko; Daniel Auteuil
- Cinematography: Dominique Chapuis
- Edited by: Catherine Kelber
- Music by: Les Rita Mitsouko
- Distributed by: AMLF
- Release date: 4 December 1991
- Running time: 105 minutes
- Country: France
- Language: French
- Box office: $8.8 million

My Life Is Hell (French: Ma vie est un enfer) is a 1991 French comedy film directed by Josiane Balasko.

== Plot ==
Leah Lemonnier (Josiane Balasko), 35, leads a dreary and depressing life between her work as the secretary of a dentist who spends his time reprimanding her, her analyst (Richard Berry) who sees in her only a source of income, her neighbor, Mr. Chpil, a sexually obsessed party animal (Jean Benguigui) and her mother (Catherine Samie), nymphomaniac, selfish, greedy, narcissistic and contemptuous. But one day, she unwittingly invokes the devil. He has the face of a handsome devil, Abar (Daniel Auteuil), who offers her a deal: He will be at her service until her death in exchange of her soul.

Leah signs the pact and turns into a dream creature to seduce her shrink. The pact is soon canceled by the intervention of the archangel Gabriel, who is moved by the naivety of the young woman. He tells Abar that he got the wrong prey, who was supposed to be Leah's mother. Gabriel cancels the agreement and takes all power away from Abar. But Leah begins to find Abargadon attractive and decides to save his soul. She pleads in his favor and the archangel accepts provided that Abar does not commit any sin for a period of several weeks.

Leah and Abar live in a seedy hotel. During a fire at the hotel, Abargadon saves a child but Leah is on the verge of death, poisoned by smoke. Abargadon decides to save her by giving her a blood transfusion. By this gesture, the archangel Gabriel decides to save his soul and makes him human.

A few months later, Leah, who has become demon, is at the head of a pharmaceutical company. She comes upon Abar robbing the business in order to steal patents. She offers a contract to Abar, now mortal, against his soul. Taking advantage of prior knowledge, he negotiates a favorable contract: a long life of carnal love between him and his love.

== Cast ==
- Josiane Balasko - Leah Lemonnier
- Daniel Auteuil - Abargadon
- Richard Berry - Xavier Langsam
- Michael Lonsdale - Gabriel
- Catherine Samie - Flo Lemonnier
- Jean Benguigui - Mr. Chpil
- Luis Rego - Pazou
- Catherine Hiegel - Lilith
- Ticky Holgado - El Diablo
- Bertrand Blier - The priest
- Marilou Berry - The little girl
- Alexandre Desplat - The pianist
- Pierre Gérald - Dimitri
- Joël Houssin - Gorilla archangel Gabriel
- Bruno Moynot - The realtor

== Parodies ==
This film mocks:

- Insurance companies and their clauses written in small print;
- Psychoanalysis: The analyst writes his shopping list whilst his client tells him about her life; when she asks him to consider her financial situation, he explains that the amount of money is part of therapy; when his client takes revenge on him, Richard Berry sends up Freud’s terminology.

== Release ==
The film sold 1,170,523 tickets at the box office in France. In 1993, it was presented at the Adelaide Film Festival in Australia.
