= Kathrine Taylor =

American writer (1903–1996)

- Born: Kathrine Kressmann; August 19, 1903; Portland, Oregon
- Died: July 14, 1996 (aged 92); Hennepin County, Minnesota
- Education: University of Oregon
- Occupations: Author, novelist
- Notable work: Address Unknown

Kathrine Kressmann Taylor or Kressmann Taylor (1903 in Portland, Oregon – 14 July 1996) was an American writer, known mostly for her Address Unknown (1938), a short novel written as a series of letters between a Jewish art dealer, living in San Francisco, and his business partner, who had returned to Germany in 1932. It is credited with exposing, early on, the dangers of Nazism to the American public.

== Life ==
Kathrine Kressmann moved to San Francisco after graduating from the University of Oregon in 1924 and worked as an advertising copywriter. In 1928, Kressmann married Elliott Taylor, who owned an advertising agency. Ten years later, the couple moved to New York, where Story magazine published Address Unknown. The editor Whit Burnett and Elliot deemed the story "too strong to appear under the name of a woman," and published the work under the name Kressmann Taylor, dropping her first name. She used this name professionally for the rest of her life. Reader's Digest soon reprinted the novel, and Simon & Schuster published it as a book in 1939, selling 50,000 copies. Foreign publications followed quickly, including a Dutch translation, later confiscated by Nazis, and a German one, published in Moscow. The book was banned in Germany.

An indictment of Nazism was also the theme of Taylor's next book, Until That Day, published in 1942. In 1944, Columbia Pictures turned Address Unknown into a movie. The film director and production designer was William C. Menzies (Gone with the Wind), and Paul Lukas starred as Martin. The screenplay, written by Herbert Dalmas, was credited also to Kressmann Taylor. In Russian, there was another screenplay by David Greener, but it was never filmed.

From 1947, Taylor taught humanities, journalism and creative writing at Gettysburg College, in Pennsylvania, and, when Elliot Taylor died in 1953, lived as a widow. Retiring in 1966, she moved to Florence, Italy and wrote Diary of Florence in Flood, inspired by the great flood of the Arno river in November of that year. In 1967, Taylor married the American sculptor John Rood. Thereafter, they lived half a year in Minneapolis, Minnesota, and half in Val di Pesa, near Florence. Taylor continued this style of living after her second husband's death in 1974.

In 1995, when Taylor was 91, Story Press reissued Address Unknown to mark the 50th anniversary of the liberation of the concentration camps. The story was subsequently translated into 20 languages, with the French version selling 600,000 copies. The book finally appeared in Germany in 2001, and was reissued in Britain in 2002. In Israel, the Hebrew edition was a best-seller and was adapted for the stage. There has already been over 100 performances of the stage show, and it was filmed for TV and broadcast on the occasion of Holocaust Memorial Day, January 27.

Rediscovered after Address Unknown's reissue, Taylor spent a happy final year signing copies and giving interviews until her death at age 92.

== Works ==
=== Address Unknown (1938) ===
Martin, a gentile, returns with his family to Germany, exhilarated by the advances in the old country since the humiliation of the Great War. His business partner, Max, a Jew, remains in the States to keep the business going. The story is told entirely in letters between them, from 1932 to 1934.

Martin writes about the "wonderful" Third Reich and a man named "Hitler." At first Max is covetous: "How I envy you! ... You go to a democratic Germany, a land with a deep culture and the beginnings of a fine political freedom." Max soon however has misgivings about his friend's new enthusiasms, having heard from eyewitnesses who had gotten out of Berlin that Jews were being beaten and their businesses boycotted. Martin responds, telling Max that, while they may be good friends, everybody knows that Jews have been the universal scapegoats, and "a few must suffer for the millions to be saved."

"This Jew trouble is only an incident," Martin writes. "Something bigger is happening." Nonetheless, he asks Max to stop writing to him. If a letter were intercepted, he (Martin) would lose his official position and he and his family would be endangered.

Max continues to write regardless when his own sister, Griselle, an actress in Berlin, goes missing. He becomes frantic to learn her fate. Martin responds on bank stationery (less likely to be inspected) and tells Max his sister is dead. He admits that he turned Griselle away when she came to him, her brother's dearest friend, for sanctuary – she had foolishly defied the Nazis and was being pursued by SA thugs. (It is revealed earlier in the book that Martin and Griselle had had an affair before the events of the book take place.)

After a gap of about a month, Max starts writing to Martin at home, carrying only what looks like business and remarks about the weather, but writing as though they have a hidden encoded meaning, with strange references to exact dimensions of pictures and so on. The letters refer to "our grandmother" and imply that Martin is also Jewish. The letters from Munich to San Francisco get shorter and more panicky, begging Max to stop: "My God, Max, do you know what you do? ... These letters you have sent ... are not delivered, but they bring me in and ... demand I give them the code ... I beg you, Max, no more, no more! Stop while I can be saved."

Max however continues, "Prepare these for distribution by March 24th: Rubens 12 by 77, blue; Giotto 1 by 317, green and white; Poussin 20 by 90, red and white." The letter is returned to Max, stamped: Adressat unbekannt. Addressee Unknown. (The title of the book is actually a mistranslation of Adressat unbekannt: The correct translation of "Adressat" is "addressee," not "address"; which is much more in keeping with the plot of the story.)

The book's afterword, lovingly written by Taylor's son, reveals that the idea for the story came from a small news article: American students in Germany wrote home with the truth about the Nazi atrocities, a truth most Americans, including Charles Lindbergh, would not accept. Fraternity brothers thought it would be funny to send them letters making fun of Hitler, and the visiting students wrote back, "Stop it. We’re in danger. These people don’t fool around. You could murder [someone] by writing letters to him." Thus emerged the idea of "letter as weapon" or "murder by mail."

Address Unknown was performed as a stage play in France, 2001, in Israel from 2002 (where it still runs) and at the Promenade Theater in New York in 2004. It has also been performed in Germany, Italy, Denmark, Sweden, Turkey, Argentina, South Africa and in various other US cities. Address Unknown (Cimzett Ismeretlen) premiered on the stage of Spinoza Haz in Budapest, Hungary on September 6, 2008 and was performed in the Tron Theatre Glasgow as part of the Mayfesto season from 15 to 22 May 2010. It was performed at the Koninklijke Schouwburg in the Hague in the Netherlands in May 2011. In 2013 it was brought to the Soho Theatre in London.

An adaptation for BBC Radio 4 was broadcast in June 2008 as an Afternoon Play. It starred Henry Goodman as Max and Patrick Malahide as Martin and was adapted and directed by Tim Dee.

=== Until That Day (1942) ===
The novel recounts the story of Karl Hoffmann, a young German Christian and son of a Lutheran pastor. Hoffman starts his theology studies in Berlin in the late 1920s. Germany is still in a depression following its defeat in World War I, and this situation is the soil from which Nazism's influence grows. Hitler comes to power and starts persecutions against the Church, which refuses to preach the Nazi doctrine. Karl's father resists the authorities, and this resistance becomes the cause of his death. Karl, in his turn, continues his father's struggle and takes a stand against the Nazi takeover of the Church. He decides to become a pastor himself, but his ordination is denied. His life becomes endangered, and he escapes to the United States.

The novel is also based on the life of a real person, Leopold Bernhard. Kathrine Taylor met him through the mediation of the FBI, which had investigated the young German after his defection to the United States.

== Selected works ==
Taylor's published writings encompass 21 works in 107 publications in 18 languages and 2,220 library holdings.

=== English ===
Works by Kathrine Kressmann Taylor:
Address Unknown. HarperCollins, 2002. ISBN 0-7322-7616-0
Address Unknown. Washington Square Press, 2001. ISBN 0-7434-1271-0
Address Unknown. Story Press, 1995. ISBN 1-884910-17-3
Diary of Florence in Flood. Simon & Schuster, 1967
Florence: Ordeal by Water. H. Hamilton, London, 1967. ISBN 0-241-91438-8
Day of No Return. Xlibris, 2003. ISBN 1-4134-1181-9
Until That Day. Duell, Sloan & Pierce, 1945
Until That Day. Simon & Schuster, 1942

=== German ===
Kressmann Taylor, Adressat unbekannt. Roman. Hoffmann und Campe, Hamburg, 2000. ISBN 3-455-07674-2
Kressmann Taylor, Bis zu jenem Tag. Roman. Hoffmann und Campe, Hamburg, 2003. ISBN 3-455-07675-0

=== French ===
Kressmann Taylor, Inconnu à cette adresse. Éditions Autrement, 1999
Kressmann Taylor, Ainsi mentent les hommes. Recits.
Kressmann Taylor, Jour sans retour. Éditions Autrement, 2001

=== Hebrew ===
Kressman Taylor, Ma'an Lo Yadua. Zmora Bitan Publishers, Israel, 2001, trans. by Asher Tarmon.
In 2002 the Hebrew text was adapted for the stage by Avi Malka. The Kibbutz Theatre Company produced the play and actors. By the summer of 2007, the play had been performed in Israel 150 times and it was filmed by Israel Public TV Channel 1 for screening on Holocaust Remembrance Day in 2004.

=== Catalan ===
Kressmann Taylor, Adreça desconeguda. La Magrana, 2001. Translated by Ernest Riera.

=== Esperanto ===
Kressmann Taylor, Kathrine, Nekonata adresito. La KancerKliniko, Thaumiers, 2018, trans. by Claude Gerlat.

=== Hungarian ===
Kressmann Taylor, Kathrine, Címzett ismeretlen. Ab Ovo, Budapest, 2010 · ISBN 9789639378780 · Trans. by Marianne Kiss

Kressmann Taylor, Kathrine, Címzett ismeretlen. XXI. Század, Budapest, 2022 · ISBN 9789635682645 · Trans. by Ágnes Katona
