= John Rood (artist) =

- Born: 22 February 1902; Athens, Ohio
- Died: 1974 March 20; Minnesota
- Known for: Sculpture
- Style: abstract, folk
- Spouse(s): Mary Lawhead; Dorothy Bridgman; Kathrin Taylor

John Rood (February 22, 1902 – March 20, 1974) was an American sculptor who worked with wood, stone, glass, and metal.

== Early life and career ==
John Rood was born on February 22, 1902, in a log cabin in Luhrig Ohio—a small town outside Athens, Ohio to George D. and Frances Snedden Rood. His father died when he was 2. He was largely self supported and starting helping with the family finances at the age of eight. By thirteen years old he had a job as a stenographer. He worked hard at school and was able to graduate from high school, even organizing and conducting the school's first orchestra. Throughout his life he was very influenced by music and believed in "the power of music to give vigor to the sculptor's work."

In addition to music he was also very interested in writing. He published a poem in a publication called Shadowland in 1921. He wrote many short stories and novels, including This, My Brother which was published in 1935.

When Rood was seventeen he met Murray Sheehan who was then the head of the Department of Journalism at the University of Arkansas. This relationship was pivotal to Rood's life because later when Rood was 25 Sheehan introduced him to a wealthy family in Washington D.C. This family hired Rood as a secretary and took Rood with them to Europe in 1927-1928 where he studied the piano with Emil Kartun, met Gertrude Stein, and married Mary Lawhead.

Rood worked for the family business—Lawhead Press—and with Mary co-edited and published a literary magazine titled "Manuscript" that ran for a few years in the 1930s. Rood and Lawhead were married until the 1940s when they then divorced.

In 1944 Rood was contacted by Laurence Schmeckebier who was the head of the Fine Arts Department at the University of Minnesota and was asked if he would be interested in joining the staff to teach sculpture. Rood accepted and began his teaching career at the University of Minnesota. He was there until 1964, becoming professor emeritus in 1957.

In 1948 Rood married Dorothy Bridgman A. Rood and together they did a lot of philanthropic endeavors for the city of Minneapolis, the University of Minnesota, and other places connected to Bridgman including building a sculpture collection. This collection began with a purchase of David Smith's Star Cage in 1952.

Rood was an active member of various artists groups including the Minnesota Art Association, the Society of Minnesota Sculptors, the Columbus Art League and was president of Artist Equity Association in 1959.

In 1967 Rood married Kathrin Kressman after meeting her in Florence, Italy. Kressman was a writer who published under the name Kathrine Kressmann Taylor. Together they traveled extensively keeping homes in Florence, Italy, the West Indies, Minnesota, and Athens, Ohio.

== Sculpture ==
In 1933 Rood started wood carving in Athens, Ohio and it wasn't long before he had his first one-person exhibit at Argent Galleries, in New York in 1937. His style began with a large bulky folk style and themes of everyday people and animals and he later moved to abstract and simplified forms. According to one review, his early work seemed an "extension of whittling, have a provincial, 'local' flavor" and his abstract work was invocative of nature and man. Rood was creating shapes that resembled "human limbs and tree branches, seaweed and driftwood, wave and flame."

Some of the materials he worked with over the years included: marble, limestone, terra cotta, metal, glass, and wood carvings of ebony, walnut, oak, elm and myrtle. He started working with wood and over time incorporated other materials. After 1950 he started working with metal and incorporated glass into his work after 1953. He even worked with Styrofoam. His process was detailed in a New York Times article: "Styrofoam disappears under flame, and Mr. Rood not only carves it away with flame but modifies its texture with heated tools. The deteriorated plastic is then encased in a plaster mold except for orifices in which molten bronze is poured. The plastic vaporizes much as wax flows off in the old lost wax process. Mr. Rood may also introduce bits of rope or other material that does not leave too much ash; he has had to train his own technician for such casting. The resultant image is suggestive of the disruption and decay of matter and is often spectral in character."

Rood's second wife Dorothy Bridgman graduated from Wellesley college in 1910 and Rood created two sculptures for the campus in the 1950s, Persephone and Demeter which were some of the first sculptures added to the campus.

Rood completed a set of wood panel sculptures depicting American pioneer women for the headquarters of the American Association of University Women in Washington D.C.

For the Minneapolis Public Library building at 300 Nicollet Mall Rood created a 27 foot high, 13 ton art piece titled The Scroll. The building housed the library from 1961 to 2002 and this piece of art was for its opening and was commissioned in 1959. It is an S-shaped scroll consisting of 54 sheets of copper and bronze. At the time, Rood's wife Dorothy was the president of the library board and she donated the sculpture in dedication to William Henry Eustis. Eustis was a lawyer and political figure who financed Dorothy's college education and encouraged her to "love Minneapolis and do things for it."

=== Bridgman Court ===
The gateway peppered with stone panels was a gift from Rood's wife, Dorothy Bridgman and her brother Donald Bridgman to Hamline University. The panels depicted the schools 100-year history. Bridgman's Court is a memorial to George Henry Bridgman (1841–1931) and Mary Elliot Bridgman (1853–1938), the parents of Dorothy and Donald. George Henry Bridgman was the fifth president of Hamline from 1883 to 1912. Rood worked with Chicago architectural firm Holabird and Root to develop the final plans for the site. It consists of four main panels depicting the four main phases of liberal arts education - social studies, humanities, fine arts, and natural sciences. There are also ten smaller carvings with text.

== Collections ==
- "The Silent People" aka "The Mountaineers" at the Ohio University Kennedy Museum of Art
- Minneapolis Institute of Art (Mia)
- Walker Art Center, Minneapolis
- Weisman Art Museum, Minneapolis
