= Alex Métayer =

French humorist

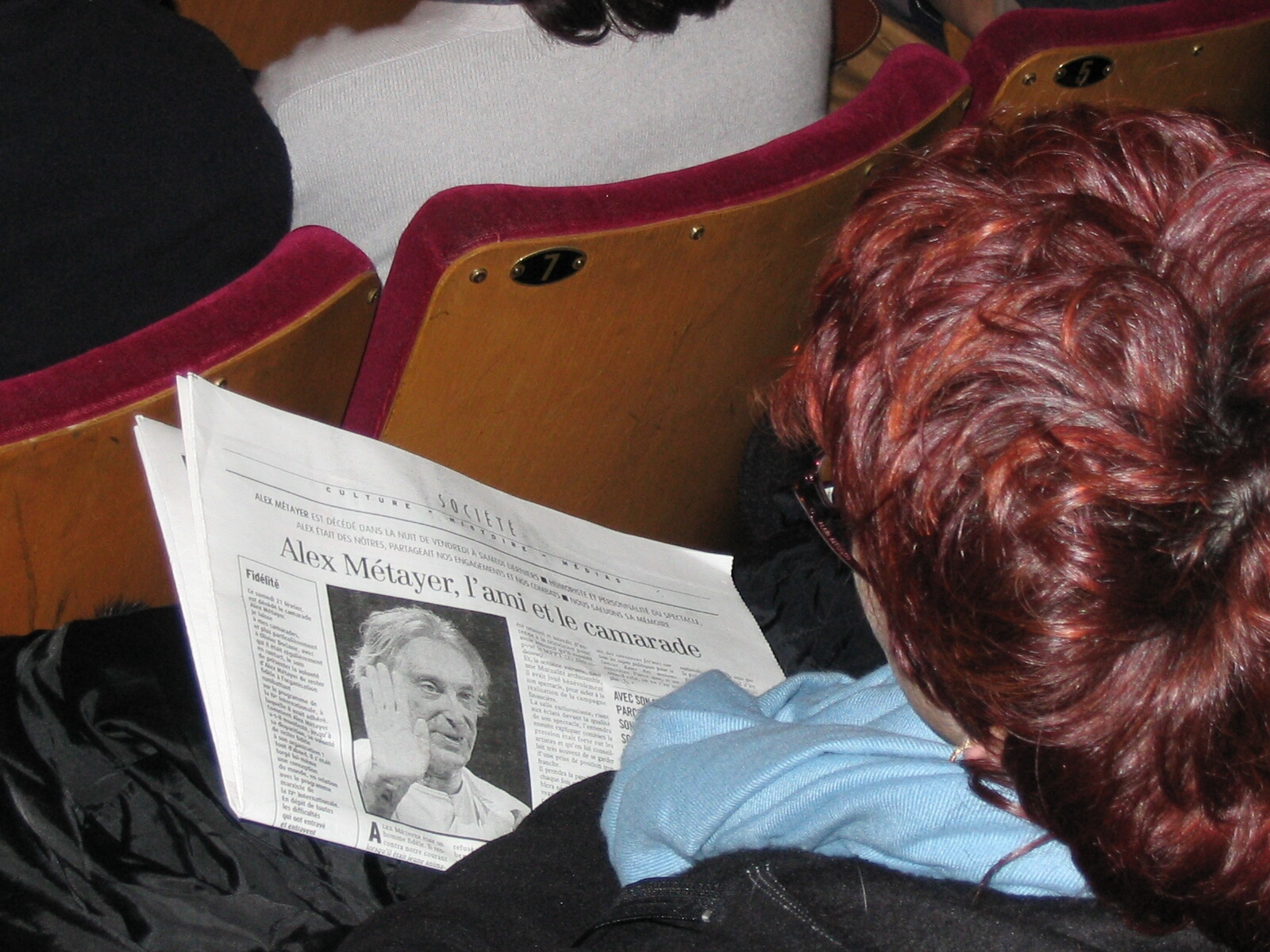

Alex Métayer (1930–2004) was a French humorist.

Alex Métayer in 1962
