= Medeea Marinescu =

Romanian actress

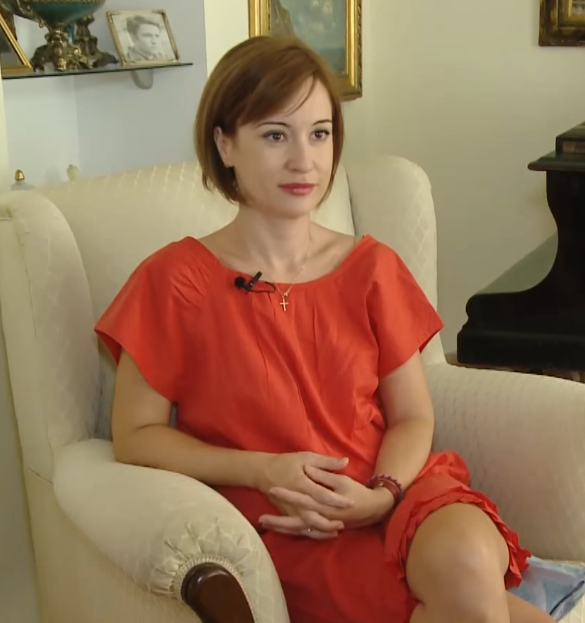
- Born: 27 May 1974 (age 50); Bucharest, Romania
- Occupation: Actress

Medeea Ana-Maria Marinescu (born 27 May 1974 in Bucharest) is a Romanian film actress. She played the role of Elena in the French films "Je vous trouve très beau"(2006) and Silvia in "Donnant Donnant" (2010)

Medeea Marinescu debuted at the age of only 3 in the film Iarna bobocilor (1977) by director Mircea Moldovan, but became well known and recognized after playing the main role, Mirabela, in the fantasy film Maria Mirabela (1981) by Ion Popescu Gopo and of Natalia Bodiul. Her parents worked in cinematography: her father, Ion Marinescu, was a camera operator, and her mother was a cinema make-up artist. Graduated in 1996 from the Bucharest Theater and Film Academy, in the class of professor Florin Zamfirescu, Medeea Marinescu acted in several films, and in the 2009-2010 season of the Bucharest National Theater she acted in four plays, one of which is The Egoist by Jean Anouilh
