= René Victor Pilhes =

French author and publicist (1934–2021)

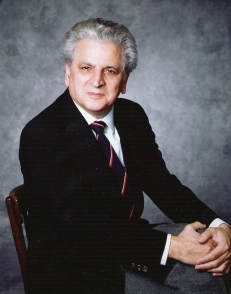
- Rene Pilhes in 1985
- Born: 1 July 1934; Paris, France
- Died: 6 February 2021 (aged 86)
- Occupation: Novelist
- Writing career
- Language: French
- Genres: Novel, essay
- Notable works: Books: L'Imprécateur (Novel 1974); La Rhubarbe (1965), Le Loum (1969), La Pompéi (1985), Les Démons de la cour de Rohan (1987), La position de Philidor (1992); Film adaptations: L'Imprécateur (1977); La Faux (2003)
- Notable awards: Literary prizes : Prix Médicis 1965 for La Rhubarbe; Prix Fémina 1974 for L'Imprécateur; Grand Prix de la ville de Nancy 1989 for La Médiatrice; Prix de la littérature policière Edmond Locard 1992 for La Position de Philidor
- Website: pilhes.fr

René Victor Pilhes (1 July 1934 – 6 February 2021) was a French writer and publicist.

Pilhes began working as an advertising executive at Air France and then at Publicis as a creative director and executive board member. He later devoted himself entirely to literature, viewing society through the lens of a moralist.

He was also a director of TF1.

He married Nicole Ingrand on 19 December 1959, and they had three children: Nathalie, Laurent, and Maria.

His best-known work is The Curse.

== Biography and literary works ==
=== Family background and youth: the natural child of the Ariège ===
René Jean Laurent Pilhes (pronounced "Pills") came from old families of the Ariège. His great-uncle Victor Pilhes was a deputy in the Second Republic, and he has added that name to his own since his first novel. Pilhes grew up in the Seix region, and the mountains and villages of Ariège influenced many of his novels. An illegitimate child, he was raised by his maternal grandmother. Illegitimacy is also the subject of his first novel, Rhubarb. He attended middle school (collège) in Saint-Girons, high school in Toulouse, and then the Lycée Buffon in Paris, where he earned his baccalaureate. In June 1955, he was sent to Algeria where he became a midshipman and lieutenant after his classes. He stayed there until September 1957 and left marked by the experience.

=== Debut novelist: author publicity ===
On his return from Algeria, René began working shift work (en trois-huit) for Air France as a commercial agent, and became politically engaged. He campaigned for the CGT, supported Pierre Mendès France, and joined the Unified Socialist Party (PSU). With Jean-Jacques Servan-Schreiber, he founded the Alumni Association of Algeria.

He married, and his career evolved; in the early 1960s, Pilhes was still a copywriter at Air France. He then worked at Dorland and Gray before becoming a copywriter at Publicis. He kept his distance from politics and increasingly felt his need to write, especially after the death of his maternal grandmother. His first novel, Rhubarb, appeared in 1965 and was awarded the Prix Médicis. Originally titled The Bastard, the novel follows its narrator, Urban Gorenfan (also known as Aubain Minville), as he relates his quest for identity of a young man not recognized by his father, who seeks to know how the child would have been if he had been legitimate. The facts of the book were invented even though the context of history could be likened to an autobiography. Pilhes also transformed it into a baroque novel with extraordinary adventures. "Take the high ground, do not fear what dictates the imagination, take care of the balance between reality and fiction, these are my constant concerns as a novelist."

In 1969, he published his second novel, The Loum, the climbing of whose phallic peak haunts the author's later writings. In this audacious novel with its salacious passages, His Excellency the Lord begins climbing this huge, skyward-pointing rocky spur with his elderly mother in a singular struggle. This book is also presented as a "psychoanalytic epic". René Victor Pilhes says of it: "The Loum is the story of a terrible battle between mother and son. [...] I will, once and for all, demonstrate to you that I am much more powerful than my father and all the men you admired in your life." The book was the subject of a public lecture in Geneva and is included in the anthology of erotic literature by Jean-Jacques Pauvert.

=== 1974: The Curse ===
The Curse (L'Imprécateur) was a milestone in the writer's life, as he now devoted himself fully to literature. The topics in The Curse differed from the rest of Pilhes' work, but its slapstick and fantasy elements were similar to those in his earlier works."The author has shifted his gaze from the abdomen of his mother, his unknown father, and some others to the "bottom" of society which he was a contemporary." This novel won the Prix Femina and is a best-seller with 390,000 copies sold. Warmly received by critics, he denounced the failings of the economy, where the unbridled pursuit of profit replaces virtue. Mysterious curses shake the Rosserys and Mitchell company, in the minds of its managers as well as its foundations and direction.

A film, directed by Jean-Louis Bertucelli, was made in 1977.

After the election of Valéry Giscard d'Estaing to the presidency, he kept up with politics, joined the Socialist Party and actively campaigned in the following years. His fourth novel, The Beast (1976), is more politically engaged than earlier works. It explores the coercive excesses that occur when a group of young people from an Ariège village attempt to oppose a rally of the Advanced Liberal Youth: "to shun violence is one thing in a democracy; to approve the hunting of active minorities is another."

=== Pilhes in the years 1980–1990 ===
In 1981, in Wounds and Bumps, resulting from interviews with Maurice Chavardes, he took stock of his career, re-distanced himself from politics and announced the writing of several novels. He completely abandoned the business world until 1986 (transition to TF1 and Havas).

He resumed writing assiduously: nine works appeared between 1985 and 1999. He took a moralistic view of the shortcomings of a society affected by the evils of economic liberalism, the darkness of the past or political machinations. The Pompeii (1985) brings back the dark days of the Occupation and its sequel The Demons of the Court of Rohan (1987) addresses the issue of leftism of the 1970s and its shift into terrorism. In 1988 The Hitler appeared, which aroused some controversy. It tackles the difficult problem of antisemitism in the late twentieth century. In the context of the Israeli–Palestinian conflict, he argued that the new antisemitism disguised itself as anti-Zionism. The Fakir (1995) brings back the Algerian past of the master pollster Lenoyer (torture, methods of pacification), a period of which there is silence, whose vicissitudes have serious consequences even today. In Christ (1997) the inhabitants of a village, guardians of the last vestiges of Cathar, see their tranquillity disrupted by the arrival of an American scientific expedition.

In 1989 The Ombudsman denounced the excesses of the TV world. It portrays ephemeral stars desperately trying to survive publicly on board a dangerously pitching ship. The subject of corporate executives still interested Pilhes. Philidor's position (1992), a detective novel that details ambitious young professionals going to a mountain village where a crime occurs. The following year, he published The Scythe (La Faux), which narrates the last days of a finance magnate who rediscovers the traditional activities of his reaper ancestors. A television adaptation was to be made in 2003.

In his latest novel Henbane (1999), Aubain Minville and Urban Gorenfan, the heroes of Rhubarb, reappear in an investigation into the murder of a young anti-nuclear activist.

=== The author's style ===
He began by writing two novels that were never published. In Wounds and Bumps, he says in this connection to Maurice Chavardes: "I started writing at the age of twenty. About illegitimacy of course. But then, it was really autobiographical. I could not cope. Then on my return to Algeria, I wrote an essay on that war. [...] I could not face up to my illegitimacy and tell it: 'I am not interested at all in you. [...] You interest me locked up, submissive, naked, open, panting, frightened, hungry, behind the bars of literary creation.'" It is this reality, reinterpreted through a burlesque prism, that marks his writing style.

Some characters' names are recurring, such as Nomen, Lenoyer, Gorenfan, Minville. The narrator is sometimes called Pilhes but changes his identity and profession in the various novels. The Ariege and peaceful villages are often part of the adventures of its hero, in the shadow of Loum.

JP Damour analyses Pilhes' writing noting his fondness for the winks, the use of narrative platitudes and psychoanalytic clichés (cf. Rhubarb and The Loum): "It arises from the accumulation process ostensibly a baroque composition, often parodic, which sometimes turns the main characters' quest into a sort of epic slapstick."

=== Later life ===
Pilhes eventually retired and spent his time surrounded by his six grandchildren.

He did not publish in his last ten years but was still writing the third part of Loum announced long beforehand: "The Loum is not finished. It includes only two parts out of three: the ambiguous (Pride and Outrage) and the tense (Humor and Mood). The lost part remains to be written."

Concerned about the literary legacy he would leave, and willing to defend and promote knowledge of his work, René maintained a blog in which he reported on some critics who had praised him during his career and delivered some keys to reading his novels. He developed and organized his archives with the help of his grandson, Arsene.

Of the controversy around The Hitler, twenty years after its release, Pilhes said he has been accused of anti-Semitism and as a result has been subject to legal attack. In the dictionary of Jérôme Garcin, in his own written record just after The Hitler, he justified himself thus: "the author wanted to show a sample of what would be a neo-antisemitic speech. [...] Because it seemed as if we were not careful, fifty years after the Holocaust, we would run right into this situation. [...] The author has done this unequivocally, without ulterior motives, in order to serve democracy and tolerance. But the Jewish community does not believe or pretends not to believe it. [...] Worse he is accused of antisemitism. What more can he do? We must think about it. And weigh what is left behind."

== Publications ==
- Rhubarb (1965)
- The Loum (1969)
- The Curse (1974) Editions du Seuil
- The Beast (1976)
- The Whole Truth (1980)
- The Pompeii (1985)
- Demons of the Court of Rohan (1987)
- The Hitler (1988)
- The Mediator (1989)
- The Philidor Position (1992)
- The Fake (1993)
- The Fakir (1995)
- The Christi (1997)
- Henbane (1999)

== Films ==
- The Fake (2003)
- The Curse (1977)

== Essays ==
- "There is a slightly fanciful competition between chess and literature", Chess in Europe, No. 296, August–September 1983, pp. 14–16.

== Literary awards ==
- Prix Médicis (1965) for Rhubarb
- Prix Femina (1974) for The Curse
