= Souris noire =

- Starring: Vanessa Guedj
- Music by: Alain Le Douarin
- Country of origin: France
- Original language: French
- No. of episodes: 20

Production
- Running time: 13 minutes

Original release
- Release: 1987

Souris noire is a French children's drama and adventure television series that originally aired on FR3 from 1987 to 1989. The series ran for two seasons, with a total of twenty episodes.

== Synopsis ==
The series follows Marion (played by Vanessa Guedj), a clever and resourceful teenage girl, who operates under the alias "Souris noire" (Black Mouse). Using her intelligence, problem-solving skills, and determination, she investigates various mysteries and strange occurrences in her neighborhood. Throughout the series, she uncovers hidden secrets, deciphers complex puzzles, and outwits many criminals.
