= You Are So Beautiful (film) =

- Directed by: Isabelle Mergault
- Screenplay by: Isabelle Mergault
- Produced by: Jean-Louis Livi
- Starring: Michel Blanc; Medeea Marinescu; Wladimir Yordanoff; Éva Darlan; Valérie Bonneton
- Cinematography: Laurent Fleutot
- Edited by: Colette Beltran; Marie-Josèphe Yoyotte
- Music by: Bob Lenox; Alain Wisniak
- Production companies: Gaumont; Film Par Film; France 2 Cinéma
- Distributed by: Gaumont Columbia TriStar Films
- Release date: 7 November 2005
- Running time: 95 minutes
- Country: France
- Language: French
- Budget: $6.7 million
- Box office: $25.3 million

You Are So Beautiful (French title: Je vous trouve très beau) is a French comedy film released in 2005 by the Gaumont company. It is written and directed by Isabelle Mergault and includes a cast of Michel Blanc, Medeea Marinescu, Wladimir Yordanoff, Benoît Turjman, Éva Darlan and Elisabeth Commelin.

== Plot ==
Aymé Pigrenet, a grumpy farmer from Drôme, has just lost his wife in a domestic accident. He didn't really care for his wife, but she was very useful for working on the farm and taking care of the house. He urgently needs to find a new woman to help him with his chores because he can't cope alone anymore.

Not knowing how to find a wife, he signs up with a marriage agency. The manager advises him to go to Romania, where the girls are ready to do anything to escape their poverty. He brings back Elena, a young Romanian woman who hides from Aymé the fact that she has a little girl, Gaby. Aymé pretends to his family that she is a distant relative of his deceased wife, who came to France for an internship on his farm.

Incapable of kindness, Aymé quickly plunges Elena into melancholy and nostalgia for her country. Elena's efforts to seduce him are in vain, and the couple seems hopeless. Realizing he risks losing her, Aymé resolves to make an effort; he buys her an engagement ring, but when he returns to the farm with the intention of giving it to her, Elena is in tears, and the timing is off. Wanting to cheer her up, he withdraws all his savings from the bank and gives them to Elena, making her believe she has won the treble. He has mourned the end of their relationship, blaming Elena for her inability to work properly on the farm, and lets her leave for Romania the next day. Alone again, Aymé quickly becomes melancholic and clings to memories of their relationship.

Back in her country, Elena uses the money to open the dance school of her dreams. Coming across the French newspaper from the day of her departure, she discovers that the winning treble from the day before does not match the numbers she played. Understanding Aymé's gesture of love, she returns to find him for good, this time accompanied by Gaby.

== Cast ==
- Michel Blanc as Aymé Pigrenet
- Medeea Marinescu as Elena
- Wladimir Yordanoff as Roland Blanchot
- Benoît Turjman as Antoine
- Éva Darlan as Madame Marais
- Liliane Rovère as Madame Lochet
- Elisabeth Commelin as Françoise
- Valérie Bonneton as Lawyer Labaume
- Julien Cafaro as Thierry
- Arthur Jugnot as Pierre
- Valentin Traversi as Jean-Paul
- Raphaël Dufour as Nicolas
- Isabelle Mergault as The taxi driver

== Release ==
The film premiered at the "Sarlat Film Festival" on 7 November 2005. It was also screened at the Marrakech International Film Festival on 13 November 2005. On 14 June 2006, the film was projected at the Seattle International Film Festival.

== Accolades ==
Year	Award	Category	Recipient	Result
2007	César Awards	Best Original Screenplay	Isabelle Mergault	Nominated
2007	César Awards	Best Actor	Michel Blanc	Nominated
2007	César Awards	Best First Feature Film	Isabelle Mergault	Won
2007	Lumière Awards	Best Actor	Michel Blanc	Nominated
2007	Love is Folly International Film Festival	Best Actor	Michel Blanc	Won
