= Isabelle Mergault =

French actress and film director (1958–2026)

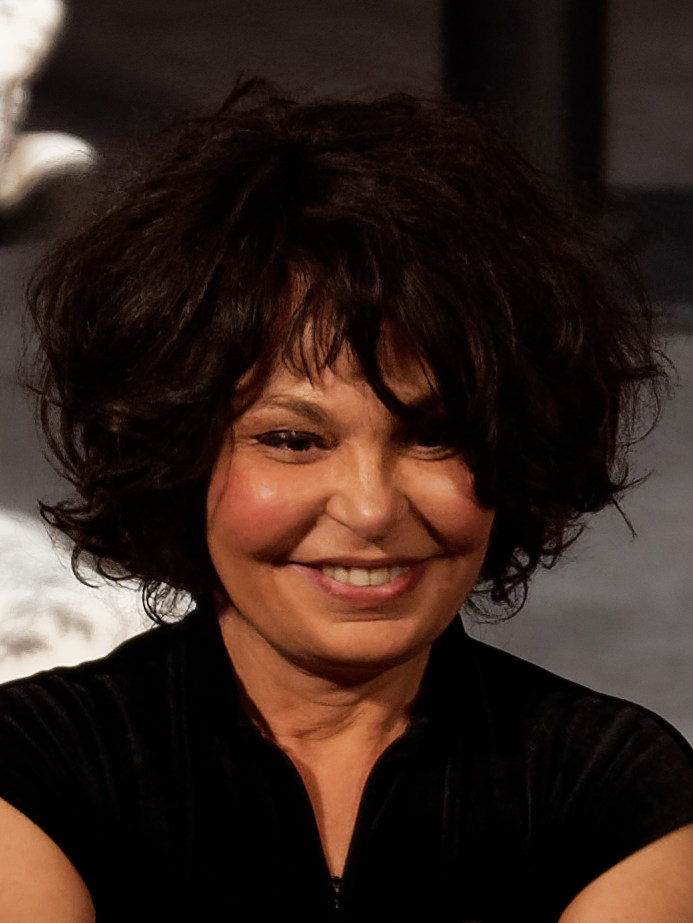
- Mergault in 2019
- Born: 11 May 1958; Paris, France
- Died: 20 March 2026 (aged 67); Neuilly-sur-Seine, France
- Occupations: Actress, director, writer, television and radio personality
- Years active: 1979–2026
- Children: 2

Isabelle Mergault (11 May 1958 – 20 March 2026) was a French actress, director, writer, and television and radio personality.

== Life and career ==
Isabelle Mergault was born in Aubervilliers, Seine-Saint-Denis, near Paris, on 11 May 1958.

She died in Neuilly-sur-Seine in the morning on 20 March 2026, at the age of 67, following a battle against cancer.

She was a regular participant of the widely popular radio show Les Grosses Têtes with Philippe Bouvard, between 1988 and 1998 and with Laurent Ruquier since 2014.

== Filmography ==
=== Actress ===
Year	Title	Role	Director	Notes
1979	Memoirs of a French Whore	A prostitute	Daniel Duval	
1980	L'entourloupe	Jeanine	Gérard Pirès	
1980	Mais qu'est-ce que j'ai fait au Bon Dieu pour avoir une femme qui boit dans les cafés avec les hommes ?	The waitress	Jan Saint-Hamont	
1980	La grossesse de Madame Bracht	Vevette	Jean-Roger Cadet	TV film
1980	Les amours de la belle époque	Blanche	Jean-Paul Roux	TV series (1 episode)
1981	Diva	The game girl	Jean-Jacques Beineix	
1981	Men Prefer Fat Girls	Paul's lover	Jean-Marie Poiré	
1981	On n'est pas des anges... elles non plus	The stewardess	Michel Lang	
1981	Samantha		Victor Vicas	TV film
1982	Pour cent briques, t'as plus rien...	Ginette	Édouard Molinaro	
1982	Le Choc	The bank employee	Robin Davis	
1982	Ça va faire mal	Gina	Jean-François Davy	
1982	Le divan	The friend	Lazare Iglesis	TV film
1982	Toutes griffes dehors		Michel Boisrond	TV mini-series
1982	Les brigades du Tigre	Dolly	Victor Vicas (2)	TV series (1 episode)
1983	Vous habitez chez vos parents ?	Andromaque	Michel Fermaud	
1983	Ça va pas être triste	Zsa-Zsa	Pierre Sisser	
1984	Asphalt Warriors	The prostitute	Sergio Gobbi	
1984	Stress	Isabelle	Jean-Louis Bertucelli	
1985	Next Summer	Isabelle	Nadine Trintignant	
1985	Blanche et Marie	Odette	Jacques Renard	
1985	P.R.O.F.S.	Caroline	Patrick Schulmann	
1985	L'amour ou presque		Patrice Gautier	
1985	Cinéma de minuit	The girl	Patricia Bardon	Short
1985	Les amours des années 50	Carole	Jean-Paul Roux (2)	TV series (1 episode)
1985	Les Bargeot		Jean-Pierre Barizien	TV series (1 episode)
1986	Sauve-toi, Lola		Michel Drach	
1986	Espionne et tais-toi		Claude Boissol	TV series (1 episode)
1987	Agent trouble	The waitress	Jean-Pierre Mocky	
1987	Club de rencontres	Bunny	Michel Lang (2)	
1987	Lévy et Goliath	Charlotte	Gérard Oury	
1987	Il est génial papy !	Zaza	Michel Drach (2)	
1987	Sale destin		Sylvain Madigan	
1987	Septième ciel		Jean-Louis Daniel	
1987	La lettre perdue	Annie	Jean-Louis Bertucelli (2)	TV film Also writer
1987	L'heure Simenon	Marie-Lou	Michel Mitrani	TV series (1 episode)
1987	Marie Pervenche	Dany	Claude Boissol (2)	TV series (1 episode)
1988	Une nuit à l'Assemblée Nationale	Fernande	Jean-Pierre Mocky (2)	
1988	L'autre nuit	The cop	Jean-Pierre Limosin	
1989	À deux minutes près	Tristan's maid	Éric Le Hung	
1989–91	Navarro	Miss Lulu	Patrick Jamain, Denys Granier-Deferre & Serge Leroy	TV series (8 episodes)
1990	Pacific Palisades	Sandrine	Bernard Schmitt	
1991	A Day to Remember	Elisa	Jean-Louis Bertucelli (3)	Also writer
1991	Les clés du paradis	The florist	Philippe de Broca	
1992	Le cerf-volant	Alexandra	Jean-Paul Roux (3)	TV film
2005	Je vous trouve très beau	The taxi driver	Isabelle Mergault	
2011	Le grand restaurant II	The prostitute	Gérard Pullicino	TV film
2017	C'est beau la vie quand on y pense		Gérard Jugnot	

=== Director / writer ===
Year	Title	Role	Box office	Notes
1987	La lettre perdue	Writer		TV film directed by Jean-Louis Bertucelli
1988	Souris noire	Writer		TV series (1 episode) directed by Jean-Louis Bertucelli (2)
1989	Les Aventures de Franck et Foo-Yang	Writer		TV mini-series directed by Jean-Louis Bertucelli (3)
1990	Série rose	Writer		TV series (1 episode) directed by Etienne Leduc
1991	A Day to Remember	Writer		Directed by Jean-Louis Bertucelli (4)
1992	Voyage à Rome	Writer	$1.5 million	Directed by Michel Lengliney
1993	Classe mannequin	Writer		TV series (3 episodes) directed by Dominique Masson
1996	Sans mentir	Writer		TV film directed by Joyce Buñuel
1997	Un printemps de chien	Writer		TV film directed by Alain Tasma
2000	Most Promising Young Actress	Writer	$14.4 million	Directed by Gérard Jugnot
2002	L'envolé	Writer		TV film directed by Philippe Venault
2005	Je vous trouve très beau	Director & writer	$24.7 million	César Award for Best First Feature Film; Nominated - César Award for Best Original Screenplay
2007	The Merry Widow	Director & writer	$22.7 million	
2010	Donnant donnant	Director & writer	$4.5 million	

== Theater ==
Year	Title	Author	Director	Notes
1981	Le divan	Remo Forlani	Max Douy	Théâtre La Bruyère
1985	Impasse-Privé	Christian Charmetant & Antoine Duléry	Michel Berto	Théâtre de l'Athénée
2003	La presse est unanime	Laurent Ruquier	Agnès Boury	Théâtre des Variétés
2005	Si c'était à refaire	Laurent Ruquier	Jean-Luc Moreau	Théâtre des Variétés
2008	Croque-monsieur	Marcel Mithois	Alain Sachs	Théâtre des Variétés
2011	L'Amour sur un plateau	Isabelle Mergault	Agnès Boury (2)	Théâtre de la Porte Saint-Martin
2012–13	Adieu je reste !	Isabelle Mergault	Alain Sachs (2)	Théâtre des Variétés
2014	Ouh Ouh	Isabelle Mergault & Daive Cohen	Patrice Leconte	Théâtre des Variétés
2015	Ne me regardez pas comme ça !	Isabelle Mergault	Christophe Duthuron	Théâtre des Variétés

== Radio/television ==
Year	Show	Radio/television	Notes
1988–98	Les Grosses Têtes	RTL	with Philippe Bouvard
1998–99	Rien à cirer	France Inter	with Laurent Ruquier
1999–2014	On va s'gêner	Europe 1	with Laurent Ruquier
2000–07	On a tout essayé	France 2	with Laurent Ruquier
2011–13	On n'demande qu'à en rire	France 2	with Laurent Ruquier
2014–2026	Les Grosses Têtes	RTL	with Laurent Ruquier
