= Jean-Claude Guiguet =

French film director

- Born: 22 October 1939; La Tour-du-Pin, France
- Died: 16 September 2005 (aged 65); Aubenas, France
- Occupations: Film director Screenwriter
- Years active: 1993–2005

Jean-Claude Guiguet (French: [gigɛ]; 22 October 1939 – 16 September 2005). was a French film director and screenwriter. He directed eight films between 1978 and 2005. His film Les passagers was screened in the Un Certain Regard section at the 1999 Cannes Film Festival.

== Filmography ==
- Les belles manières (1978)
- L'archipel des amours (1983)
- Faubourg St Martin (1986)
- Peinture fraîche (1991)
- Le Mirage (1992)
- Les passagers (1999)
- Métamorphose (2003)
- Portraits, traits privés (2005)
