= Daniel Duval =

French actor and film director

- Born: 28 November 1944; Vitry-sur-Seine, France
- Died: 10 October 2013 (aged 68); Paris, France
- Occupations: Actor, film director, screenwriter
- Years active: 1971–2013
- Spouse: Anna Karina (m. 1978; div. 1981)

Daniel Duval (28 November 1944 – 10 October 2013) was a French film actor, director and writer.

Best known as an actor, Duval has credits in over 70 television and film productions. As a filmmaker, Duval was awarded the Silver Prize at the 10th Moscow International Film Festival in 1977 for his drama film Shadow of the Castles, which he wrote and directed. In 2008 and 2010, he appeared in a recurring role during the second and third seasons, respectively, of the hit French TV drama Engrenages.

He was briefly married to Anna Karina, from 1978 to 1981.

== Selected filmography ==
- La ville bidon (1971) - Mario
- George Who? (1973) - Le soldat
- Le voyage d'Amélie (1974) - Dan
- Let Joy Reign Supreme (1975) - Le mirebalai
- L'agression (1975) - Un motard
- Ben et Bénédict (1977) - Rémi Peyrou
- Shadow of the Castles (1977)
- Va voir maman, papa travaille (1978) - Serge
- Le dernier amant romantique (1978) - Un candidat recalé
- Memoirs of a French Whore (1979) - Gérard aka "Gégé"
- The Story of a Mother (1979) - Døden
- Le bar du téléphone (1980) - Toni Véronèse
- L'amour trop fort (1981) - Charlie Maupas
- The Judge (1984) - Antoine Rocca
- Un été d'enfer (1984) - Commissaire Turielle
- Among Wolves (1985) - The Gitan
- Stan the Flasher (1990) - Le père de Natacha
- Nefertiti, figlia del sole (1995) - Monkutura
- Will It Snow for Christmas? (1996) - Le père
- Love, etc. (1996) - Yvon
- J'irai au paradis car l'enfer est ici (1997) - Bertrand Cardone
- Je ne vois pas ce qu'on me trouve (1997) - Marc Lelong
- Ça ne se refuse pas (1998) - Carbone
- Si je t'aime, prends garde à toi (1998) - Samuel
- Le vent de la nuit (1999) - Serge
- Le margouillat (2000) - L'avocat
- Total Khéops (2002) - Manu
- Gomez & Tavarès (2003) - Izenberg
- Time of the Wolf (2003) - Georges Laurent
- Process (2004) - L'amant
- À San Remo (2004) - Etienne
- Vendus (2004) - Pavel
- 36 Quai des Orfèvres (2004) - Eddy Valence
- Caché (2005) - Pierre
- Time to Leave (2005) - Le père
- Le temps des porte-plumes (2006) - Le psychologue
- A City Is Beautiful at Night (2006) - Le flic
- Jean de la Fontaine, le défi (2007) - Terron
- Gomez vs. Tavarès (2007) - M. Eisenberg
- The Grocer's Son (2007) - Le père
- 3 amis (2007) - Francis
- Le deuxième souffle (2007) - Venture Ricci
- Plus tard tu comprendras (2008) - Georges Gornick
- Les tremblements lointains (2008)
- District 13: Ultimatum (2009) - Walter Gassman
- How to Draw a Perfect Circle (2009) - Paul
- R.T.T. (2009) - Segal
- De vrais mensonges (2010) - Le père d'Émilie
- Beau rivage (2011) - Michel Matarasso
- Des vents contraires (2011) - Xavier, l'éditeur
- A Gang Story (2011) - Christo
- La vie pure (2014) - Tonton
- Kickback (2015) - Judge Martin (final film role)
