= Tim Dee =

Tim Dee is a British radio producer, television broadcaster, and author.

In 2018, he was elected as a fellow of the Royal Society of Literature.

== Books ==
- Landfill (Little Toller, 2018)
- The Running Sky (2009)
- Four Fields (2013)
- Greenery: Journeys in the Springtime (Jonathan Cape, 2020)
- Groundwork - editor
