= Jean-Louis Bertuccelli =

French film director

- Born: 3 June 1942; Paris, France
- Died: 6 March 2014 (aged 71)
- Occupations: Film director Screenwriter
- Years active: 1967–2014

Jean-Louis Bertuccelli (3 June 1942 – 6 March 2014) was a French film director and screenwriter. He died in March 2014, aged 71.

== Selected filmography ==
- Ramparts of Clay (1971)
- Docteur Françoise Gailland (1976)
- The Accuser (1977)
- A Day to Remember (1991)
- Sur un air de mambo (1996) TV Movie
