= Anémone =

French actress (1950–2019)

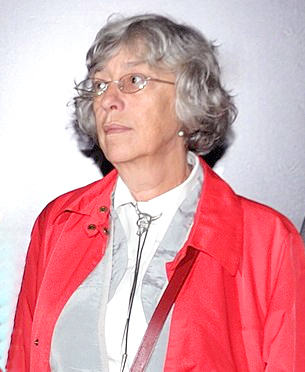
- Anémone at the premiere of Le Petit Nicolas at the Grand Rex in Paris, 2009
- Born: Anne Bourguignon; 9 August 1950; Paris, France
- Died: 30 April 2019 (aged 68); Poitiers, France
- Occupation: Actress
- Years active: 1968–2018

Anne Bourguignon (French pronunciation: [an buʁɡiɲɔ̃]; 9 August 1950 – 30 April 2019), known professionally as Anémone (pronounced [anemɔn]), was a French actress and political activist.

During the late 1970s and early 1980s, Anémone gained popularity in France by appearing in successful comedies, most notably Santa Claus is a Stinker (1982). In 1988, she won the César Award for Best Actress for her dramatic role in The Grand Highway. Anémone had a long and varied career in film and television, though from the late 1990s she worked mostly as a character actress.

== Early life ==
Born in Paris to an upper-class "progressive" family, Anne Bourguignon decided to become an actress with little opposition from her parents.

At the age of 16, following an education at a Catholic school where she was a rebellious student, she started mixing with Parisian entertainment circles.

== Career ==
Bourguignon made her film debut aged 18 by starring in the underground film Anémone, directed by her then-boyfriend Philippe Garrel. Though she was credited for that film under her real name, she later decided to use its title as her stage name.

Anémone next appeared in comedy plays, performing in café-théâtres, a French type of small theatre venue. In 1975, together with several fellow actors including Martin Lamotte and Gérard Lanvin, she created the theater La Veuve Pichard in Paris. In 1977, Coluche gave Anémone her first major role in a mainstream film, by casting her as the female lead in the comedy Vous n'aurez pas l'Alsace et la Lorraine. In 1979, she worked with the comedy troupe of Le Splendid, performing with them the play Le père Noël est une ordure (Santa Claus is a Stinker), which enjoyed great success.

During the early 1980s, Anémone played supporting, then starring roles in a series of comedy films, most of which were box-office successes. She often co-starred with members of Le Splendid with whom she became associated in the public eye. Anémone notably appeared with one or other troupe member in Je vais craquer (1980), Viens chez moi, j'habite chez une copine, Les Babas Cool (both 1981) Ma femme s'appelle reviens, Pour cent briques, t'as plus rien... and Le quart d'heure américain (all 1982). Also in 1982, she and the members of Le Splendid reprised their roles in the film version of Santa Claus is a Stinker, which was later regularly broadcast on French television and came to be regarded in France as a comedy classic. Anémone's performance in that film helped her become particularly popular with French audiences; her portrayal of the goofy, socially awkward spinster Thérèse became legendary for several generations of viewers.

Much later, Anémone had a public falling out with the former members of Le Splendid's troupe, claiming in interviews that she had been unfairly deprived of authors' rights and royalties for both the play and film versions of Santa Claus is a Stinker. After Anémone's death, former troupe member Marie-Anne Chazel clarified that Anémone had not been a co-author of the original play, nor had she been a formal member of the troupe.

In 1987, she starred in the war drama The Grand Highway, directed by Jean-Loup Hubert, for which she won the César Award for Best Actress the following year. Besides her acting work, Anémone was also known in France for her extraverted and unconventional personality, and her bluntness in interviews.

In 1994, Anémone starred in Tonie Marshall's quirky comedy Something Fishy. In later years, she mostly played supporting roles in film and on television, also returning to the theatre where she appeared in several successful plays during the 2000s and 2010s. In 2017, Anémone announced that she was retiring from acting; she later moved to a village in the Poitiers region.

== Personal life ==
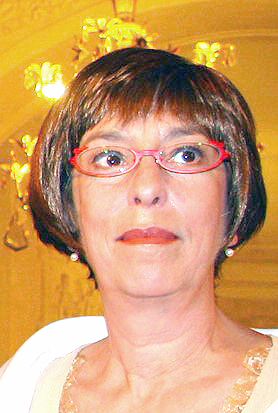
Anémone in 2006

For several years, Anémone was the partner of film director Philippe Galland. Their relationship began when she was six months pregnant with her son: Galland later raised the boy, Jacob, as his own son. Anémone and Galland had a daughter together, Lily.

Anémone long claimed that she did not know who her son's biological father was. Much later, Jacob underwent a DNA test that established his father was actor and director Pascal Aubier. Jacob had long known Aubier as a friend, with both noticing their mutual resemblance and joking about it.

Anémone was a committed environmentalist and regularly supported left-wing, anti-capitalist causes and candidates. In 1995, she was a candidate on an environmentalist list for the municipal elections in Paris. During the 2000s, she supported the activist organization ATTAC, also acting on occasion as a spokesperson for the group.

In her later years, Anémone split her time between France and Portugal, living there for half the year.

== Death ==
Anémone died of lung cancer on 30 April 2019, at the age of 68.

== Filmography ==
Year	Title	Role	Notes
1968	Anémone	Anémone	(first film role)
1969	Je, tu, elles...	Second applicant for the nanny position	
1970	La maison		
1975	Incorrigible	A prostitute	Uncredited
1975	Les Cinq Dernières Minutes	Various	TV series (3 episodes)
1976	Attention les yeux!	Eva	
1976	L'ordinateur des pompes funèbres	A secretary	
1976	Cours après moi ... que je t'attrape	The usher	
1976	Pardon Mon Affaire	The concierge	
1977	Le couple témoin	Claudine	
1977	Vous n'aurez pas l'Alsace et la Lorraine	Cousin Lucienne	
1978	Dirty Dreamer	Colette	
1978	Vas-y maman	The script	
1978	Les héritiers	Josée	TV series (1 episode)
1978	Le temps d'une République	Juliette	TV series (1 episode)
1978	Thomas Guérin... retraité	Emmanuelle	TV movie
1978	Cinéma 16	Manou	TV series (1 episode)
1979	Café follies	Gigi	TV movie
1979	O Madiana	Danièle	
1979	French Postcards	Christine	
1979	Rien ne va plus	Interviewed girl	
1980	Les 400 coups de Virginie	Marie-Ghyslaine	TV Mini-Series (1 episode)
1980	Certaines nouvelles	Marie-Annick	
1980	Médecins de nuit	Pregnant woman	TV series (1 episode)
1980	Je vais craquer	Liliane	
1980	The Wonderful Day	Deocadie	
1981	Viens chez moi, j'habite chez une copine	Adrienne	
1981	La guerre des insectes	Anaïs	TV movie
1981	La gueule du loup	Viviane	
1981	Les Babas Cool	Alexandra	
1982	Ma femme s'appelle reviens	Nadine Foulon	
1982	Pour cent briques, t'as plus rien...	Nicole	
1982	Le Père Noël est une ordure	Thérèse	
1982	Le quart d'heure américain	Bonnie	
1982	Merci Bernard	Various	TV series
1983	Un homme à ma taille	Babette	
1985	Le Père Noël est une ordure	Thérèse	TV movie
1985	Les Nanas	Odile	
1985	Tranches de vie	Cécile / Hélène	
1985	Death in a French Garden	Edwige Ledieu	Nominated - César Award for Best Supporting Actress
1985	Le mariage du siècle	Princess Charlotte	
1986	I Love You	Barbara	
1987	The Grand Highway	Marcelle	César Award for Best Actress
1987	Poule et frites	Béatrice	
1987	La sauteuse (de l'ange)	La mère	Short
1988	Envoyez les violons	Isabelle Fournier	
1988	Sans peur et sans reproche	Rose	
1989	Les baisers de secours	Minouchette	
1989	Twisted Obsession	Marianne	
1989	Zanzibar	Woman in orange	
1990	Maman	Lulu	
1990	Après après-demain	Isabelle	
1991	Les enfants volants	Suzanne	
1992	La Belle Histoire	Madame Desjardins	
1992	Loulou Graffiti	Juliette	
1992	Jeux de mort		Short
1992	Le Petit Prince a dit	Melanie	Nominated - César Award for Best Actress
1992	Ma soeur, mon amour	Laura Bécancour	
1993	Coup de jeune	Muriel	
1993	Poisson-lune	Anne	
1994	Aux petits bonheurs	Helene	
1994	Something Fishy	Maxime Chabrier	Nominated - César Award for Best Actress
1994	3000 scénarios contre un virus	The mother	TV series (1 episode)
1996	L'échappée belle	Jeanine	
1996	Enfants de salaud	Sylvette	
1996	Les Bidochon	Raymonde Bidochon	
1996	Le cri de la soie	Cécile	
1997	La cible	Clara	
1997	Marquise	La Voisin	
1998	Lautrec	Adèle de Toulouse-Lautrec	Nominated - César Award for Best Supporting Actress
1999	L'homme de ma vie	Solange	
2000	Passeurs de rêves	Catherine	
2001	Voyance et manigance	Jacqueline	
2001	Step by Step		
2002	Ma femme s'appelle Maurice	Claire Trouabal	
2004	C'est pas moi, c'est l'autre	Carlotta Luciani	
2005	La ravisseuse	Léonce	
2005	Voisins, voisines	Madame Gonzales	
2005	Vénus & Apollon	Anne-Marie Bourguignon	TV series (1 episode)
2006	La jungle	Mathias's mother	
2006	Bataille natale	Françoise Darcy	TV movie
2007	Mon homme	The commissioner	Short
2009	Le choix de Myriam	Simone	TV movie
2009	Fais pas ci, fais pas ça	Madame Fernet	TV series (4 episodes)
2009	Little Nicholas	Mademoiselle Navarin	
2010	Les amours secrètes	Margot	
2010	Sable noir	Marie	TV series (1 episode)
2010	Les Bougon	Aunt Louise	TV series (1 episode)
2010	Pauline et François	Hélène	
2010	Mademoiselle Drot	Madame Chambart-Martin	TV movie
2011	Le grand restaurant II	The widow	TV movie
2012	Bocuse	Micheline	Short
2012	Nuts	Dr. Vorov	
2013	Mortel été	Madame Spinelli	TV movie
2013	La Minute Vieille		TV series (1 episode)
2013	Como Quien No Quiere La Cosa	Mrs. Lesoufache	
2013	Malevil	Madame Menou	TV movie
2014	Jacky in Women's Kingdom	The General	
2014	Un si joli mensonge	Louise	TV movie
2014	Le grimoire d'Arkandias	Marion Boucher	
2015	I'm All Yours	The grandmother	
2015	Rosalie Blum	Simone Machot	
2015	The Roommates Party	Madame Abramovitch	
2018	Family Business	Tante Bertille	(final film role)

== Awards and nominations ==
List of awards and nominations
Year	Title of work	Award	Category	Result
1986	Death in a French Garden	César Award	Best Supporting Actress	Nominated
1988	The Grand Highway	César Award	Best Actress	Won
1993	Le Petit prince a dit	César Award	Best Actress	Nominated
1995	Something Fishy	César Award	Best Actress	Nominated
1999	Lautrec	César Award	Best Supporting Actress	Nominated
