= Paradise (1991 film) =

1991 film by Mary Agnes Donoghue

- Theatrical release poster
- Directed by: Mary Agnes Donoghue
- Screenplay by: Mary Agnes Donoghue
- Based on: Le Grand Chemin by Jean-Loup Hubert
- Produced by: Scott Kroopf; Patrick J. Palmer
- Starring: Melanie Griffith; Don Johnson; Elijah Wood; Thora Birch
- Cinematography: Jerzy Zieliński
- Edited by: Eva Gardos; Debra McDermott
- Music by: David Newman
- Production companies: Touchstone Pictures; Touchwood Pacific Partners I
- Distributed by: Buena Vista Pictures Distribution
- Release date: October 4, 1991
- Running time: 111 minutes
- Country: United States
- Language: English
- Box office: $18,634,643 (Domestic)

Paradise is a 1991 American drama film written and directed by Mary Agnes Donoghue, and starring Melanie Griffith, Don Johnson, and Elijah Wood. It is a remake of the French film The Grand Highway (Le Grand Chemin) by Jean-Loup Hubert.

The film follows a married couple torn apart by a family tragedy and accompanying a boy.

The film's original music score is composed by David Newman.

== Plot ==
Willard Young is a ten year old boy who goes going to a private school on a scholarship. However, for some reason he is afraid of everything around him. He has not seen his father for so long, he thinks he is away on sea duty. One day, his mother sends him to the small yet dull town. It turns out he is staying with an old friend of his mother's named Lily Reed and her husband Ben. While Willard is bored and out and about looking for something to do, he meets a nine year old girl named Billie Pike. She herself does not know who her father is or what he does, and has a mother who just cannot keep up with a relationship. But it is not long before Willard and Billie both become something neither one of them has ever really had or been: a best friend. While their friendship blossoms, Ben and Lily struggle come to terms with their own personal struggles. Years ago their infant son died accidentally, and they had been suffering ever since. Lily, in particular, has been unable to piece together her life since the tragedy, and even though Ben struggles get through to her, Lily is too entrenched in grief and guilt to respond. But stemming from the often endearing time that they both have been spending with Willard, they slowly begin to mend their relationship. Willard starts to come terms with his own fears, including the shattering truth that his father was never on sea duty, but had in fact left his mother for another woman. As for Billie, when she tries to make contact with a skating ring teacher whom she believes is her father, he flat out rejects her. Although her heart is broken, she must come to accept that she does not have a father anymore. They must learn this for themselves, all the while trying to find the one thing that leads to salvation and redemption: Paradise.

== Cast ==
- Melanie Griffith as Lily Reed
- Don Johnson as Ben Reed
- Elijah Wood as Willard Young
- Thora Birch as Billie Pike
- Sheila McCarthy as Sally Pike
- Eve Gordon as Rosemary Young
- Louise Latham as Catherine Reston Lee
- Greg Travis as Earl McCoy
- Sarah Trigger as Darlene
- Richard K. Olsen as Minister
- Rick Andosca as Ernest Parkett

== Reception ==
Paradise received mixed to negative reviews from critics, as it holds a 33% rating on Rotten Tomatoes from 12 reviews. Audiences polled by CinemaScore gave the film an average grade of "A−" on an A+ to F scale. Retrospectively, Director Mary Agnes Donoghue attributed the film's commercial failure in part to audiences' reluctance to see Johnson in such a role, but described his work as "the best performance, the most restrained performance, he's ever given." Later Don Johnson also spoke fondly of the film, calling it "a beautiful movie" and comparing it to Juno (2007) for its intimate nature.
