= Santa Claus Is a Stinker =

- Directed by: Jean-Marie Poiré
- Produced by: Yves Rousset-Rouard
- Starring: Anémone; Josiane Balasko; Marie-Anne Chazel; Christian Clavier; Gérard Jugnot; Thierry Lhermitte; Bruno Moynot
- Cinematography: Robert Alazraki
- Edited by: Catherine Kelber
- Music by: Vladimir Cosma
- Production companies: Trinacra Films; Films A2; Les Films du Splendid
- Distributed by: Compagnie Commerciale Française Cinématographique (CCFC); Groupement des Editeurs de Films (GEF)
- Release date: 25 August 1982
- Running time: 87 minutes
- Country: France
- Language: French
- Box office: $10.3 million

Santa Claus Is a Stinker (French: Le père Noël est une ordure, lit. 'Father Christmas is a scumbag', or 'Father Christmas is a shit') is a French comedy play created in 1979 by the troupe Le Splendid and turned into a film directed by Jean-Marie Poiré in 1982.

== Plot ==
Pierre, a stuffy and self-righteous volunteer at a telephone helpline for depressed people, and his well-meaning but naïve co-worker Thérèse, are stuck with the Christmas Eve shift in the Paris office, much to their displeasure.

The building's lift is malfunctioning, and they receive visits from unwanted callers: Katia, a depressed transvestite who tries to hit on Pierre; M. Preskovitch who lives in the same building and always turns up unexpectedly to offer them various unappetizing pastries; and Josette, a heavily pregnant woman on the run from her violent fiancé Félix who is trying to get her to come back home to cook the Christmas Eve dinner. However, what was supposed to be a calm working evening, quickly turns sour.

== The origin of the doubitchous ==
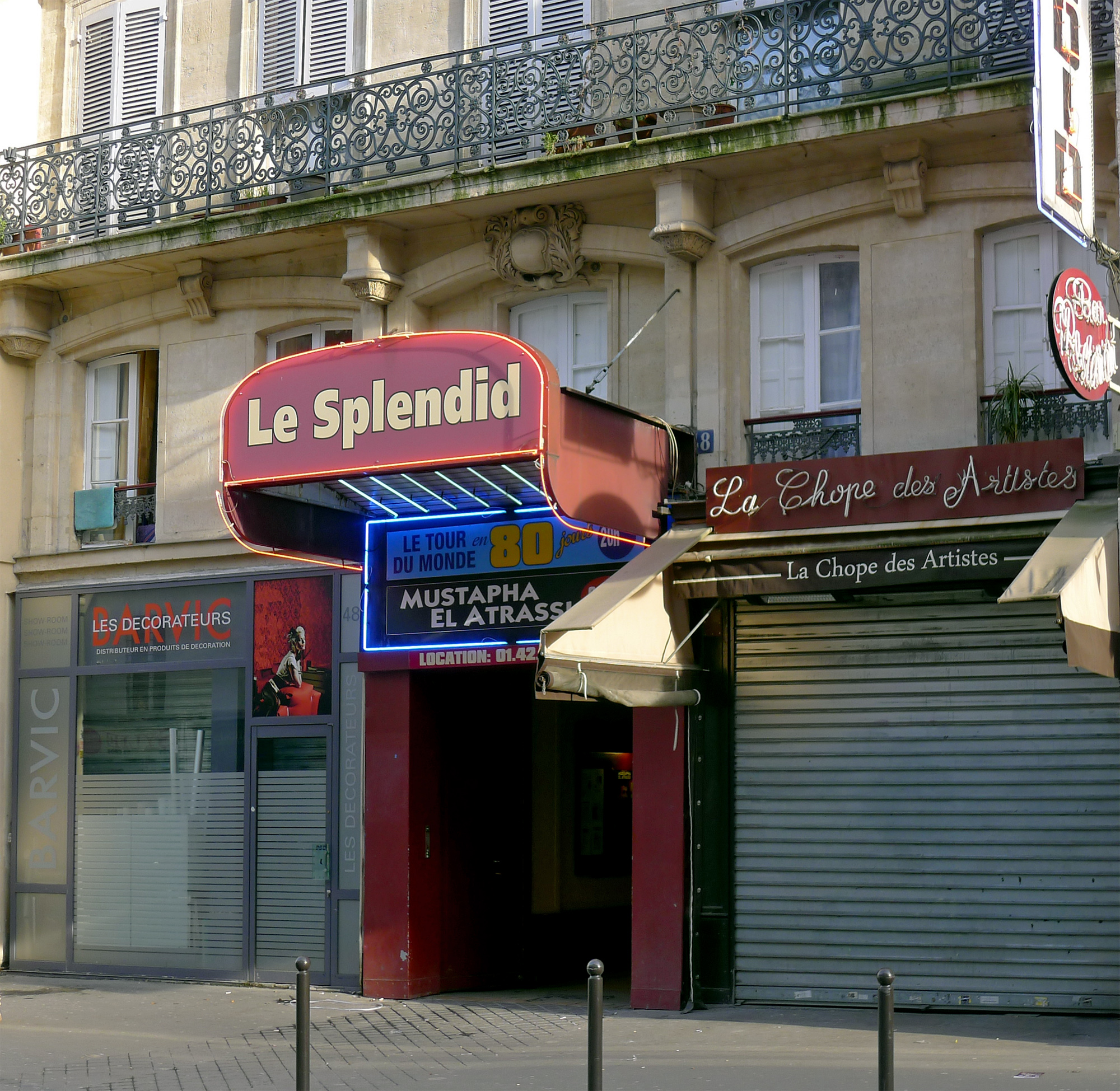
Le Splendid in 1979 is at the origin of the film of 1982.

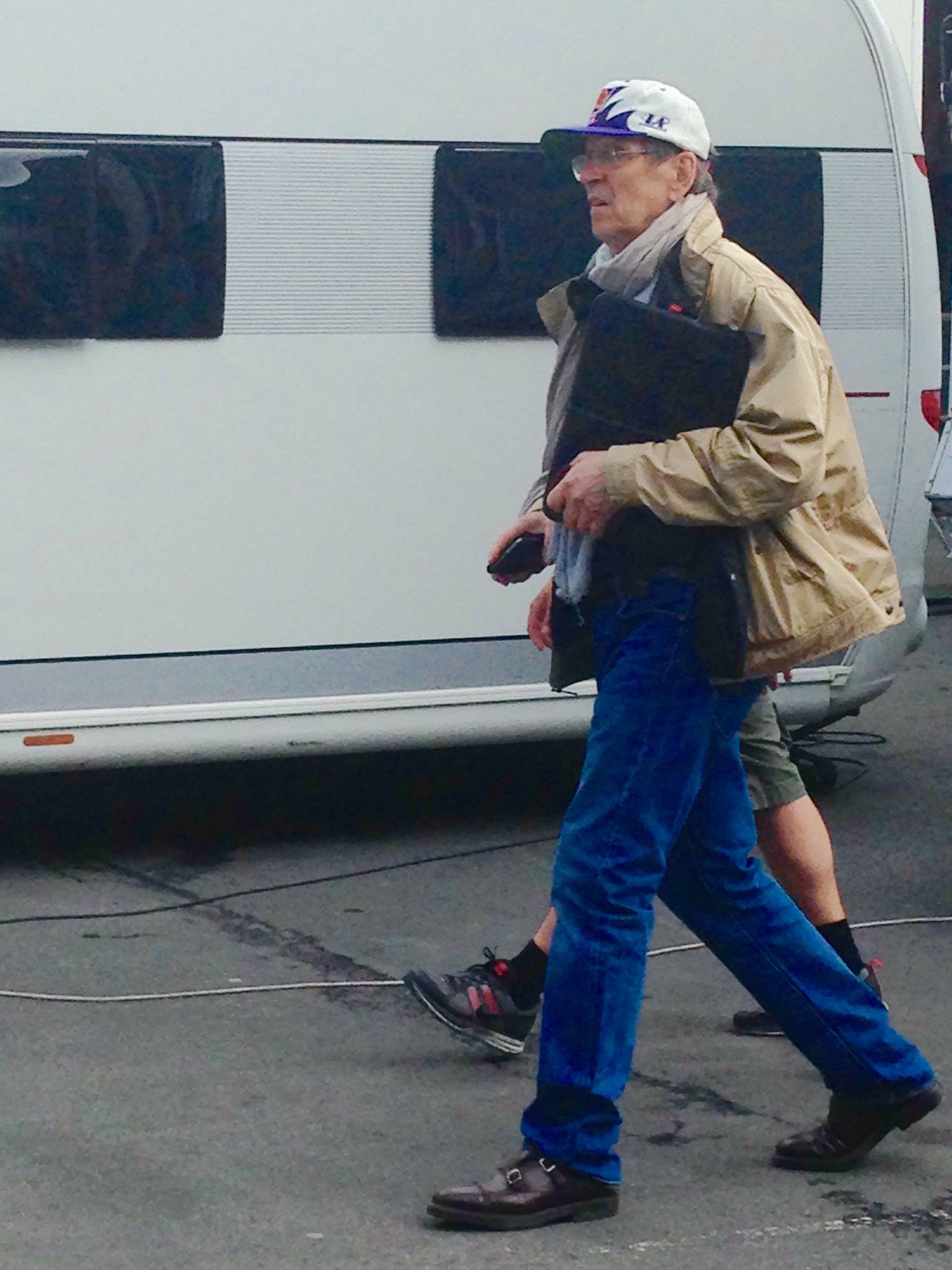
Jean-Marie Poiré directed the production of the film in 1982.

The pastries used in the film are a creation of Josiane Balasko who had travelled to Osijek, in Croatia, the birthplace of her father. During her stay the actress discovered funny local specialties which gave her the inspiration of the doubitchous of the film.

== The painting used in the film ==
The painting depicting Thérèse with a pig used in the film is different from the one used for theatre version of Le père Noël est une ordure. Two different artists have painted the two pieces: Bernard de Desnoyers and Christoff Debusschere.

Today the painting that was used to shoot the film is in the hands of its author, Bernard de Desnoyers, who has kept the work.

== English (US) remake of the film ==
In 1994 the basic plot was used by writer/director Nora Ephron to develop the US film Mixed Nuts.

== Cast ==
- Anémone as Thérèse
- Thierry Lhermitte as Pierre Mortez
- Marie-Anne Chazel as Josette
- Gérard Jugnot as Félix
- Christian Clavier as Katia
- Josiane Balasko as Madame Musquin
- Bruno Moynot as Preskovitch
- Jacques François as The Pharmacist
- Martin Lamotte as Monsieur Leblé
- Michel Blanc (voice only) as an obscene crank caller
