= Les Babas Cool =

1981 film by François Leterrier

- Directed by: François Leterrier
- Written by: Martin Lamotte; Philippe Bruneau
- Produced by: Yves Rousset-Rouard
- Starring: Christian Clavier; Philippe Léotard; Marie-Anne Chazel
- Cinematography: Jean-François Robin
- Edited by: Claudine Bouché
- Music by: Nino Ferrer
- Distributed by: Compagnie Commerciale Française Cinématographique (CCFC); Groupement des Editeurs de Films (GEF)
- Release date: 16 December 1981
- Running time: 90 minutes
- Country: France
- Language: French

Les Babas Cool is a French comedy film directed by François Leterrier. It was released in 1981. The film is also known under the alternate title Quand tu seras débloqué… fais-moi signe ! (lit. 'When you're less stuck... let me know !')

== Plot ==
Antoine Bonfils is a household appliance salesman. His car breaks down close to a farm. Looking for help, he figures out that the people there are living in a commune, like hippies.

== Cast ==
- Christian Clavier : Antoine Bonfils
- Philippe Léotard : Blaise
- Marie-Anne Chazel : Aline
- Martin Lamotte : Gilles
- Charlotte de Turckheim : Christine
- Paul Préboist : M. Triconet
- Catherine Frot : Véronique
- Nadia Barentin : Tania
- Sophie Renoir : Charlotte
- Richard Bohringer : Paul
- Anémone : Alexandra
- Bruno Moynot : Doctor Jean Morin

== About the film ==
The term "baba-cool", also spelled "baba cool" or "babacool' (from the Hindi baba 'daddy" and the English cool "calm"), is French for "hippie".

The film was shot between 18 June and 3 August 1981, mainly in the Alpes-de-Haute-Provence region: Forcalquier, Gréoux-les-Bains, Manosque, Reillanne and Simiane-la-Rotonde.

The film was not a box-office success, ending the year with just under 500,000 admissions3, half as many as François Leterrier's previous film starring Clavier, Je vais craquer, which ended the year with a million admissions.
