= Inspector Blunder =

- Directed by: Claude Zidi
- Written by: Claude Zidi; Jean Bouchaud
- Produced by: Claude Berri
- Starring: Coluche; Gérard Depardieu
- Cinematography: Henri Decaë
- Edited by: Nicole Saunier
- Music by: Vladimir Cosma
- Production companies: Renn Productions; France 3
- Distributed by: AMLF
- Release date: 3 December 1980 (France)
- Running time: 100 minutes
- Country: France
- Language: French

Inspector Blunder (French: Inspecteur la Bavure) is a 1980 French comedy film directed by Claude Zidi. It stars comedian Coluche as a hapless trainee police detective pitted against public enemy number one (Gérard Depardieu). The film was a box-office hit in France.

The character played by Depardieu is loosely based on real-life gangster Jacques Mesrine, who had been shot dead by police the previous year. 28 years later, Depardieu would go on to play a supporting role in the biopic Mesrine, this time portraying Mesrine's mentor.

== Plot ==
In post-war France, heroic police inspector Jules Clément is fatally wounded by Pierrot le fou. On his deathbed, he tells his young son Michel: "You’ll be a cop, my son!"

Years later, Michel, now an adult, tries to fulfill his father's wish under pressure from his mother. A hopeless student at the Police Academy, he manages to pass the inspector exam thanks to a special jury indulgence. He then becomes a judicial police trainee at the Paris Police Prefecture.

On his first day on the job, Michel gets beaten up by other officers who have mistaken him for an accomplice of public enemy number one, gangster Roger Morzini. Marie-Anne Prossant, an ambitious journalist and the daughter of an influential publisher, photographs the incident and threatens to publish the pictures unless she is allowed to cover the police's activities. She is then assigned to the team formed by Michel and aging officer Watrin. While totally clueless as a police detective, Michel dreams of proving his worth by capturing Morzini.

Morzini, whose face is now too well known by the general public, gets cosmetic surgery, choosing a new face resembling actor Gérard Depardieu. Marie-Anne publicly mocks Morzini, hoping this will bring the gangster out of hiding so she can get an exclusive interview from him. Annoyed by her comments, Morzini decides to get revenge.

After Morzini threatens Marie-Anne over the phone, Michel is given the task of ensuring her safety. However, he has only been given the job as a distraction, while more experienced officers monitor him and Marie-Anne undercover in the hope of capturing Morzini. Michel falls in love with Marie-Anne.

Posing as a crime fiction writer seeking expert advice, Morzini befriends Michel, who naively tells him everything about the police's inner workings and how they plan to capture him.

With Michel's unwitting complicity, Morzini kidnaps Marie-Anne and demands a ransom from her father. Michel is arrested by his own colleagues, who believe him to be in league with Morzini. After hiding a tracking device in Michel's jacket, they allow him to escape from custody, hoping he will lead them to Morzini. Michel accidentally discovers the device, allowing him to elude them.

With the help of some friends, Michel kidnaps Morzini's mother, who reveals the location of her son's hideout. Having found the abandoned mansion where Morzini is holding Marie-Anne hostage, Michel smashes through it with an excavator. He rescues Marie-Anne, leaving Morzini trapped on top of the half-demolished building. Michel and Marie-Anne later cavort in bed together while simultaneously phoning her father to inform him of her rescue.

== Cast ==
- Coluche as Inspector Michel Clément / Jules Clément
- Gérard Depardieu as Roger Morzini
- Dominique Lavanant as Marie-Anne Prossant
- Julien Guiomar as Inspector Vermillot
- Alain Mottet as Dumeze
- François Perrot as Louis Prossant, Marie-Anne's father
- Jean Bouchaud as Inspector Zingo
- Clément Harari as Dr. Haquenbusch, the plastic surgeon
- Philippe Khorsand as Alphonse Rouchard
- Martin Lamotte as Inspector Gaffuri
- Dany Saval as antiquarian
- Hubert Deschamps as Inspector Marcel Watrin
- Marthe Villalonga as Marthe Clément, Michel's mother
- Richard Anconina as Philou
- Féodor Atkine as Merlino
- Richard Bohringer as cop
- Jeanne Herviale as Denise Morzini
- Jean-Paul Lilienfeld as Libenstein
- Gabriel Gobin as lawyer
- Gérard Holtz as himself
- Hippolyte Girardot as friend of Michel Clément
- Michel Pilorgé as snitch

== Production ==
Inspector Blunder was Coluche's first film in three years. Following the failure of his first film as a director, Vous n'aurez pas l'Alsace et la Lorraine, he had preferred to focus on his career as a stand-up comedian. The film was shot in the Paris metropolitan area between 21 July and 29 September 1980.

== Release ==
The film was released in France on 3 December 1980. A comic book adaptation was published at the time, with art by Cabu.

The film's release occurred shortly after Coluche announced his — ultimately withdrawn — candidacy to the 1981 presidential election. The actor then received death threats from a group, ostensibly composed of police officers, that accused him of ridiculing the police with this film. It was later established that those threats emanated from a far-right group attempting to sow confusion in the context of the approaching election.

== Reception ==
Inspector Blunder was a major box-office success in France, where it sold over 3.7 million admissions. The film's success allowed Coluche to reestablish himself as a bankable film star. In the years that followed, he starred in a series of highly successful comedies.

== Home media ==
The film was first released on VHS in 1983 and on DVD in 2003. It was later made available on several streaming services including Amazon Prime, Canal+ and Apple TV.
