= La Smala =

1984 French comedy film by Jean-Loup Hubert

- Directed by: Jean-Loup Hubert
- Written by: Jean-Loup Hubert
- Produced by: Alain Terzian
- Starring: Josiane Balasko; Victor Lanoux; Dominique Lavanant
- Cinematography: Jean Charvein
- Edited by: Hélène Viard
- Music by: Michel Goglat
- Production companies: Films A2; T. Films
- Distributed by: UGC
- Release date: 29 August 1984
- Running time: 90 min.
- Language: French
- Box office: $5.8 million

La Smala (English: The Entourage) is a 1984 French comedy film directed by Jean-Loup Hubert.

== Plot ==
Simone, a former rocker, is a homemaker who works in a city of the suburbs of Lyon. She deals especially with Robert, a former virtuoso accordion languishing in unemployment, and his five children. One day, Robert's wife left him to go to live in Paris with a cop. Desperate, Robert decided to go to the capital to persuade her to come back. Meanwhile, Simone takes a few days of well-deserved vacation, went to Paris to visit her brother. She then finds herself in the same train compartment as Robert, and she discovered stunned on arrival at Lyon that his five children followed him. She must manage all this smala and can happily rely on the hospitality of her brother Pierrot (a transsexual, named now Rita), to take care of all these people. But Simone, who is secretly in love with Robert, will help him in his research and even get the opportunity to record an album with one of his old friends in the music business...

== Cast ==
- Josiane Balasko as Simone
- Victor Lanoux as Robert
- Dominique Lavanant as Pierrot / Rita
- Maurice Risch as Gégène
- Charles Gérard as Yvon
- Cerise Leclerc as Lulubelle
- Fabrice Samson as Jojo
- Cándida Romero as Lucie
- Hassine Aouichi as Billy
- Mahmoud Zemmouri as Omar Ben Youssef
- Xavier Fultot as Jean-Marie
- Monique Estelle as Jaja
- Hakim Ghanem as Babar
- Thierry Lhermitte as The Sick Cop
- Martin Lamotte as The Monk
- Gilberte Géniat as The Concierge
- Luis Rego as The Internal
- Smaïn as The Fighter
- Perrette Souplex as The Old Lady on the Train
- Rémy Bricka as himself
