= Richard Bohringer =

French actor, singer, writer, and film director (born 1942)

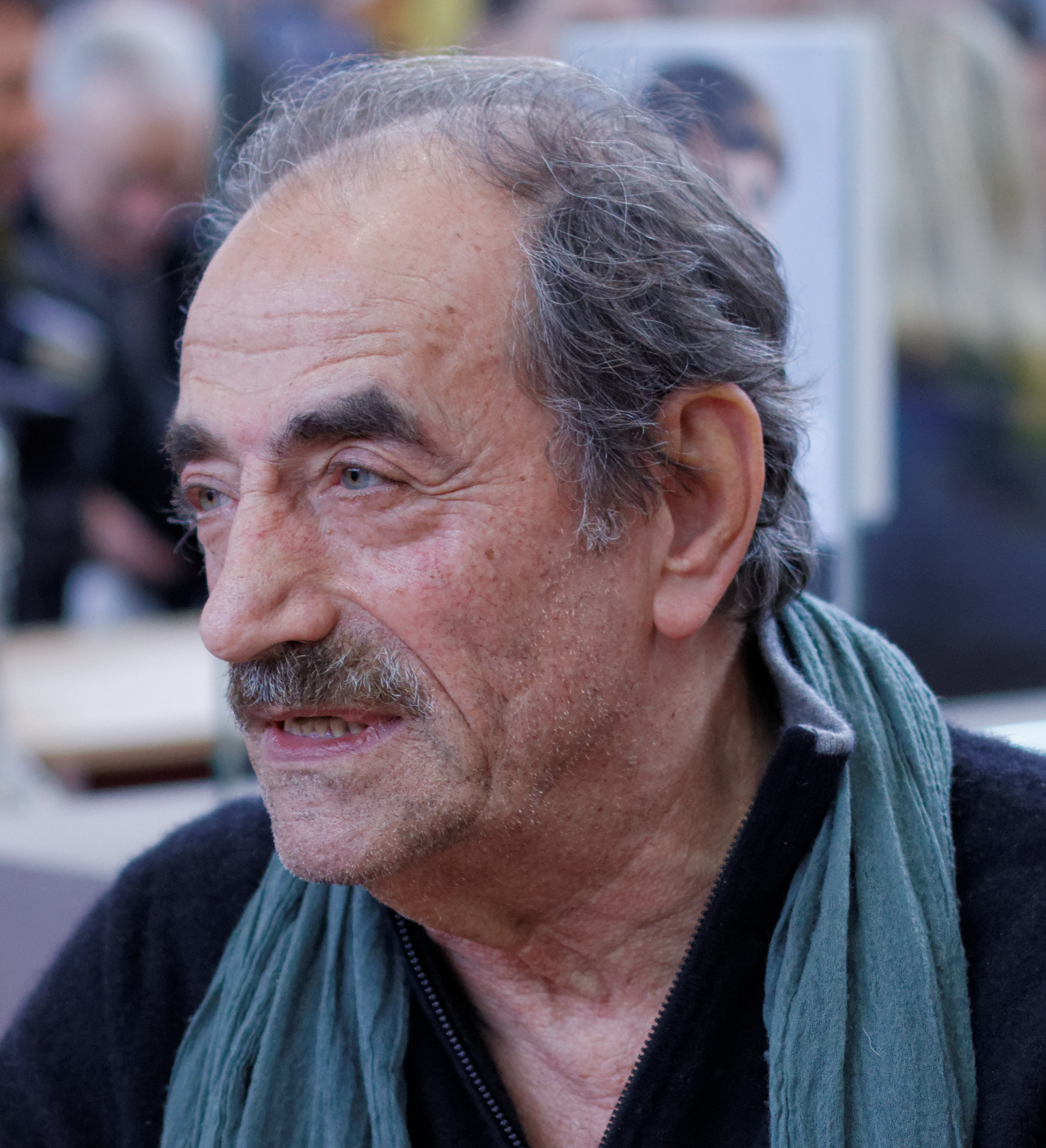
- Richard Bohringer in March 2013
- Born: 16 January 1942 (age 84); Moulins, France
- Citizenship: French, Senegalese
- Occupations: Actor, singer, author, film director, screenwriter
- Years active: Late 1960s–present
- Website: richardbohringer.com

Richard Bohringer (French pronunciation: [ʁiʃaʁ boʁɛ̃ʒe]; born 16 January 1942) is a French actor, singer, writer, and film director. He is the father of actresses Romane Bohringer and Lou Bohringer.

== Early life ==
Bohringer was born in Moulins, Allier, France, to a French mother, Huguette Foucault and a German father. His parents met during World War II, making him a child of war.

At his birth, his parents left him with his maternal grandmother who lived in an HLM in Deuil-la-Barre, his mother leaving to live in Germany. His father, dispatched to the Russian front, was taken prisoner for five years. Despite these difficulties, Bohringer describes his childhood with his grandmother as a happy one. During his life, he was able to see his father only three times.

He made his stage debut near the end of the 1960s. His first play, Les Girafes, was produced by Claude Lelouch. He entered the world of film with his first feature, Gérard Brach's La Maison, in 1970.

== Career ==
In 1972, Richard Bohringer landed a significant role in L'Italien des Roses. It took until the beginning of the 1980s, however, for the actor, already in his forties, to truly make an impact, becoming one of the most notable French actors of this period. Beginning in 1981 with the film Diva by Jean-Jacques Beineix, he followed with numerous other roles, winning two César Awards for L'Addition (1984) and The Grand Highway (1987).

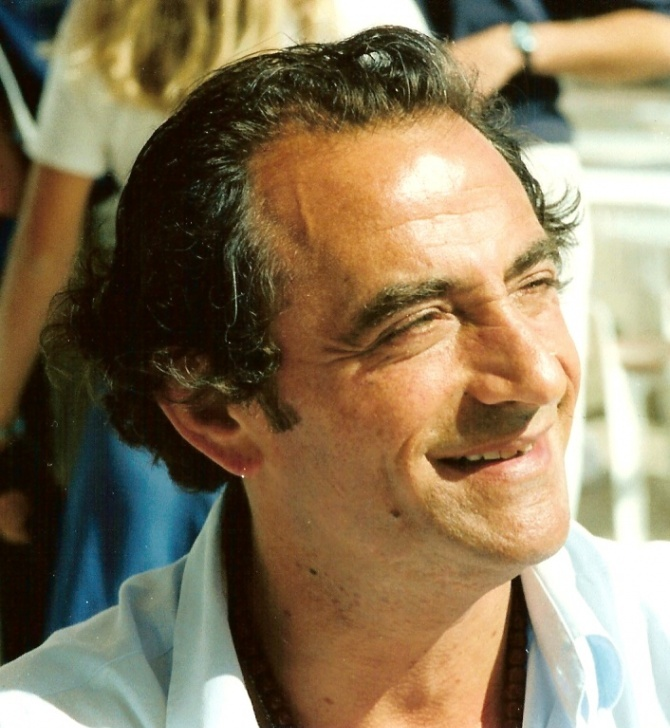
Richard Bohringer at the 1994 Cannes Film Festival

Other notable performances include his work in Luc Besson's Subway (1985), Peter Greenaway's The Cook, the Thief, His Wife and Her Lover (1989), and Gérard Jugnot's Une époque formidable... (1991). He also became a favored actor for Jean-Loup Hubert, playing the flighty husband in J'ai épousé une ombre (1983), and a collaborator with Jean-Pierre Mocky and his friend Bernard Giraudeau. In 1992, Bohringer and his daughter, Romane, were brought together on-screen by Claude Miller for The Accompanist.

In the 1990s, he became the presenter for Mission Appolo, a French-language variety show on Antenne 2, followed by the film Tango (1993), after which he worked more sparingly. Bohringer would then turn again to television with the series Un homme en colère (1997–2002).

Well before Bohringer began writing novels, he also attempted to write poetry set to music, himself a fan of slam poetry. He released a series of such albums between 1980 and 2002.

In 2010, at The European Theatre in Paris, France, he staged a one-man show adapted from his book Traîne pas sous la pluie. This began a tour of more than two years, with Bohringer regaling the public with stories of alcohol, travel, Africa, women, and more. In July 2011, he performed the show during The "Off" Festival of Avignon.

In January 2013, he created the play J'avais un beau ballon rouge, where he shared the stage with his daughter Romane for the first time. The play went on to great success on tour, and in Paris, at the Théâtre du Rond-Point.

A lover of literature, in April 2017, he read from the texts of Jack London and writer and war correspondent Olivier Weber during the opening night of festival of Literature and Journalism in Metz.

In 2018, he guest-starred in the television series À votre service.

In 2023, his daughter Romane put him onstage at the Théâtre de l'Atelier in Quinze rounds, a solo performance derived from his work of the same title.

== Awards and recognition ==
Bohringer won the César Award for Best Supporting Actor in 1985, and the César Award for Best Actor in 1988.

He was the special guest at the 25th edition of the Festival Polar de Cognac in 2020.

== Selected filmography ==
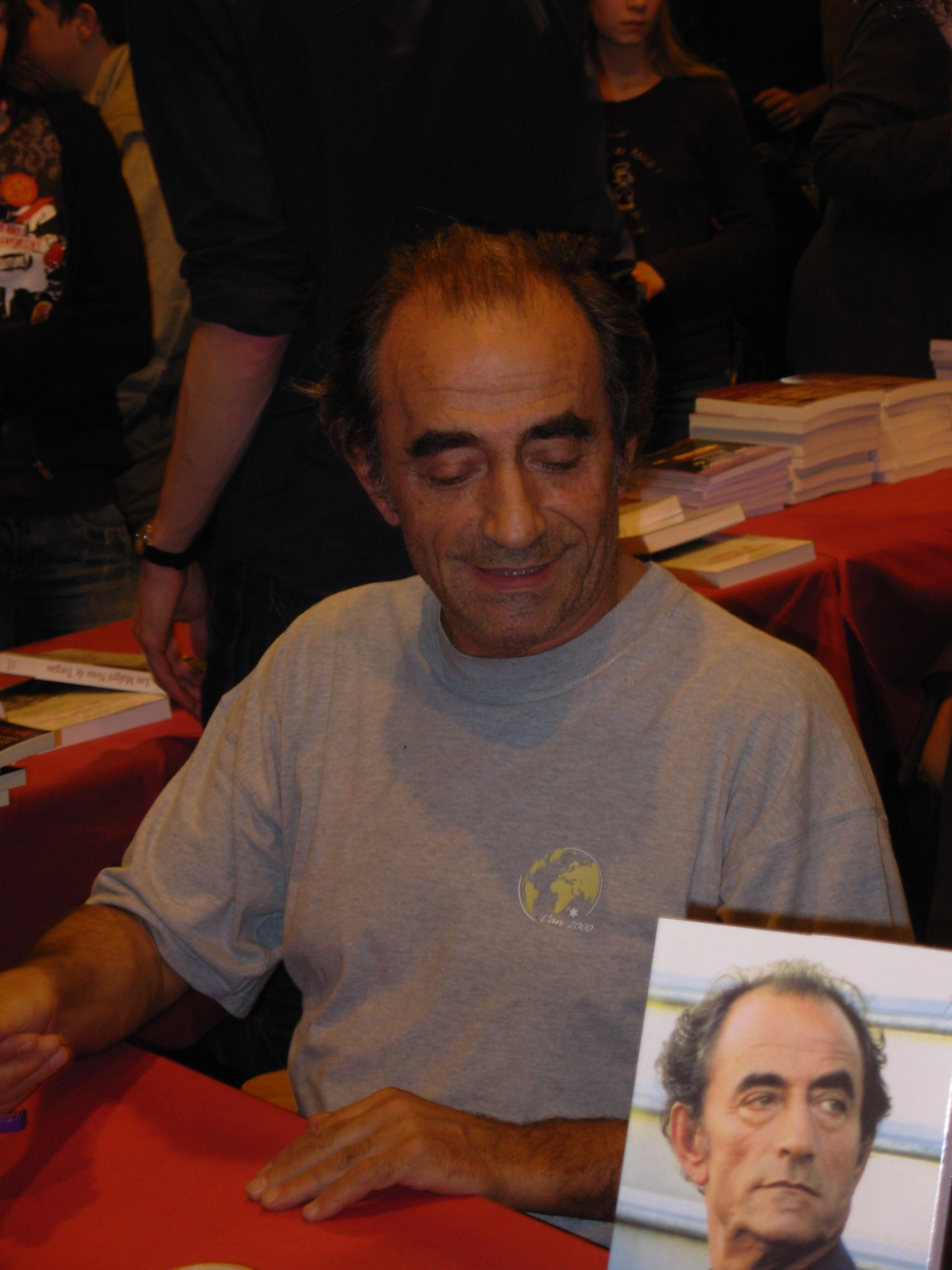
Richard Bohringer in 2006

Year	Title	Role	Director
1977	Animal	An assistant of Sergio	Claude Zidi
1980	The Last Metro	a Gestapo officer	François Truffaut
1980	Inspector Blunder	fingerprint analyst	Claude Zidi
1980	La Boum	a friend of François	Claude Pinoteau
1981	Diva	Gorodish	Jean-Jacques Beineix
1981	Les Uns et les Autres	Richard	Claude Lelouch
1982	Le Grand Pardon	Le Sacristain	Alexandre Arcady
1984	L'Addition	Albert Lorca	Denis Amar
1985	Death in a French Garden	Daniel Forest	Michel Deville
1985	Subway	the florist	Luc Besson
1986	Kamikaze	Romain Pascot	Didier Grousset
1987	The Grand Highway	Pelo	Jean-Loup Hubert
1987	Agent trouble	Alex	Jean-Pierre Mocky
1987	Flag	Inspecteur Simon	Jacques Santi
1988	Door on the Left as You Leave the Elevator	Boris	Édouard Molinaro
1989	The Cook, the Thief, His Wife & Her Lover	Richard Boarst	Peter Greenaway
1990	Dames galantes	Brantôme	Jean-Charles Tacchella
1992	Confessions d'un Barjo	Charles	Jérôme Boivin
1992	The Accompanist	Charles Brice	Claude Miller
1993	Tango	Vincent Baraduc	Patrice Leconte
1994	The Heart's Cry	Paulo	Idrissa Ouedraogo
1996	Unpredictable Nature of the River	Commander de Blanet	Bernard Giraudeau
1997	La Vérité si je mens !	Victor Benzakhem	Thomas Gilou
1997	Wild Animals	the boss	Kim Ki-duk
1999	Méditerranées	Ramirez	Philippe Bérenger
2001	The Cat's Meow	the film director	Peter Bogdanovich
2003	Crime Spree	Laurent Bastaldi	Brad Mirman
2003	The Overeater	Émile Lachaume	Thierry Binisti
2006	A City Is Beautiful at Night	Richard	Richard Bohringer
2008	Admiral	General Janin	Andreï Kravtchouk
2015	By the Sea	Patrice	Angelina Jolie Pitt
