= Mixed Nuts =

- Theatrical release poster
- Directed by: Nora Ephron
- Written by: Nora Ephron; Delia Ephron
- Based on: Le Père Noël est une ordure (Santa Claus is a Stinker) by Jean-Marie Poiré
- Produced by: Joseph Hartwick; Paul Junger Witt; Tony Thomas
- Starring: Steve Martin; Madeline Kahn; Robert Klein; Anthony LaPaglia; Juliette Lewis; Rob Reiner; Adam Sandler; Rita Wilson
- Cinematography: Sven Nykvist
- Edited by: Robert M. Reitano
- Music by: George Fenton
- Production company: TriStar Pictures
- Distributed by: Sony Pictures Releasing
- Release date: December 21, 1994
- Running time: 97 minutes
- Country: United States
- Language: English
- Budget: $20 million
- Box office: $6.8 million

Mixed Nuts is a 1994 American Christmas black comedy film directed by Nora Ephron, based on the 1982 French comedy film Le Père Noël est une ordure (Santa Claus is a Stinker). Co-written by Ephron and her sister Delia, the film features an ensemble cast which includes Steve Martin, Madeline Kahn, Rita Wilson, Anthony LaPaglia, Garry Shandling, Rob Reiner, Juliette Lewis, Adam Sandler, and Liev Schreiber in his film debut.

The film was released theatrically by Sony Pictures Releasing on December 21, 1994, and was both a critical and commercial failure.

== Plot ==
In Venice, Los Angeles on Christmas Eve, an ex-con named Felix is being chased down the road by his angry, pregnant girlfriend, Gracie. He accidentally runs into and damages a Christmas tree carried by two rollerbladers. An argument breaks out among them. A stranger named Philip tries to calm them down. They disperse, and Philip picks up the damaged tree and takes it to his office.

Philip runs a suicide-prevention hotline called "Lifesavers,” working there with a judgmental widow named Mrs. Munchnik and an overly sensitive woman named Catherine. Catherine obviously has a crush on Philip, but he seems oblivious. Philip receives an eviction notice from the landlord, Stanley, who is planning to convert the building to condominiums. Philip keeps the eviction notice a secret from his coworkers, and tries to get his loan officer fiancée, Susan, to grant him a small loan to stay in business. Susan refuses to grant the loan and breaks up with Philip, saying she has been cheating on him with a psychiatrist.

The hotline is not too busy on Christmas eve, but they do get a call from a woman who is afraid of the "Seaside Strangler" (a serial killer who has recently targeted women in the neighborhood), and a call from Chris, a depressed transgender woman who wants to visit the office in person so as to get away from her judgmental family. Mrs. Munchnik's shift ends, but she gets trapped in the elevator as she leaves. She eventually manages to get Philip's attention and he manages to pull her out.

Gracie arrives at the office to see her friend Catherine; Felix, chasing Gracie, also shows up. Gracie hits Felix in the head with a fruitcake, giving him a concussion. Philip and Catherine take Felix to a veterinarian friend to get treated for free. At the vet, Felix accidentally overdoses on dog tranquilizers. He is taken to a hospital.

Chris arrives at the office; Gracie opens the door for her so quickly that she accidentally strikes Mrs. Munchnik and knocks her unconscious. Gracie asks Chris to look after Mrs. Munchnik, then leaves. Philip returns to the office; Chris strikes up a conversation with him and convinces him to dance. Mrs. Munchnik awakens, witnesses their dancing, and threatens to sue Philip for withholding information of the eviction and for inappropriate office behavior. She leaves.

Gracie gives Catherine a makeover; then they return to the office with Chinese food. Downstairs neighbor Louie, who has a crush on Catherine, joins them. Meanwhile, Philip throws the fruitcake out of the office window and accidentally smashes the windshield of Mrs. Munchnik's car, just as she is about to drive away. Fellow neighbor Mr. Lobel approaches her with his three dogs and tries to cheer her up. Mrs. Munchnik suddenly kisses him; they run off to the beach and have sex.

An hour later, Felix (having regained consciousness and escaped from the hospital) arrives at the office brandishing a gun. Chris attempts to disarm him and gets shot in the foot. Gracie takes the gun and shoots wildly around the office to empty it of ammunition. Two shots go through the front door—and kill the landlord, Stanley, who had just showed up to try to fix the elevator. The sight of the dead man puts Catherine in shock. Philip prepares a bath to calm her down and realizes that he is attracted to her. Catherine and Philip have sex in the bathroom. Meanwhile, Louie and Chris start flirting with each other; Louie makes up a song for Chris on his ukulele.

Gracie and Felix disguise Stanley's body as a Christmas tree: they wrap it in burlap and attach the branches of the office Christmas tree with Super Glue. Everyone leaves the office to help carry the "tree" and leave it on the boardwalk, along with the bag that Stanley was carrying. Outside, they encounter the angry rollerbladers from the first scene, who recognize Felix and decide to destroy his "tree" in revenge. The "tree" crashes to the ground and reveals the dead body. The police arrive and ask for an explanation. Philip says that the gun is Felix's, but then Gracie confesses to the crime instead. Not wanting Gracie to go to jail, Felix grabs the gun, runs to the roof of a building, and threatens to commit suicide.

Philip must be a real "life saver" and convince Felix not to kill himself. He makes an emotional speech about Christmas, which convinces Felix to climb down and face the consequences. Meanwhile, the detectives have been investigating Stanley's bag. They find fishing line and kelp, the Seaside Strangler's weapons of choice, revealing Stanley to be the serial killer.

For killing the criminal, Gracie receives a $250,000 reward. She gives Philip some of the money to pay their debts, then promptly goes into labor. Giving birth at midnight on Christmas Day, the scene parodies the Nativity of Jesus. Philip then proposes to Catherine, and she accepts.

In the end credits, Felix finally fulfills his dream of becoming a mural artist, painting a mural depicting everything that happened on this eventful Christmas Eve.

== Cast ==
- Steve Martin as Philip
- Madeline Kahn as Mrs. Blanche Munchnik
- Robert Klein as Mr. Lobel
- Anthony LaPaglia as Felix
- Juliette Lewis as Gracie
- Rob Reiner as Dr. Kinsky
- Adam Sandler as Louie Capshaw
- Liev Schreiber as Chris
- Garry Shandling as Stanley
- Rita Wilson as Catherine O'Shaughnessy
- Parker Posey and Jon Stewart as Rollerbladers
- Joely Fisher as Susan
- Christine Cavanaugh and Henry Brown as Police officers
- Brian Markinson as Policeman / Voice of obscene caller
- Steven Wright as Man at pay phone
- Caroline Aaron and Mary Gross as Hotline callers
- Victor Garber as Voice of irate neighbor
- Haley Joel Osment as Little boy
- Michael Badalucco as AAA driver
- Sidney Armus and Diane Sokolow as Chris's parents
- Kurt Lockwood as Rollerblading Snowman (uncredited)

== Production ==
The film was initially titled The Night Before Christmas when it was in development at Walt Disney Pictures, but the film went into turnaround and ended up at TriStar Pictures. While the film is set in Los Angeles, due to an impending International Alliance of Theatrical Stage Employees strike the filmmakers setup interior filming locations in New York City. A snowstorm impacted the travel of the cast and crew who became reliant on the New York City Subway to get to the set.

== Soundtrack ==
Mixed Nuts

Soundtrack album by various artists
- Released: November 22, 1994
- Genre: Christmas
- Length: 37:56
- Label: Sony Music
- Producer: George Fenton

1. "Mixed Nuts" by Dr. John – 2:29
2. "I'll Be Home for Christmas" by Fats Domino – 4:08
3. "Santa Baby" by Eartha Kitt – 3:26
4. "Jingle Bells" by Eastern Bloc – 2:25
5. "Blue Christmas" by Leon Redbone – 2:24
6. "What Are You Doing New Year's Eve?" by The O'Jays – 5:14
7. "Mixed Notes" by George Fenton – 3:48
8. "Grape Jelly" by Adam Sandler – 1:25
9. "Christmas Melody" by George Fenton – 2:54
10. "The Night Before Christmas" by Carly Simon – 3:39
11. "Silent Night" by Baby Washington – 3:23
12. "White Christmas" by The Drifters – 2:41

== Release ==
The film opened on December 21, 1994, and made $2,307,850 in its first weekend, ranking number 12 in the domestic box office. By the end of its run, it had grossed a mere $6,821,850.

=== Critical reception ===
On review aggregator Rotten Tomatoes, Mixed Nuts holds an approval rating of 16% based on 32 reviews, with an average rating of 3.2/10. The website's critical consensus reads: "Mixed Nuts may provoke strong allergic reactions in all but the most undemanding filmgoers - and the most forgiving Steve Martin fans.” On Metacritic, the film had a weighted average score of 14 out of 100 based on 16 critics, indicating "overwhelming dislike.” Audiences surveyed by CinemaScore gave the film a grade "C+" on scale of A to F.

Janet Maslin's review in The New York Times mentioned a corpse depicted in the story and wrote that the film "is about as funny as that corpse and about as natural" Variety staff wrote that "director/co-scripter Nora Ephron pitches the humor at a cacophonous level and displays the comedic equivalent of two left feet in evolving an absurdist, slapstick yarn. Truly alarming is watching some fine performers, including Kahn and LaPaglia, at their very worst.” Roger Ebert of the Chicago Sun-Times wrote: "The movie has a first-rate cast and crew; it's Nora Ephron's first directing job since the wonderful Sleepless in Seattle [...] Maybe there's too much talent. Every character shines with such dazzling intensity and such inexhaustible comic invention that the movie becomes tiresome, like too many clowns.” Michael Dwyer in the Irish Times, reviewing it upon its European release, called Ephron's film "a truly pathetic effort.” and "one of the worst films I have ever seen.”

=== Year-end lists ===
- #1 Worst - Jeffrey Lyons, Sneak Previews
- #7 Worst - Michael Medved, Sneak Previews
- 5th worst – Desson Howe, The Washington Post
- 10th worst – Robert Denerstein, Rocky Mountain News
- Dishonorable mention – William Arnold, Seattle Post-Intelligencer
- Dishonorable mention – Dan Craft, The Pantagraph

== See also ==
- List of Christmas films
