= Lautrec (film) =

1998 French biographical film

- Directed by: Roger Planchon
- Written by: Roger Planchon
- Produced by: Margaret Ménégoz
- Starring: Régis Royer; Elsa Zylberstein
- Cinematography: Gérard Simon
- Edited by: Isabelle Devinck
- Music by: Jean-Pierre Fouquey
- Distributed by: Les Films du Losange
- Release date: 7 September 1998 (VFF)
- Running time: 125 minutes
- Country: France
- Language: French

Lautrec is a 1998 French biographical film about the painter Henri de Toulouse-Lautrec. The film focuses on his love affair with painter Suzanne Valadon.

== Cast ==
- Régis Royer - Henri de Toulouse-Lautrec
- Elsa Zylberstein - Suzanne Valadon
- Anémone - Comtesse Adèle de Toulouse-Lautrec
- Claude Rich - Comte Alphonse de Toulouse-Lautrec
- Hélène Babu - La Goulue
- Claire Borotra - Hélène
- Alex Pandev - La Grande Charlotte
- Amanda Rubinstein - Mireille
- Florence Viala - Rose la Rouge
- Jean-Marie Bigard - Aristide Bruant
- Karel Vingerhoets - Vincent van Gogh
