= Madman at War =

1985 film

- Film poster
- Directed by: Dino Risi
- Written by: Agenore Incrocci; Furio Scarpelli; Claude Berri; Anne Dutter; Simon Mizrahi
- Produced by: Pio Angeletti; Adriano de Micheli; Claude Berri
- Starring: Coluche
- Cinematography: Giorgio Di Battista
- Edited by: Alberto Gallitti
- Music by: Guido & Maurizio De Angelis
- Distributed by: AMLF
- Release date: 22 May 1985
- Running time: 108 minutes
- Countries: France; Italy
- Languages: French; Italian

Madman at War (Italian: Scemo di guerra, French: Le fou de guerre) is a 1985 Italian-French dark comedy film directed by Dino Risi. It was entered into the 1985 Cannes Film Festival.

== Plot ==
At the beginning of World War II, Marcello Lupi, a young Italian Army psychiatrist, is sent to a Field Hospital Unit in Libya. He soon notices the odd behavior of the camp's surgeon, commander Oscar Pilli.

The unit's commander, the aged major Bellucci, soon manages to be transferred back to Italy, leaving Pilli in charge of the camp. Lupi realizes that Pilli is not merely eccentric, but mentally deranged, and tries to protect his subordinates from harm.

== Cast ==
- Coluche as Oscar Pilli
- Beppe Grillo as Marcello Lupi
- Bernard Blier as Bellucci
- Fabio Testi as Boda
- Claudio Bisio as Pintus
- Gianni Franco as Cerioni
- Franco Diogene (credited as Francesco Diogene) as Nitti
- Sandro Ghiani as Puddu
- Guido Nicheli as Rossi
- Tiziana Altieri as Fatma
- Geoffrey Copleston as the German commander
