= Tango (1993 film) =

- Film poster
- Directed by: Patrice Leconte
- Written by: Patrice Leconte; Patrick Dewolf
- Starring: Philippe Noiret; Richard Bohringer
- Cinematography: Eduardo Serra
- Music by: Angélique Nachon; Jean-Claude Nachon
- Distributed by: AMLF
- Release date: 3 June 1993
- Running time: 88 minutes
- Country: France
- Language: French
- Budget: $8.8 million
- Box office: $4.8 million

Tango is a 1993 French comedy film directed by Patrice Leconte.

== Cast ==
- Philippe Noiret - L'Elégant
- Richard Bohringer - Vincent Baraduc
- Thierry Lhermitte - Paul
- Carole Bouquet - Female Guest
- Jean Rochefort - Bellhop
- Miou-Miou - Marie
- Judith Godrèche - Madeleine
- Michèle Laroque - Hélène Baraduc
- Maxime Leroux - Mariano Escobar
- Jean Benguigui - Lefort
- Ticky Holgado - Waiter
- Laurent Gamelon - Taxi Driver
- Jacques Mathou - Truck Driver
- Élodie Bouchez - Girl in Aeroplane
