= Death in a French Garden =

1985 film

- Theatrical release poster
- Directed by: Michel Deville
- Written by: Michel Deville; René Belletto; Rosalinde Deville
- Produced by: Emmanuel Schlumberger
- Starring: Anémone
- Cinematography: Martial Thury
- Edited by: Raymonde Guyot
- Music by: Johannes Brahms; Enrique Granados; Franz Schubert
- Distributed by: Gaumont Distribution
- Release date: 13 February 1985
- Running time: 100 minutes
- Country: France
- Language: French

Death in a French Garden (French: Péril en la demeure) is a 1985 French drama film directed by Michel Deville. It was entered into the 35th Berlin International Film Festival.

== Plot ==
David Aurphet, a struggling guitar teacher, is invited to give lessons to Viviane Tombsthay, the daughter of a well-to-do couple. The wife, Julia, commences an affair with him while Viviane and a neighbour, Edwige, proposition him. Later, David is robbed but is rescued by a stranger, Daniel Forest, whom he has seen hanging around near the Tombsthays' property. Daniel admits to being a contract killer who is on a job and suggests that the robbery is a cover for someone who wishes to injure David's hand, such as a jealous husband.

David receives an anonymous video tape with evidence of his affair; Julia says she has received one, too. He tells Edwige about the video but not about Julia. After he finds that someone has been at his house, he asks Daniel to stay overnight just in case. Julia appears and invites David to her home as her husband is away. After she leaves, Daniel tells David that Julia's husband, Graham, is his intended target. He warns David to be wary of Graham and suggest he avoids Julia for a while. When David refuses, Daniel gives him a hand gun for protection.

David arrives but finds Graham there wanting to kill him. David shoots him. Julia advises David to leave and he seeks refuge with Edwige. She shows him a video that shows that he only injured Graham, who was later killed by Julia.

David is later threatened by Daniel over some missing microfilm. David kills him and leaves the area with Viviane.

== Cast ==
- Anémone as Edwige Ledieu
- Richard Bohringer as Daniel Forest
- Nicole Garcia as Julia Tombsthay
- Christophe Malavoy as David Aurphet
- Michel Piccoli as Graham Tombsthay
- Anaïs Jeanneret as Vivianne Tombsthay
- Jean-Claude Jay as Father
- Hélène Roussel as Mother
- Franck de la Personne as Guitar dealer
- Élisabeth Vitali as Waitress
- Daniel Vérité as Attacker
