= Coluche =

French stage comedian and film actor (1944–1986)

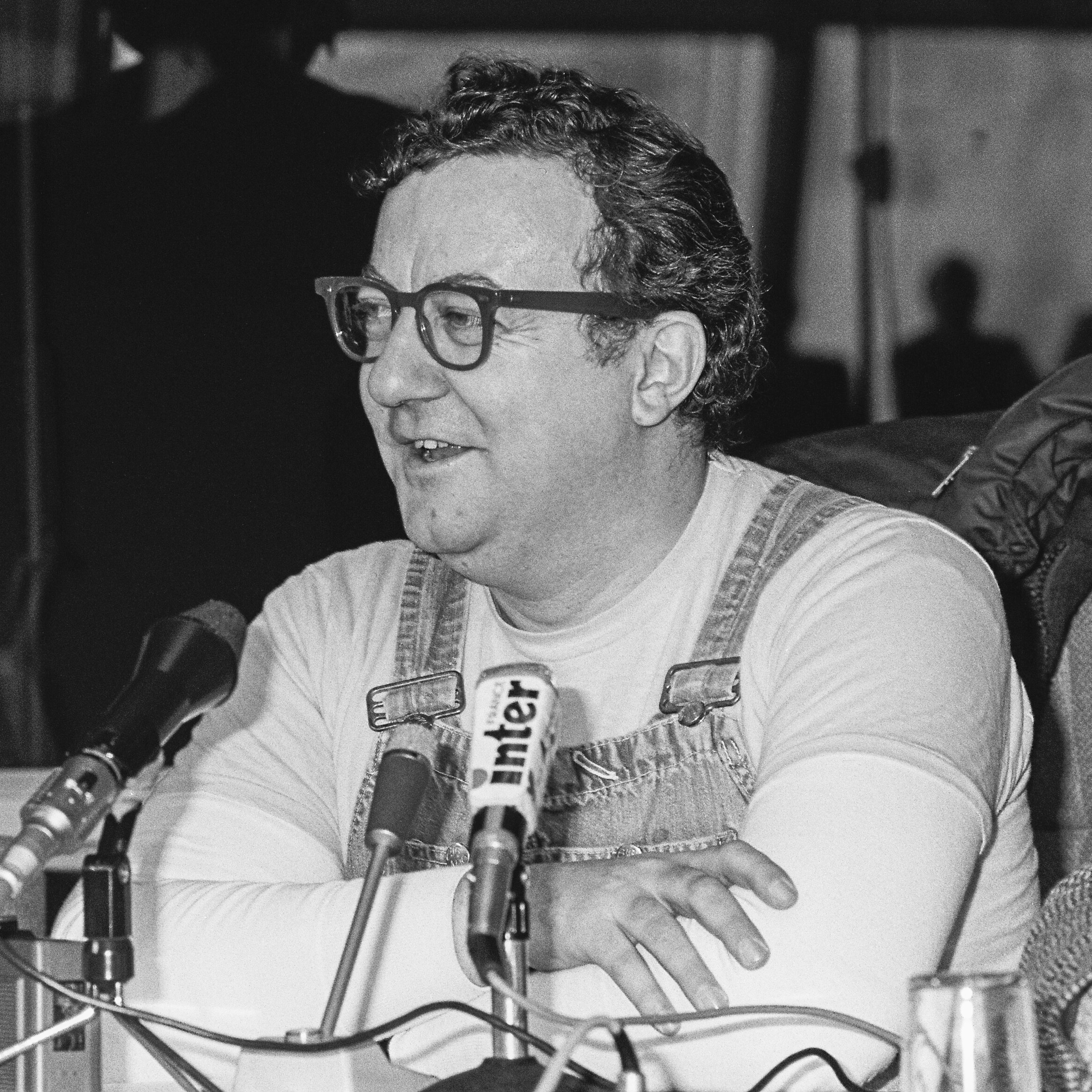
- Coluche in 1986
- Born: Michel Gérard Joseph Colucci; 28 October 1944; Paris, France
- Died: 19 June 1986 (aged 41); Opio, Alpes-Maritimes, France
- Cause of death: Motorcycle crash
- Occupations: Actor, Comedian

Michel Gérard Joseph Colucci (French: [miʃɛl ʒeʁaʁ ʒozɛf kɔlytʃi], Italian: [koˈluttʃi]; 28 October 1944 – 19 June 1986), better known under his stage name Coluche (IPA: [kɔlyʃ]), was a French stand-up comedian, film actor, activist and philanthropist. He adopted Coluche as a stage name at age 26, as he began his entertainment career. He became known for his irreverent attitude towards politics and the establishment, and he incorporated this into much of his material.

Coluche was one of the first major comedians to regularly use profanities as a source of humor on French television. Having become a bankable star of comedy films, he also proved himself a capable dramatic performer by winning the César Award for Best Actor for his performance in So Long, Stooge (1983).

Coluche also founded in 1985 the charity "Les Restaurants du Cœur" which still provides free meals and other products to people in need.

== Early life ==
Colucci was born on 28 October 1944 in a hospital in the 14th arrondissement of Paris. His mother, Simone Bouyer (called "Monette"), worked as a florist in the Boulevard du Montparnasse. His father, Honorio Colucci, an Italian immigrant from Casalvieri, Lazio, was a painter and decorator. His father died in 1947 at age 31 from poliomyelitis; his wife struggled thereafter to raise the young Michel and his sister (Danièle, 18 months older than Michel) on a meagre salary.

Coluche showed little promise at school, and left after completing his primary studies (June 1958). He tried various temporary jobs, and had several run-ins with authorities. During this time his mother bought him a guitar, which he taught himself to play. In 1964 he joined the 60th Infantry Regiment in Lons-le-Saunier, but was imprisoned for insubordination. On his return to civilian life, he worked in his mother's florist shop which she had been able to open on rue d'Aligre, and later in a larger shop which she opened near la Gare de Lyon. He found this work dull and abruptly quit, which caused a long-lasting breach with his mother.

At the end of the 1960s he tried his luck as a singer in cafes, then turned to comedy.

== Career ==
In 1969, Coluche took part with Romain Bouteille to the founding of the Café de la Gare, a Parisian café-théâtre that would become the meeting place of a group of young comedic actors practically all of whom were to become famous: Patrick Dewaere, Henri Guybet, Miou-Miou, Martin Lamotte, etc. Among the patrons of the Café de la Gare were Georges Moustaki, Raymond Devos, Jean Ferrat, Jacques Brel, Leny Escudero, Pierre Perret and Jean Yanne. Other actors who performed the Café de la Gare early in their careers include Gérard Lanvin, Renaud, Rufus, Diane Kurys, Coline Serreau, Anémone, Gérard Depardieu, Thierry Lhermitte, Josiane Balasko and Gérard Jugnot.

Coluche's first sketch C'est l'histoire d'un mec (It's the story of a guy) was about the difficulties of telling a funny story. He quickly found success but his alcohol issues led to scuffles with Dewaere and Bouteille and eventually forced him to leave the Café de la Gare, though he later returned to perform there.

He went on to found another troupe, Le vrai chic parisien (The true Parisian chic), a self-styled "Vulgar Theatre". However, Coluche's behavior caused again the working atmosphere to deteriorate and he eventually left the troupe, as he was looking forward to a solo career. Talent agent Paul Lederman, who had met Coluche in 1974 while he was performing at the Café de la Gare, endeavored to advance his career and introduce him to a more mainstream audience.

It was at this point that Coluche began to dress in his well-known outfit of white tennis shoes, blue striped overalls, a bright yellow T-shirt and round glasses. One of his first widely successful routines was a parody of a TV game (Le Schmilblick). In the course of the 1970s, Coluche established himself as a very popular stand-up comedian. In 1976, he co-starred with Louis de Funès in the comedy film The Wing or the Thigh, which enjoyed great commercial success. The next year, he made his first film as a director, the historical comedy Vous n'aurez pas l'Alsace et la Lorraine, in which he also starred. However, the film failed at the box-office upon release. Coluche was disappointed in his work as a director and did not renew the experience. He then concentrated on his work as a comedian, cementing his popularity in France.

While a famous entertainer, Coluche also remained controversial in France throughout his career due to his use of profanities. In 1979, following audience protests, he was sacked for vulgarity from the radio station Europe 1 where he had been hired as a conductor. The following year, he was hired at Radio Monte Carlo but was sacked ten days later for making a joke about Princess Caroline's sex life. In 1981, he became a conductor on RFM, then a "pirate" radio. Coluche was also associated with the satirical magazines Hara-Kiri and Charlie Hebdo. In the latter publication, he had his own column, Les pauvres sont des cons (The poor are idiots) consisting of humorous photo comics about news topics.

Coluche returned to film in 1980, starring in the comedy Inspecteur la Bavure (Inspector Blunder) directed by Claude Zidi, which enjoyed great commercial success and reestablished him as a bankable film star. His next box-office hits were the comedy Le Maître d'école (1981), the historical parody Deux heures moins le quart avant Jésus-Christ (Quarter To Two B.C., 1982) and the comedy Banzaï (1983). Also in 1983, he starred in the film So Long, Stooge (Tchao Pantin) directed by Claude Berri, where he played his first dramatic role. His performance in that film, which mirrored his chaotic personal life, earned him the César Award for Best Actor in 1984.

Not taking his Award very seriously, Coluche did not capitalize on his newfound credibility as a dramatic actor. He next starred in comedies which he saw as purely commercial affairs, including Good King Dagobert (1984), directed by Dino Risi, which was a box-office failure.

Claude Berri considered casting him in a new dramatic role, that of Ugolin in Jean de Florette and Manon of the Spring, but Coluche's screen tests proved unconvincing; Coluche later said that he didn't feel the character. Being uncomfortable with the idea of doing a fake Southern accent, he requested an excessive salary for the film in order to ensure that Berri would not hire him. Coluche's final film role, Madman at War (1985), an Italian-French dark comedy also directed by Dino Risi, allowed him to show again greater depth in a semi-dramatic role.

From October 1985 to February 1986, Coluche conducted on Canal+ the daily show Coluche 1 faux, which included jokes and parodies of TV news. Also in 1985, he returned on Europe 1 where he became the conductor of a daily show, Y'en aura pour tout le monde ('There's something in it for everyone").

== Comedic style ==
Coluche's comedy skits mixed jokes, social and political satire, observational comedy, ribaldry, dark humor and occasionnally toilet humor. His material, which specialized in ridiculing authorities and institutions, was regarded as subversive.

In his skits, Coluche often portrayed stupid, prejudiced people, in order to mock their narrow-minded views. His routines used working-class language and tropes and regularly included profanities, though he insisted that he was "always rude, never vulgar". He helped popularize in France the type of gross out, anarchic brand of humor associated with the magazines Hara-Kiri and Charlie Hebdo, to which he collaborated.

== Presidential bid ==
In a 30 October 1980 press conference at the theatre of his one-man show, Coluche announced his candidacy to the upcoming presidential election. He was treated as a joke candidate until the Sunday newspaper Le Journal du Dimanche published a poll on 14 December 1980 showing Coluche supported by 16% of potential voters. His "campaign" was supported and organized by Charlie Hebdo, with slogans such as "Before me, France was divided in two; now it will be folded in four" (more idiomatically "être plié en quatre" could be translated as "doubled over laughing"), and "Coluche - the only candidate who has no reason to lie". However, he withdrew following pressure from serious politicians - including François Mitterrand who saw him as a menace for his own candidacy - death threats, and the murder of his stage manager René Gorlin (though that murder later proved to be unconnected with Coluche's candidacy).

== Restaurants du Cœur ==
In September 1985, Coluche used his show on Europe 1 to launch an initiative to collect food for people in need. His idea developed into the "Restaurants du Cœur" (usually called Restos du cœur) charity. The charity (40,000 volunteers in almost 2,500 eating establishments, which serve some 600,000 daily beneficiaries) collects food, money and clothes for the needy and the homeless. Each year, a fundraising concert series is presented by singers and celebrities collectively known as "Les Enfoirés" (named after a profanity frequently used by Coluche).

== Personal life ==
At the beginning of his career, Coluche dated Miou-Miou for a time. It was he who found her stage name, which he had invented as a nickname for her. In 1969, he met Véronique Kantor, who became his girlfriend and whom he married in 1975. They had two sons, Romain (b. 1972) and Marius (b. 1976). The couple divorced in 1981. Following his separation with Véronique, Coluche, who already had problems with alcohol, developed a drug addiction.

In 1982, Coluche began a relationship with Elsa Chalier, who left his friend Patrick Dewaere for him. Dewaere then committed suicide, using a shotgun that Coluche had offered him. The remorse over Dewaere's death caused Coluche to suffer from depression. He later used the pain and sorrow he was experiencing as a basis for his performance in So Long, Stooge.

Coluche's girlfriend during the early eighties was Frédérique "Fred" Romano, a sex shop manager. Both struggled with drug addiction during their relationship. The lead female role of So Long, Stooge, played by Agnès Soral, was partially based on her. In 1985, Coluche endeavored to get his life back on track. At the time of his death, he was in a relationship with Frédérique Fayles-Bernstein, who later married television executive Pierre Lescure.

A motorsports enthusiast, Coluche was a skilled practitioner of motorcycle racing. In March 1985, he set a world speed record (252.087 km/h; 156.64 mph) on a one-km (1000 yard) track in Italy with a 750cc motorcycle.

== Death ==
At 16:35 on 19 June 1986, Coluche died after crashing his Honda 1100 VFC into a truck on the "route de Cannes", a road in the commune of Opio, Alpes-Maritimes in southeastern France. He was 41. This event provoked national grief and inspired the album Putain de camion ("fucking truck") by his close friend Renaud. Some conspiracy theories have since surfaced, mainly in the book Coluche, l'accident: contre-enquête, alleging that Coluche might have been murdered.

== Awards ==
- 1984 César Awards : César Award for Best Actor for So Long, Stooge (Tchao Pantin, 1983)

== Legacy ==
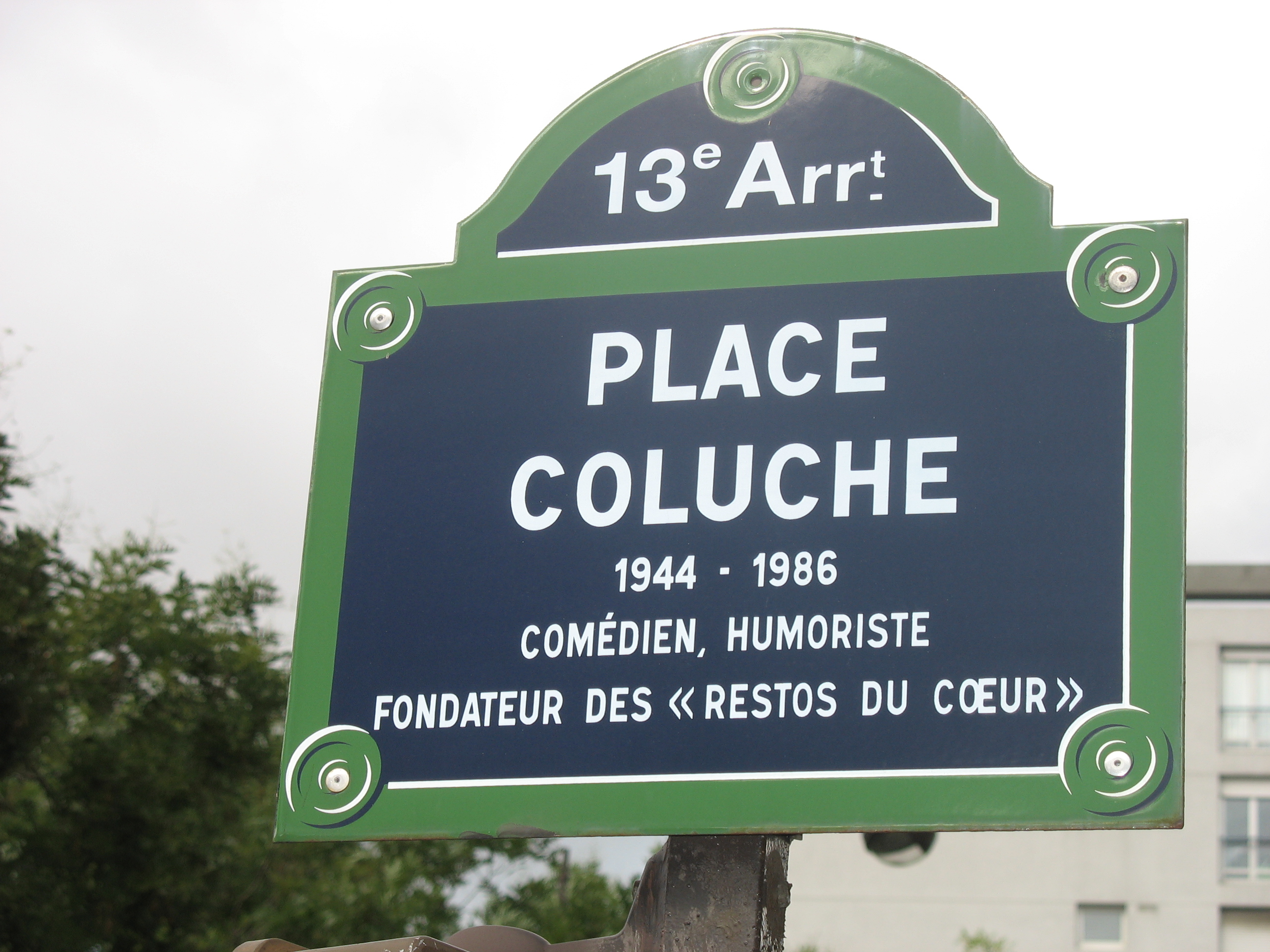
"Place Coluche" in Paris

Coming from a working-class family and a background of grinding poverty, Coluche fought for equality between citizens. A law known as the Loi Coluche (Coluche law) was passed in 1988, allowing large tax deductions (up to 75% in some cases) for individuals or businesses that donate to specified aid agencies.

The Restaurants du Cœur remain a particularly active charity in France. Coluche's ex-wife Véronique, who had remained close to him following their divorce, became the charity's manager after his death and remained involved with it until her own death in 2018.

The main-belt asteroid 170906 Coluche, discovered by Swiss astronomer Michel Ory in 2004, was named after Coluche.

In 2008, Antoine de Caunes directed the biographical film Coluche : l'histoire d'un mec, relating the events surrounding Coluche's bid for the French presidency in 1981 and starring François-Xavier Demaison as Coluche.

In March 2011, a bronze statue of Coluche, dressed in his trademark striped dungarees, was unveiled in his hometown of Montrouge (suburb of Paris). There is another statue of him in Le Vigan, Gard in the south of France. Numerous theatres, schools and social spaces bear his name all over France. A Place Coluche (Coluche Square) was inaugurated in 2006 in Paris' 14th arrondissement, close to his former home.

On the occasion of the 30th anniversary of his death, an exhibition about Coluche was held at Paris City Hall from 6 October 2016 to 14 January 2017. It focused on his radio and movie career up to his announcement of his presidential candidacy.

A poor manager of his own finances, Coluche left 6,1 million francs in debt at the time of his death. His ex-wife Véronique refused the succession and sold the rights to his most famous comedy sketches, which she had obtained upon divorce, to Coluche's former agent Paul Lederman for 1,5 million. As Coluche's sons Romain and Marius reached adulthood, they accused Lederman of misappropriating the rights to their father's work and of falsifying documents. In 1991, they sued him over the rights, engaging in a protracted legal battle. Romain and Marius Colucci eventually prevailed in court in 2019, following 28 years of dispute.

== Filmography ==
Year	Title	Role	Director	Notes
1970	Le Pistonné	Marquand	Claude Berri	
1970	Donkey Skin	Insulting peasant	Jacques Demy	Uncredited
1971	Laisse aller... c'est une valse	Bar owner	Georges Lautner	
1973	Elle court, elle court la banlieue	Bouboule	Gérard Pirès	
1973	L'An 01	Chief	Jacques Doillon; Alain Resnais; Jean Rouch	
1973	Themroc	Male neighbour	Claude Faraldo	
1973	Le grand bazar	Man visiting the apartement	Claude Zidi	
1976	Les vécés étaient fermés de l'intérieur	Inspector Charbonnier	Patrice Leconte	
1976	L'aile ou la cuisse	Gérard Duchemin	Claude Zidi	
1977	Drôles de zèbres	The chef	Guy Lux	Cameo
1977	Vous n'aurez pas l'Alsace et la Lorraine	King Gros Pif I	Coluche; Marc Monnet	
1980	Inspector Blunder	Michel Clément	Claude Zidi	
1981	Signé Furax	Double agent 098 / 099	Marc Simenon	Cameo
1981	Le Maître d'école	Gérard Barbier	Claude Berri	
1982	Elle voit des nains partout!	Halberdier	Jean-Claude Sussfeld	Cameo
1982	Deux heures moins le quart avant Jésus-Christ	Ben-Hur Marcel	Jean Yanne	
1983	Banzaï	Michel Bernardin	Claude Zidi	
1983	My Best Friend's Girl	Micky	Bertrand Blier	
1983	So Long, Stooge	Lambert	Claude Berri	
1984	Good King Dagobert	King Dagobert	Dino Risi	
1984	La vengeance du serpent à plumes	Loulou Dupin	Gérard Oury	
1985	Les Rois du gag	Georges	Claude Zidi	
1985	Sac de noeuds	Coyotte	Josiane Balasko	
1985	Madman at War	Oscar Pilli	Dino Risi	(final film role)
