= Marcelle Ranson-Hervé =

French actress (1929–2020)

- Born: 10 October 1929; Marseille, France
- Died: 3 April 2020 (aged 90); Marseille, France
- Occupation: Actress

Marcelle Ranson-Hervé (10 October 1929 – 3 April 2020) was a French actress.

== Biography ==
Ranson-Hervé was born in Marseille. Her father, Louis Rançon, was an orchestra conductor, who conducted musicians such as Annie Cordy, Bourvil, and Georges Guétary. Her grandfather, Anthonin Rançon, ran a movie theater in Auriol, which hosted Fernandel.

Ranson-Hervé entered the Conservatoire de Paris in 1949, and was in a graduating class alongside Jean Rochefort and Jean-Paul Belmondo. She had a long career as an actress, and gave music lessons at the Conservatoire de Rosny-sous-Bois.

Marcelle Ranson-Hervé died on 3 April 2020 in Marseille at the age of 90 due to COVID-19.

== Filmography ==
=== Cinema ===
- Une gueule comme la mienne (1960)
- Croesus (1960)
- Les Mauvais Coups (1960)
- Les Arnaud (1967)
- To Die of Love (1970)
- Now Where Did the 7th Company Get to? (1973)
- Robert et Robert (1978)
- La Gueule de l'autre (1979)

=== Television ===
- Les Cing Dernières Minutes (1958)
- Macbeth (1959)
- Belphegor, or Phantom of the Louvre (1965)
- L'Homme qui rit (1972)
- Au théâtre ce soir (1972–1981)
- Joseph Balsamo (1973)
- Les Folies Offenbach 3 (1977)
