= Naked Autumn =

- French theatrical poster
- French: Les Mauvais Coups
- Directed by: François Leterrier
- Screenplay by: François Leterrier; Roger Vailland
- Based on: The novel of same name by Roger Vailland
- Produced by: Jean Thuillier
- Starring: Simone Signoret; Reginald Kernan; Alexandra Stewart
- Cinematography: Jean Badal
- Music by: Maurice Leroux
- Production company: Les Editions Cinégraphiques
- Distributed by: 20th Century-Fox
- Release date: 17 April 1961
- Running time: 98 minutes
- Country: France
- Language: French

Naked Autumn (French: Les mauvais coups; French pronunciation: [le movɛ ku]) is a 1961 French psychological drama about the tragic demise of a 10-year marriage, based on Roger Vailland's novel of the same title. The film was cowritten and directed by François Leterrier in his directorial debut. The film stars Simone Signoret and Reginald Kernan.

== Plot ==
Milan and Roberte have been married for ten years. Since Milan has retired from auto racing following the death of his best friend, their relationship has started to deteriorate badly. Roberte drowns her sorrows in alcohol, while Milan spends his days hunting in the countryside. The arrival of an attractive young schoolteacher in the village threatens to shatter what remains of their fragile marriage.

== Cast ==
- Simone Signoret as Roberte
- Reginald Kernan as Milan
- Alexandra Stewart as Hélène
- Marcello Pagliero as Luigi
- Serge Rousseau as Duval
- Nicole Chollet
- José Luis de Vilallonga as Prévieux
- Dorian Leigh Parker
- Marie-Claude Poirier
- Marcelle Ranson-Hervé
- Antoine Roblot
- Serge Sauvion as the veterinarian

== Legacy ==
In 2025, a 4K restored print was screened in the Cinéma de la Plage section of the 78th Cannes Film Festival, anticipating the film's 60-year anniversary.
