= Banzaï =

- Theatrical release poster
- Directed by: Claude Zidi
- Written by: Claude Zidi; Didier Kaminka; Michel Fabre
- Produced by: Claude Berri
- Starring: Coluche
- Cinematography: Jean-Jacques Tarbes
- Edited by: Nicole Saunier
- Music by: Vladimir Cosma
- Production companies: Renn Productions; Carthago film
- Distributed by: AMLF
- Release date: 1983 (France)
- Running time: 102 minutes
- Country: France

Banzaï is a 1983 French comedy film directed by Claude Zidi and starring Coluche. The film was released in France on March 23, 1983.

== Plot ==
Michel Bernardin works at Planet Assistance, an organisation that helps out Frenchmen who are in trouble in foreign countries.

== Behind the scenes ==
- The picture was shot in Hong Kong, the United States, Africa and France and has become a cult film.
- According to Valérie Mairesse, Coluche suggested her as a replacement for singer actress Karen Cheryl (aka Isabelle Morizet), first cast as his girlfriend, when the latter's agent opposed to her involvement in that production.

== Cast and roles ==
- Coluche - Michel Bernardin
- Valérie Mairesse - Isabelle Parisse
- Marthe Villalonga - Madame Bernardin
- Éva Darlan - Carole
- Zabou Breitman - Sophia
- Didier Kaminka - Cousin Paul
- Pascal N'Zonzi - Police Chief
- François Perrot - The boss of 'Mondial S.O.S.'
