= Johnny Jebsen =

World War II British double agent

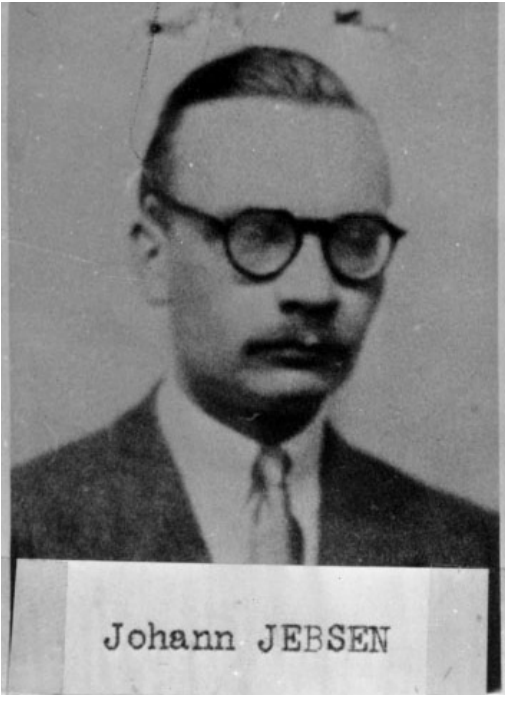
- Born: Johann-Nielsen Jebsen; 1917; Hamburg, Germany
- Died: February 1945 (aged 27–28); Location unknown, presumed to have died in Berlin, Germany
- Espionage activity
- Allegiance: United Kingdom
- Service branch: Security Service (MI5)
- Service years: 1943–1945
- Codename: Artist

Johann-Nielsen Jebsen, nicknamed "Johnny", was an anti-Nazi German intelligence officer and British double agent (code name ARTIST) during World War II. Jebsen recruited Dušan Popov (who became the British agent Tricycle) to the Abwehr and through him later joined the Allied cause. Kidnapped from Lisbon by the Germans shortly before the 1944 Normandy landings, Jebsen was tortured in prison and spent time in a concentration camp before disappearing; he was presumed killed at the end of the war.

In a 2012 reassessment of the Allies' use of double agents in World War II, historian Ben Macintyre called Jebsen a hero. Despite months of torture from the Sicherheitsdienst and later Gestapo, Jebsen refused to talk and protected not only his friend Popov, but the thousands of Allied troops due to land in Normandy, at the expense of his own life.

Jebsen features extensively in Popov's book Spy-Counterspy.

== Early life ==
Jebsen was born in Hamburg in 1917, heir to the shipping firm Jebsen & Jessen. His parents, who both died while Jebsen was still a child, were of Danish origin, but held German citizenship after they had moved the company to the country. Early in his life, Jebsen considered his citizenship a convenience, with deep roots remaining in his Danish ancestry. During childhood, he visited England and became enamoured with the country, adopting the mannerisms and the language.

Jebsen attended the University of Freiburg during the 1930s, where he became close friends with Duško Popov. During this time, both showed distaste for the Nazi regime that was emerging in Germany. After graduation, Jebsen moved to England, intending to study at Oxford University, although it appears he never did this. Over the next few years he moved amongst the London social set, befriending P. G. Wodehouse amongst others.

== Second World War ==
At the outset of World War II, Jebsen joined the German military intelligence agency, the Abwehr, largely to avoid compulsory service in the army. He was given a vague brief as an independent "researcher" and assigned the rank of private. In reality, it meant he could continue his normal activities as an international businessman, so long as he was available to help the Abwehr when it required.

In 1940, Jebsen arranged an introduction between a senior Abwehr officer in Belgrade and Duško Popov, whom the Germans hoped to recruit as an agent. The meeting led to Popov's recruitment, upon which he instantly offered his services to the Allies as a double agent. It is likely that Jebsen knew this early on and often passed information to Popov, who believed it was intended for Allied hands.

During the war, Jebsen travelled freely on business although it was not clear what he did. He married Eleonore Bothilde Peterson, an actress from Frankfurt, but had a string of mistresses across Europe. Jebsen's anti-Nazi stance led to clashes with the SS and its intelligence office, the Sicherheitsdienst.

Through 1943, Jebsen, Popov and Popov's brother Ivo (also an agent, codenamed DREADNOUGHT) ran an operation to recruit double agents from Yugoslavia. Ivo Popov identified potential candidates who were told they would be working for the British. First, they were sent to Berlin, under the care of Jebsen, for training in the spy school, before ultimately ending up in Britain (via Spain and Portugal) to work for MI5.

== Kidnapping and torture ==
Gestapo headquarters in Berlin, where Jebsen was held in a basement cell

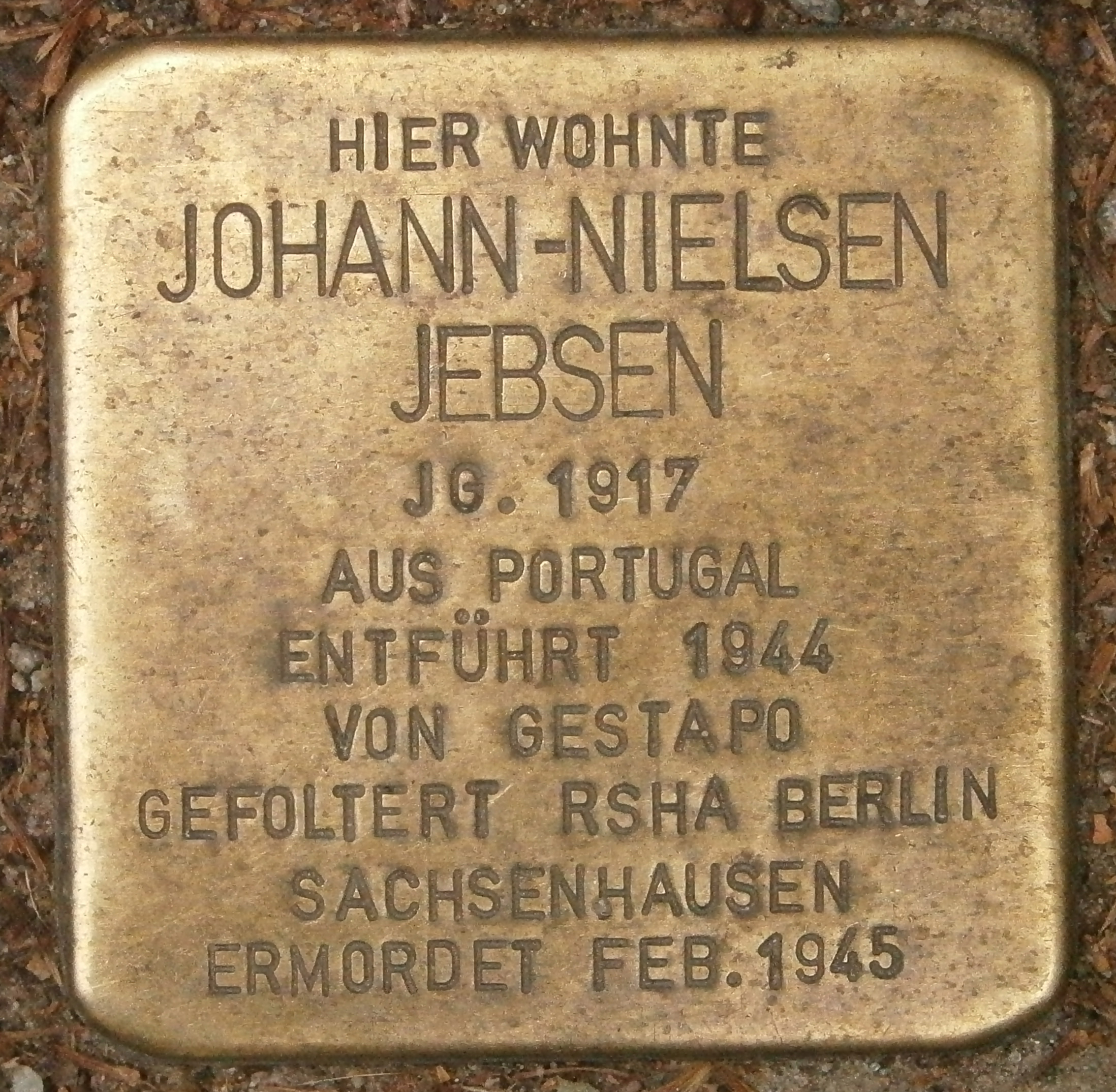
Stolperstein for Jebsen in Hamburg, Hartungstraße 7

On 29 April 1944, Jebsen was abducted from Lisbon, Portugal, and driven overnight to France. Aloys Schreiber, the head of German counter-intelligence in Lisbon, had invited Jebsen to his office on the pretext of discussing his pending War Merit Medal. After a brief struggle, Jebsen and his friend (Heinz Moldenhauer) were overpowered and bundled into a car.

Jebsen's disappearance was a serious concern for the Allies. He had been privy to a great deal of information, including knowledge of Popov's double agent role and that Agent GARBO's network of subagents was a fiction. He also, most importantly, had familiarity with many details of Operation Fortitude. If he talked, the entire cover plan for the Normandy landings was at risk. After much analysis, the intelligence services decided that Jebsen had been snatched because the Abwehr believed he was planning to defect, rather than that he had already turned. It is possible that Jebsen was abducted to protect Popov, whom the Germans considered one of their most important agents. As a precaution, the Allies suspended Popov's network of fictional subagents and his transmissions to his German handlers.

Jebsen was first taken to the Gestapo headquarters in Berlin where his torture and interrogation began. After a few weeks, the Allies were encouraged, intercepts of German communications showed the Germans were interested in Jebsen's finances (he had been defrauding a number of SS officers), and there was no mention of his activities as an agent. As time progressed, it appeared that ARTIST had not cracked under pressure and the FORTITUDE deception was safe.

In July 1944, Jebsen was moved to Sachsenhausen concentration camp. When he arrived he had broken ribs and was malnourished, but still harboured thoughts of escape. He told Allied soldiers, also held in the camp, that he had been accused of helping the British and when he had refused to talk, his financial fraud had been investigated. Eventually, he got a message to London via British Commando Jack Churchill, but the War Office had no record of Jebsen's name and so the plea for help was ignored. In February 1945, Gestapo agents removed Jebsen from Sachsenhausen, the last sighting of him, and he is presumed to have been murdered soon after. Several attempts to find him after the war were unsuccessful and he was declared legally dead on 17 February 1950.

== See also ==
- List of people who disappeared
- Double-Cross System
