= Something Fishy (film) =

Pas très catholique Something Fishy
- French theatrical release poster
- Directed by: Tonie Marshall
- Written by: Tonie Marshall
- Produced by: Michel Propper; Frédéric Bourboulon
- Starring: Anémone
- Cinematography: Dominique Chapuis
- Edited by: Jacques Comets
- Music by: Jean-Michel Kajdan
- Distributed by: Ariane Distribution
- Release date: 6 April 1994
- Running time: 100 minutes
- Country: France
- Language: French

Pas très catholique (Not Very Catholic, English title Something Fishy) is a 1994 French comedy film written and directed by Tonie Marshall. It was entered into the 44th Berlin International Film Festival.

== Plot ==
Years ago Maxime left her husband and child to strike out on her own, out of her upper class background and into a more bohemian lifestyle, chain-smoking and having affairs with lovers of both sexes. Now a private detective, her boss tasks Maxime with training the new person (and the boss's lover). She also finds that her path has crossed with her ex-husband and son as a result of her latest case involving real estate fraud and murders.

== Cast ==
- Anémone : Maxime Chabrier
- Michel Roux : Andre Dutemps
- Roland Bertin : Monsieur Paul
- Christine Boisson : Florence
- Denis Podalydès : Martin
- Grégoire Colin : Baptiste Vaxelaire
- Michel Didym : Jacques Devinals
- Micheline Presle : Mme. Loussine
- Bernard Verley : Noel Vaxelaire
- Josiane Stoléru

== Reception ==
Derek Elley reviewed the film for Variety, writing that "Though dominated by a striking, lived-in performance from Gallic comedienne Anemone, "Something Fishy" is too easygoing for its own good." Carrie Tarr and Brigitte Rollet cover the film in Cinema and the Second Sex, stating that "Marshall's empathy with her original, outspoken heroine is obvious in the endless close-ups of Anémone/Max's aging, unconventionally attractive face and body, and the way she is constantly in shot, by day and by night, in the streets of Paris and in her bedsit or office, on the move and at rest, insolent and melancholy."

In Fifty Years Berlinale Wolfgang Jacobson et al noted that the movie was the "surprise of the competition" at the 44th Berlin International Film Festival.
