= The Grand Highway =

- Directed by: Jean-Loup Hubert
- Written by: Jean-Loup Hubert
- Produced by: Pascal Hommais; Jean Francois Lepetit
- Starring: Richard Bohringer; Anémone
- Cinematography: Claude Lecomte
- Edited by: Raymonde Guyot
- Music by: Georges Granier
- Distributed by: Acteurs Auteurs Associés
- Release date: 1987
- Running time: 104 minutes
- Country: France
- Language: French

Le grand chemin is a 1987 French film directed by Jean-Loup Hubert. It was released in the U.S. as The Grand Highway, and was remade in 1991 as Paradise.

It won the César Award for Best Actor and Best Actress.

== Plot ==
Louis, a timid nine-year-old boy from Paris, spends his summer vacation in a small town in Brittany. His mother Claire has lodged him with her girlfriend Marcelle and her husband Pelo while she is having her second baby. There Louis makes friends with Martine, the ten-year-old girl next door, and learns about life from her. His subsequent adventures run the gamut from delightful to terrifying, with a little "coming of age" (via a few glimpses of nudity) thrown in.

== Cast ==
- Richard Bohringer – Pelo
- Anémone – Marcelle
- Antoine Hubert – Louis
- Christine Pascal – Claire
- Pascale Roberts – Yvonne
- Vanessa Guedj – Martine

== Production ==
Le grand chemin was directed by Jean-Loup Hubert, and produced by Pascal Hommais and Jean Francois Lepetit. The film was released in the U.S. as The Grand Highway, in French with English subtitles. Claude Lecomte served as director of photography, with camera operator Jean Paul Meurisse and film editor Raymonde Guyot. The musical score was composed by Georges Granier; the original soundtrack music was reissued in 2013 by Canadian label Disques Cinemusique.

== Reception ==
Richard Bohringer and Anémone won César Awards for Best Actor and Best Actress. The film was nominated for Best Foreign Language Film of the year by the U.S. National Board of Review.
