= Duško Popov =

Serbian WWII double agent (1912–1981)

Duško Popov OBE
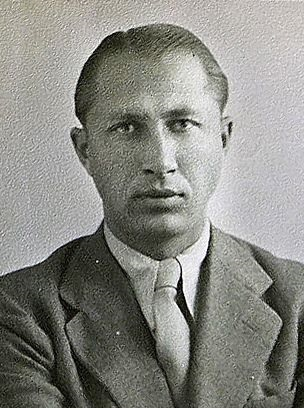
- Duško Popov, 1941
- Born: Dušan Popov; 10 July 1912; Titel, Austria-Hungary (present-day Serbia)
- Died: 18 August 1981 (aged 69); Opio, Alpes-Maritimes, France
- Education: University of Belgrade; University of Freiburg
- Occupations: Lawyer, businessman, intelligence officer
- Spouse(s): Janine Ducasse (1946–1961; divorced); Jill Jonsson (1962–1981; his death)
- Children: 4
- Parent(s): Milorad Popov, Zora Popov
- Awards: Iron Cross; Order of the British Empire
- Espionage activity
- Allegiance: (Kingdom of Yugoslavia) Yugoslavia; United Kingdom
- Service branch: VOA, MI6, Abwehr
- Service years: 1940–1945
- Codename: Duško
- Codename: Ivan
- Codename: Tricycle
- Codename: Scoot
- Operations: World War II

Dušan "Duško" Popov (Serbian Cyrillic: Душко Попов; 10 July 1912 – 10 August 1981) was a Serbian intelligence agent, lawyer and businessman who served as a double agent for MI6 during World War II. Feigning to be an asset of the German Abwehr, he passed off disinformation to Germany as part of the British Double-Cross System while occasionally using cover as a diplomat for the Yugoslav government-in-exile in London.

Popov was born into a wealthy family and was practising law at the start of the war. He held a great aversion to Nazism, and in 1940, infiltrated the Abwehr, Germany's military intelligence service, which considered him a valuable asset due to his business connections in France and the United Kingdom. Popov provided the Germans with misleading and inaccurate information for much of the war.

Deceptions in which he participated included Operation Fortitude, which sought to convince German military planners that the Allied invasion of Europe would take place in Calais, not Normandy, thereby diverting hundreds of thousands of German troops and increasing the likelihood that Operation Overlord would succeed.

Popov was known for his lifestyle and courted women during his missions, including the French actress Simone Simon. Apart from MI6 and the Abwehr, he also reported to the Yugoslav intelligence service, which assigned him the codename Duško. His German handlers referred to him by the codename Ivan. He was codenamed Tricycle by the British MI5 because he was the head of a group of three double agents.

In 1974, he published an autobiography titled Spy/Counterspy, in which he recounted his wartime exploits. Popov is considered one of Ian Fleming's primary inspirations for the character of James Bond. He has been the subject of a number of non-fiction books and documentaries.

== Early life ==
Dušan Popov was born to a Serb family in Titel, Austria-Hungary on 10 July 1912. (Note: Titel lies in present-day Serbia.) His parents were Milorad and Zora Popov. He had an older brother named Ivan ("Ivo") (who also became an agent, codenamed Dreadnought) and a younger brother named Vladan. The family was very wealthy and owed its fortune to Popov's paternal grandfather, Omer, a wealthy banker and industrialist. They hailed from the village of Karlovo (now Novo Miloševo). Records from as early as 1773 describe them as the most affluent family there. Popov's father expanded the family's business interests to include real estate dealings. When Popov was an infant, the family left Titel and permanently relocated to their summer residence in Dubrovnik, which was their home for much of the year. They also had a manor in Belgrade, where they spent the winter months.

Popov's childhood coincided with a series of significant political changes in the Balkans. The young Popov, however, and his family enjoyed a luxurious lifestyle and were far removed from the political turmoil in the country. They boasted a sizeable collection of villas and yachts, and were attended by servants, even on their travels. Duško and his brothers spent most of their formative years along the Adriatic coast and were avid athletes and outdoorsmen.

Popov's father indulged his sons, building a spacious villa by the sea for their exclusive use where they could entertain their friends and host expensive parties. He was also insistent that they receive a quality education. Apart from his native Serbian, Popov was fluent in Italian, German and French by his teenage years. Between the ages of 12 and 16, he attended a lycée in Paris.

In 1929, Popov's father enrolled him into Ewell Castle, a prestigious preparatory school in Surrey. Popov's stint at the school proved to be short lived. After only four months, he was expelled following an altercation with a teacher. He had previously endured a caning at the teacher's hands after being caught smoking a cigarette. Another caning was adjudicated after Popov missed a detention; to evade further corporal punishment, Popov grabbed the teacher's cane and snapped it in two before his classmates. Popov's father subsequently enrolled him at Lycée Hoche, a secondary institution in Versailles, which he attended for the following two years.

== Student activism ==
At the age of 18, Popov enrolled in the University of Belgrade, seeking an undergraduate degree in law. Over the next four years, he became a familiar face in Belgrade's cafes and nightclubs and had the reputation of a womaniser or ladies' man. "Women ... found him irresistible," Times columnist Ben Macintyre writes, "with his easy manner, loose, sensual mouth ... and green ... bedroom eyes." In 1934, Popov enrolled in the University of Freiburg, intent on securing a doctorate in law. Germany had only recently come under the rule of Adolf Hitler and the Nazi Party, but at the time, Popov paid little regard to politics. He had chosen Freiburg because it was relatively close to his native country and he was eager to improve his German-language skills. Germany was already the site of mass book burnings, the first concentration camps had been established and the systematic persecution of Jews had commenced.

Popov began his studies at the University of Freiburg in the autumn of 1935, and in subsequent months, began showing greater interest in politics and voiced his political opinions more vigorously. Around the same time, he befriended a fellow student, Johnny Jebsen, the son of a German shipping magnate. The two grew close, largely due to their raucous lifestyle and a shared interest in sports vehicles. In 1936–37, Popov began participating in debates at the Ausländer Club, which were held every other Friday evening. He was disappointed that many foreign students appeared to be swayed by the pro-Nazi arguments espoused there. Popov discovered that the German debaters were all hand-picked party members who chose the subject of each debate beforehand and vigorously rehearsed Nazi talking points. He persuaded Jebsen, then the president of the club, to inform him of the debate topics in advance and passed this information along to the British and American debaters. Popov himself delivered two speeches at the club, arguing in favour of democracy. He also wrote several articles for the Belgrade daily Politika, ridiculing the Nazis. "Duško despised Nazism," biographer Larry Loftis writes, "and since he wasn't German, he believed he owed no allegiance to Hitler or the state."

In the summer of 1937, Popov completed his doctoral thesis, and decided to celebrate by embarking on a trip to Paris. Before he could leave, he was arrested by the Gestapo, who accused him of being a communist. His movements had been tracked by undercover agents beforehand and his acquaintances questioned. Popov was incarcerated at the Freiburg prison without formal proceedings. When Jebsen received news of his friend's arrest, he called Popov's father and informed him of what had occurred. Popov's father contacted Yugoslav Prime Minister Milan Stojadinović, who raised the issue with Hermann Göring, and after eight days in captivity, Popov was released. He was ordered to leave Germany within 24 hours, and upon collecting his belongings, boarded a train for Switzerland. He soon arrived in Basel and found Jebsen waiting for him on the station platform. Jebsen informed Popov of the role he played in securing his release. Popov expressed gratitude and told Jebsen that if he was ever in need of any assistance he needed only ask.

== World War II ==
=== Initiation ===
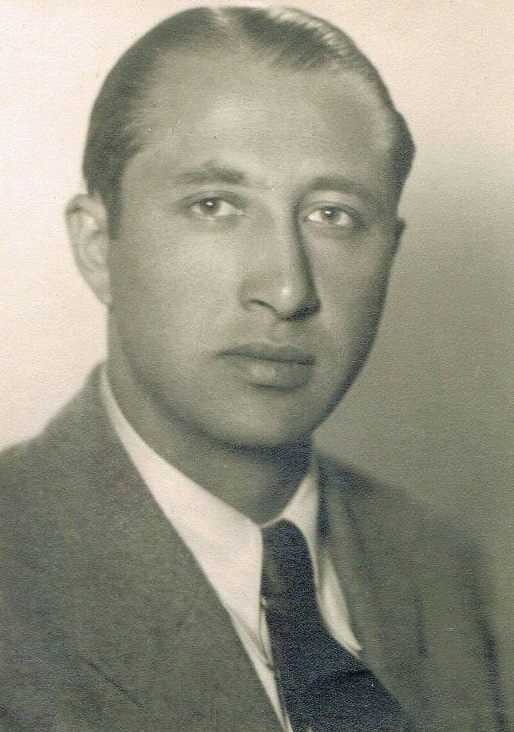
Popov, 1940

Upon his return to Dubrovnik in the fall of 1937, Popov began practising law. In February 1940, he received a message from Jebsen, asking to meet him at the Hotel Serbian King in Belgrade. Popov was shocked to find Jebsen a nervous wreck, chain smoking and drinking heavily. He told Popov that he had joined his family's shipping business after graduating from Freiburg and explained that he needed a Yugoslav shipping licence to evade the Allied naval blockade at Trieste. Popov agreed to help Jebsen, and the latter travelled back to Berlin to collect the required documentation. Two weeks later, Jebsen returned to Belgrade and informed Popov that he had joined the Abwehr, German's military intelligence service, as a Forscher (researcher).

Jebsen's ability to travel across Europe on business trips would remain unimpeded so long as he submitted reports detailing the information he had received from his business contacts. He told Popov he joined the Abwehr to avoid being conscripted into the Wehrmacht. Jebsen said military service was not an option because he suffered from varicose veins. The news came as a surprise to Popov, as his friend had previously expressed anti-Nazi views.

Popov informed Clement Hope, a passport control officer at the British legation in Yugoslavia. Hope enrolled Popov as a double agent with the codename Scoot (he was later known to his handler as Tricycle) and advised him to cooperate with Jebsen. Once accepted as a double agent, Popov moved to London. His international business activities in an import-export business provided cover for visits to neutral Portugal; its capital, Lisbon, was linked to the UK by a weekly civilian air service for most of the war. Popov used his cover position to report periodically to his Abwehr handlers in Portugal. Popov fed enough MI6-approved information to the Germans to keep them happy and unaware of his actions, and was well paid for his services. The assignments given to him were of great value to the British in assessing enemy plans and thinking.

An important deception of his was convincing the Germans that the D-Day landings would be in Calais, not Normandy. He was able to report back to MI6 that they had swallowed the bait.

All the while Popov was famous for his playboy lifestyle, while carrying out perilous wartime missions for the British.

=== Allegations regarding Pearl Harbor ===
In 1941, Popov repeatedly travelled to Portugal during his missions. He stayed in Estoril, at the Hotel Palácio, in January and March 1941, then again between 29 June and 10 August 1941. During his stay, he met Ian Fleming, at the time working for the British Royal Navy. They shared a mission at Casino Estoril, and it is believed that Popov served as inspiration for the character of James Bond in Fleming’s novels.

After this last stay, he was dispatched to the United States by the Abwehr to establish a new German network. He was given ample funds and an intelligence questionnaire (a list of intelligence targets, later published as an appendix to J.C. Masterman's book The Double Cross System). Of the three typewritten pages of the questionnaire, one was devoted to highly detailed questions about US defences at Pearl Harbor on the Hawaiian island of Oahu. He made contact with the FBI and explained what he had been asked to do.

During a televised interview, Duško Popov related having informed the FBI on 12 August 1941 of the impending attack on Pearl Harbor. Either the FBI chief J. Edgar Hoover did not report this fact to his superiors or they, for reasons of their own, took no action.

Hoover distrusted Popov because he was a double agent, although MI6 had told the FBI in New York City that he would be arriving. Popov himself said Hoover was quite suspicious and distrustful of him. According to author William "Mole" Wood, when Hoover discovered Popov had brought a woman from New York State to Florida, he threatened to have him arrested under the Mann Act if he did not leave the US immediately.

Popov borrowed £10,000 from his lover, the French film actress Simone Simon, in late 1942 (equivalent to £600,000 in 2025) shortly before he left for Portugal. He did not repay her when they broke up in 1943.

=== Operation Fortitude ===
In 1944, Popov became a key part of the deception operation codenamed Fortitude, an Allied effort to convince Germany that the invasion of Europe would target Calais rather than Normandy. At the time of the operation, he was staying in Portugal. He stayed in Estoril once again, at the Hotel Palácio, between 31 March and 12 April 1944. When Jebsen was arrested by the Gestapo in Lisbon, the British feared Popov had been compromised and ceased giving him critical information to pass along to the Germans. It was later discovered that the Abwehr still regarded Popov as an asset and he was brought back into use by the British. Jebsen's death at the hands of the Nazis had a profound emotional impact on Popov.

== Later life ==
In 1972, John Cecil Masterman published The Double Cross System in the War of 1939 to 1945, an intimate account of wartime British military deception. Before its publication, Popov had no intention of revealing his wartime activities, believing that the MI6 would not allow it. Masterman's book convinced Popov that it was time to make his exploits public. In 1974, Popov published an autobiography titled Spy/Counterspy, "a racy account of his adventures that read like a James Bond novel." Russel Miller described it as "fundamentally accurate, if occasionally embellished". Several of the events described in the book were either entirely fictional, such as a fistfight Popov claimed to have had with a German agent, exaggerated for dramatic effect, or could not be substantiated through subsequently declassified intelligence records. Popov's wife and children were apparently unaware of his past until the book's publication.

By the early 1980s, years of chain smoking and heavy drinking had taken a toll on Popov's health. He died in Opio on 10 August 1981, aged 69. His family said his death came after a long illness. He was predeceased by his brother Ivo, who died in 1980. Shortly after Popov's death, MI6 began declassifying documents that pertained to Allied intelligence-gathering and disinformation activities during the war, thereby verifying many of his claims.

== Legacy ==
Duško Popov is considered one of the main inspirations for Ian Fleming's James Bond novels. He was the subject of a one-hour television documentary produced by Starz Inc. and Cinenova, titled True Bond, which aired in June 2007. Two other documentaries recounting Popov's exploits, The Real Life James Bond: Dusko Popov and Double Agent Dusko Popov: Inspiration for James Bond, have also been produced. Popov has also been the subject of several biographies, notably Miller's Codename Tricycle (2004) and Loftis' Into the Lion's Mouth (2016).

He is the subject of numerous podcasts, including Wondery's The Spy Who season one, The Spy Who Inspired 007 (2024), and BBC Sounds (2026).

== See also ==
- Inspirations for James Bond
- Pearl Harbor advance-knowledge debate
