= Opio, Alpes-Maritimes =

Commune in Provence-Alpes-Côte d'Azur, France

Opio
- Commune
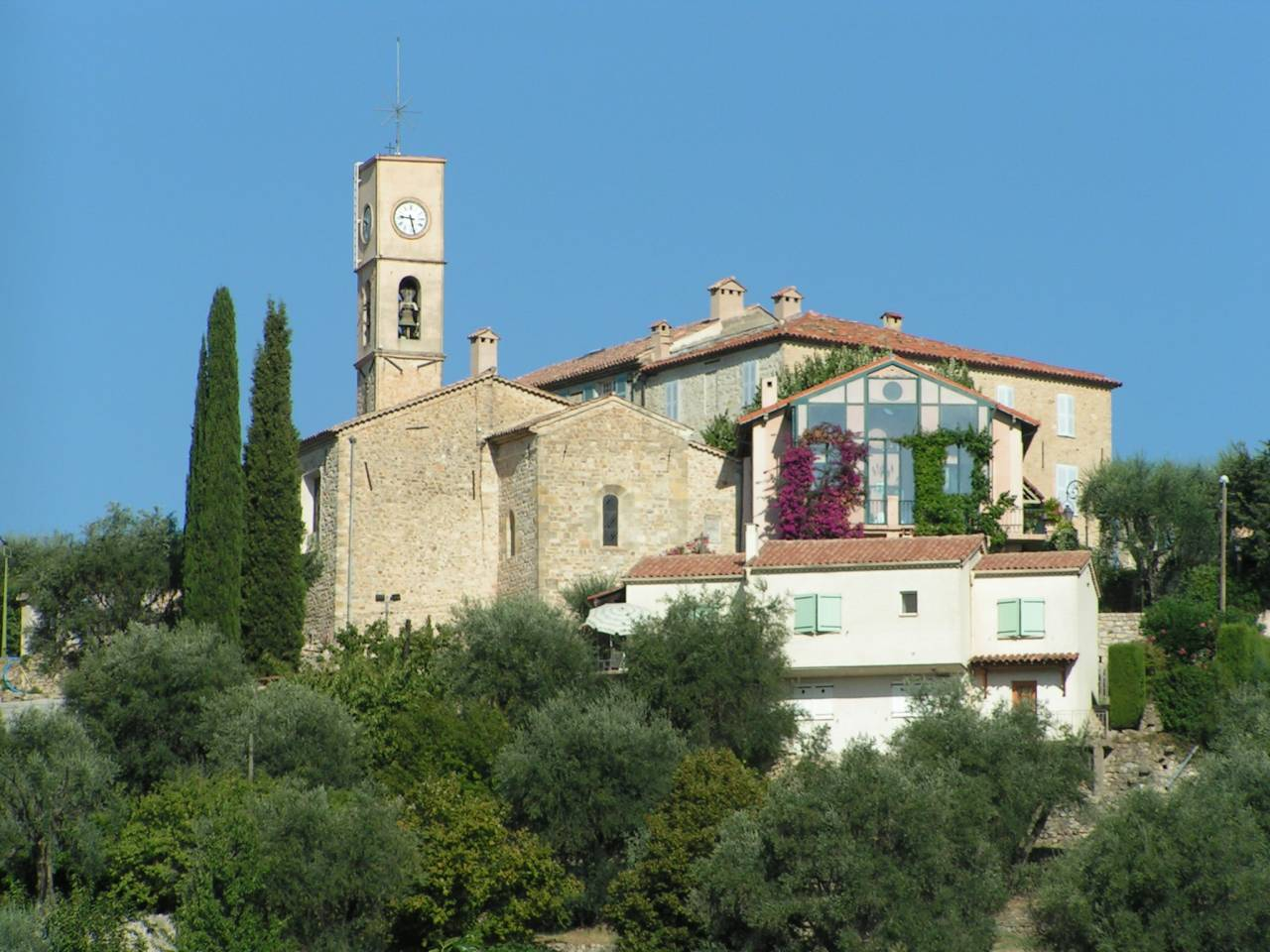
- A view of the church and surrounding buildings in Opio

- Coat of arms
- Location of Opio
- Location within France Location within Provence-Alpes-Côte d'Azur
- Coordinates: 43°40′00″N 6°59′00″E
- Country: France
- Region: Provence-Alpes-Côte d'Azur
- Department: Alpes-Maritimes
- Arrondissement: Grasse
- Canton: Valbonne
- Intercommunality: CA Sophia Antipolis

Government
  - Mayor (2026–32): Thierry Occelli (LR)
- Area^{1}: 9.47 km^{2} (3.66 sq mi)
- Highest elevation: 361 m (1,184 ft)
- Lowest elevation: 154 m (505 ft)
- Population (2023): 2,527
  - Density: 267/km^{2} (691/sq mi)
- Time zone: UTC+01:00 (CET)
  - Summer (DST): UTC+02:00 (CEST)
- INSEE/Postal code: 06089 /06650
- ^{1} French Land Register data, which excludes lakes, ponds, glaciers > 1 km^{2} (0.386 sq mi or 247 acres) and river estuaries.

Opio (French pronunciation: [ɔpjo]; Occitan: Úpia) is a commune in the Alpes-Maritimes department in southeastern France situated near Grasse.

== Population ==
Historical population
Year	Pop.	±% p.a.
1968	790	—
1975	1,021	+3.73%
1982	1,336	+3.92%
1990	1,792	+3.74%
1999	1,922	+0.78%
2007	2,133	+1.31%
2012	2,184	+0.47%
2017	2,214	+0.27%
2023	2,527	+2.23%
Source: INSEE

== Personalities ==
Coluche died in Opio at the age of 41, when his motorcycle crashed into a lorry.

Serbian triple agent Duško Popov died in Opio on 10 August 1981, aged 69.

Rear Admiral Clive Golding has a Villa on the outskirts of the village.

== See also ==
- Communes of the Alpes-Maritimes department
