= Martin Lamotte =

French actor, comedian and director (born 1947)

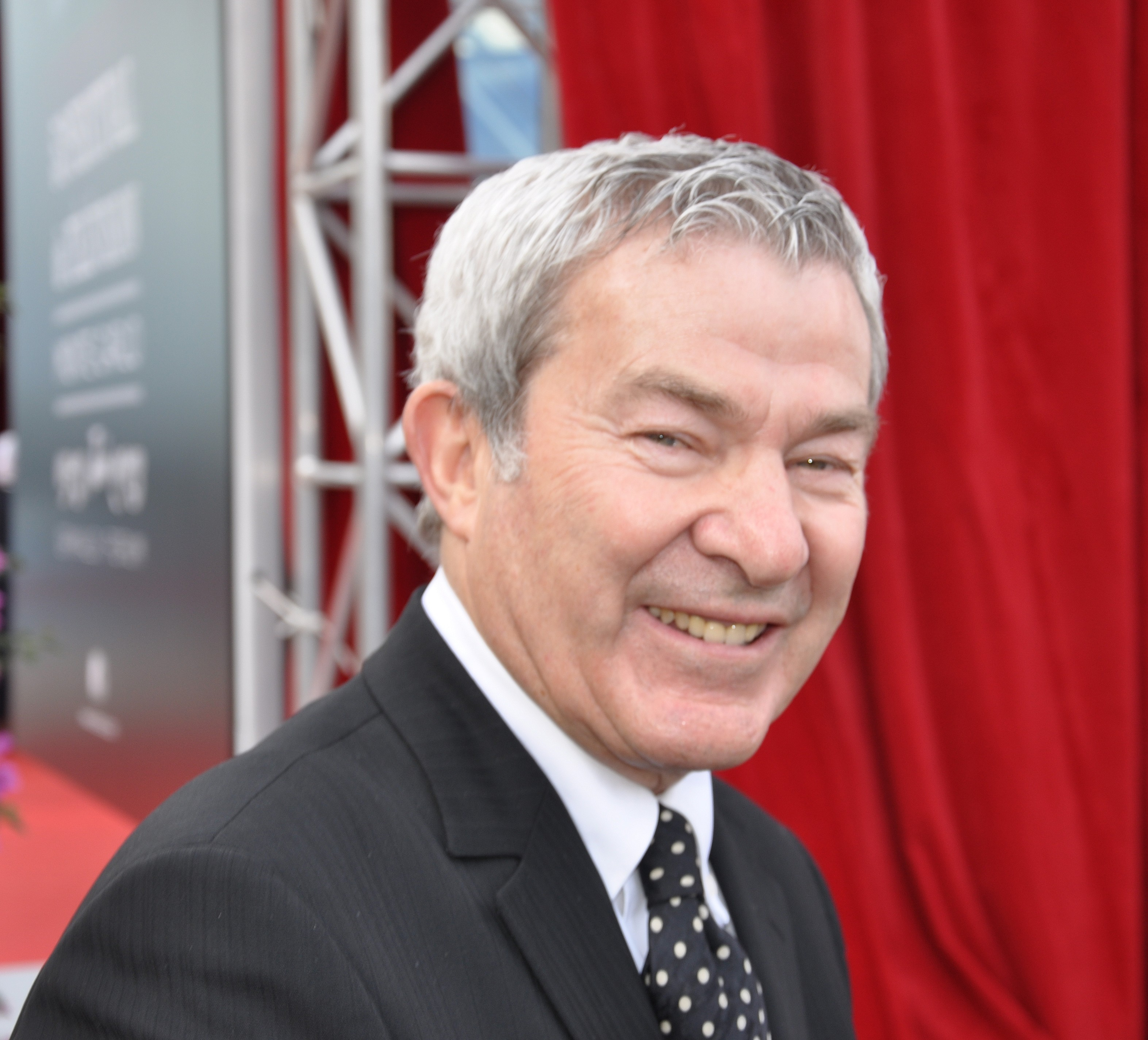
- Born: 2 June 1947 (age 78); Paris, France
- Occupation(s): Actor, Comedian, Director
- Years active: 1973–present

Martin Lamotte (French pronunciation: [maʁtɛ̃ lamɔt]; born 2 June 1947) is a French actor, comedian and director. He participated in several films alongside Le Splendid. He is most known for his role on the TV Series "SoeurThérèse.com" and "Nos chers voisins".

== Filmography ==
Year	Title	Role	Director	Notes
1973	L'An 01		Jacques Doillon	
1976	The Wing or the Thigh	Roland	Claude Zidi	
1977	Spoiled Children	Anne's friend	Bertrand Tavernier	
1977	Vous n'aurez pas l'Alsace et la Lorraine	The Jester	Coluche	
1978	Pauline et l'ordinateur	Martin	Francis Fehr	
1978	Si vous n'aimez pas ça, n'en dégoûtez pas les autres	A spectator	Raymond Lewin	
1978	Les Bronzés	Miguel	Patrice Leconte	
1979	Heroes Are Not Wet Behind the Ears	The groom	Charles Nemes	
1980	Inspector Blunder	Inspector Gaffuri	Claude Zidi (2)	
1981	Les hommes préfèrent les grosses	Paul Berthellot	Jean-Marie Poiré	
1981	Les Babas Cool	Gilles	François Leterrier	
1982	Elle voit des nains partout!	Prince Charming	Jean-Claude Sussfeld	
1982	Le Père Noël est une ordure	Mr. Leble	Jean-Marie Poiré (2)	
1982	Le quart d'heure américain	Joël	Philippe Galland	
1982	Le mystère du gala maudit ou La fabuleuse aventure du grand orchestre du Splendid		Bernard Lion	TV movie
1983	Circulez y a rien à voir!	The cook	Patrice Leconte (2)	
1983	One Deadly Summer	Georges Massigne	Jean Becker	
1983	Debout les crabes, la mer monte!	Louis	Jean-Jacques Grand-Jouan	
1983	Papy fait de la résistance	Guy-Hubert Bourdelle	Jean-Marie Poiré (3)	
1984	Viva la vie	TV Journalist	Claude Lelouch	
1984	La smala	The monk	Jean-Loup Hubert	
1985	Tranches de vie	Alain	François Leterrier (2)	
1985	Le mariage du siècle	Guillaume	Philippe Galland (2)	
1985	Asterix Versus Caesar	Voice	Paul and Gaëtan Brizzi	
1985	Gros dégueulasse	The lifeguard	Bruno Zincone	
1986	La gitane	The Commissioner	Philippe de Broca	
1986	Le coeur du voyage	Zéphirin	François Leterrier (3)	TV movie
1986	Twist again à Moscou	Boris Pikov	Jean-Marie Poiré (4)	
1987	Sale destin	Denis	Sylvain Madigan	
1987	L'île		François Leterrier (4)	TV mini-series
1987	Tant qu'il y aura des femmes	Sacha	Didier Kaminka	
1987	Fucking Fernand	Lafouine	Gérard Mordillat	
1987	L'oeil au beur(re) noir	Jean-René Perron	Serge Meynard	
1988	Fréquence meurtre	Simon Lieberman	Élisabeth Rappeneau	
1988	Envoyez les violons	Frank	Roger Andrieux	
1988	Sans peur et sans reproche	Louis XII	Gérard Jugnot	
1988	L'excès contraire	Konrad	Yves-André Hubert	TV movie
1989	Après la guerre	Victor Toulis	Jean-Loup Hubert (2)	
1989	À corps et à cris	Bernard Terrier	Josée Dayan	TV movie
1989	L'Orchestre rouge	Kent	Jacques Rouffio	
1989	Fantômes sur l'oreiller	Serge	Pierre Mondy	TV movie
1990	Imogène	Mulot	François Leterrier (5)	TV series (1 episode)
1990	Bienvenue à bord!	Martin Placard	Jean-Louis Leconte	
1990	Promotion canapé	Marcel	Didier Kaminka (2)	
1991	Les secrets professionnels du Dr Apfelglück	The Spanish		
1992	À quoi tu penses-tu?	André	Didier Kaminka (3)	
1992	Un fil à la patte	General Irrigua	Marion Sarraut	TV movie
1992	Papa veut pas que je t'épouse	Max Schmulevitz	Patrick Volson	TV movie
1992	Pierre qui brûle	Maxime	Léo Kaneman	TV movie
1992	Les taupes-niveaux	Charognat	Jean-Luc Trotignon	TV movie
1992	Hors piste		Alain Baudy	TV movie
1993	Coup de jeune	Jean-Max	Xavier Gélin	
1993	Pas d'amour sans amour!	M. Roland	Evelyne Dress	
1993	Les ténors	Maurice Chortin	Francis De Gueltz	
1994	3000 scénarios contre un virus	The pharmacist	Gérard Jugnot (2)	
1995	Police des polices	Commissioner Lorenzi	Michel Boisrond	TV series (6 episodes)
1995	Tom est tout seul	Yves Briens	Fabien Onteniente	
1995	L'hôtel du libre-échange	Pinglet	Michel Fabre	TV movie
1996	Petite soeur	Serge Botelli	Marion Sarraut (2)	TV movie
1996	Golden Boy	Jérôme Tiercelin	Jean-Pierre Vergne	
1996	Beaumarchais	Comte de la Blache	Édouard Molinaro	
1996	Fallait pas!...	Solomuka	Gérard Jugnot (3)	
1996	Un homme est tombé dans la rue		Dominique Roulet	
1997	Les démons de Jésus	Coldet	Bernie Bonvoisin	
1997	Arlette	The chief	Claude Zidi (3)	
1997	Une patronne de charme	Georges Dubreuil	Bernard Uzan	TV movie
1998	Ça reste entre nous	Richard	Martin Lamotte	
1998	Baldi	Marco Tout Court		TV series (1 episode)
1999	C'est pas ma faute!	Georgesques Monnet		
1999	Le schpountz	Brenner	Gérard Oury	
2000	Adela	Eugène	Eduardo Mignogna	
2002	L'envolé	Raphaël Pigrenet	Philippe Venault	TV movie
2002	Ma femme s'appelle Maurice	Jean-Bernard Trouabal	Jean-Marie Poiré (5)	
2002-2011	SoeurThérèse.com	Gérard Bonaventure		TV series (21 episodes)
2003	Fragile	Jacques Gendreau	Jean-Louis Milesi	TV movie Luchon International Film Festival - Best Actor
2004	Milady	Richelieu	Josée Dayan (2)	TV movie
2005	3 femmes... un soir d'été	Michel Auvignon	Sébastien Grall	TV mini-series (4 episodes)
2005	L'ombre d'un crime	Gilet	Jean Sagols	TV movie
2006	Les Bronzés 3: Amis pour la vie	Miguel	Patrice Leconte (3)	
2006	Le temps de la désobéissance	Lucas Barois	Patrick Volson (2)	TV movie
2008	Un type dans le genre de Napoléon		Emmanuel Murat	TV movie
2009	Erreur de la banque en votre faveur	Antoine	Gérard Bitton; Michel Munz	
2010	Un divorce de chien	M. Schoum	Lorraine Lévy	TV movie
2010	Au siècle de Maupassant	Monsieur Mangin	Philippe Monnier	TV series (1 episode)
2011	Une folle envie	Alfredo Abadi	Bernard Jeanjean	
2011	L'épervier	The marquis de la Motte Kerdu	Stéphane Clavier	TV series (6 episodes)
2011	Doc Martin	Victor	Stéphane Clavier (2)	TV series (1 episode)
2012	Joséphine, ange gardien	François	Pascal Heylbroeck	TV series (1 episode)
2012	Profilage	Armand Dubois	Julien Despaux	TV series (1 episode)
2012	Enquêtes réservées	François Bagnon	Christophe Barbier	TV series (1 episode)
2012-2017	Nos chers voisins	Mr. Lambert		TV series (59 episodes)

Year	Title	Director	Notes
1973	Ginette Lacaze	Coluche	Le Vrai Chic parisien
1973	Introduction à l'esthétique	Coluche (2)	Le Vrai Chic parisien
1974	Le Crépuscule des lâches	Martin Lamotte	Le Vrai Chic parisien
1974	Les Semelles de la nuit	Romain Bouteille	Café de la Gare
1975	Le Graphique de Boscop	Sotha	Café de la Gare
1976	Ginette Lacaze	Coluche (3)	Élysée Montmartre
1976	La Revanche de Louis XI	Martin Lamotte (2)	Théâtre de la Veuve Pichard
1977	Le Secret de Zonga	Martin Lamotte (3)	Théâtre de la Veuve Pichard
1979	Les Chantiers de la gloire	Luis Rego	Théâtre de l'Atelier
1981	Elle voit des nains partout	Philippe Bruneau	Théâtre de la Gaîté-Montparnasse
1982	Papy fait de la résistance	Martin Lamotte (4); Christian Clavier	Théâtre du Splendid Saint-Martin
1983	Ma vedette américaine	Pierre Mondy	Théâtre Saint-Georges
1986	L'Excès contraire	Michel Blanc	Théâtre des Bouffes-Parisiens
1989	Un fil à la patte	Pierre Mondy (2)	Théâtre du Palais-Royal; Nominated - Molière Award for Best Supporting Actor
1991	Le Crépuscule des lâches	Martin Lamotte (5)	Théâtre de la Porte Saint-Martin
1992	Sarcophagus	Jean-Luc Tardieu	Maison de la Culture de Loire-Atlantique Nantes
1993	Un couple infernal	Isabelle Nanty	Théâtre du Splendid Saint-Martin
1995	L'Hôtel du libre échange	Franck de la Personne	Théâtre de la Michodière
1997	Piscine avec souvenirs	Bernard Murat	Élysée Montmartre
1997	Espèces menacées	Éric Civanyan	Théâtre de la Michodière
1999-2001	Moi, mais ... en mieux	Jean-Claude Idée	Théâtre de la Michodière
2002	Panique au Plazza	Pierre Mondy (3)	Théâtre des Variétés
2003	Daddy Blues	Eric Civanyan (2)	Théâtre de la Michodière
2006	Le Butin	Didier Caron	Tour
2007	La Danse de l'albatros	Patrice Kerbrat	Théâtre Montparnasse
2007	Un type dans le genre de Napoléon	Bernard Murat (2)	Théâtre Édouard VII
2008	Faisons un rêve	Bernard Murat (3)	Théâtre Édouard VII
2010	Drôle de couple	Anne Bourgeois	Théâtre des Nouveautés; Tour
2012	Tartarin of Tarascon	Jérôme Savary	Théâtre André Malraux
2013	Inconnu à cette adresse	Delphine de Malherbe	Théâtre Antoine-Simone Berriau
2013	The Guitrys	Steve Suissa	Théâtre Rive Gauche
2014	Les Diablogues	Anne Bourgeois (2)	Théâtre du Palais-Royal
