= Croesus (film) =

1960 film

- Directed by: Jean Giono
- Written by: Jean Giono
- Produced by: Andrée Debar
- Starring: Fernandel; Marcelle Ranson-Hervé; Rellys
- Cinematography: Roger Hubert
- Edited by: Monique Isnardon; Robert Isnardon
- Music by: Joseph Kosma
- Production company: Les Films Jean Giono
- Distributed by: Gaumont Distribution
- Release date: 21 September 1960
- Running time: 100 minutes
- Country: France
- Language: French

Croesus (French: Crésus) is a 1960 French comedy film directed by Jean Giono and starring Fernandel, Marcelle Ranson-Hervé and Rellys.

== Cast ==
- Fernandel as Jules
- Marcelle Ranson-Hervé as Fine
- Rellys as Paul
- René Génin as Burie
- Miguel Gamy as Albert
- Edouard Hemme as Le curé
- Paul Préboist as Le maçon
- Jeanne Pérez as Marie
- Pierre Repp as L'employé de banque
- Luce Dassas as Rose
- Charles Bouillaud as Le premier gendarme
- Jeanne Mars as La femme de Paul
- Jacques Préboist as Un policier
- Etienne Fleurichamp as Émile
- Lucien Verva as Le Hébé
- Olivier Hussenot as Un policier

== Bibliography ==
- Maurice Bessy & Raymond Chirat. Histoire du cinéma français: 1956-1960. Pygmalion, 1990.
