= Vous n'aurez pas l'Alsace et la Lorraine =

1977 French comedy film

- Theatrical release poster
- Directed by: Coluche; Marc Monnet
- Written by: Coluche
- Produced by: Alain Queffelean; Georges Troisfontaines
- Starring: Coluche; Gérard Lanvin; Anémone
- Music by: Vladimir Cosma (credited as Jeff Jordan); Serge Gainsbourg (songs only)
- Production companies: Les Films du Triangle; World Productions
- Distributed by: AMLF
- Release date: October 19, 1977 (France)
- Running time: 92 minutes
- Countries: France; Belgium
- Language: French

Vous n'aurez pas l'Alsace et la Lorraine (lit. 'You shall not have Alsace and Lorraine') is a 1977 French comedy film starring Coluche, Anémone and Gérard Lanvin, and co-directed by Coluche with Marc Monnet. It functions as a parody of historical and swashbuckling films.

The title is taken from a verse of the 1871 French patriotic song Alsace et Lorraine, though the plot does not involve Alsace nor Lorraine which did not yet belong to France when the story takes place.

The film performed poorly at the box-office and was Coluche's only directorial effort.

== Plot ==
France, in the late Middle Ages. King Gros Pif (lit. 'Big Schnozzle') is an incompetent, lazy and gluttonous monarch, who neglects his duties while the tax-collecting musketeers oppress the people. The Queen consort, in league with several court members - including the jester who is also her lover - stages a coup and dethrones Gros Pif. Only the King's cousin, well-meaning but goofy Princess Lucienne, remains loyal to him. The conspirators eventually prove even worse rulers than Gros Pif.

The White Knight, a handsome and gallant, if dim-witted, swashbuckling hero, intervenes and helps Lucienne free Gros Pif from his cell. All three escape from the castle and endeavor to thwart the usurpers and restore Gros Pif to his rightful, if undeserved, throne.

The usurpers eventually succumb to infighting, after which Gros Pif is restored as king and celebrates the wedding of the White Knight and Lucienne.

As a running gag, the film includes musical interludes which consist of the White Knight repeatedly breaking into an impromptu operetta-style theme song about himself, much to the King's annoyance.

== Cast ==
- Coluche as King Gros Pif I of France
- Gérard Lanvin as the White Knight
  - Olivier Constantin as the White Knight's singing voice
- Anémone as Princess Lucienne
- Dominique Lavanant as Queen Madeleine
- Martin Lamotte as the court jester
- Michel Blanc as Antremont
- Philippe Bruneau as the Duke of Ambise
- Roland Giraud as the Duke of Orléans
- Christian Spillemaecker as Christian de Boynet
- Philippe Manesse as Philippe de Boynet
- Roger Riffard as Father L'Auriot
- Gérard Jugnot as the first captain of the Musketeers
- Luis Rego as the second captain of the Musketeers
- Jean-Jacques as the King of Flanders
- Marie-Anne Chazel as the Queen of Flanders
- Thierry Lhermitte as the chief herald
- Bruno Moynot as a courtier
- Christian Clavier as the narrator

== Production ==
Vous n'aurez pas l'Alsace et la Lorraine was the directorial debut of stand-up comedian Coluche, who had enjoyed his first major film success the previous year by co-starring with Louis de Funès in The Wing or the Thigh. Coluche, who had debuted in Parisian café-théâtres, assembled a cast of performers from that environment, many of whom would go on to achieve prominence in France. Several members of Le Splendid's troupe notably appear in supporting roles. The film was a French-Belgian coproduction, and its external scenes were originally supposed to be shot in Belgium. However, due to the Belgian co-producer's failure, filming had to be relocated to Dordogne.

== Reception ==
Despite Coluche's popularity in France, the film failed to reach expectations at the French box-office. It was also poorly received by critics. Coluche himself was disappointed by the finished product and did not renew his experience as director.

Despite the film's initial failure, television broadcasts later helped it achieve popularity among French audiences. An article in Elle about Coluche's career mentioned Vous n'aurez pas l'Alsace et la Lorraine as a cult film.

== Home media ==
The film was released on DVD in 2003. It was later released on VOD on Canal+, UniversCiné and Pathé Home.
