= François Leterrier =

French film director and actor (1929–2020)

François Leterrier (French pronunciation: [fʁɑ̃swa lətɛʁje]; 26 May 1929 – 4 December 2020) was a French film director and actor. He entered the film industry when he was cast as the lead in Robert Bresson's film A Man Escaped (1956). After this, he assisted other directors before directing his debut film in 1961.

== Life and career ==
François Leterrier studied at the University of Paris where he took a degree in philosophy. During his student years, he frequently attended the university's film club. He did his military service in Morocco, where he was discovered by the film director Robert Bresson, known for casting unknowns, who gave him the leading role in the 1956 film A Man Escaped.

After this, Leterrier was able to work as an assistant director for Louis Malle, Etienne Périer, and Yves Allégret.

His debut film as director was Les Mauvais Coups from 1961, based on a novel by Roger Vailland. He also adapted works by Jean Giono, Paul Morand, and Raymond Queneau.

François's son Louis also became a film director. He is notable for his action and blockbuster films, such as the first two Transporter films, The Incredible Hulk, Clash of the Titans, and Now You See Me.

== Filmography ==
=== Directed for film ===
- Les Mauvais Coups (1961)
- A King Without Distraction (Un roi sans divertissement) (1963)
- The Royal Chase (La Chasse royale) (1969)
- Private Screening (Projection privée) (1973)
- Goodbye Emmanuelle (1977)
- Your Turn, My Turn (Va voir maman, papa travaille) (1978)
- Rat Race (Je vais craquer) (1980)
- Les Babas Cool (1981)
- Le Garde du corps (1984)
- Tranches de vie (1985)
- The Son of the Mekong (Le Fils du Mékong) (1992)

=== Directed for television ===
- La Guêpe (1965)
- Milady (1976)
- Pierrot mon ami (1979)
- Le Voleur d'enfants (1981)
- Le Cœur du voyage (1986)
- L'Île (1987)
- Imogène (1989, 3 episodes)
- Clovis (1993, 2 episodes)
- Les Disparus de Reillanne (1993)

=== Actor ===
- A Man Escaped (1956) - Le lieutenant Fontaine
- Stavisky (1974) - André Malraux (final film role)
