= Jean-Loup Hubert =

French director and screenwriter (born 1949)

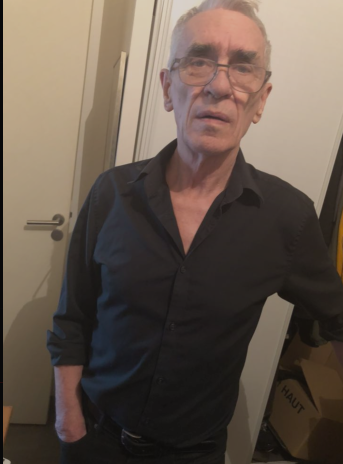
- Born: 4 October 1949 (age 76); Nantes, France
- Occupations: Director, Screenwriter
- Years active: 1981–present

Jean-Loup Hubert (born 4 October 1949) is a French director and screenwriter.

== Filmography ==
Year	Title	Role	Box office	Notes
1981	L'année prochaine... si tout va bien	Director & Writer	$3.8 million	
1984	La smala	Director & Writer	$5.8 million	
1986	La gitane	Writer	$9.4 million	
1987	The Grand Highway	Director & Writer	$23.8 million	Cleveland International Film Festival - Best Film; Montreal World Film Festival - Prize of the Ecumenical Jury; Nominated - César Award for Best Film; Nominated - César Award for Best Director; Nominated - César Award for Best Original Screenplay or Adaptation
1989	Après la guerre	Director & Writer	$10.7 million	Cinekid Festival - Cinekid Film Award
1991	La reine blanche	Director & Writer	$6.2 million	
1991	Contre l'oubli	Director	$92.000	
1993	À cause d'elle	Director & Writer		
1997	Marthe	Director & Writer	$1 million	
1999	Pulpeuse fiction	Director		Short
2000	Duel	Director & Writer		Short
2004	3 petites filles	Director & Writer	$785.000	
