= Depardieu =

Depardieu may refer to:

- Delphine Depardieu (born 1979), French actress, niece of Gérard Depardieu
- Gérard Depardieu (born 1948), French actor and filmmaker
- Élisabeth Depardieu (born 1941), French actress, writer, co-producer, ex-wife of actor Gérard Depardieu
- Guillaume Depardieu (1971–2008), French actor, son of Gérard Depardieu
- Julie Depardieu (born 1973), French actress, daughter of Gérard Depardieu
