= Nicolas Rigas =

French opera singer

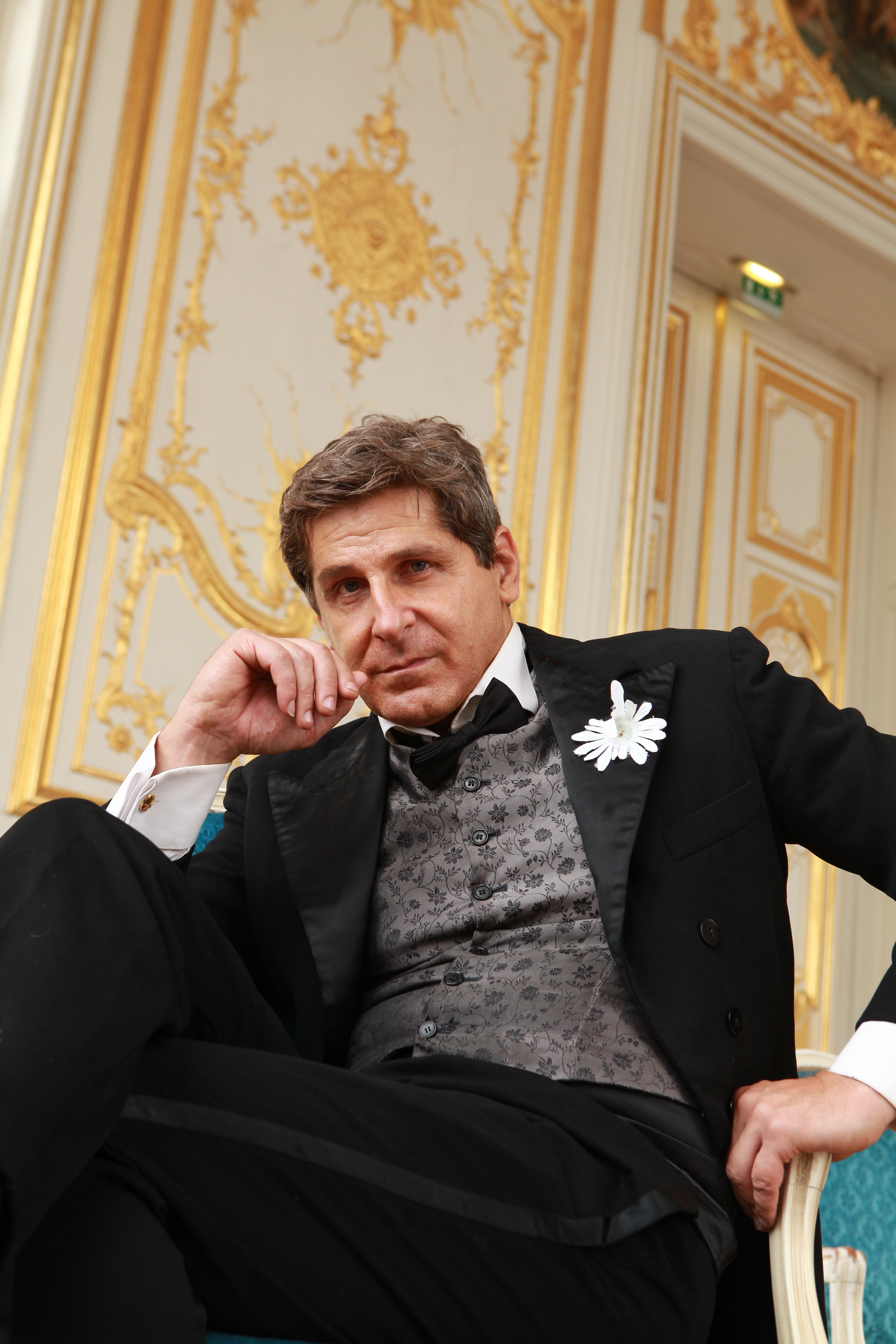
Nicolas Rigas in 2024

Nicolas Rigas is a French contemporary theatre director, actor, and baritone.

== Biography ==
Distinguished at the Talents Cannes in 2002, Rigas plays with Alexandra Lamy in Au suivant! and Artus de Penguern's Gregoire Moulin vs. Humanity.

In 2009, on the occasion of years of the Théâtre du petit monde, he directed Le Misanthrope ou l'Atrabilaire amoureux with Delphine Depardieu. Strengthened by this success and recognized for giving "modernity to the Classics", he set up Le Malade imaginaire at the Grandes Écuries du Château de Versailles from where he will make all his new creations: The Barber of Seville (adaptation of Beaumarchais by Rossini) Les Précieuses ridicules and L'École des femmes by Molière associated with Offenbach's the Tales of Hoffmann.

For the reopening of the Algiers Opera House, he staged Don Giovanni which he also sang. He is Haly in L'italiana in Algeri at the Théâtre des Champs-Élysées with Marie-Nicole Lemieux under the direction of Roger Norrington of which the musicology website says:

Nicolas Rigas's excellent Haly - a very beautiful bass baritone voice well conducted - composes a character of a falsely obsessive and amusingly funny butler.

He was "Les Quatre Diables" in The Tales of Hoffmann directed by Julie Depardieu for Opéra en plein air produced by Tristan Duval, and sang the title role of contemporary opera in The Secret Agent by Michael Dellaira at the Center for Contemporary Opera in New York and Szeged and the Opéra d'Avignon

A multi-faceted lyrical artist, he sings in both operettas, operas bouffe and classical operas in Paris, London, Montreal, New York and Montreal. and created with Martin Loizillon and female singer friends, a humorous clip on the circumflex that will make the "buzz" on the Internet and in newspapers, in response to the recommended spelling reform.
