= Alain Depardieu =

French film producer (born 1945)

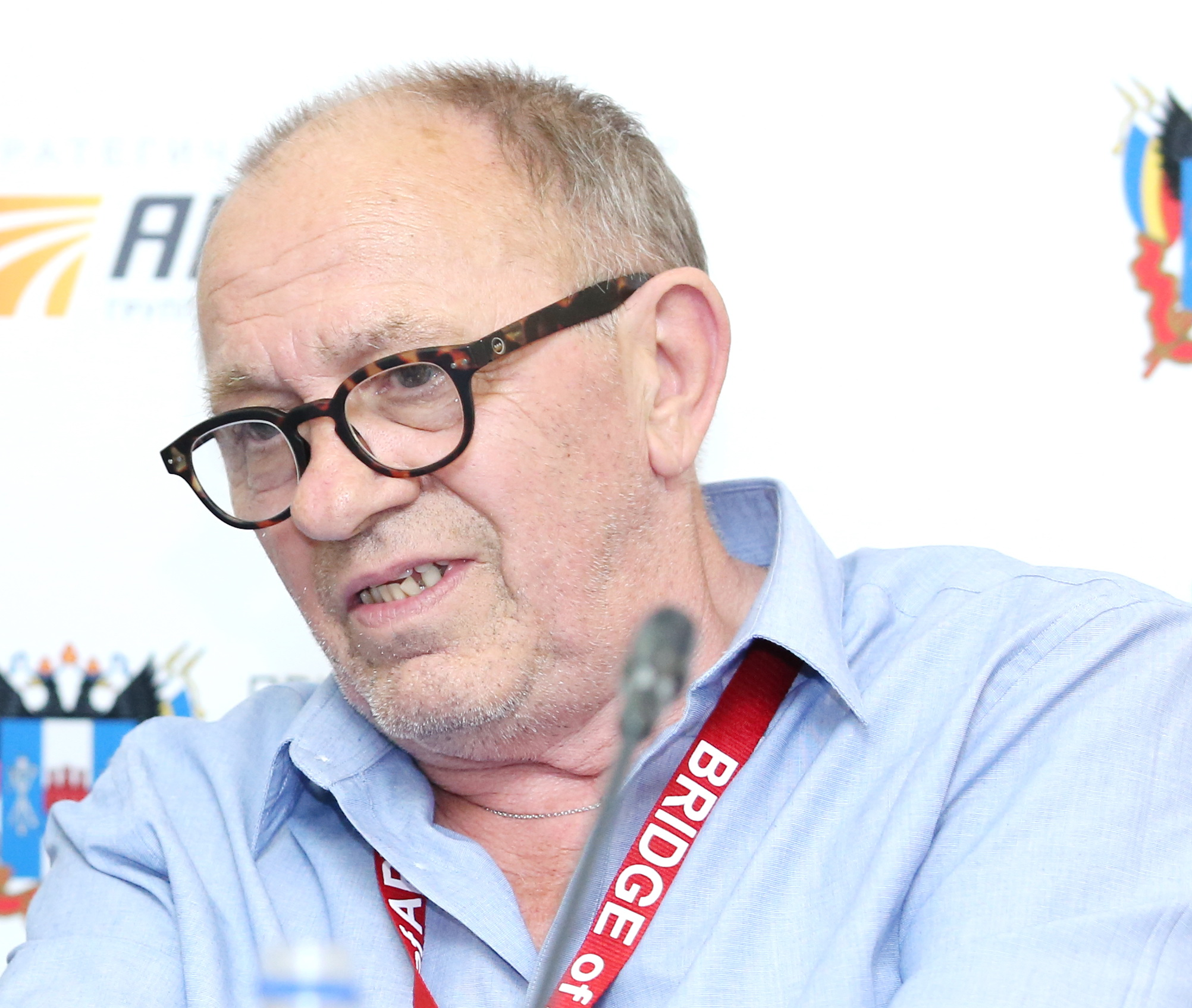
- Depardieu in 2016
- Born: 29 September 1945 (age 81); Châteauroux, France
- Citizenship: France
- Occupations: Executive producer Production manager
- Children: 2, including Delphine Depardieu
- Relatives: Gérard Depardieu (brother); Guillaume Depardieu (nephew); Julie Depardieu (niece)

Alain Depardieu, born in Châteauroux on 29 September 1945, is a French film production executive. He is the older brother of actor Gérard Depardieu.

== Biography ==
=== Early life ===
Alain Depardieu is the son of metal worker René Depardieu (1923–1988) and his wife Alice, née Marillier (1923–1988). He is the oldest of six siblings, including Gérard Depardieu. He described their early childhood as rather happy, before the family fell into severe poverty due to the birth of other children and their father's alcoholism.

=== Career ===
He began his professional life in architecture, but eventually discovered the film business in the early 1970s after his brother, who was gaining prominence as an actor at the time, invited him to visit film shoots. He then decided to change careers, first working with director Barbet Schroeder, then becoming assistant production manager on films directed by Claude Berri and Roman Polanski. He particularly credits the latter director with jump-starting his career in film production. He was employed on several films that starred his brother, including The Return of Martin Guerre (1982) though they stopped working together after Danton (1983).

Depardieu eventually became an executive producer and, during the 1990s, worked for Ciby 2000. In that capacity, he was notably involved in co-producing Jane Campion's The Piano, which won the Palme d'Or at the Cannes Film Festival. Three other films he worked on, Emir Kusturica's Underground, Mike Leigh's Secrets & Lies, and Abbas Kiarostami's Taste of Cherry, also won the Palme d'Or. He has also been active as a theatre producer and is involved with So Films Indépendants, a nonprofit organization supporting projects by young French filmmakers.

=== Personal life ===
Depardieu married in 1969, with a woman he had met through his brother. He is a widower. His daughter, Delphine Depardieu, is an actress, and his son is a film editor.

For a long time Depardieu was very close to his brother Gérard, but he says that he eventually moved away from him because Gérard unwittingly stifles people. He clarified in a 2015 interview that he and Gérard did not see each other but were not at odds, and that each kept himself informed of the other's activities.

In 2015, he published the book Mon frère (My Brother), about his younger brother and their relationship.

== Selected filmography ==
- 1975: Maîtresse, by Barbet Schroeder
- 1976: The Tenant, by Roman Polanski
- 1977: Armaguedon, by Alain Jessua
- 1977: Madame Rosa, by Moshé Mizrahi
- 1977: The Devil Probably, by Robert Bresson
- 1979: Tess, by Roman Polanski
- 1979: Écoute voir, by Hugo Santiago
- 1980: Je vous aime, by Claude Berri
- 1981: Men Prefer Fat Girls, by Jean-Marie Poiré
- 1981: Le Maître d'école, by Claude Berri
- 1981: Quartet, by James Ivory
- 1982: The Return of Martin Guerre, by Daniel Vigne
- 1982: Santa Claus Is a Stinker, by Jean-Marie Poiré
- 1983: Danton, by Andrzej Wajda
- 1983: My Best Friend's Girl, by Bertrand Blier
- 1983: So Long, Stooge by Claude Berri
- 1984: The Vengeance of the Winged Serpent, by Gérard Oury
- 1986: Pirates, by Roman Polanski
- 1989: Hiver 54, l'abbé Pierre, by Denis Amar
- 1991: Une époque formidable..., by Gérard Jugnot
- 1991: High Heels, by Pedro Almodovar
- 1993: The Piano, by Jane Campion
- 1993: Shadow of a Doubt, by Aline Issermann
- 1994: Through the Olive Trees, by Abbas Kiarostami
- 1995: Underground, by Emir Kusturica
- 1996: Fallait pas !..., by Gérard Jugnot
- 1996: Secrets & Lies, by Mike Leigh
- 1997: Taste of Cherry, by Abbas Kiarostami
- 2002: In the City Without Limits, by Antonio Hernández
- 2017: La Dormeuse Duval, by Manuel Sanchez

== Book ==
- Mon frère, Éditions de l'Archipel, 2015, 240 p., ISBN 2809816794
