= Delphine Depardieu =

French actress

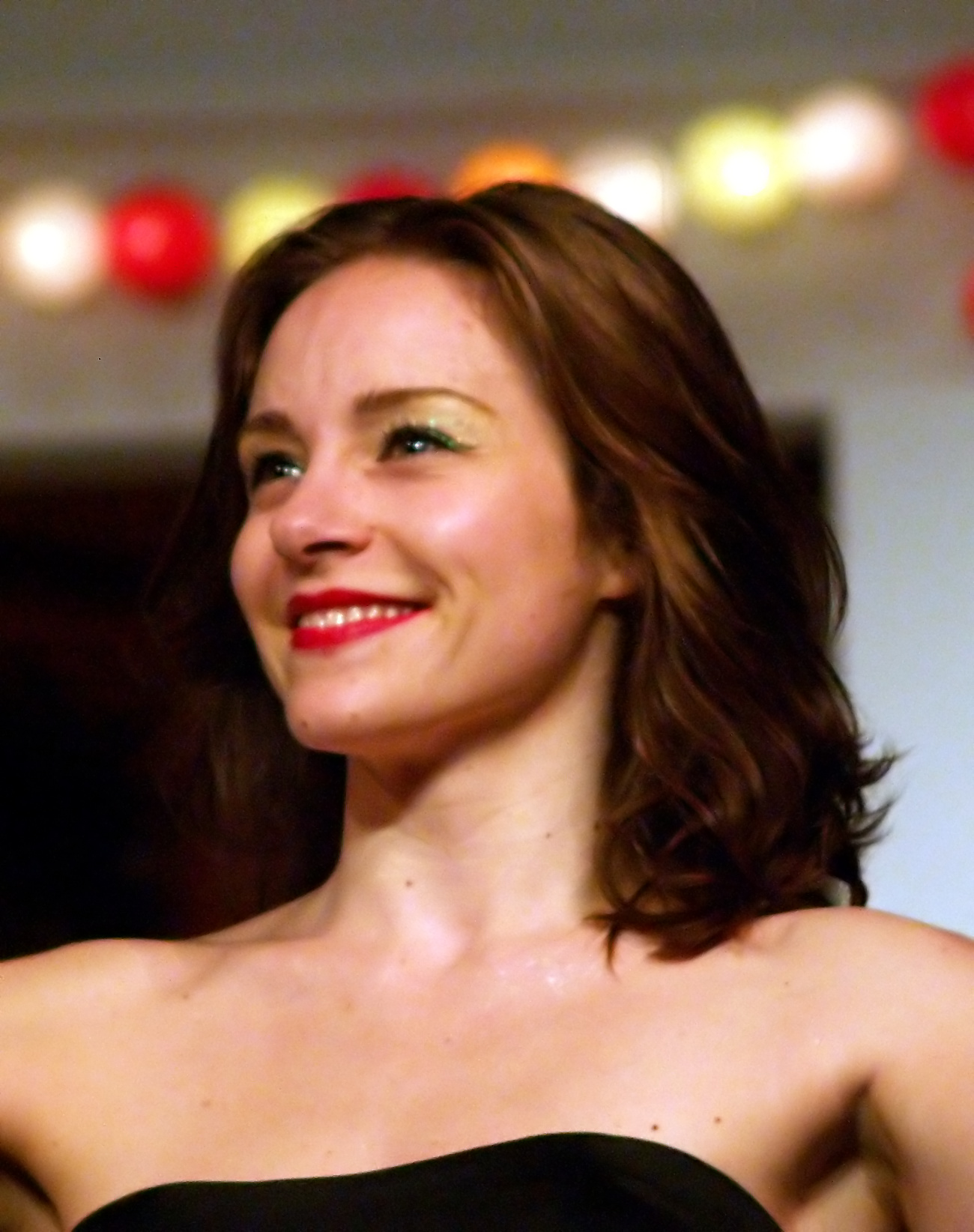
- Depardieu in 2012
- Born: 8 March 1979 (age 47); France
- Occupation: Actress
- Parent: Alain Depardieu
- Relatives: Gérard Depardieu (uncle); Élisabeth Depardieu (aunt by marriage); Guillaume Depardieu (cousin); Julie Depardieu (cousin)
- Awards: Molière Award for Best Actress (2025)

Delphine Depardieu (born 8 March 1979) is a French actress.

== Biography ==
She is the daughter of film executive Alain Depardieu, and the niece of actor Gérard Depardieu.

Following her training at the École internationale de création audiovisuelle et de réalisation (EICAR), at the Cours Simon and Jean-Laurent Cochet's course, she pursued a career in theatre and film. On stage, she has performed alongside Roland Giraud, Paul Belmondo and Alexandre Brasseur.

In 2025, she won the Molière Award for Best Actress in a Private Theater Show for her performance as the Marquise de Merteuil in a stage adaptation of Les Liaisons dangereuses.

== Filmography ==
=== Film ===
- 2006: Antonio Vivaldi, un prince à Venise directed by Jean-Louis Guillermou
- 2006: Lisa et le pilote d’avion directed by Philippe Barassat
- 2008: Asterix at the Olympic Games directed by Thomas Langmann
- 2009: Une affaire d'État directed by Éric Valette
- 2010: Streamfield, les carnets noirs directed by Jean-Luc Miesch
- 2011: Équinoxe directed by Laurent Carcélès
- 2014: Hasta mañana directed by Sébastien Maggiani and Olivier Vidal
- 2016: La Dormeuse Duval directed by Manuel Sanchez from the novel Les bottes rouges written by Franz Bartelt
- 2017: The Return, directed by Kastriot Abdyli
- 2021: Happy Night, directed by Mustafa Ozgun
- 2025: La Tournée, directed by Florian Hessique

=== Video clips ===
- 2008: Je monte la garde by Subway
- 2012: Chope la!, by PP Noc

=== Video recording of stage play ===
- 2011: De filles en aiguilles (Shady Business) by Robin Hawdon, French adaptation by Stewart Vaughan and Jean-Christophe Barc, directed by Jacques Décombe, filmed at the Théâtre de la Michodière Paris

=== Shorts ===
- 2004: Last game directed by Fred Bargain
- 2004: La Légende des Mille étangs directed by Alain Baptizet
- 2004: La musique adoucit les meurtres directed by Jean-Pierre Ybert and Eve Laudenback
- 2006: Jusqu'au noir directed by Jean-Benoit Souil
- 2012: Bonjour Madame Bonjour Monsieur directed by Mohamed Fekrane

=== Television ===
- 2003: Rose et Val directed by Stéphane Kappes
- 2005: Julie Lescaut - une affaire jugée -, directed by Daniel Janneau
- 2008: Duval et Moretti - César à deux doigts de la mort -, directed by Denis Amar
- 2014: Dame de feu, directed by Camille Bordes-Resnais and Alexis Lecaye
- 2023: Tandem, TV series (one episode)
- 2024: Astrid et Raphaëlle, TV series (one episode)

== Artistic director ==
- show: Naho, tellement folle!

== Theatre ==
- 2002: Chute de vie, directed by Jean-Benoit Souil, Salon d’honneur de l'Hôtel des Invalides Paris
- 2006: Délit de fuites by Jean-Claude Islert, directed by Jean-Luc Moreau, with Roland Giraud, Théâtre de la Michodière Paris
- 2008: Traitement de choc by Chris Orlandi, directed by Olivier Belmondo, Théâtre du Petit Gymnase Paris
- 2008: Jupe obligatoire by Nathalie Vierne, directed by Nathalie Vierne, Audience award at the Prix Raimu de la comédie (2009),
- 2009: Un oreiller ou trois, (Why Not Stay for Breakfast) by Ray Cooney and Gene Stone, (French adaptation by Stewart Vaughan and Jean-Claude Islert), directed by Olivier Belmondo, with Paul Belmondo, Théâtre des Nouveautés Paris
- 2009: Le Bug by Richard Strand, directed by Beata Nilska, Théâtre La Bruyère Paris
- 2010: Le Misanthrope ou l'Atrabilaire amoureux by Molière, directed by Nicolas Rigas, Théâtre du Petit Monde, Festival Off d'Avignon
- 2010: Aimer by Paul Géraldy, Espace La Comedia
- 2011: Ménage à trois by Roberto Traverso, directed by Marco Rampoldi, production Théâtre français de Milan, Teatro Franco Parenti
- 2011: Bouleversé(e), directed by Anouche Setbon and Bruno Banon, Théâtre de l'Atelier
- 2011: De filles en aiguilles (Shady Business) by Robin Hawdon, (French adaptation by Stewart Vaughan and Jean-Christophe Barc), directed by Jacques Décombe, Théâtre de la Michodière Paris
- 2012: Plus vraie que nature by Martial Courcier, directed by Raphaëlle Cambray, with Paul Belmondo and Jean Martinez, Comédie Bastille Paris
- 2013: Full of life from John Fante 's novel, with Bruno Conan and off-voices of Delphine Depardieu and Popeck
- 2014: La Pèlerine écossaise by Sacha Guitry, directed by Pierre Laville, Théâtre Daunou Paris
- 2015: La chanson des nuages by David Friszman, directed by David Friszman, Théâtre Au coin de la lune, Avignon
- 2015: Un Deux Trois... Soleil by Christelle George, directed by Michel Voletti, Théâtre Le Ranelagh, Paris
- 2016: Le dernier baiser de Mozart by Alain Teulié, directed by Raphaëlle Cambray, Théâtre Actuel Festival off d'Avignon and theatre Petit Montparnasse, Paris
- 2017: L'Aigle à deux têtes by Jean Cocteau, directed by Issame Chayle, Théâtre Le Ranelagh, Paris
- 2020 : The Taming of the Shrew by William Shakespeare, directed by Frédérique Lazarini, Artistic Athévains, Paris
- 2021 : The Importance of Being Earnest by Oscar Wilde, directed by Arnaud Denis, Théâtre Hébertot, Paris
- 2025: Les Liaisons Dangereuses, directed and adapted from Choderlos de Laclos's novel by Arnaud Denis, Comédie des Champs-Élysées, Paris
- 2026: The King's Speech by David Seidler, directed by Jérémie Lippmann, Gymnase Marie-Bell, Paris
- 2026: Le Schpountz by Marcel Pagnol, directed by herself and Arthur Cachia, Lucernaire, Paris

== Honors and awards ==
- 2014: nominated best actress in a supporting role at the Southampton International Film Festival for Hasta mañana directed by Sébastien Maggiani and Olivier Vidal
- Knight of the Order of Legion of Honour
- 2025: Molière Award for Best Actress in a Private Theater Show for Les Liaisons Dangereuses
