= Théâtre Le Ranelagh =

Theatre in Paris, France

Coordinates: 48.8546°N 2.2776°E

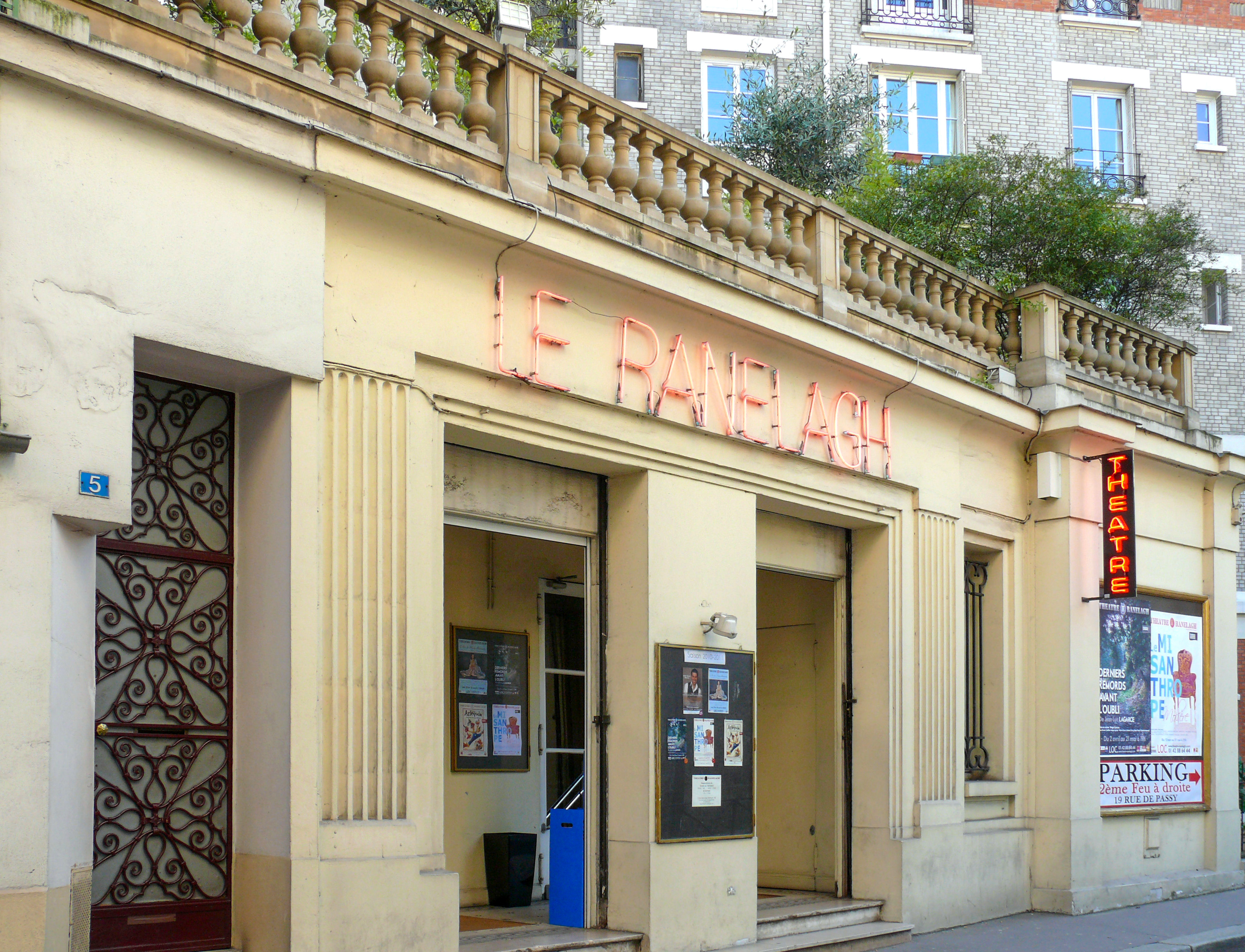
Théâtre Le Ranelagh in 2011

The Théâtre le Ranelagh (French pronunciation: [teɑtʁ lə ʁanlaɡ]) is a theater located at 5 rue des Vignes, in the 16th arrondissement of Paris, close to the Ranelagh Gardens.

== History ==
In 1755, Alexandre Jean Joseph Le Riche de La Pouplinière, a fermier général under Louis XV, constructed a theater at the entrance to his estate in Boulainvilliers. At the time the estate was on the outskirts of Paris, well outside city walls. As a frequent patron of the arts he would gather a group of artists and intellectuals around him. Some of those he patronized were Voltaire, Quentin de la Tour, Van Loo and Johann Wenzel Anton Stamitz. Despite Pouplinière's support of the arts, the theater on his estate was the least celebrated. Jean-François Marmontel said that the plays were rather unexceptional but not quite bad enough not to applaud. However, because the plays were often followed by a great dinner and attended by the most prominent thinkers in Paris, the evenings were well attended by noblemen, despite the mediocrity of the entertainment.

The estate was left intact during the French Revolution but in 1815 the gardens of the property were destroyed by the English. In 1826 the estate was sold to speculators who created a new neighborhood called "Boulainvilliers" out of the estate's grounds. The land was fragmented into numerous plots, one of which was bought by Louis Mors who built another theater in 1894 on the site of Poupliniére's old theater. Mors was a music enthusiast who encouraged the emergence of musical themes in the early nineteenth and twentieth centuries. The theater was inaugurated 25 April 1900 by Camille Chevillard with an 80 musician orchestra as well as by others such as Bizet, Terrasse, and Wagner who all performed there during its early years.

In 1931, the hall became a theater for artistic films, quickly becoming a cinematographic Mecca, frequented by personalities such as Gérard Philipe and Marcel Carné. The director of the cinema for 20 years, Madona Bouglione, developed musical programs, a weekend showing of a circus movie and a wide array of other programming.

In 1977 the hall and decoration were added to the list of Monuments Historique.

== Gallery ==
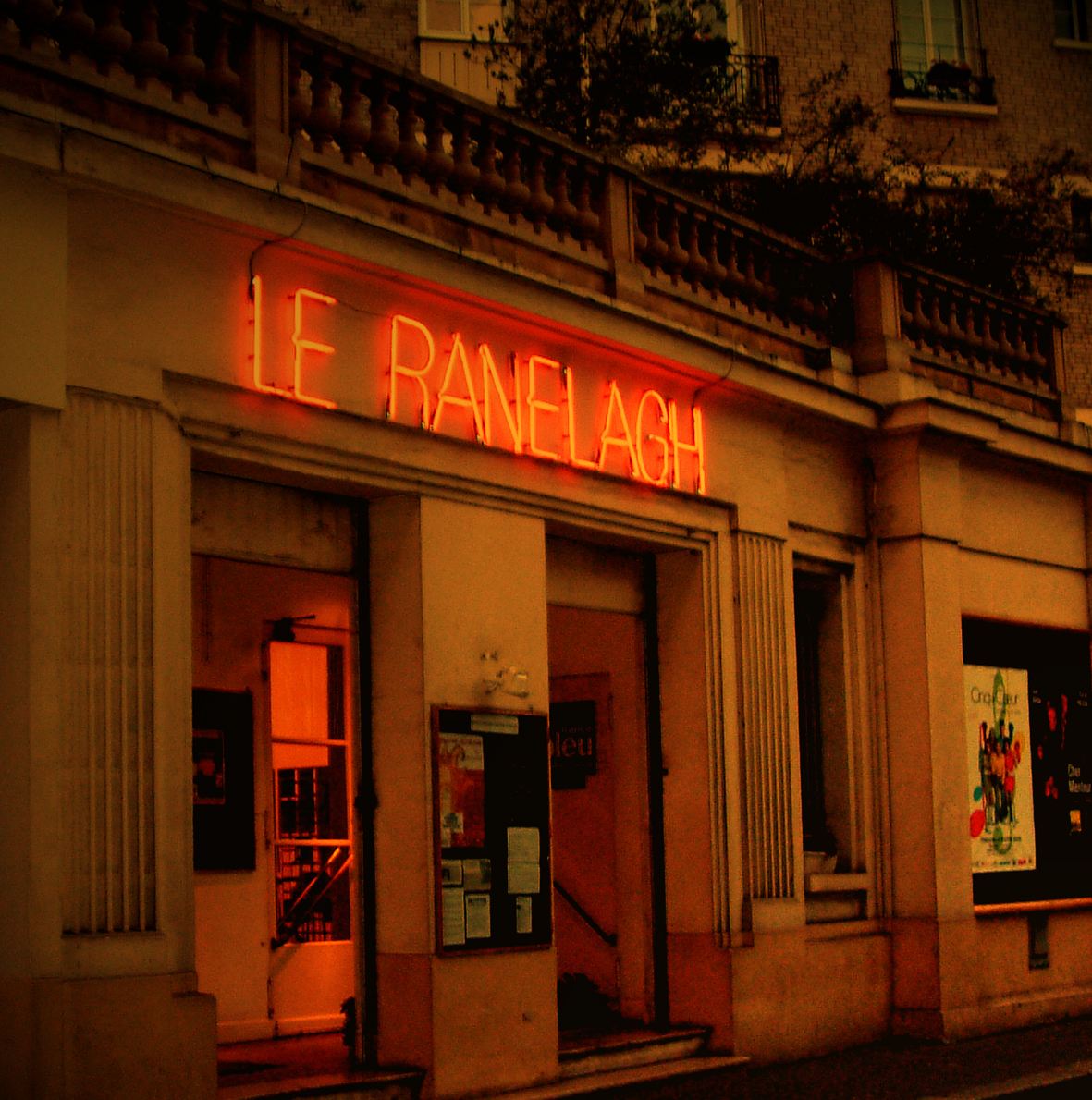
Exterior, rue des Vignes

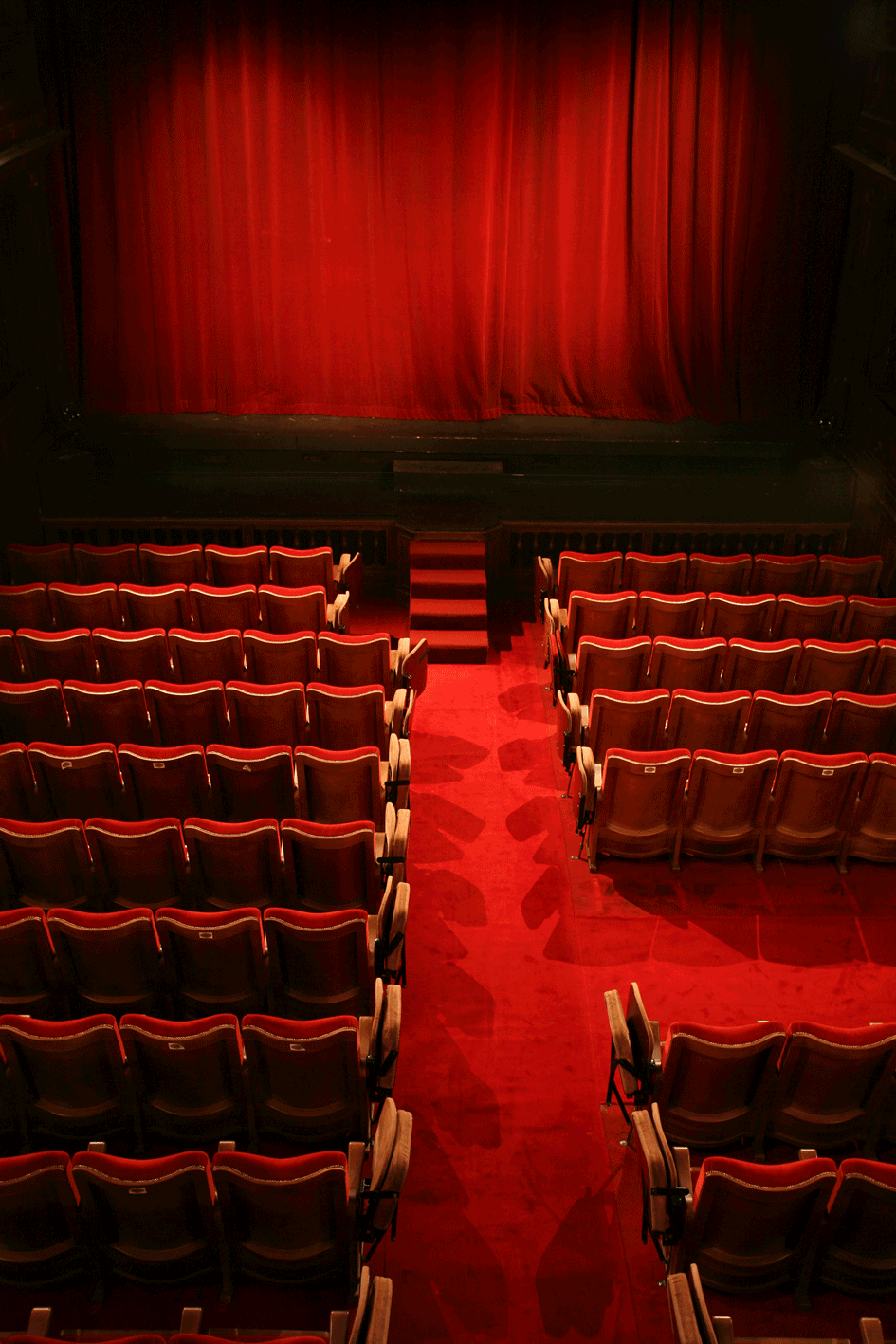
Stage curtain

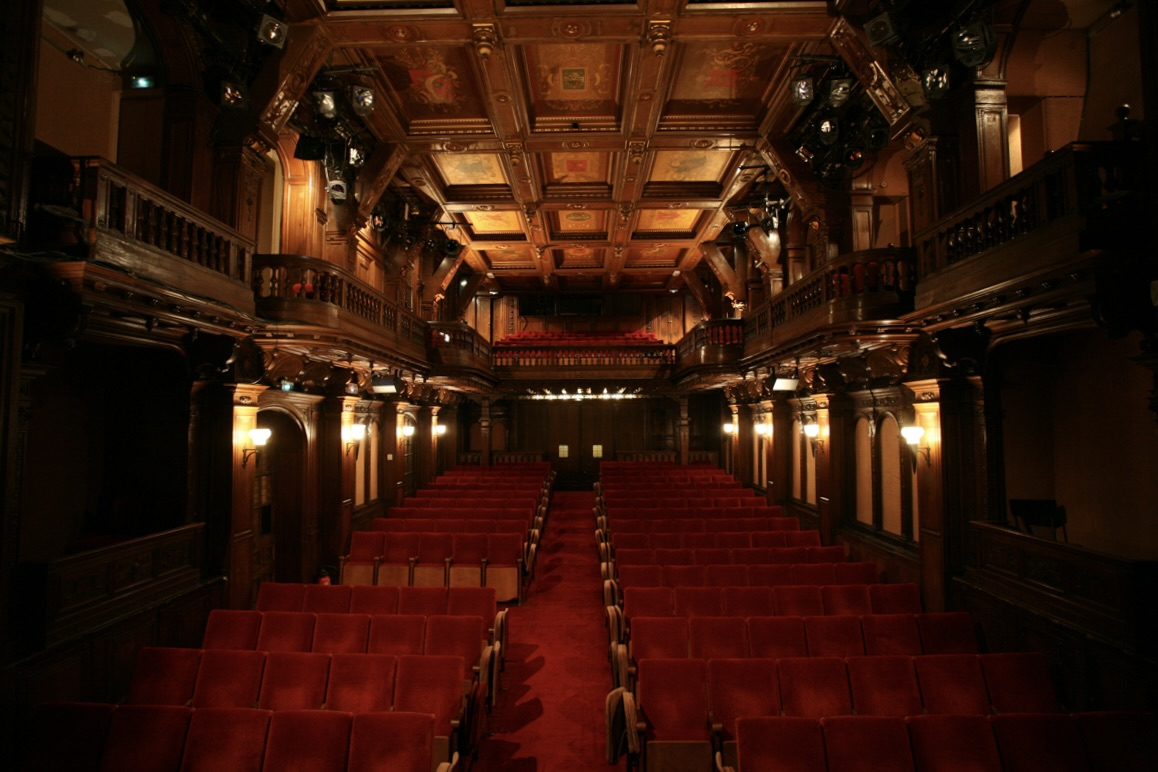
View of the hall from the stage

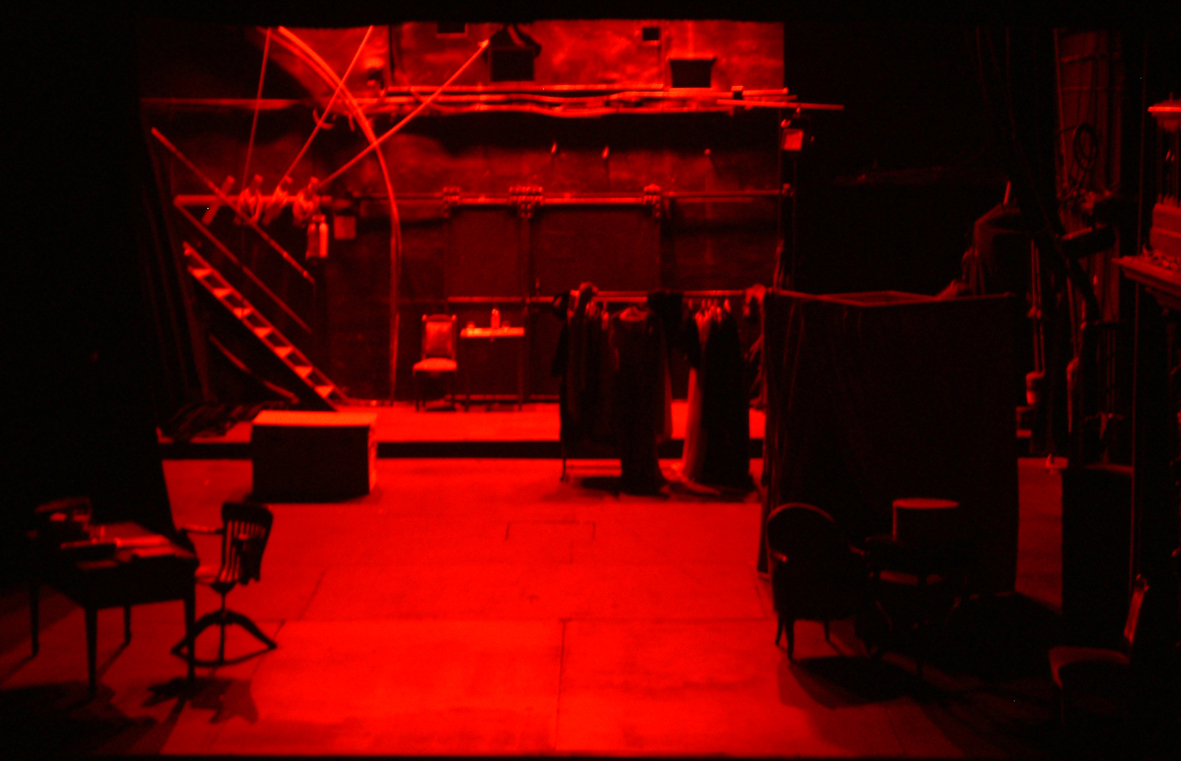
Backstage

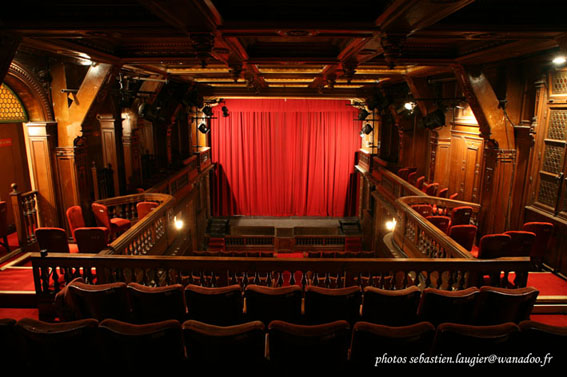
View from the balcony

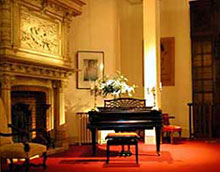
Foyer

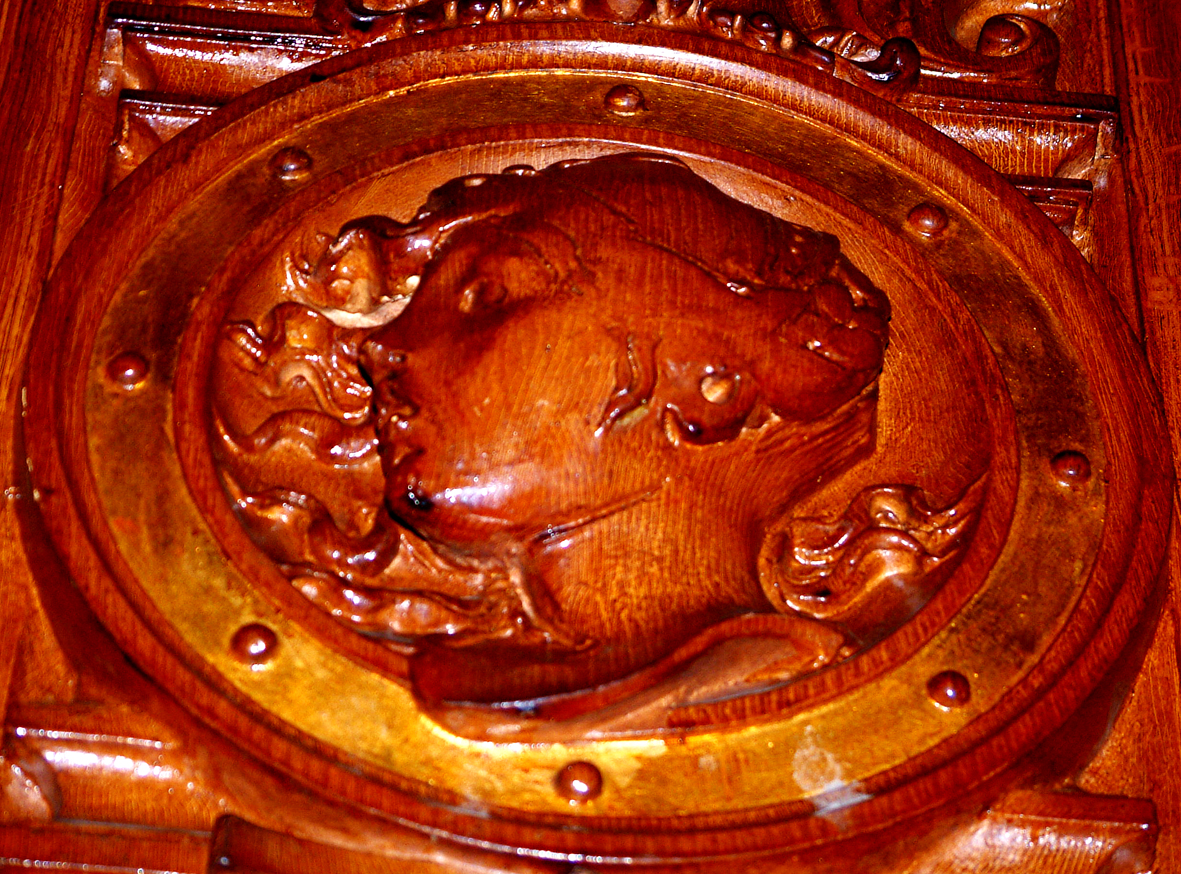
Detail of carving
