= Gérard Depardieu =

French actor (born 1948)

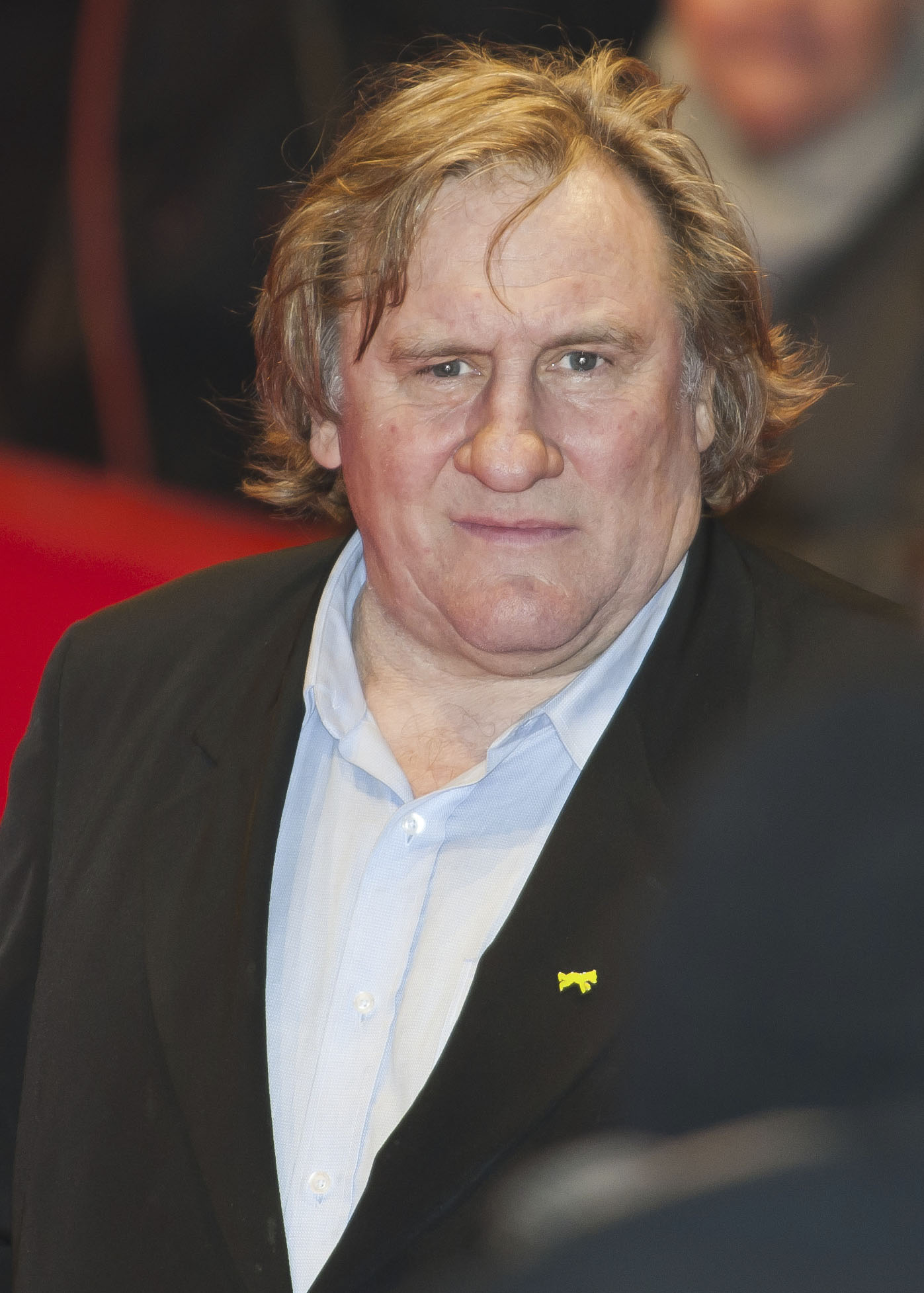
- Depardieu at the 2010 Berlin International Film Festival
- Born: Gérard Xavier Marcel Depardieu; 27 December 1948 (age 77); Châteauroux, France
- Other name: Жерар Ксавие Депардьё
- Citizenship: France; Russia; United Arab Emirates
- Occupation: Actor
- Years active: 1966–present
- Spouse: Élisabeth Depardieu (m. 1970; div. 2006)
- Partners: Karine Silla (1992–1996); Carole Bouquet (1996–2005); Hélène Bizot (2005–2006); Clémentine Igou (2006–2017); Magda Vavrusova (2017–present)
- Children: 4, including Guillaume Depardieu; Julie Depardieu
- Relatives: Alain Depardieu (brother); Delphine Depardieu (niece)
- Awards: Full list

Gérard Xavier Marcel Depardieu (UK: /ˈdɛpɑːrdjɜː, ˌdɛpɑːrˈdjɜː/, US: /ˌdeɪ-, -ˈdjʌ, -ˈd(j)uː/, French: [ʒeʁaʁ ɡzavje maʁsɛl dəpaʁdjø]; born 27 December 1948) is a French actor. Considered an icon of French cinema in the same way as Jean Gabin and Alain Delon, he has appeared in over 200 films since 1967, mostly in leading roles. Depardieu has worked with more than 150 film directors, including major filmmakers such as François Truffaut, Alain Resnais, Ridley Scott, Peter Weir and Bernardo Bertolucci. He is the second highest-grossing actor in the history of French cinema behind Louis de Funès, with roughly 60 of his films selling more than one million admissions in France. He has portrayed various well-known historical and fictitious figures, including Cyrano de Bergerac, Georges Danton, Christopher Columbus, Jean Valjean, Edmond Dantès and Porthos, as well as Obelix in four of the live action Asterix films. Beyond acting, Depardieu is a film producer, businessman and vineyard owner. He has occasionally directed films and performed as a singer. His body of work includes extensive television productions, several records and, as of 2025, 19 stage plays and 9 books.

Growing up in poverty in Châteauroux, central France, Depardieu experienced a difficult youth and was a juvenile delinquent before settling in Paris, where he became an actor. His breakthrough came in 1974 with the film Going Places, which propelled him to overnight stardom. He quickly established himself as a major figure in European cinema and demonstrated his versatility by appearing in a wide variety of films, spanning both mainstream and auteur productions. He has received acclaim for his performances in The Last Metro (1980), where he won the César Award for Best Actor, Danton (1983), Police (1985), for which he won the Volpi Cup for Best Actor, Jean de Florette (1986), and Cyrano de Bergerac (1990), where he won the Best Actor award at the Cannes Film Festival and his second César Award for Best Actor as well as garnering a nomination for the Academy Award for Best Actor. He started a Hollywood career with Green Card (1990), winning a Golden Globe Award for Best Actor, and later appeared in several high-budget English-language films, including 1492: Conquest of Paradise (1992), The Man in the Iron Mask (1998), and Life of Pi (2012).

Besides his acting accolades, Depardieu has garnered various honors, including appointments as a Chevalier of the Légion d'honneur and the Ordre national du Mérite. He was granted citizenship of Russia in January 2013. During the early 2010s, his tax exile in Russia and his support of Vladimir Putin caused controversy in France.

Depardieu was accused of sexual misconduct as early as the 1990s, though this did not develop into formal complaints until the late 2010s. In December 2020, French authorities charged him with rape. Depardieu denied any wrongdoing but a number of controversies, not limited to the accusations of rape, have since damaged his popularity in France and abroad. This resulted in several of his honors being rescinded in 2023, notably the National Order of Quebec. In May 2025, he was convicted of sexual assault against two women in a separate case. He appealed his sentencing, but withdrew his appeal and presented his apologies in November 2026.

== Early life ==
Gérard Xavier Marcel Depardieu was born on 27 December 1948 in Châteauroux, Indre, France, to a working-class family. He is the third of six children of Alice Jeanne Josèphe (née Marillier), a stay-at-home mother known as "La Lilette", and René Maxime Lionel Depardieu (better known in his neighborhood as "Dédé" because he could write only "DD"), a metal worker and volunteer fireman. Not wishing to have another child at the time, Depardieu's mother tried unsuccessfully to abort him. According to his older brother Alain, the family had a decent standard of living during the eldest children's early years, but fell into severe poverty after more siblings were born and their father developed alcohol problems.

Depardieu grew up in a two-room apartment at 39 rue du Maréchal-Joffre, Châteauroux, with his five siblings. His mother was not very affectionate, and sometimes violent to her children while his father, an untalkative introvert who struggled with alcohol addiction, was often absent from home. Depardieu helped his mother when she was in labor with his younger brothers and sisters. The family’s life was further disrupted by the fact that René’s mother and Alice's father were having an affair. Gérard’s childhood nickname was "Pétard" or "Pétarou", because of the habit he had acquired of breaking wind incessantly. Depardieu's parents were both born in 1923; Alice died of a heart attack in 1988; René, who suffered from cirrhosis, died two months after her.

Depardieu spent more time on the streets than in school, leaving at the age of 13. Practically illiterate and struggling with a stutter, he learned to read only later. In his 2014 autobiography, Ça s'est fait comme ça, Depardieu revealed that he had prostituted himself as a child, starting when he was 10 years old and could already pass as 15. He would sometimes rob his clients. He was later employed at a printworks, and took part in boxing matches in his spare time. He also supported himself by working as a beach attendant during summers.

During his difficult adolescence, Depardieu turned to theft and smuggling, selling goods like cigarettes and alcohol to the G.I.s at the large American air base of Châteauroux-Déols. He also acted as a bodyguard for two prostitutes who traveled down from Paris on the G.I.s' payday. Depardieu later credited those two women with teaching him about sex. In a 2005 interview, he stated that he was arrested multiple times and put on probation at one point, but never went to prison. He contradicted this in his 2014 autobiography, revealing that he had served three months for car theft at age 16. In 1968, Depardieu's childhood best friend and fellow Châteauroux hoodlum, Jacky Merveille, died in a car accident. This prompted Depardieu—who had relocated to Paris by that time—to reconsider his future and make something of his life.

== Career ==
=== Early roles and breakthrough ===
As a teenager, Depardieu befriended Michel Pilorgé, a slightly older boy from a more affluent background. In 1965, Pilorgé, whose family owned a flat in Paris and who planned to settle in the capital to pursue an acting career, invited Depardieu, then 16, to come along. Depardieu accepted and left Châteauroux for Paris. Out of curiosity, he began attending the acting class Pilorgé was taking at the Théâtre National Populaire. One day the teacher, Lucien Arnaud, noticed Depardieu and asked him to perform. The experience helped trigger Depardieu's vocation.

Depardieu next took acting classes with Jean-Laurent Cochet while making a living as a door-to-door salesman. To compensate for his lack of formal education, he studied the classics intensely. At Cochet's request, he underwent therapy with Alfred A. Tomatis to correct his disastrous diction. Depardieu later said that working on theatre texts had taught him to "read and speak".

2018 rear view of the Café de la Gare, a Paris theater where Depardieu performed early in his career.

Depardieu became the boyfriend, and later husband, of actress Élisabeth Guignot, whom he had met at Cochet's class. She introduced him to the Parisian bourgeoisie and entertainment circles, including directors Jacques Demy and Agnès Varda, whose child he occasionally babysat for spare change. He met Varda in 1966 when Guignot brought him on the first film project he worked on, Christmas Carole. Varda cast Depardieu as a beatnik, but the film was never completed due to a lack of funding and a distribution deal. In 1967, Depardieu made his first actual screen appearance in the short film Le Beatnik et le minet, directed by Roger Leenhardt; his diction was still so bad at the time that his voice had to be dubbed by another actor.

Depardieu's stage work also included performing in the type of small venues known in France as café-théâtres. This led him to appear regularly at the comedy theater Café de la Gare, where he met future onscreen co-stars Patrick Dewaere, Coluche, and Miou-Miou. He quickly earned a reputation for his "instinctive" approach to acting. His first feature film role was that of a thug in Michel Audiard's crime spoof Le Cri du cormoran, le soir au-dessus des jonques, released in 1971. That same year, Jean-Louis Livi became his agent and "mentor", introducing him to Artmedia, France's leading talent agency.

Around 1972, noted theatre director Claude Régy became enthusiastic about Depardieu, whom he found "extraordinary" and gifted in an "abnormal" way: he cast him in several plays, including Peter Handke's The Ride across Lake Constance, a production Depardieu later credited with jump-starting his career. Depardieu’s supporting role in the crime film Le Tueur (1972) impressed its veteran star, Jean Gabin, who imposed him on the directors of two subsequent films. Author Marguerite Duras cast him in two of her arthouse film projects, Nathalie Granger and Woman of Ganges (both shot in 1972). For his stage work, Depardieu received the Gérard Philipe Prize in 1973, awarded by the City of Paris to distinguish promising theatre performers.

In his early career, Depardieu was often cast as a hoodlum or petty criminal in supporting roles on film and television. He portrayed a similar figure in the film where he had his first major role, Bertrand Blier's raunchy and controversial comedy Les Valseuses (Going Places, 1974). Blier was initially reluctant about casting Depardieu, but the actor, who felt that the character's background strongly resembled his own, pestered him until he won the role. The film, in which Depardieu co-starred with Dewaere and Miou-Miou, was a huge box office success in France, gaining a cult following and making instant stars of the three actors. Depardieu and Blier subsequently had a long working relationship, making eight more films together.

=== Rise to stardom ===
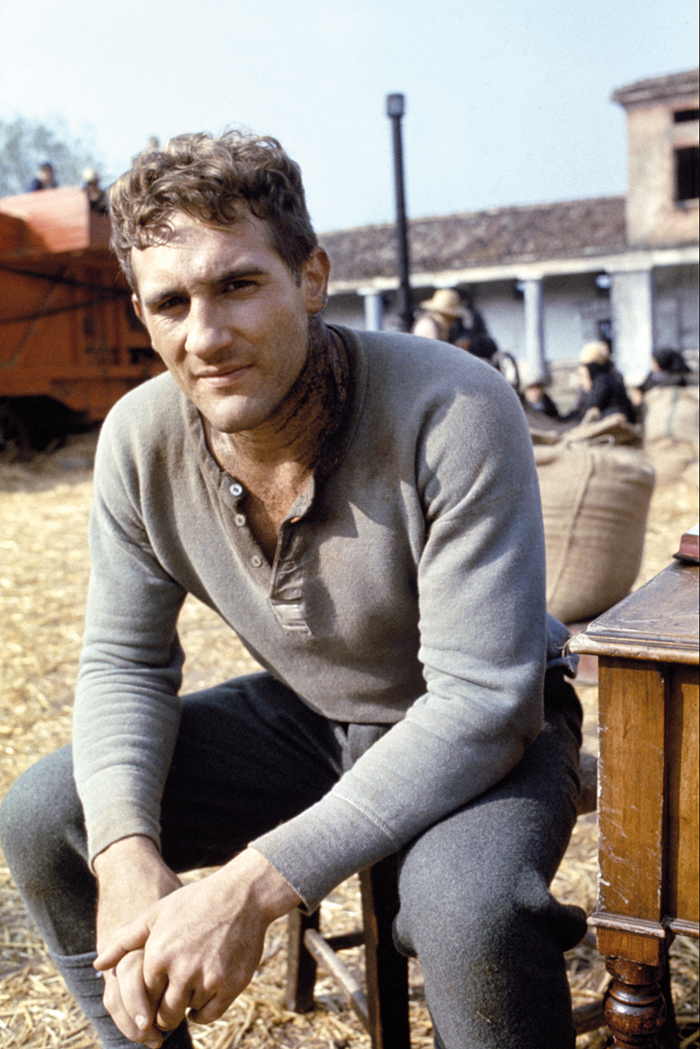
Depardieu in 1975 on the set of 1900

Depardieu followed his 1974 breakthrough by appearing during the same year in Claude Sautet's Vincent, François, Paul and the Others, alongside an ensemble cast of established actors, including Yves Montand, Michel Piccoli and Serge Reggiani. Also a box-office hit, the film became a classic of French cinema.

From the outset, Depardieu distinguished himself as an unusually prolific and versatile actor, starring in several films a year and alternating between mainstream productions and more demanding avant-garde films. His other prominent films during the 1970s included the psychological thriller 7 morts sur ordonnance (1975), which earned him his first nomination for the César Award for Best Actor. In 1976, he starred in Barbet Schroeder's controversial erotic drama Maîtresse, and in André Téchiné's romantic thriller Barocco where he co-starred with Isabelle Adjani. Also in 1976, Depardieu played a lead role alongside Robert De Niro in Bernardo Bertolucci's two-part Italian historical epic 1900, featuring an international ensemble cast that included Donald Sutherland, Stefania Sandrelli, Dominique Sanda, and Burt Lancaster. Although the film's five-hour length and Marxist-influenced content caused controversy upon release, it was later regarded as a classic.

While Claude Miller's thriller This Sweet Sickness (1977), where Depardieu starred as a deranged antihero, was a box-office disappointment, it nonetheless earned the actor another César Award nomination. During this period, Depardieu also appeared in several arthouse or experimental projects, including two films by Marco Ferreri, The Last Woman (1976) and Bye Bye Monkey (1978), and two by Marguerite Duras, The Lorry (1977) and Baxter, Vera Baxter (1978).

Depardieu reunited with Bertrand Blier and Patrick Dewaere on the quirky sex comedy Get Out Your Handkerchiefs (1978), which won the Academy Award for Best International Feature Film. The following year, he collaborated with Blier again on the surreal dark comedy Buffet froid (Cold Cuts, 1979), which later became a cult film in France.

=== Peak of success ===
==== 1980s ====
In 1980, Depardieu achieved widespread acclaim and commercial success across several prominent films. He starred in Alain Resnais's internationally successful My American Uncle and partnered with Isabelle Huppert in Loulou, a drama directed by Maurice Pialat. Though Depardieu's first working relationship with Pialat was difficult, the two later grew close and initiated a long-running collaboration, going on to make three more films together. He also starred alongside Catherine Deneuve in François Truffaut's The Last Metro, a romantic drama set in Nazi-occupied Paris. The film was a major box-office success and earned Depardieu his first César Award for Best Actor. Depardieu closed out 1980 by co-starring with Coluche in the box-office hit Inspector Blunder, a crime comedy in which he played the antagonist, and reuniting with Deneuve in Claude Berri's romance film Je vous aime. He subsequently formed a long professional partnership with Berri—who had also produced Inspector Blunder—and co-starred with Deneuve in six more films.

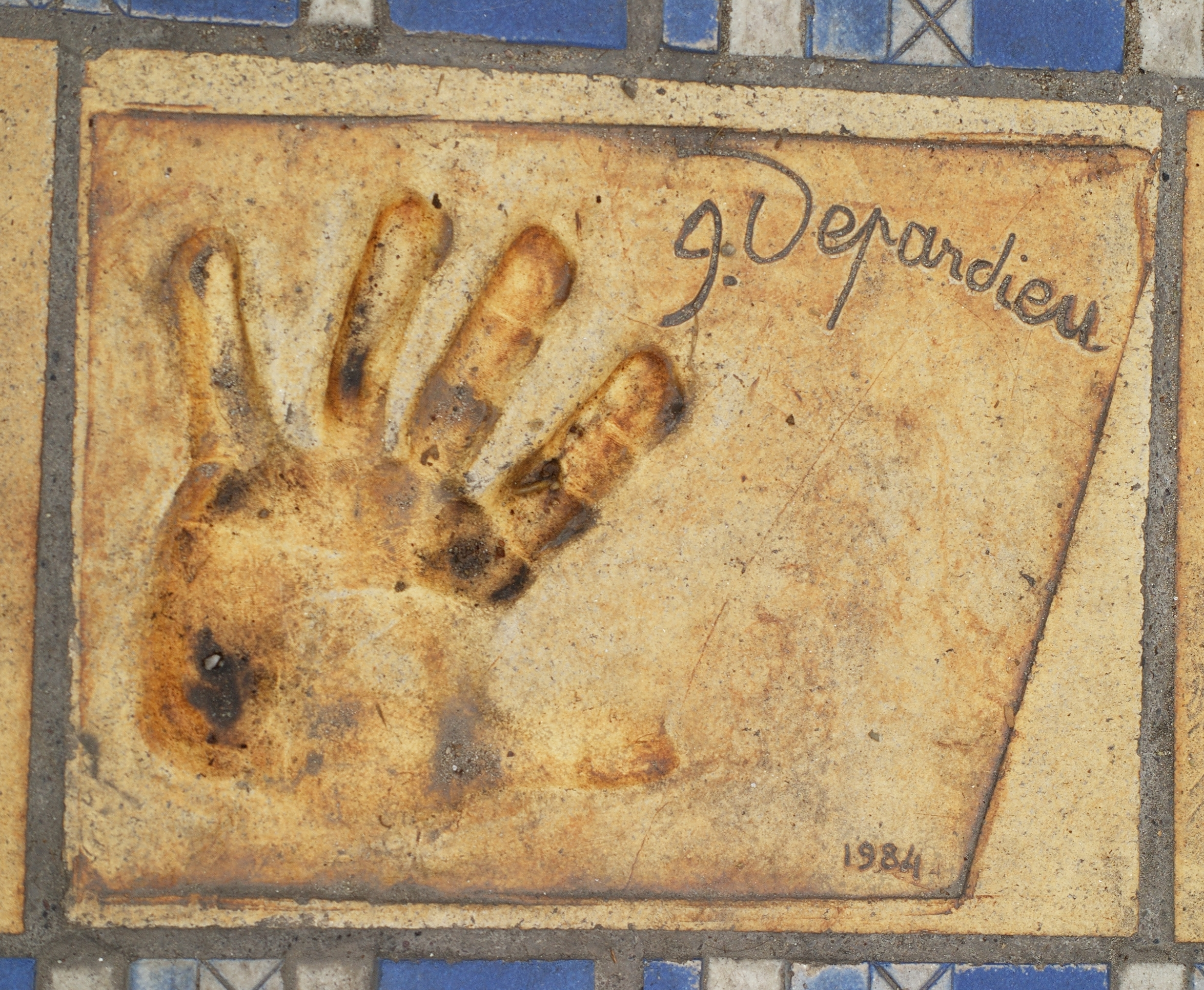
Handprint of Gérard Depardieu in front of the Palais des Festivals et des Congrès in Cannes, France.

That same year, Depardieu also tried his hand at singing and released several records—including a rock song he performed in Je vous aime—and an LP featuring lyrics written by his wife. Later in his career, he occasionally participated in musical projects. Nevertheless, he remained modest about his abilities as a singer, stating in 2017, "I don't know if I'm singing in tune. Plus, I don't give a fuck."

Throughout the early 1980s, Depardieu sustained a prolific run of critical and commercial hits, including his second and last film with François Truffaut, the romantic drama The Woman Next Door (1981) opposite Fanny Ardant. Other notable films included the period drama The Return of Martin Guerre (1982) alongside Nathalie Baye, and Andrzej Wajda's historical drama Danton (1983). During this era, he also starred in a pair of successful features directed by Alain Corneau, the crime film Choice of Arms (1981), where he played a violent gangster opposite Yves Montand and Catherine Deneuve, and the war drama Fort Saganne (1984), which reunited him once more with Deneuve and co-starred Sophie Marceau. One major disappointment during that period was Jean-Jacques Beineix's The Moon in the Gutter (1983); the film failed to meet box-office expectations and was later openly disparaged by the actor.

Also in 1984, Depardieu made his directorial debut with Le tartuffe, an adaptation of Molière's classic play in which he starred as the title character; Depardieu conceived it as a filmed version of the play, which he was performing at the time at the National Theatre of Strasbourg. The reception was disappointing for both the play and the film. Depardieu rarely returned to directing thereafter. He next reunited with Sophie Marceau in the crime drama Police (1985), his second film with Maurice Pialat. For his performance in that film, he was awarded the Volpi Cup for Best Actor at the Venice Film Festival. While this film marked Depardieu's reconciliation with Pialat, the actor had a tense relationship with Marceau, who later said that her co-star and the director had teamed up to torment her on the shoot.

Already an established dramatic performer, Depardieu extended his range and box office appeal throughout the 1980s by appearing in a series of highly successful, family-friendly comedies. Following Inspector Blunder in 1980, he co-starred with Pierre Richard in three buddy comedies directed by Francis Veber, La Chèvre (1981), Les Compères (1983) and Les Fugitifs (1986), that were major commercial hits in France. In these pairings, Depardieu played the straight man to Richard's bumbling characters. By the mid-1980s, Depardieu had cemented his status as one of the most bankable and sought-after stars in French cinema.

In 1985, Depardieu co-starred with Sigourney Weaver in the screwball comedy One Woman or Two, which failed to make an impact at the box office. In 1986, he worked again with Bertrand Blier in Evening Dress, a provocative comedy-drama about homosexuality that was remarkably successful in France, given the subject matter. That same year, his international profile rose significantly due to his performance as a doomed, hunchbacked farmer alongside Yves Montand and Daniel Auteuil in Claude Berri's period drama Jean de Florette — a film that won immense public and critical acclaim. Also in 1986, Depardieu ventured into musical theatre together with singer Barbara in a successful play she had conceived, Lily Passion. The next year, he played the lead role in Maurice Pialat's Under the Sun of Satan, which controversially won the Palme d'Or at the Cannes Film Festival.

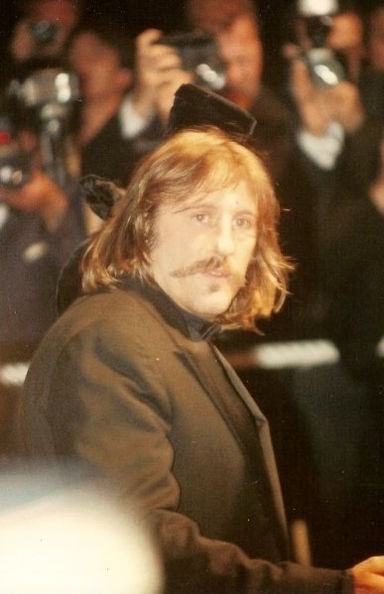
Depardieu at the 1989 Cannes Film Festival, sporting his Cyrano de Bergerac moustache.

In 1988, Depardieu portrayed Auguste Rodin opposite Isabelle Adjani in the successful and critically acclaimed biographical drama Camille Claudel. Several of Depardieu's next efforts were box-office disappointments, including François Dupeyron's A Strange Place to Meet co-starring Catherine Deneuve (1988) and Alain Resnais's I Want to Go Home (1989); however, he found renewed success in Bertrand Blier's Too Beautiful for You, which won the Grand prix at the 1989 Cannes Film Festival and the César Award for Best Film.

==== 1990s–2000s ====
In 1990, Depardieu received particular notice for his starring role in Jean-Paul Rappeneau's Cyrano de Bergerac, based on Edmond Rostand's 1897 play. The film was a major international box-office success and won critical acclaim: Depardieu's performance as Cyrano earned him his second César Award for Best Actor, the Cannes Film Festival Award for Best Actor, the London Film Critics' Circle Award for Actor of the Year, as well as a nomination for the Academy Award for Best Actor. Later that year, Depardieu appeared in the ensemble cast of Uranus, a satirical drama about postwar France directed by Claude Berri.

Depardieu's next film was the American romantic comedy Green Card, directed by Peter Weir and co-starring Andie MacDowell. As his first Hollywood picture, it was specifically conceived as a vehicle to introduce him to a wide English-speaking audience, with a role written to accommodate his limited command of the language. Released on the heels of Cyrano de Bergerac's success, that film allowed Depardieu to be briefly promoted in the American media as the next major cinematic export. Despite his good professional relationship with Weir, Depardieu remained unsure about wanting a Hollywood career and struggled to adapt to American customs and working methods.

Though Green Card performed moderately at the U.S. box office, it was an international success and earned Depardieu a Golden Globe Award for Best Actor. However, Depardieu's momentum was cut short when remarks he had made in a 1978 interview about raping women during his teenage years re-emerged in the American press. The resulting controversy damaged his nascent Hollywood career. The French media speculated that the backlash prevented him from winning the Academy Award for Cyrano de Bergerac. Director Jean-Paul Rappeneau later stated that the scandal had also cost Cyrano the Oscar for Best International Feature Film.

In 1991, Depardieu starred in two successful French films, the comedy My Father the Hero and Alain Corneau's critically acclaimed period drama Tous les Matins du Monde. In the latter film, he and his son Guillaume portrayed the same character at different ages. Depardieu next started filming Ridley Scott's historical epic 1492: Conquest of Paradise, in which he starred as Christopher Columbus. Released in 1992 to celebrate the 500th anniversary of Columbus' voyage, it flopped in the United States but performed well in Europe. While Scott later mentioned the film as one he was proud of, he acknowledged that Depardieu's accent in English had worked against it. Also in 1992, Depardieu was the Jury President for the Cannes film festival.

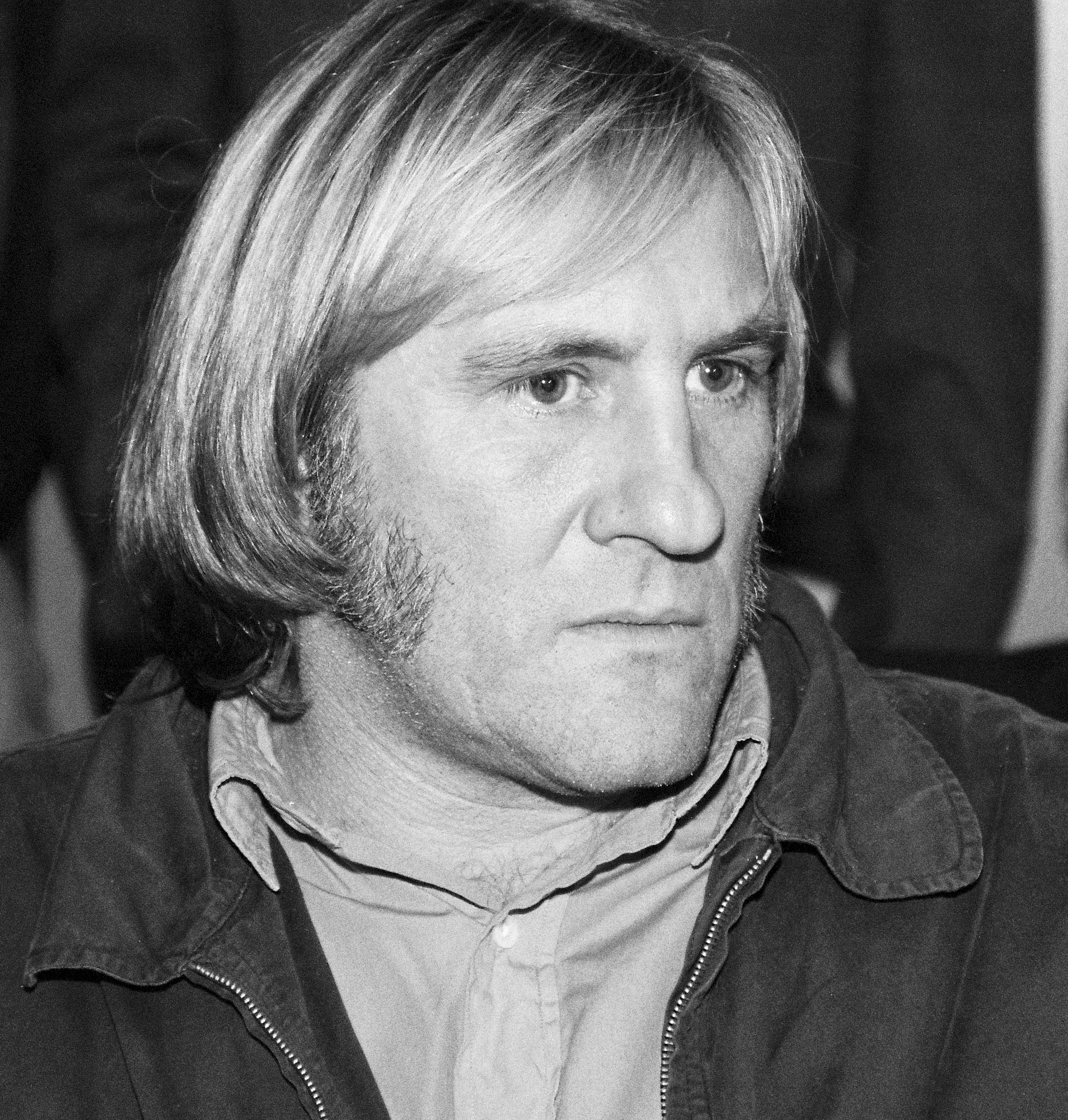
Depardieu in 1993, sporting his sideburns for the film Colonel Chabert

Depardieu also developed a passion for the films directed by John Cassavetes. In the early 1990s, together with Jean-Louis Livi, he bought the distribution rights for most of Cassavetes' films, including some that had never been released in France, to introduce them to a new audience. He later co-produced and appeared in Nick Cassavetes's first film as a director, Unhook the Stars (1996), and co-produced his next film, She's So Lovely (1997).

In 1993, Depardieu starred in Hélas pour moi, an experimental film directed by Jean-Luc Godard. However, Depardieu and Godard disliked working together; according to Godard, the actor left halfway through the shoot. Depardieu later refused to promote the film.

Depardieu maintained his commercial appeal in France with a string of box-office successes, including Claude Berri's epic period drama Germinal (1993) where he was part of an ensemble cast, Jean Becker's drama Élisa (1995) opposite Vanessa Paradis, Jean-Marie Poiré's comedy Guardian Angels (also 1995) alongside Christian Clavier, and the comedy The Best Job in the World (1996). By contrast, two films released in 1994, Giuseppe Tornatore's Italian-French production A Pure Formality and François Dupeyron's science fiction thriller The Machine, bombed at the French box office; Depardieu's performance in the latter film received unusually poor reviews. Other commercial and critical failures at the time were two comedies directed by Ariel Zeitoun: XXL (1997) and Bimboland (1998).

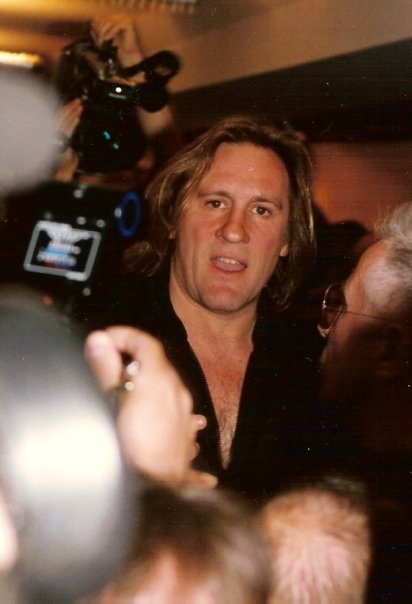
Depardieu at the 1994 Cannes Film Festival

In 1994, he starred opposite a young Katherine Heigl in Hollywood's remake of My Father the Hero, where he reprised the role he had played in the 1991 French original. His subsequent roles in major American productions included Bogus (1996) alongside Whoopi Goldberg , The Man in the Iron Mask (1998) starring Leonardo DiCaprio, and 102 Dalmatians (2000) with Glenn Close. Aside from these Hollywood features, his other English-language work during this period comprised a cameo in Kenneth Branagh's Hamlet (1996), the title role in the French-British historical drama Vatel (2000), and a supporting part in the independent film CQ (2001).

During the late 1990s and early 2000s, Depardieu appeared in several successful, high-budget European television miniseries; he notably starred as Edmond Dantès in The Count of Monte Cristo (1998) and as Jean Valjean in Les Misérables (2000). In 1999, following over a decade of absence from the theatre, he starred in the play Les Portes du ciel, written by noted intellectual and first-time playwright Jacques Attali. The production was successful with audiences despite a poor critical reception. Also in 1999, he made his second venture into directing with The Bridge, a romantic drama where he co-starred alongside his real-life partner Carole Bouquet. The film, which Depardieu co-directed with Frédéric Auburtin, was a commercial failure. Conversely, Depardieu enjoyed a major box-office success the same year by starring as the iconic French comic book character Obelix in Asterix and Obelix vs. Caesar, the first live action adaptation of the Asterix franchise. He reprised the role in three sequels, most notably Alain Chabat's Asterix & Obelix: Mission Cleopatra (2002), which became one of the highest-grossing films in French cinematic history. His other films during this era included Vidocq (2001), a digitally shot steampunk mystery that performed well at the box office but was panned by critics, as well as two successful comedies directed by Francis Veber, The Closet (2001) alongside Daniel Auteuil, and Ruby & Quentin (2003) co-starring Jean Reno.

=== Later work ===
==== 2000s–2010s ====
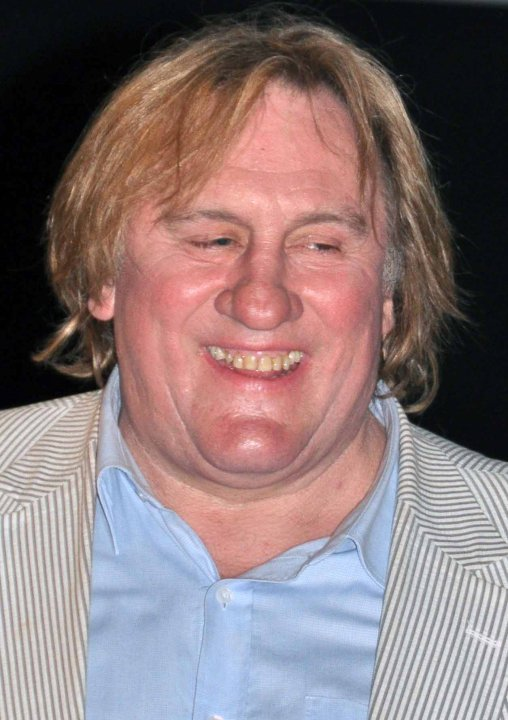
Depardieu in 2010 at a premiere of Mammuth

By the mid-2000s, though Depardieu remained prolific, many of the films he starred in were less successful internationally than before. He readily admitted that some were of poor quality. In 2004, the big-budget action comedy San-Antonio was a major box-office failure in France. Originally cast as the protagonist, Depardieu contributed to the production's troubles by being unable to lose weight for his role as planned, which caused him to be recast as the hero's overweight sidekick. Other films that underperformed in France at the time include Jean-Paul Rappeneau's Bon Voyage (2003) the comedy RRRrrrr!!! (2004), and Let’s Be Friends (2005).

Despite these setbacks, Depardieu enjoyed several commercial and critical successes during this period. Notable roles included the crime film The 36 (2004), where he played a villainous character opposite Daniel Auteuil, and the romantic drama When I Was a Singer (2006) alongside Cécile de France, a performance that won him the Lumière Award for Best Actor. He also starred in Claude Chabrol's last film, the murder mystery Bellamy (2009), and took on supporting parts in La Vie en Rose (2007) and Mesrine (2008). His rare English-language appearances at the time included a supporting role as a French chef alongside Queen Latifah in Last Holiday (2006) and his turn as a brutish antagonist in Ang Lee's Life of Pi (2012).

In 2010, Depardieu played starring roles in two successful films, the comedy Potiche alongside Catherine Deneuve, and the comedy drama My Afternoons with Margueritte. That same year, he portrayed the title author in the biographical film Dumas and starred in the surprise success Mammuth, a quirky, low-budget dramedy for which he had agreed to work at the union minimum wage in exchange for a percentage of the revenue.

Throughout the early 2010s, Depardieu's popularity in France suffered from the controversies following his tax exile first in Belgium then in Russia, and his public praise of Vladimir Putin. Several of his films performed disastrously at the French box office, including the period drama The Man Who Laughs (2012) which was released in the midst of the controversy.

Depardieu was next featured in several projects aimed at international markets, some of which were poorly received. In 2014, he appeared in two controversial productions that premiered at the 67th Cannes Film Festival. The first was Abel Ferrara's Welcome to New York, in which Depardieu starred in a thinly disguised portrayal of disgraced former IMF chief Dominique Strauss-Kahn; due to its subject matter, that film faced an industry boycott in France, which it bypassed by being released exclusively on VOD. The other was United Passions, a promotional film about the history of FIFA, which bombed at the box office and was lambasted by critics after its general release in the midst of the FIFA corruption scandal. During the same period, Depardieu co-directed and starred in La Voix des steppes, a French-Kazakh project that remains unreleased as of 2026. Also in 2014, the crime film Viktor, an English-language Russian production, flopped in its limited U.S. release, failed to secure a release in France and was ridiculed by several French media. That same year, Depardieu filmed scenes for the Italian-produced science fiction film Creators: The Past which sat unreleased until 2020, and then tanked at the box office in Italy where it later generated controversy due to its conspiracist content.

Later on, Depardieu made two films with director Guillaume Nicloux, the drama Valley of Love where he co-starred with Isabelle Huppert (2015), and the low-budget, VOD-released The End (2016). While neither was a box-office success, they marked a critical comeback for the actor, earning him nominations for the César Award for Best Actor (for the first film) and the Lumière Award for Best Actor (for both films). He went on to make two more films with Nicloux, including Thalasso (2019) where he co-starred with author Michel Houellebecq.

From 2016 to 2018, Depardieu played a starring role in Marseille, Netflix's first French-language original series. His well-received performances during that period included an extended cameo opposite Juliette Binoche in the final scene of Claire Denis's Let the Sunshine In (2017). Outside of acting, he published four books between 2014 and 2020, either to tell his life story or to express his personal philosophy. Starting in 2017, Depardieu performed Barbara's songs on stage as a homage to the late singer. He reprised this show several times in the following years. In 2019, he reunited with both Bertrand Blier and Christian Clavier for the film Heavy Duty, which met with a dismal commercial reception.

==== 2020s ====
Depardieu's next films included the drama Home Front (2020) and the critically acclaimed literary adaptation Lost Illusions (2021). In 2022, he appeared in starring roles in the successful comedy Retirement Home alongside Kev Adams, the mystery film Maigret, and the drama The Green Shutters. His public image was then severely impacted by allegations of rape and sexual assault. In April 2023, he was excluded from the promotion of his latest film, Umami. Later that year, his public performances of Barbara's songs were disrupted by feminists, causing the cancellation of several shows.

As a result of these allegations and the criminal charges brought against him, Depardieu was ostracised by most French filmmakers. In October 2023, he withdrew from the voice cast of the animated feature The Most Precious of Cargoes; his agent stated that he was "no longer accepting any projects in the current climate." In March 2025, while he was on trial, reports highlighted that he had not worked on a film set since the completion of The Green Shutters in 2021.

However, in May 2025, he began shooting a new project, Elle regardait sans plus rien voir, a Portuguese-funded production directed by his longtime friend and supporter Fanny Ardant. In 2026, he appeared as a guest star in the Algerian historical epic Ahmed Bey, a production that had been completed in 2018 but delayed in release. The film debuted exclusively in Algerian theaters.

== Artistry and public persona ==
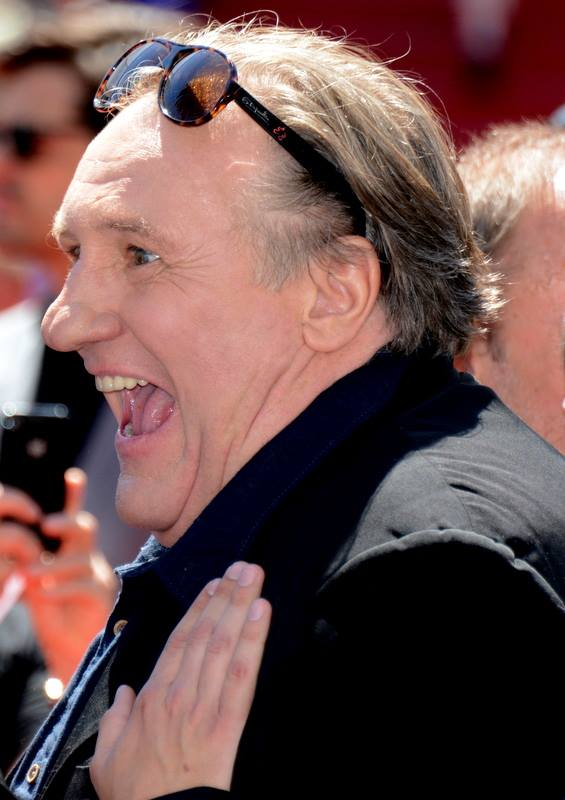
Depardieu at the 2015 Cannes Film Festival

Since his acting breakthrough, Depardieu has been noted for combining a brute physical presence with an ability to express a delicate emotional sensibility. This friction allowed him to navigate between different film genres and to play a wide variety of roles, including romantic lead and threatening antagonist. A 2021 article defined his acting style as "raw, tactile, and physically commanding" and "characterized by an outsized screen presence and deep emotional intensity". A 2013 piece in The Guardian commented that Depardieu "can certainly do humble, gentle giant, amoral, uncouth, even thuggish, but critics have always credited him with an underlying sensitivity and intelligence." His vast cinematic output, collaborations with major directors, number of awards, and box-office appeal allowed him to be recognized as a key figure — even a "monument" — of French cinema and contemporary culture.

Depardieu's physicality was always a core element of his star image. His hulking figure and his rugged, unconventional looks combined with his genuine blue-collar background to give him the aura of what the Los Angeles Times called a French "working-class hero". This appeal persisted even after Depardieu's considerable weight gain in later years: critics occasionally mentioned the actor's massive girth as a source of additional curiosity, and as an extension of his screen presence. A 2015 article in Screen analyzed the film Mammuth (2010) as built in part on the scrutiny of, and fascination with its star's "dramatically altered" and "bloated" body.

Depardieu in 2016, at a premiere of the film Tour de France

Despite widespread acclaim for his acting talent, Depardieu became in later years increasingly reluctant — or unable — to memorize his dialogue. He long used cue cards to address this; in 2004, while he was performing the play The Beast in the Jungle in Paris, it was reported that he was relying on an earpiece to deliver his lines. At the time, this was attributed to Depardieu's work overload, or to physical pain following a traffic accident. It sparked controversy in France, leading author Pierre Assouline to write in Le Monde that Depardieu was now less an actor than a businessman. From the 2010s, Depardieu openly used an earpiece on film sets. Director Bertrand Blier, a longtime collaborator of Depardieu, speculated that this was due to laziness on the part of the actor, but clarified that Depardieu otherwise remained professional and closely involved in preparing his scenes. Depardieu argued that it allowed his acting to remain spontaneous. In 2015, while promoting the film Valley of Love, he acknowledged having used an earpiece during the entire production, stating: "I don't want to memorize dialogues; it distorts the thought".

Depardieu's larger-than-life persona and "rumbustious screen presence" earned him a public image that The Guardian summed up as a "jolly Gallic giant". From the 2010s onward, however, his publicized alcohol issues, increasingly eccentric behavior, and tax exile gradually turned him into a polarizing figure in France. Several media outlets commented that over time the actor's filmography had become very uneven, and some of his performances uninspired. Depardieu's personal volatility was illustrated over the years by several erratic episodes, including a series of drunk driving accidents. In 2011, he was removed from a Cityjet flight to Dublin after refusing to sit down due to being refused access to the toilet, and urinating in a bottle. He apologized for the incident, which his fellow actor Édouard Baer attributed to prostate issues. In 2014, he was to attend a screening of Welcome to New York at the Edinburgh International Film Festival, but failed to turn up after an "enthusiastic visit" to an Isleornsay pub the previous night. Also in 2014, he appeared in Ixelles, Belgium to read texts during a World War I commemoration, but rambled incoherently while visibly drunk, which led to the event being interrupted. In 2024, in the midst of Depardieu's sexual misconduct controversy, Italian paparazzo Rino Barillari filed a complaint against the actor whom he accused of punching him in Rome. The matter was eventually settled out of court and the two men publicly reconciled in 2026.

For many years, Depardieu's prominent status in French mainstream culture kept the public tolerant of his excesses. Commenting on the French public's complex relationship with Depardieu, journalist Agnès Poirier said in 2022: "He is the best of us and he's the worst of us. He is France incarnate. As Cyrano and in other roles, he is the French persona, in all its glory and awfulness."

From 2023, however, the sexual abuse allegations against Depardieu and new publicity surrounding his personal behavior profoundly affected the public's perception of him, further hurting his popularity and precipitating what the media analyzed as a spectacular downfall and a moment of cultural reckoning for France in the MeToo era. In 2025, following Depardieu's conviction for sexual assault, Poirier wrote that while the actor's artistic legacy would endure, the knowledge of his behavior would make watching his films a "bittersweet experience".

== Personal life ==
=== Relationships and children ===
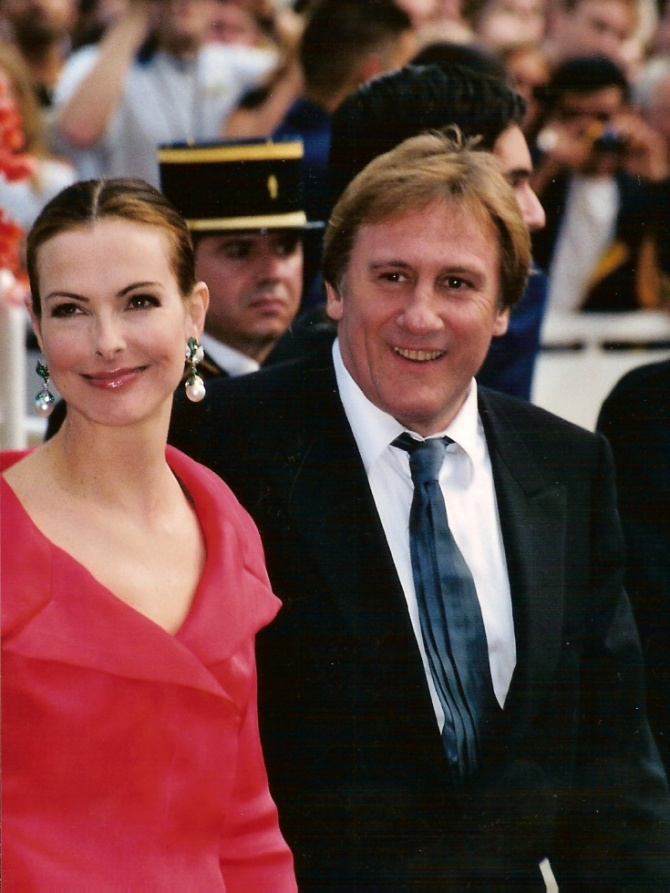
Depardieu with his partner Carole Bouquet at the 2001 Cannes Film Festival

In the late 1960s, Depardieu began a relationship with actress Élisabeth Guignot, later known professionally as Élisabeth Depardieu. They married in 1970 and had two children: Guillaume (1971–2008) and Julie (b. 1973), both of whom also became actors. The couple also appeared onscreen together several times, most notably in Jean de Florette where they played husband and wife. Although they separated in the early 1990s, their divorce was not finalized until 2006, following a lengthy court dispute.

As his marriage deteriorated, Depardieu met model Karine Silla (sister of producer Virginie Besson-Silla) and began a relationship with her. In 1992, while Depardieu was separated from Guignot, he and Silla had a daughter, Roxane. Silla remained Depardieu's partner until 1996. Also in 1996, Depardieu and his wife permanently separated following attempts at reconciliation.

From 1996 to 2005, Depardieu was in a relationship with actress Carole Bouquet. The pair were longtime friends before becoming a couple, having met on the set of the 1979 film Buffet froid and worked together on other projects, including Too Beautiful for You.

In 2002, during a temporary separation from Bouquet, Depardieu became involved with jewel designer Hélène Bizot (daughter of François Bizot, not to be confused with the actress of the same name). They resumed their relationship after Depardieu and Bouquet permanently separated. On 14 July 2006, Bizot had a son, Jean; the child was conceived as her union with Depardieu was ending. Depardieu eventually recognized his son in February 2008, following a paternity test. In May 2025, Bizot stated in an interview with gossip magazine Voici that Depardieu was planning to sell the apartment she occupied with their son, and that he intended to cut off her alimony even though she had no income.

For over a decade, Depardieu's partner was wine marketing executive Clémentine Igou, whom he met in 2004. Since 2017, he has been in a relationship with Czech film production manager Magda Vavrusova.

On 13 October 2008, Depardieu's son Guillaume died from pneumonia at the age of 37. Guillaume's health had been adversely affected by drug addiction, and by a 1995 motorcycle crash that eventually required the amputation of his right leg in 2003. Depardieu and Guillaume had a turbulent relationship, including a public falling out in 2003, but had reconciled prior to Guillaume's death. In 2002, they starred together in A Loving Father, a film that depicted a dysfunctional father-and-son relationship. In his 2014 autobiography, Depardieu acknowledged his shortcomings as a father, saying that he had been unable to provide an answer to Guillaume's suffering. Later, he blamed his son's death on the prison sentence Guillaume had received at the age of 17 for drug offenses: he said that Guillaume had never recovered from the experience and had been unfairly treated by the court due to being his son. Depardieu commented that his son had been "killed" for two grams of heroin.

=== Health ===
According to Depardieu's account, a doctor complimented him in his youth on his exceptional physical constitution, telling him he could expect to live to be 120. By his own admission, however, the actor combined this with an unhealthy lifestyle.

Depardieu was always noted for his excessive drinking. According to his friend Marc Esposito, around the early 1980s he also developed a habit of snorting heroin, which he eventually overcame. A 2024 biography reported that Depardieu's already heavy drinking worsened after his son Guillaume died in 2008. In 2014, Depardieu stated that he drank up to 14 bottles of alcohol daily; he would start at 10:00 a.m. with champagne, wine, and pastis, and end the day with vodka, whisky, or both. He remarked: "I'm never totally drunk, just a bit of a pain in the ass."

This severe alcohol consumption resulted in numerous road incidents over the decades. In 1998, Depardieu had a motorcycle accident with a high blood alcohol content of 2.5 g/L on the way to the shooting of Asterix and Obelix vs. Caesar. He was prescribed forty days off work. In 2012, Depardieu was hit by a car while riding his scooter in Paris. The same year, while intoxicated with 1.8 g/L of alcohol in his blood, he had another scooter accident, without injury and without collision with another party. A 2013 biography reported that he had been involved in at least seven motorcycle or scooter accidents since the 2000s.

In addition to his alcohol misuse, Depardieu has become known for eating in large quantities — something he readily admits. In 2015, Laurent Audiot, chef of the Parisian restaurant La Fontaine Gaillon, compared Depardieu to the gluttonous giant Gargantua, saying that "he has excessive energy and he compensates with food, but sometimes it takes on incredible proportions".

Depardieu's drinking and eating habits eventually caused noticeable weight gain from the 1990s onward. He managed several times to lose the weight through strict diets, only to regain it later. In 2000, he underwent heart bypass surgery after two weeks of chest pains. Throughout the 2000s Depardieu became permanently, then severely overweight. In 2008, he was reported to have reached 150 kilograms (330 lb). In a 2014 film review, The Hollywood Reporter called Depardieu "morbidly obese".

In the context of Depardieu's 2025 trial, it was mentioned by his legal team that he suffered from heart ailments and diabetes.

=== Tax exile and citizenship ===
In 2012, after French President François Hollande introduced a plan to tax high incomes at 75%, Depardieu registered as a resident of Néchin, Belgium in a tax avoidance move. French Prime Minister Jean-Marc Ayrault criticised Depardieu's move as "shabby" and unpatriotic. On 15 December, Depardieu responded by calling Ayrault's remarks insulting, and by stating that in the eyes of the French government, "success, creation, talent, anything different, must be punished"; he also said that he planned to hand back his French passport.

On 20 December, Russian President Vladimir Putin offered Depardieu citizenship, which the actor accepted. On 3 January 2013, the Kremlin leader signed an Executive Order officially granting it. Depardieu's officially adopted name in Russian became Жерар Ксавие Депардьё (romanized as Zherar Ksavie Depardyo). Two days later, Depardieu met with Putin at the latter's residence in Sochi, to receive his Russian passport. The resulting controversy harmed Depardieu's public image in France.

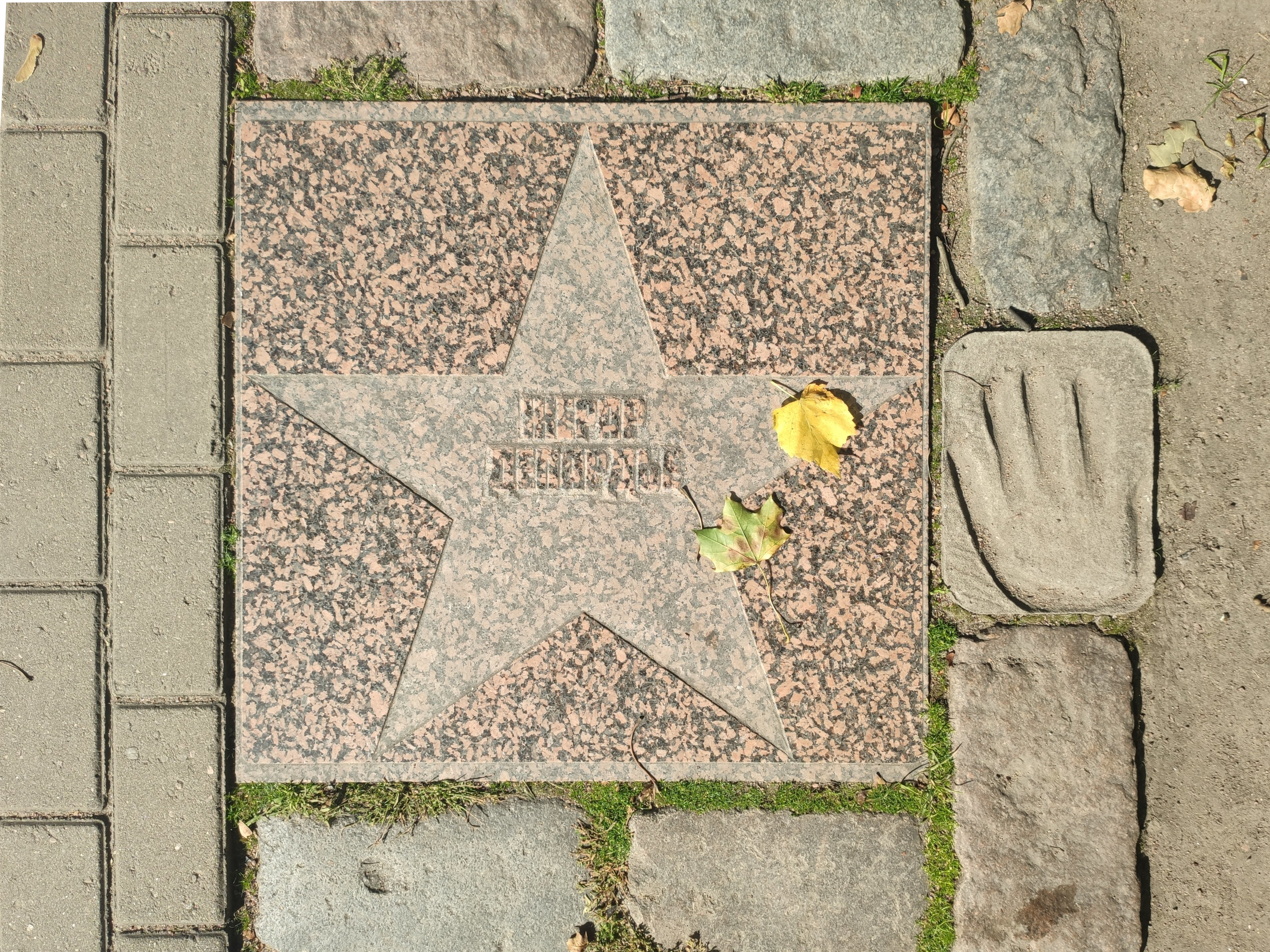
Star of Depardieu on the Actors' Walk of Fame in Vyborg, Russia

Also in January 2013, Depardieu was appointed a cultural ambassador for Montenegro, a country where he had similarly considered becoming a tax resident, or obtaining a passport. This caused some backlash in Montenegro, where several intellectuals penned an op-ed arguing that Depardieu had no connection to the country and that his appointment was a mere public relations stunt on the part of the Montenegrin government.

Depardieu registered as a resident of Saransk, Russia. There, he received a preferential tax treatment, becoming subject to a 6% rate, half as high as that paid by most other Russian fiscal residents. In 2018, he stated that he wished to become a citizen of Turkey.

In 2022, Depardieu revealed in an interview that he had become a citizen of the United Arab Emirates, although he did not specify when this occurred. In the same interview, he said that he had retained his French passport, even though he wished to live "less and less" in France. Depardieu's friend Guy Roux said that the actor's resentment of France stemmed from the 2008 death of his son Guillaume, which he blamed on the French judiciary.

While residing in Russia for part of the year, Depardieu remained registered as a resident of Néchin. In 2025, it was reported that the French National Financial Prosecutor's office had opened an investigation into aggravated tax evasion and money laundering pertaining to Depardieu's tax residence in Belgium. Magistrates aimed to establish whether Depardieu really had been living in Néchin, or if he had instead been staying in France for a period longer than that allowed by his status as a tax resident abroad.

=== Political views ===
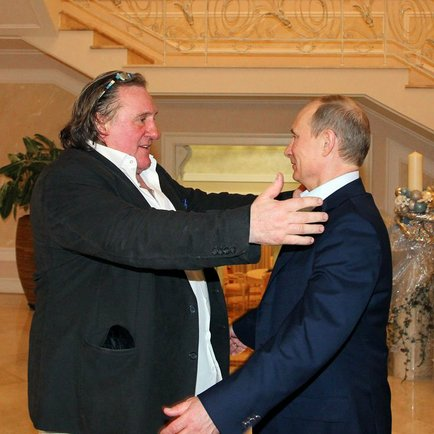
Depardieu with Vladimir Putin in Sochi, Russia, 5 January 2013

In 1987, Depardieu published an op-ed in the left-wing newspaper Libération in support of socialist French President François Mitterrand, announcing that he would be "voting for the first time" on the occasion of Mitterrand's 1988 reelection bid. He later said that he had abstained that year. In 1993, he expressed support for the French Communist Party. Later on, he supported conservative President Jacques Chirac. Following the 2002 presidential election, he again supported the Communist Party, then on the verge of bankruptcy after its electoral failure, by donating €10,000. In 2010, he said that right-wing President Nicolas Sarkozy was the only politician he appreciated. In 2012, during Sarkozy's unsuccessful bid for reelection, Depardieu publicly endorsed him and spoke at one of his rallies. He later said that he had been "drunk" that day.

Since the 1990s, Depardieu has publicly associated himself with authoritarian leaders, based on his economic interests. During that decade, while investing in an oil exploration project in Cuba, he met then-President Fidel Castro and expressed his sympathy for him. In 1998, he supported Slovak Prime Minister Vladimír Mečiar's bid for reelection. It was later revealed that Depardieu had been paid €45,000 for his endorsement of Mečiar, which he acknowledged in 2004. Depardieu eventually said he had realised afterwards that Mečiar was "a real fascist". Depardieu also expressed support for Algerian President Abdelaziz Bouteflika after investing in vineyards in Algeria. His associations with political strongmen were long tolerated by the French general public.

One day after being granted Russian citizenship by Vladimir Putin, Depardieu penned an open letter to the Russian President, praising him and calling Russia "a great democracy". His support for Putin was widely condemned in France by a broad spectrum of political actors, and the open letter drew ridicule from the Russian opposition. Depardieu granted his first extensive interview after becoming a Russian national to the state-owned news channel Russia-24, where he dismissed Putin's opponents, stating, "The Russian opposition has no programme; it has nothing". In his autobiography, he commented that Putin "immediately liked [his] hooligan side." Depardieu subsequently made public appearances with Putin's allies, Chechen leader Ramzan Kadyrov and Belarusian President Alexander Lukashenko, expressing his support for them. In August 2015, Depardieu's films were banned from television and cinemas in Ukraine after he said "I love Russia and Ukraine, which is part of Russia". Following his acquisition of Russian citizenship, Depardieu also expressed anti-American sentiment: in 2015, while in Moscow where he was performing a play, he called the United States "a people who have constantly destroyed others".

One of Depardieu's biographers, Bernard Violet, stated that the actor's fascination with dictators stemmed in part from his interest in extraordinary characters, whom he saw as "shakespearean monsters", and also from his taste for provocation. Another biographer, Lionel Duroy, said that Depardieu had no understanding of politics and was totally naive in this area.

In a 2021 interview, Depardieu said that he disliked dictators, had never met one, and did not consider Putin to be one. In March 2022, following the Russian invasion of Ukraine and while keeping his Russian passport and tax residency, he distanced himself from Putin, condemning the military action and accusing the Russian President of "crazy, unacceptable excesses". State Duma member Biysultan Khamzaev called for Depardieu's Russian passport to be rescinded and his Russian estates confiscated; the Russian government responded to the actor’s statements by commenting that Depardieu was probably ill-informed, and offering to explain the situation to him.

=== Religion ===
Though not baptized at birth, Depardieu had a Catholic upbringing. In the 2010s, he revealed that as a young man, he had converted to Islam as part of his interest in spirituality. Depardieu credited an Umm Kulthum concert that he attended in Paris in 1965 with starting his interest in Islam. According to Depardieu, this conversion took place in the late 1960s, though he also said in some interviews that it had occurred during the 1970s. He "was a Muslim for two years" before giving up due to his inability to learn Arabic. He later expressed interests in Buddhism and Hinduism.

In 2003, following an encounter with Pope John Paul II, Depardieu gave public readings of Saint Augustine's Confessions at the Notre-Dame Cathedral. Over the years, he gave several other readings of Saint Augustine's works. In September 2020, Depardieu converted to Eastern Orthodox Christianity at the Alexander Nevsky Cathedral in Paris.

=== Business ventures and wealth ===
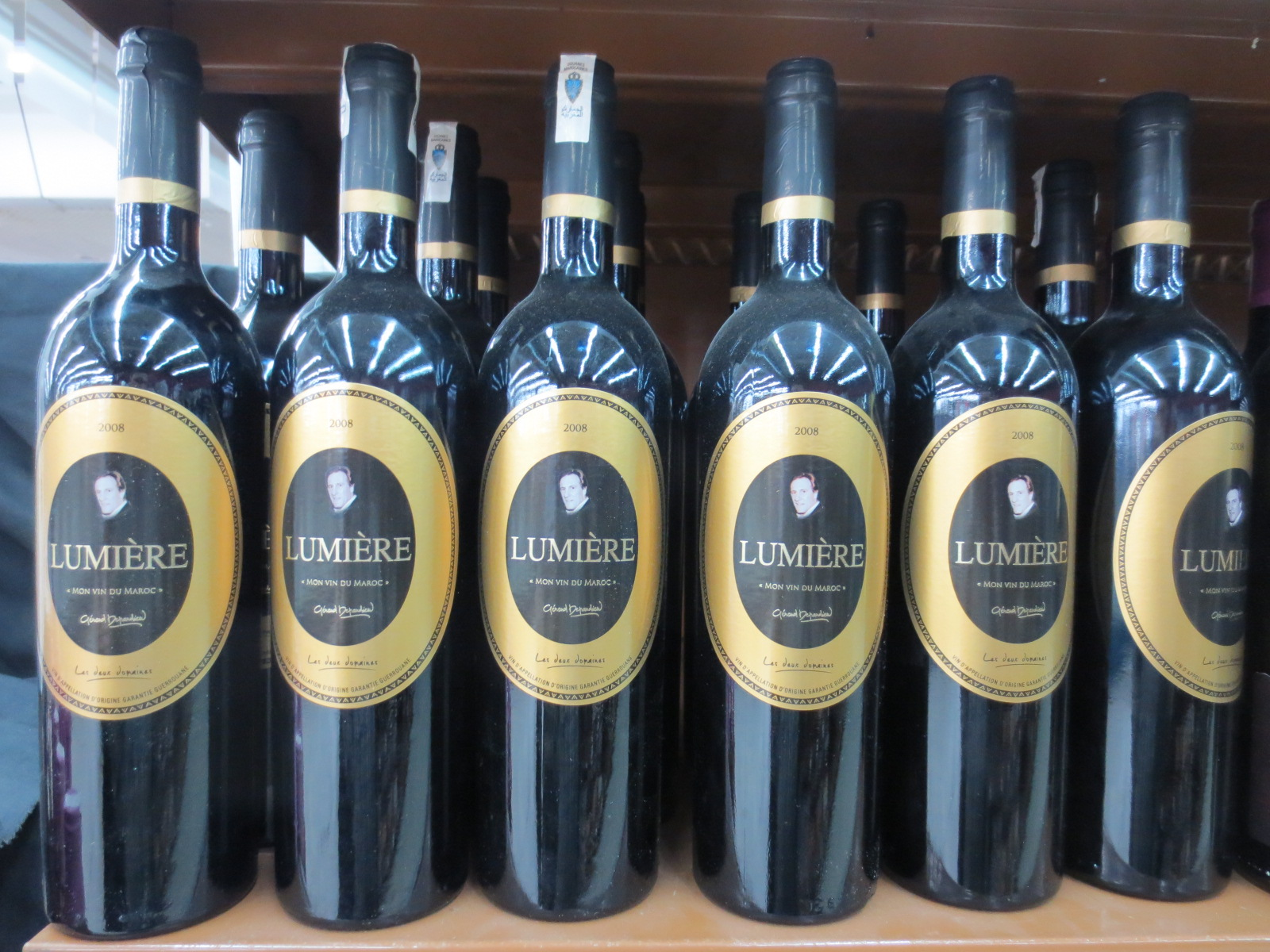
Bottles of Moroccan wine produced by Gérard Depardieu

In 1983, Depardieu created the company DD Productions to co-produce films and rent filming equipment. Owning shares of the films he starred in allowed him to earn additional income from box office receipts, home video and television broadcasts.

Apart from his film career, Depardieu is also a viticulturist, having invested in vineyards since the late 1980s. He has owned the Château de Tigné (Tigné Castle) in the Loire Valley since 1989, producing wine on the estate. His other wine properties include estates in the Médoc, Hérault, Burgundy, Eastern Europe, the Maghreb, and South America.

The luxury restaurant La Fontaine Gaillon in Paris, owned by Depardieu between 2003 and 2019.

In 2003, Depardieu bought La Fontaine Gaillon, a luxury restaurant in the 2nd arrondissement of Paris. Its wine cellar, which consisted of bottles of Château Haut-Brion, Château Latour, Meursault and Saint-Émilion, was recognized by the Gault Millau guide. Over the years, Depardieu's assets in Paris also included another French cuisine restaurant, a Japanese delicatessen, a wine bar, and a seafood shop. By 2012, he employed over a hundred people in France through fifteen companies.

Over time, Depardieu diversified by investing in a variety of ventures, including an unsuccessful oil exploration project in Cuba in the late 1990s. In the same decade, he partnered with Planet Hollywood to supply them with wine. He has also generated substantial income from commercials and advertising campaigns. In the early 1990s, he starred in two Barilla commercials, directed respectively by Ridley Scott and David Lynch. He was later featured in various campaigns aimed exclusively at Eastern European markets.

In 2013, Depardieu's wealth was estimated at US$200 million. He said that the 2006 divorce settlement with his wife cost him €15 million. Depardieu also owned a hôtel particulier built in 1805 in the 6th arrondissement of Paris, which was valued at €50 million ($53.5 million).

In the late 2010s, Depardieu began parting with some of his assets in France, including La Fontaine Gaillon which he sold in 2019. He stated a wish to reduce his financial and legal connections to his country of birth, citing the French government's misuse of taxpayers' money as well as breaches of trust by some of his business partners. In February 2026, he sold his Parisian mansion to a British investment fund for a reported €22.6 million, incurring a significant loss.

=== Interests and hobbies ===
Depardieu has a passion for gastronomy, in particular for traditional French cuisine, and is a connoisseur of wine. He is an amateur gourmet cook himself, and published a cookbook in 2005. For about a decade, starting in the 1990s, he organized a yearly event promoting rosé wine at his Château de Tigné. In 2015 and 2016, he starred alongside La Fontaine Gaillon chef Laurent Audiot in the documentary series À pleines dents (roughly translating as With Gusto), broadcast on Arte. The show followed the pair as they traveled to explore French and European culinary traditions.

He is also a collector of fine art and motorcycles. In September 2023, he auctioned 250 art pieces from his extensive collection, including works by Auguste Rodin, Ossip Zadkine, and Alexander Calder, generating a reported €4 million.

Depardieu is a football enthusiast; as a teenager, he played as a goalkeeper for LB Châteauroux's youth team. He was for a time a prominent supporter of AJ Auxerre, particularly during their 1995-96 season that saw them win the Ligue 1 title and the Coupe de France. Over the years he has supported other teams, including Red Star FC and Olympique de Marseille.

== Sexual assault and rape allegations ==
=== First controversy ===
In 1977, Harry Stein interviewed Depardieu on the set of Get Out Your Handkerchiefs. The interview, which was published in the March–April 1978 issue of Film Comment under the title Depardieu: French Primitive, addressed the actor's rough upbringing and turbulent youth: it quoted Depardieu as saying that he had first participated in a gang rape when he was nine years old and in more rapes since then, and commenting that there were "too many [rapes] to count... There was nothing wrong with it. The girls wanted to be raped. I mean, there's no such thing as rape. It's only a matter of a girl putting herself in a situation where she wants to be." In November 1980, Depardieu granted an interview to the French magazine Lui where he addressed this story again, describing these acts less as rape than as a form of consensual group sex, involving girls who wished to "be part of the gang".

These remarks re-emerged in February 1991, shortly after the release of Green Card, when Time published an interview of Depardieu where he appeared to confirm these statements and commented: "it was absolutely normal in those circumstances. That was part of my childhood." On 15 March 1991, Depardieu's American publicist Lois Smith stated: "He's sorry, but it happened". The National Organization for Women requested an apology from Depardieu. Later that month, Depardieu's French publicist Claude Devy discounted the statements made by Smith, and Depardieu threatened legal action against any media outlet that published the comments. Depardieu's team said that Time had mistranslated the French verb "assister" as "participate", when a more accurate translation would be "attend" or "be witness to". Time refused to retract the story and claimed that Depardieu had indeed mentioned participating in the rapes.

At that time, Depardieu received support from the French media and political establishment, who claimed he was being mistreated and blamed American "puritanism." As a result, his career in France was not affected, and the French general public eventually forgot the controversy over time.

=== 2018 ===
In 2018, Depardieu was accused of sexual assault and rape by Charlotte Arnould, a 22-year-old actress and dancer. Arnould, whose identity was initially concealed, made her name public in December 2021.

The daughter of a longtime friend of Depardieu, Arnould said that in 2018 she had been invited by the actor to his Parisian home, ostensibly to discuss her career. There, she said, Depardieu had digitally raped her. According to her account, she went back to Depardieu's home to confront him, only to be similarly raped a second time. Arnould made her statement to police in Lambesc, southern France, after which the case was passed to prosecutors in the capital. Depardieu denied the allegations. In 2019, the charges were dropped after a nine-month police investigation. Actress Emmanuelle Debever commented on the news by accusing Depardieu of groping her on the set of the 1983 film Danton. The case was reopened in October 2020 after Arnould refiled the complaint.

Following Arnould's second complaint, French authorities charged Depardieu with rape in 2020. The actor rejected the allegation through his lawyer. In 2022, the Paris Court of Appeal dismissed Depardieu's attempt to have the charges dropped and announced that the actor would remain under formal investigation. In 2024, the Paris Public Prosecutor requested that Depardieu go to trial.

=== 2023–2024 ===
In April 2023, investigative website Mediapart reported that 13 women were accusing Depardieu of sexual assault and sexual harassment pertaining to incidents that occurred on film and television sets between 2004 and 2022. Several of these women said that Depardieu's behavior had happened in full view, without anyone objecting. In May, Charlotte Arnould gave a television interview where she recounted her version in detail. After several of his public performances were disrupted by feminist protesters and hecklers throughout the year, Depardieu published an open letter in October disputing the accusations.

Feminist protest paste-up in Paris calling out Depardieu for his behavior, May 2023

Depardieu's reputation was further damaged on 7 December 2023, when French television newsmagazine Complément d'enquête broadcast a segment about the accusations against the actor; titled Gérard Depardieu: The Fall of the Ogre, it included behind-the-scenes footage from a documentary project Depardieu had worked on with author-director Yann Moix. In these candid clips, shot in 2018 in North Korea, Depardieu could be seen making multiple obscene, sexist and misogynistic comments. Some of his remarks appeared to be directed at a child, though Depardieu disputed this in court.

Emmanuelle Debever died on the eve of the Complément d'enquête broadcast, after one week in a hospital following a suicide attempt, leading to speculation that her death was connected to the program. Six days after the segment was aired, Quebec premier François Legault announced that Gérard Depardieu would be stripped of the National Order of Quebec, on the grounds of the actor's "scandalous remarks". Depardieu became the first person in the history of the order to have his membership revoked. The segment also caused Radio Télévision Suisse, the French-language public broadcaster of Switzerland, to announce that for the time being it would no longer broadcast films starring Depardieu.

French politicians also reacted to the Complément d'enquête documentary. Culture Minister Rima Abdul Malak expressed outrage at Depardieu's behaviour, saying that he brought "shame" to France, and launched a disciplinary procedure that could lead to the actor's Legion of Honour being rescinded. In contrast, when asked for comment on 21 December, President Emmanuel Macron denounced the "manhunt" against Depardieu and said that the actor made France "proud". Macron later clarified that he was not "complacent" about sexual abuse and had defended Depardieu's presumption of innocence. Depardieu later sued France Télévisions over the report, though he withdrew his complaint in April 2026 after settling the matter with the broadcaster.

Depardieu's daughter Julie, her two half-siblings and several other family members signed an op-ed in support of him. His former partner Carole Bouquet went on television to defend his character. Another former partner, Karine Silla, also spoke in his defense.

Spanish author and photographer Ruth Baza told La Vanguardia that Depardieu had forcibly kissed and groped her in 1995 when, at age 23, she had interviewed him in Paris. Although the facts were likely time-barred, Baza filed a complaint in Spain, saying that she hoped it would encourage other people to speak out.

On 25 December 2023, a group of over 50 French actors and other prominent figures including Bouquet, Charlotte Rampling, Carla Bruni, Fanny Ardant, Nathalie Baye, Bertrand Blier, and Roberto Alagna, signed an open letter published Le Figaro, that denounced the "lynching" of Depardieu. The text, titled Do not cancel Gérard Depardieu, claimed that the actor was the victim of a "torrent of hatred", adding that he was "probably the greatest of all actors" and that attacking him was an attack on art itself. Several signatories, including Bouquet and Pierre Richard, eventually distanced themselves from the op-ed due to its content and after it was revealed that it had been penned by an actor with far-right connections.

Sophie Marceau, who had made two films with Depardieu during the 1980s, said that she had found his attitude on the set of Police "rude and inappropriate", though he would not harass famous actresses and instead "went more for low-level assistants". Marceau said she had mentioned Depardieu's conduct to French journalists at the time, but was completely disregarded. Miou-Miou, Depardieu's co-star in four films, said she had never seen him conduct himself improperly on sets but expressed consternation at his caught-on-camera behavior and said that she believed his accusers. In 2024, over 150 French performers signed a counter op-ed in Libération, saying that artists should be held accountable like anyone else and expressing support for the victims of sexual assault. That text eventually attracted 500 signatories. In January 2024, 23% of respondents to a French opinion poll stated that they would no longer watch films starring Depardieu.

In September 2023 and January 2024, respectively, two women, an actress and a crew member, filed complaints for assault against Depardieu, for incidents they said had occurred on film sets in 2007 and 2014. Both complaints were dismissed as time-barred. In February 2024, two other women, a set decorator and an assistant director, filed complaints against Depardieu for assaulting them in 2021 on the set of the film The Green Shutters. On 29 April 2024, police detained Depardieu for questioning. He was then formally charged for the incidents on the set of The Green Shutters. A total of six complaints were subsequently filed.

=== 2025–2026 ===
Depardieu's trial on two counts of sexual assault said to have occurred during the shooting of The Green Shutters was scheduled to begin in October 2024. On that day, Depardieu's lawyer said that health concerns meant he was unable to attend court. The trial was rescheduled, and began in March 2025.

Depardieu spoke in his own defense, taking the stand for three days. While he denied all allegations of sexual misconduct, he appeared at times confused and unfocused. Several women testified that they had been groped by Depardieu on film sets, or had seen him grope others. Fanny Ardant, his close friend and co-star in several films including The Green Shutters, testified to his good character. Conversely, Anouk Grinberg, who also co-starred with Depardieu in the film, attended the proceedings in support of the two plaintiffs.

In May 2025, Depardieu was convicted on both counts of sexual assault and handed an 18-month suspended sentence. In its ruling, the court noted that Depardieu did not appear to have "grasped the notion of consent". The court made the rare decision to also penalize the actor for the overly aggressive defense strategy employed by his attorney, who had harassed the plaintiffs during the proceedings. As a result, Depardieu was ordered to pay an additional €1,000 to each plaintiff. He appealed against his conviction. The appeal trial was scheduled to take place from 16 to 20 November 2026.

In September 2025, judges ordered him to stand trial on charges of rape and sexual assault in connection with the Charlotte Arnould case, though no date was set. Depardieu also appealed that decision.

On 12 November 2026, four days before the start of the appeal trial regarding his May 2025 conviction, the left-wing website Le Média published footage from the set of the 2013 film Turf, in which Depardieu could be seen groping an extra – clearly against her will. Mediapart authenticated the footage and interviewed the woman. On the same day, it was announced that Depardieu was withdrawing his appeal. On 16 November, Depardieu issued a statement saying that he accepted his conviction and apologized to all those who were hurt by his behavior on film sets. Three days later, Mediapart revealed that an actress had filed a complaint the previous year for sexual offenses that allegedly took place on the set of the 2019 film Thalasso, against Depardieu, his co-star Michel Houellebecq, and director Guillaume Nicloux.

== Awards and honors ==
Depardieu has been nominated for the César for Best Actor in a Leading Role 17 times during his career and won it twice, in 1981 and 1991. He was also nominated for an Oscar in 1990 for his role in Cyrano de Bergerac.

Besides his acting accolades, he has been awarded the following order of merits and honors:

- 1985: Chevalier (Knight) of the Ordre national du Mérite
- 1996: Chevalier (Knight) of the Légion d'honneur
- 2013: Cultural ambassador of Montenegro
- 2019: Tourism ambassador in France for Uzbekistan
- Formerly:
  - Honorary Knight of the National Order of Quebec, Canada, awarded in 2002, rescinded in 2023
  - Honorary citizen of Estaimpuis, Belgium: awarded in 2013, rescinded in 2023
  - Gold Medal of the City of Brussels, Belgium: awarded in 2018, rescinded in 2023

Association	Year	Category	Nominated work	Result
7 d'Or	1999	Audience Vote: Best Actor – Fiction	The Count of Monte Cristo	Won
20/20 Awards	2011	Best Actor	Cyrano de Bergerac	Nominated
Academy Awards	1991	Best Actor	Cyrano de Bergerac	Nominated
BAFTA Awards	1988	Best Actor in a Leading Role	Jean de Florette	Nominated
BAFTA Awards	1992	Best Actor in a Leading Role	Cyrano de Bergerac	Nominated
British Film Institute	1989	BFI Fellowship	—N/a	Won
César Awards	1976	Best Actor	7 morts sur ordonnance	Nominated
César Awards	1977	Best Actor	The Last Woman	Nominated
César Awards	1978	Best Actor	This Sweet Sickness	Nominated
César Awards	1979	Best Actor	Le Sucre	Nominated
César Awards	1981	Best Actor	The Last Metro	Won
César Awards	1983	Best Actor	Danton	Nominated
César Awards	1984	Best Actor	Les Compères	Nominated
César Awards	1985	Best Actor	Fort Saganne	Nominated
César Awards	1986	Best Actor	Police	Nominated
César Awards	1988	Best Actor	Under the Sun of Satan	Nominated
César Awards	1989	Best Actor	Camille Claudel	Nominated
César Awards	1990	Best Actor	Too Beautiful for You	Nominated
César Awards	1991	Best Actor	Cyrano de Bergerac	Won
César Awards	1995	Best Actor	Colonel Chabert	Nominated
César Awards	2007	Best Actor	When I Was a Singer	Nominated
César Awards	2011	Best Actor	Mammuth	Nominated
César Awards	2016	Best Actor	Valley of Love	Nominated
Dallas-Fort Worth Film Critics Association	1991	Best Actor	Cyrano de Bergerac	Nominated
Cannes Film Festival	1990	Best Actor	Cyrano de Bergerac	Won
David di Donatello Awards	1991	Best Foreign Actor	Cyrano de Bergerac	Nominated
European Film Awards	1990	European Actor of the Year	Cyrano de Bergerac	Nominated
European Film Awards	1998	Outstanding European Achievement in World Cinema	The Man in the Iron Mask	Nominated
Étoiles ďOr	2011	Best Actor	Mammuth	Won
Gérard Philipe Prize of the City of Paris	1973	Award for most promising theatre performer	—N/a	Won
Globes de Cristal Awards	2007	Best Actor	When I Was a Singer	Nominated
Globes de Cristal Awards	2011	Best Actor	Mammuth	Nominated
Golden Camera Awards	1996	Best International Actor	Guardian Angels	Won
Golden Globe Awards	1991	Best Actor – Motion Picture, Musical or Comedy	Green Card	Won
Hamburg Film Festival	2006	Douglas Sirk Award	—N/a	Won
Hollywood Reel Independent Film Festival	2011	Award of Excellence	Grenouille d'hiver	Won
I've Seen Films – International Film Festival	2012	Best Actor	Grenouille d'hiver	Won
Jules Verne Awards	2009	Jules Verne Lifetime Achievement Award	—	Won
London Critics Circle Film Awards	1992	Actor of the Year	Cyrano de Bergerac, Green Card, Uranus	Won
Lumière Awards	2007	Best Actor	When I Was a Singer	Won
Lumière Awards	2016	Best Actor	Valley of Love	Nominated
Lumière Awards	2017	Best Actor	The End	Nominated
Lumière Festival	2011	Lifetime Achievement Award	—N/a	Won
Montréal World Film Festival	1983	Best Actor	Danton	Won
Montréal World Film Festival	1995	Grand Prix Special des Amériques	—	Won
Montréal World Film Festival	1999	Grand Prix des Amériques	The Bridge	Nominated
Moscow Film Festival	2006	Stanislavsky Award for the outstanding achievement in the career of acting		Won
National Society of Film Critics Awards	1977	Best Actor	The Last Woman	Nominated
National Society of Film Critics Awards	1984	Best Actor	The Return of Martin Guerre, Danton	Won
New York Film Critics Circle Awards	1983	Best Actor	The Return of Martin Guerre, Danton	Nominated
San Francisco International Film Festival	1994	Piper-Heidsieck Award	—N/a	Won
Telluride Film Festival	1990	Silver Medallion Award	—N/a	Won
The Stinkers Bad Movie Awards	2000	Worst Supporting Actor	102 Dalmatians	Nominated
The Stinkers Bad Movie Awards	2000	Worst On-Screen Couple (shared with Glenn Close)	102 Dalmatians	Nominated
The Stinkers Bad Movie Awards	2000	Worst On-Screen Hairstyle	102 Dalmatians	Nominated
Venice Film Festival	1985	Volpi Cup for Best Actor	Police	Won
Venice Film Festival	1997	Career Golden Lion	—N/a	Won
Verona Love Screens Film Festival	2000	Best Actor	The Bridge	Won

== Theatre ==
Year	Title	Author	Director
1967	Boudu sauvé des eaux	René Fauchois	Jean-Laurent Cochet
1969	The Boys in the Band	Mart Crowley	Jean-Laurent Cochet
1970	There's a Girl in My Soup	Terence Frisby	Raymond Rouleau
1971	Galapagos	Jean Chatenet	Bernard Blier
1971	Morning	Israel Horovitz	Laurent Wesman
1972	Home	David Storey	Claude Régy
1972	Saved	Edward Bond	Claude Régy
1973	Isma	Nathalie Sarraute	Claude Régy
1973	Isaac	Michel Puig	Claude Régy
1974	The Ride across Lake Constance	Peter Handke	Claude Régy
1977	They Are Dying Out	Peter Handke	Claude Régy
1984	Tartuffe	Molière	Jacques Lassalle
1986	Lily Passion	Barbara, Luc Plamondon	Pierre Strosser
1999	Les Portes du ciel	Jacques Attali	Stéphane Hillel
2004	The Beast in the Jungle	Henry James	Jacques Lassalle
2014	Love Letters	A. R. Gurney	Benoît Lavigne
2015	La Musica deuxième	Marguerite Duras	Himself
2015	The Ingrid Bergman Tribute	Isabella Rossellini	Isabella Rossellini
2017–2023	Depardieu chante Barbara	Barbara (lyrics), Gérard Daguerre (music)	Jean-Paul Scarpitta

== Discography ==
- 1980 : OK Cafard (Je suis noir), lyrics by Élisabeth Depardieu (single)
- 1980 : Ils ont dit moteur... Coupez !, lyrics by Élisabeth Depardieu and Jean-Claude Mejstelman (LP)
- 1980 : Comédien Comédien, lyrics by Élisabeth Depardieu (single)
- 1980 : La P'tite Agathe, lyrics by Serge Gainsbourg (single, soundtrack from the film Je vous aime)
- 1986 : Lily passion, by and with Barbara (show recording)
- 1992 : I'll Strangle You, with Anneli Drecker, music by Hector Zazou (spoken words)
- 1997 : Un piccolo aiuto, with Zucchero
- 1997 : L'Histoire du soldat, by Igor Stravinsky (spoken words)
- 2006 : Quand j'étais chanteur (soundtrack for the film When I Was a Singer)
- 2009 : Rendez vous in Paris, with Jasmine Roy
- 2010 : Oedipus rex, by Igor Stravinsky (spoken words)
- 2017 : Depardieu chante Barbara, lyrics by Barbara (show recording)
- 2019 : Blond, with Philippe Katerine

== Books ==
- Lettres volées, Lattès, 1988, ISBN 978-2709607438
- Vivant !, with Laurent Neumann, Plon, 2004, ISBN 978-2290347430
- Lire Saint Augustin, with André Mandouze, Desclée De Brouwer, 2004, ISBN 978-2220055039
- Ma cuisine, France Loisirs, 2005, ISBN 978-2-263-03868-6
- Depardieu grandeur nature, with Richard Mellou, Flammarion, 2009, ISBN 978-2081228245
- Ça s'est fait comme ça, with Lionel Duroy, XO, 2014, ISBN 978-2845637320
- Innocent, Le Cherche Midi, 2015, ISBN 978-2-7491-4889-2
- Monstre, Le Cherche Midi, 2017, ISBN 978-2749153148
- Ailleurs, Le Cherche Midi, 2020, ISBN 978-2290252239

== See also ==
- Cinema of France
- List of celebrities who own wineries and vineyards
