= La Dormeuse Duval =

- Directed by: Manuel Sanchez
- Written by: Muriel Sanchez-Harrar; Manuel Sanchez
- Produced by: Marylise Den Hollander
- Starring: Dominique Pinon, Marina Tomé, Delphine Depardieu, Pascal Turmo
- Cinematography: Sophie Cadet
- Edited by: Fabien Montagner
- Music by: Étienne Perruchon
- Release date: February 22, 2017
- Running time: 110 minutes
- Country: France
- Language: French

La Dormeuse Duval is a 2017 French comedy film directed by Manuel Sanchez. It stars Dominique Pinon, Marina Tomé, Delphine Depardieu and Pascal Turmo.

== Plot ==
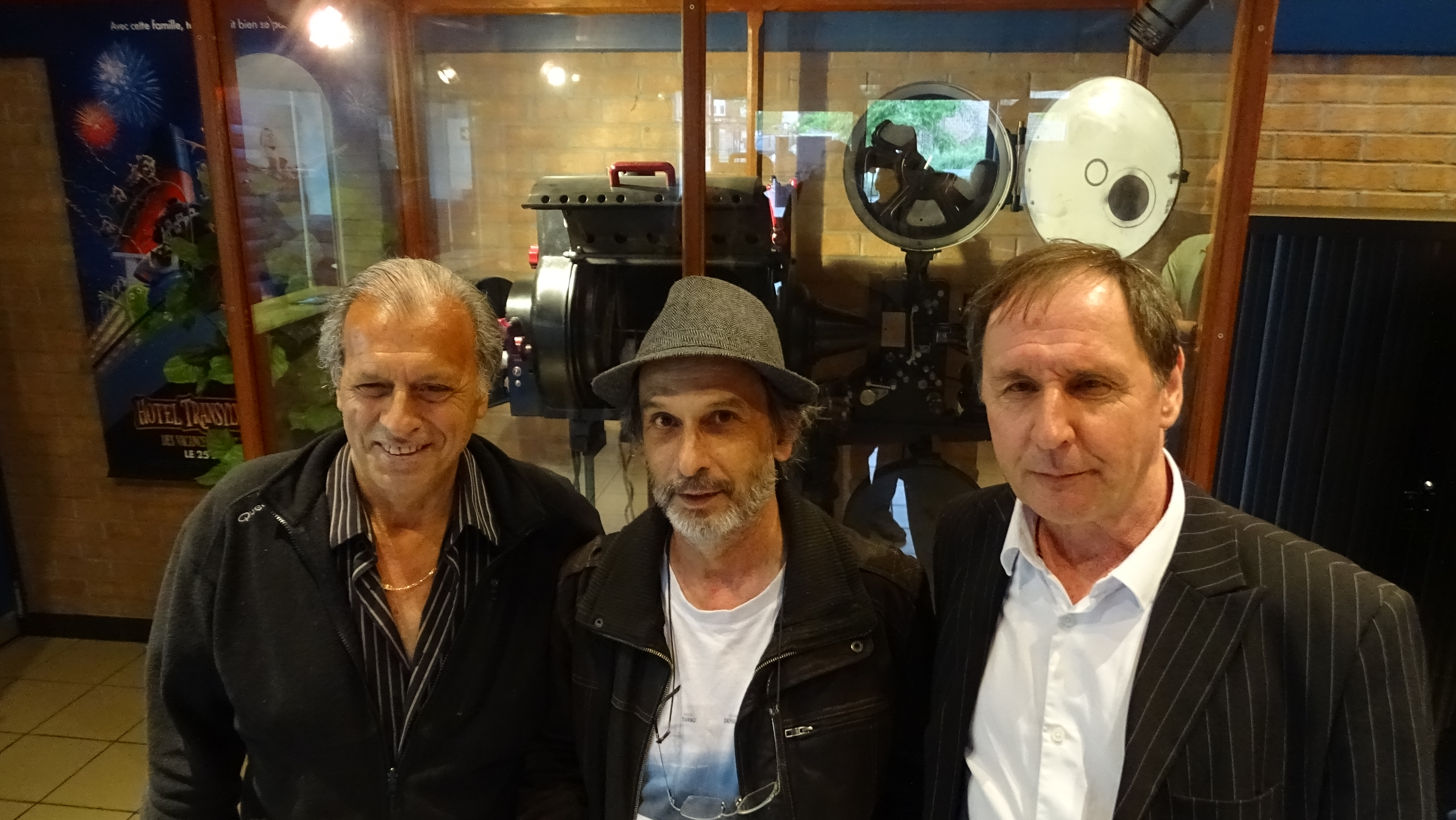
At Idéal Cinéma Jacques Tati in Aniche, at the screening of La Dormeuse Duval on June 1, 2018: Toni Librizzi, actor (left); Manuel Sanchez, director (center); and Jean-Marcel Crusiaux, actor (right).

In a village by the Meuse river, located near the French-Belgian border, a factory storekeeper named Basile Matrin leads a dreary life with his wife, Rose. The young Maryse Duval, who had just come back from Paris, has abandoned her dreams of becoming an actress. She will unwittingly turn their life upside down. Basile's great friend and neighbour, who is a reporter for a local newspaper, witnesses the comical drama that is unfolding on the street outside his house, and will unwillingly be drawn into this.

== Cast ==
- Dominique Pinon as Basile Matrin
- Marina Tomé as Rose Matrin
- Delphine Depardieu as Maryse Duval
- Pascal Turmo as Le Journaleux

== Production ==
The film was shot in the summer of 2015, mostly in Monthermé, but also in Nouzonville, Charleville-Mézières and Neufmanil.
