= Julie Depardieu =

French actress (born 1973)

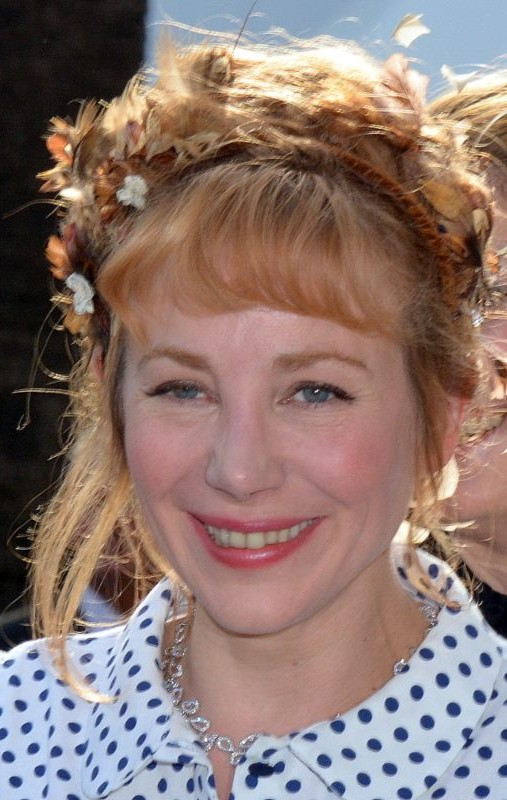
- Depardieu at the 2016 Cannes Film Festival
- Born: Julie Marion Depardieu; 18 June 1973 (age 53); Boulogne-Billancourt, France
- Occupation: Actress
- Years active: 1994–present
- Children: 2
- Parent(s): Gérard Depardieu; Élisabeth Depardieu
- Relatives: Guillaume Depardieu (brother); Alain Depardieu (uncle); Delphine Depardieu (cousin)
- Awards: César Award for Most Promising Actress (2004); César Award for Best Supporting Actress (2004 and 2008)

Julie Marion Depardieu (French: [ʒyli dəpaʁdjø]; born 18 June 1973) is a French actress.

== Early life ==
Born 18 June 1973 in Boulogne-Billancourt, she is the daughter of actors Gérard and Élisabeth Depardieu. Her older brother, Guillaume Depardieu (1971-2008) was also an actor. She has two paternal half-siblings: half-sister Roxane and half-brother Jean.

She has two sons, Billy (b. 2011) and Alfred (b. 2012), with her partner, singer-songwriter Philippe Katerine.

== Career ==
In 2004, she won two César Awards (Best Supporting Actress and Best Young Actress) for La petite Lili and won another (Best Supporting Actress) for Un secret in 2008. Depardieu was also nominated for a César Award for Best Supporting Actress in 2005 for her performance in Podium.

In 2008, she also directed her first operette les contes d'Hoffmann (Tales of Hoffmann) at the Vaux le Vicomte castle, the castle which inspired king Louis XIV to build Versailles.

== Filmography ==
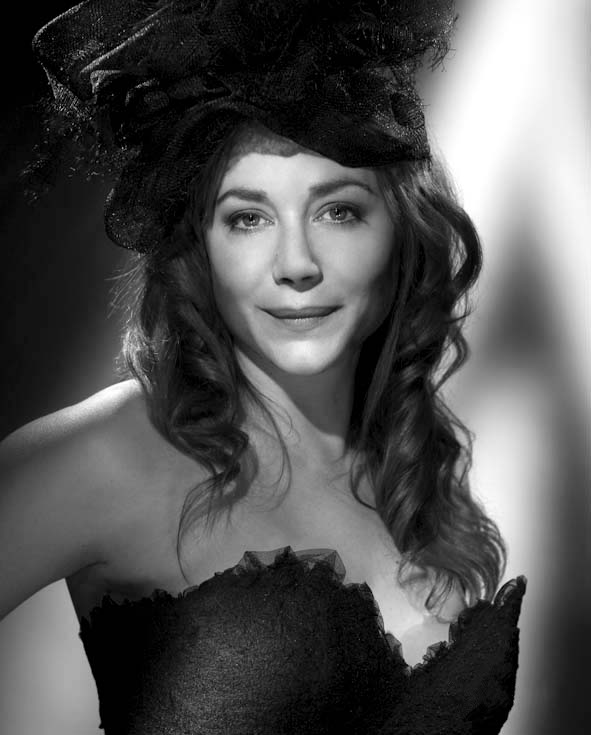
Julie Depardieu, by Harcourt

Year	Title	Role	Director	Notes
1994	Colonel Chabert	Mathilde	Yves Angelo	
1994	The Machine	The Nurse	François Dupeyron	
1996	Les liens du coeur	Sarah	Josée Dayan	TV movie
1996	La passion du docteur Bergh	Valerie Letechin	Josée Dayan (2)	TV movie
1998	L'examen de minuit	Séréna Dartois	Danièle Dubroux	Nominated - Acteurs à l'Écran - Best Actress
1998	Intime conviction	Laurence	John Lvoff	TV movie
1998	The Count of Monte Cristo	Valentine De Villefort	Josée Dayan (3)	TV Mini-Series
1999	Peut-être	Nathalie	Cédric Klapisch	
2000	Sentimental Destinies	Marcelle	Olivier Assayas	
2000	In extremis	Anne	Etienne Faure	
2000	Love me	Barbara	Laetitia Masson	
2000	Les marchands de sable	Catherine	Pierre Salvadori	
2000	30 ans	Ariane	Laurent Perrin	
2000	Grand oral	Sylvie	Yann Moix	Short
2000	HLA identique	Valéria	Thomas Briat	Short
2000	Deux femmes à Paris	Maud	Caroline Huppert	TV movie
2001	God Is Great and I'm Not	Valérie	Pascale Bailly	
2001	Veloma	Lucie	Marie de Laubier	
2001	Bad Karma	Crystal	Alexis Miansarow	
2001	Zaïde, un petit air de vengeance	Marie	Josée Dayan (4)	TV movie
2001	Les enfants d'abord	Cécilia Contini	Aline Issermann	TV movie
2001	L'aîné des Ferchaux	Lina	Bernard Stora	TV movie
2003	Little Lili	Jeanne-Marie	Claude Miller	César Award for Best Supporting Actress; César Award for Most Promising Actress
2003	Bolondok éneke	Veronique / Marie	Csaba Bereczky	
2003	Bienvenue au gîte	Nina Strong	Claude Duty	
2003	Le lion volatil	Clarisse	Agnès Varda	Short
2003	Spartacus	The Demonstrator	Virginie Lovisone	Short
2003	Le porteur de cartable	Mademoiselle Ceylac	Caroline Huppert (2)	TV movie
2003	Jean Moulin, une affaire française	Sister Henriette	Pierre Aknine	TV movie
2003	La maison des enfants	Charlotte	Aline Issermann (2)	TV Mini-Series
2004	A Very Long Engagement	Véronique Passavant	Jean-Pierre Jeunet	
2004	Podium	Véro	Yann Moix (2)	Nominated - César Award for Best Supporting Actress
2004	Eros thérapie	Agathe	Danièle Dubroux (2)	
2004	Milady	Constance Bonacieux	Josée Dayan (5)	TV movie
2005	The Fever	Julie	Alessandro D'Alatri	
2005	Burnt Out	Flora	Fabienne Godet	
2005	The Art of Breaking Up	Amélie	Michel Deville	
2005	Le passager	Jeanne	Éric Caravaca	
2005	L'oeil de l'autre	Alice	John Lvoff (2)	
2005	Celle qui reste	Jeanne	Virginie Sauveur	TV movie
2005	Toilet Zone	Various	Olivier Baroux	TV series
2005	Les Rois maudits	Jeanne de Poitiers	Josée Dayan (6)	TV Mini-Series
2006	Toi et moi	Ariane	Julie Lopes-Curval	
2006	Blame It on Fidel	Marie de la Mesa	Julie Gavras	
2006	Poltergay	Emma	Éric Lavaine	
2006	Essaye-moi	Jacqueline	Pierre-François Martin-Laval	
2006	La mémoire des autres	Elise	Pilar Anguita-MacKay	
2006	Qui m'aime me suive	Praline	Benoît Cohen	
2006	Toothache	Bibi	Ian Simpson	
2007	The Witnesses	Julie	André Téchiné	
2007	Rush Hour 3	Paulette	Brett Ratner	
2007	A Secret	Louise	Claude Miller (2)	César Award for Best Supporting Actress; Nominated - Globes de Cristal Award for Best Actress
2007	Cow-Boy	Christelle Piron	Benoît Mariage	
2008	Female Agents	Jeanne Faussier	Jean-Paul Salomé	
2008	Elles et Moi	Alice Brunetti	Bernard Stora (2)	TV Mini-Series
2009	All About Actresses	Herself	Maïwenn	
2009	Park Benches	The Neighbor's Wife	Bruno Podalydès	
2009	La femme invisible	Lili	Agathe Teyssier	
2009	Au siècle de Maupassant	Adèle	Laurent Heynemann	TV series (1 Episode)
2010	Pièce montée	Marie	Denys Granier-Deferre	
2010	Le mariage à trois	Harriet	Jacques Doillon	
2010	Je suis un no man's land	Sylvie	Thierry Jousse	
2010	Libre échange	Jocelyne Delvaux	Serge Gisquière	
2011	The Art of Love	Isabelle	Emmanuel Mouret	
2011	Possessions	Maryline Caron	Éric Guirado	
2011	Bouquet final	Claire	Josée Dayan (7)	TV movie
2013	Opium	Nyx	Arielle Dombasle	
2013	Ma maman est en Amérique...	Yvette	Marc Boréal & Thibaut Chatel	
2013	Indiscrétions	Julie Lefort	Josée Dayan (8)	TV movie
2013	La Famille Katz	Théa	Arnauld Mercadier	TV series (6 Episodes)
2014	Les Yeux jaunes des crocodiles	Joséphine Cortes	Cécile Telerman	
2014	À la vie	Hélène	Jean-Jacques Zilbermann	
2014	Magnum	Herself	Philippe Katerine	TV movie
2016	Crash Test Aglaé	Liette	Éric Gravel	
2016	We Are Family	Agnès	Gabriel Julien-Laferrière	
2017	Capitaine Marleau	Jeannette Poupeaux	Josée Dayan (9)	TV series (1 Episode)
2018-	Alexandra Ehle	Alexandra	François Basset, Nicolas Guicheteau, Magaly Richard-Serrano	TV series (Lead)

== Theatre ==
Year	Title	Author	Director	Notes
2003	Mémoires de deux jeunes mariées	Honoré de Balzac	Jacques Décombe	
2004	Le Jardin aux betteraves	Roland Dubillard	Jean-Michel Ribes	
2008	The Tales of Hoffmann	Jacques Offenbach	Julie Depardieu & Stéphan Druet	
2010-11	Nono	Sacha Guitry	Michel Fau	Nominated - Molière Award for Best Actress
2014	The Misanthrope	Molière	Michel Fau (2)	(as Célimène)
