= Rassam =

- Pronunciation: [/ras.saːm/]

Origin
- Origin: Arabic: رسام (Rassam)
- Meaning: artist, painter, draftsman

Rassam (Arabic: رسّام) also spelled with the definite article Al Rassam, is a common Arabic surname meaning artist, painter or draftsman. The noun is also present in Azerbaijani, Turkish, and Uzbek.

Notable people with the surname include:

- Abdul Qadir Al Rassam (1882–1952), Iraqi painter
- Dimitri Rassam, French film producer
- Hind Rassam Culhane, Iraqi and Lebanese educator and journalist of Assyrian descent
- Hormuzd Rassam (1826–1910), native Assyrian and Christian Assyriologist
- Hossein Rassam, former employee of the British Embassy in Tehran
- Hussam Al Rassam, Iraqi singer
- Ibn Rassam, Egyptian Muslim alchemist and tile-maker and mosaic designer, who flourished during the Mamluk Bahri dynasty
- Jean-Pierre Rassam, French Lebanese film producer
- Julien Rassam, French Lebanese actor

== See also ==
- Rasam, a South Indian soup
- Rassam cylinder, named after Hormuzd Rassam
