= Nathalie Rheims =

French actress and journalist

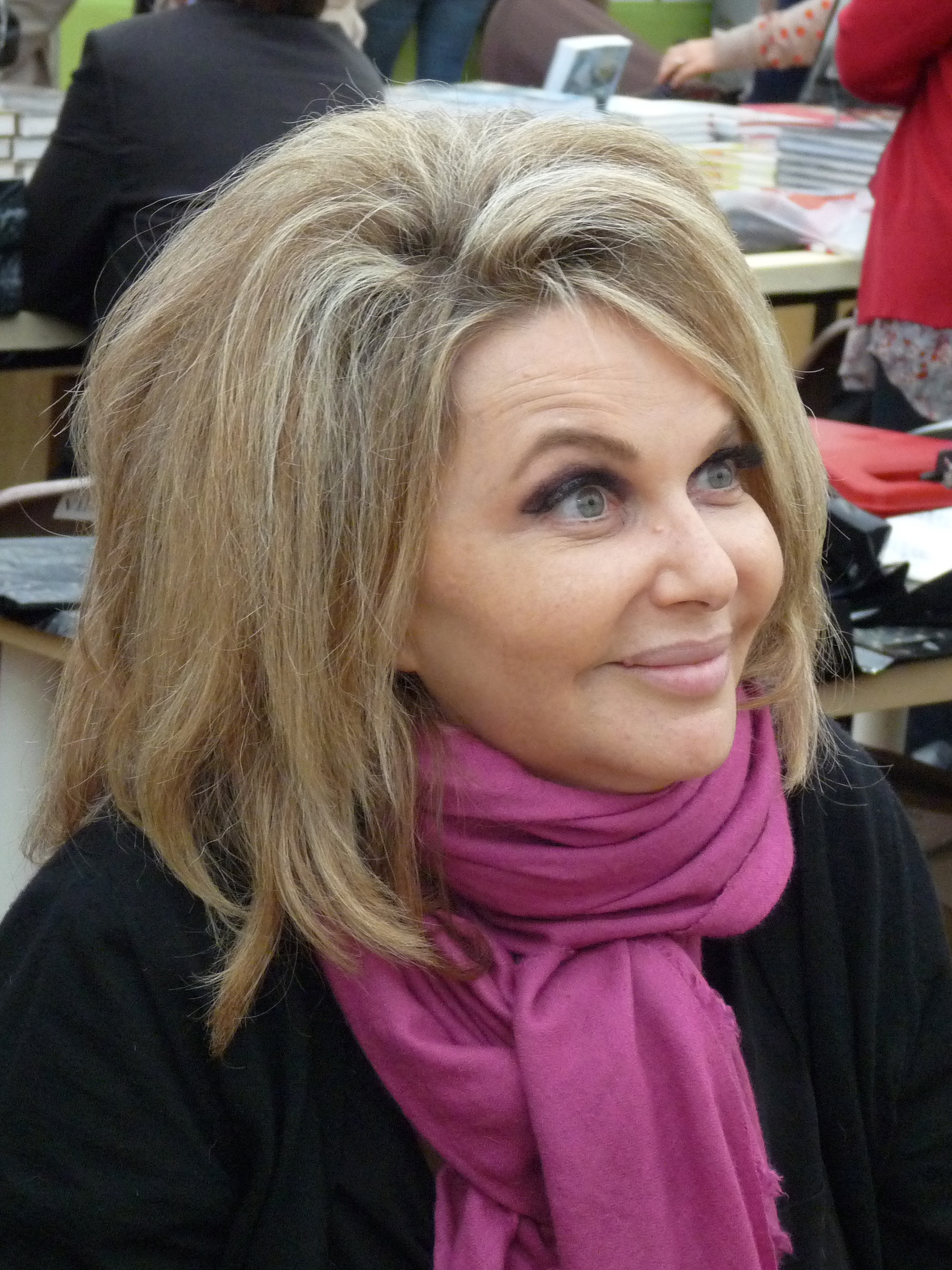
- Born: Nathalie Alix Jeanne Rheims; April 25, 1959 (age 67); Neuilly-sur-Seine, France
- Occupations: Writer, film producer, journalist, actress
- Spouse(s): Frédéric Botton (1982–1987); Léo Scheer (1989-2024)
- Partner: Claude Berri (1998-2009)
- Parents: Maurice Rheims (father); Lili Krahmer (mother)
- Relatives: Bettina Rheims (sister)
- Awards: Knight of the Legion of Honour (2012), Officer of the Order of Arts and Letters (2016)

Nathalie Rheims (born April 25, 1959, in Neuilly-sur-Seine) is a French writer and film producer.

== Biography ==
=== Family ===
Nathalie Rheims came from an Alsatian Jewish family on her father's side: she was the granddaughter of General Léon Rheims, and the daughter of Maurice Rheims, an auctioneer and French Academy member. Her mother, Lili Krahmer, half-sister to David de Rothschild, abandoned her when she was 15 years old. She had a brother, Louis, who died at 33 years old, and for whom she wrote her first novel, L'Un pour l’autre, in 1999. She also had a sister, the photographer Bettina Rheims. (Note: Sister of Nathalie Rheims, photographer Bettina Rheims created the album cover for Comme j'aimais la vie (1981) by Frédéric Botton, Nathalie Rheims' first husband. Bettina also designed the cover for Voix "Off" (1984) by Nathalie Rheims.)

On her mother's side, she was related to the Rothschild family through both her great-grandfather (the "von Worms" branch) and her great-grandmother (the "Naples" branch) of the banker Mayer Amschel Rothschild (1744–1812), founder of the dynasty. Additionally, her maternal grandmother, Alix Schey de Koromla, married Baron Guy de Rothschild in her second marriage.

She was also the goddaughter of actor Yul Brynner.

=== Career ===
Nathalie Rheims began her artistic career as a theater actress. In 1976, at the age of 17, she entered the conservatory on Rue Blanche. She performed in La Mante polaire by Serge Rezvani, directed by Jorge Lavelli, with Maria Casarès in the lead role in 1977 at the Théâtre de la Ville. Until 1983, she alternated between theater and television roles. From 1981 to 1985, she also worked as a journalist for the magazine Elle. In 1982, she released her first 45 RPM record, Asphalte. As a singer, she adopted the pseudonym "Alix," the name of her maternal grandmother. She released four more singles, all written by her then-husband, Frédéric Botton. In total, he wrote seven songs for her. The last one, Big Bang Song !, was the theme song for the amusement park Big Bang Schtroumpf. During this period, the trio of Nathalie Rheims, Frédéric Botton, and Jean-Daniel Mercier wrote six of the seven songs for the album Number One of the Paradis Latin cabaret. (Note: Jean-Daniel Mercier also wrote Gargantua for singer Carlos and La Parade de Mirapolis, whose Mirapolis theme park was contemporaneous with Big Bang Schtroumpf.) In 1985, Nathalie Rheims transitioned to producing, initially for TV6, then France 2, producing Haute curiosité, an arts program presented by Claude Sérillon and Maurice Rheims.

In 1999, she published her first novel, L’un pour l’autre (Galilée publishing), awarded the Gai Savoir Prize. In 2000, she published Lettre d’une amoureuse morte with Flammarion. This was followed by Les Fleurs du silence and L’Ange de la dernière heure in 2001 and 2002. In 2002, Rheims co-produced the film Une femme de ménage. In 2003, she released Lumière invisible à mes yeux, published by Léo Scheer. Le Rêve de Balthus, Le Cercle de Megiddo, and L'Ombre des autres were released in September 2004, 2005, and 2006, making her a best-selling author.

As the partner and collaborator of producer-director Claude Berri, she co-founded the film production company Hirsch Production and worked as an associate producer on films such as L'un reste, l'autre part, Les Enfants, Le Démon de midi, La Maison du bonheur, Ensemble, c'est tout, La Graine et le Mulet, and Bienvenue chez les Ch'tis.

At Claude Berri's request, she wrote the song L'un part, l'autre reste, performed by Charlotte Gainsbourg. The soundtrack of the film, composed and arranged by André Manoukian and Frédéric Botton, was later covered by Sylvie Vartan and included in several of her albums.

In 2007, Rheims published her ninth book, Journal intime, roman. Her eighth novel, L'Ombre des autres, was planned to be adapted for the screen with Mylène Farmer in the lead role, but the project was canceled following Claude Berri's death.

In 2008, she published her tenth novel, Le Chemin des sortilèges.

In 2015, she released her autobiographical novel, Place Colette, subtitled Détournement de majeur, which tells the story of her romance at age 14 with an actor 30 years her senior.

Subsequent works include Le père Lachaise, jardin des ombres (2014), La mémoire des squares (2016), Ma vie sans moi (2017), Des reins et des cœurs (2019), Roman (2020), Danger en rive (2021), and Au long des jours (2023).

== Personal life ==
Rheim's first husband was composer Frédéric Botton. In 1989, she married publisher Léo Scheer. They later separated, but remained married until his death in 2024. In 1998, she became the partner of film director and producer Claude Berri, remaining with him until his death in 2009.

After Berri's death, Rheims became involved in the legal dispute regarding his inheritance. Thomas Langmann, Berri's oldest surviving son, accused her, his half-brother Darius and his father's second wife Sylvie Gautrelet of misappropriating his father's assets. In March 2025, Rheims, Gautrelet, Darius Langmann and several other people wered indicted for conspiracy to commit theft and tax evasion.

== Publications ==
- L’Un pour l’autre, Galilée, 1999 (reissued in Folio) "Book entry on the publisher's website". Galilée.
- Lettre d’une amoureuse morte, Flammarion, 2000 (Folio)
- Les Fleurs du silence, Flammarion, 2001 (Folio)
- L’Ange de la dernière heure, Flammarion, 2002 (Folio)
- Lumière invisible à mes yeux, Léo Scheer, 2003
- Le Rêve de Balthus, Fayard-Léo Scheer, 2004 (Folio)
- Le Cercle de Megiddo, Léo Scheer, 2005 (Livre de poche)
- L'Ombre des autres, Léo Scheer, 2006
- Journal intime, Léo Scheer, 2007
- Le Chemin des sortilèges, Léo Scheer, 2008 ISBN 9782756101392
- Claude, Léo Scheer, 2009
- Car ceci est mon sang, Léo Scheer, 2010
- Le Fantôme du Fauteuil 32, Léo Scheer, 2011
- Laisser les cendres s’envoler, Léo Scheer, 2012
- Maladie d'amour, Léo Scheer, 2014
- Le Père-Lachaise, jardin des ombres, Michel Lafon, 2014
- Place Colette, Léo Scheer, 2015
- La mémoire des squares, Michel Lafon, 2016
- Ma vie sans moi, Léo Scheer, 2017
- Des reins et des cœurs, Léo Scheer, 2019
- Roman, Léo Scheer, 2020
- Danger en rive, Léo Scheer, 2021
- Au long des jours, Léo Scheer, 2023
- Ne vois-tu pas que je brûle, Léo Scheer, 2024.

== Filmography ==
=== Actress ===
- 1976: Un mari, c'est un mari by Serge Friedman (cinema)
- 1979: La Belle Époque de Gaston Couté written and directed by Philippe Pilard (television)
- 1979: L'Hôtel du libre échange by Georges Feydeau, directed by Guy Séligmann: one of Mathieu's daughters (television)
- 1979: Médecins de nuit by Pierre Lary, episode: Henri Gillot, retraité (TV series): Josiane (television)

=== Producer ===
- 2011: Mon père est femme de ménage by Saphia Azzeddine

=== Associate producer ===
- 2002: Une femme de ménage by Claude Berri
- 2003: Les Sentiments by Noémie Lvovsky
- 2004: San-Antonio by Frédéric Auburtin
- 2005: Les Enfants by Christian Vincent
- 2005: Le Démon de midi by Marie-Pascale Osterrieth
- 2006: La maison du bonheur by Dany Boon
- 2007: La Graine et le Mulet by Abdellatif Kechiche
- 2007: Ensemble, c'est tout by Claude Berri
- 2009: Trésor by Claude Berri

== Discography ==
45 RPM records (as "Alix")

- 1982: Asphalte
- 1983: Et si les étoiles... by Frédéric Botton
- 1984: Expérience inconnue by Frédéric Botton
- 1984: Voix "Off" by Frédéric Botton and Roland Romanelli
- 1989: Bing Bang Song by Frédéric Botton

== Honors ==
=== Decorations ===
- Knight of the Legion of Honour, 2012
- Officer of the Order of Arts and Letters promoted on February 10, 2016.

== See also ==
- Marcel Mouloudji
