= Masha Novoselova =

Russian model (born 1985)

- Born: 31 January 1985 (age 41); Tula, Russian SFSR, Soviet Union
- Spouse: Dimitri Rassam (m. 2010; div. 2016)
- Children: 2
- Modeling information
- Height: 1.75 m (5 ft 9 in)
- Hair color: Blonde
- Eye color: Blue
- Agency: Women Management (Paris); Traffic Models (Barcelona); UNIQUE DENMARK (Copenhagen); Modellink (Gothenburg); Modelwerk (Hamburg)

Masha Novoselova (Maria Novoselova, Маша Новоселова; born 31 January 1985) is a Russian model. She has been compared to others such as Natasha Poly, Sasha Pivovarova, and Natalia Vodianova. After signing with Storm Model Management, she became a sought after popular model in 2007.

== Career ==
Masha Novoselova has modelled for many advertising campaigns of numerous brands including Victoria's Secret, Christian Dior, Chanel, Gucci, Hugo Boss, Moschino, Nina Ricci, H&M, L'Oreal, Garnier, Chloe, Dolce and Gabbana, Yves Saint Laurent, Etam, Joop, Ungaro, Miss Sixty, Loewe, Louis Vuitton, Sisely, Patrizia Pepe, La Perla, Swarovski, and notably alongside David Beckham in Armani's underwear campaigns. She appeared in fashion magazines around the world, including global Vogue covers and editorials in Italy, Germany, Russia, Japan, China, Brasil and Britain, and the United States. She also appeared multiple times in Numero, Amica, Grazia, Madame Figaro, Mixte, V Magazine, Harper's Bazaar, V Pulp Magazine, Elle. Her industry breakthrough was her first cover in the 2008 Numero #85 magazine shot with Greg Kadel alongside Caroline Trentini. Masha Novoselova has worked with most of fashion's sought after photographers such as Mario Testino, Terry Richardson, Greg Kadel, David Sims, Camilla Åkrans, Txema Yeste, Karl Lagerfeld, Ellen von Unwerth, Mario Sorrenti, Inez Van Lamsweerde, and Marcus Piggott. She is also a popular catwalk cast during the Fashion Weeks in Paris, New York, London, and Milan, where she has walked the shows for notable fashion houses such as Chanel, Armani, Celine, Chloe, Stella McCartney, Gucci, Louis Vuitton, DSquared2, Fendi, Isabel Marant and many more.

== Private life ==
She married Dimitri Rassam, son of French actress Carole Bouquet and Jean-Pierre Rassam, on July 24, 2010. She gave birth to their daughter Darya Rassam in 2011. Their marriage ended in 2016. She gave birth to another daughter in January 2023 named Heidi.
