= Jacques Leibowitch =

French physician and researcher (1942–2020)

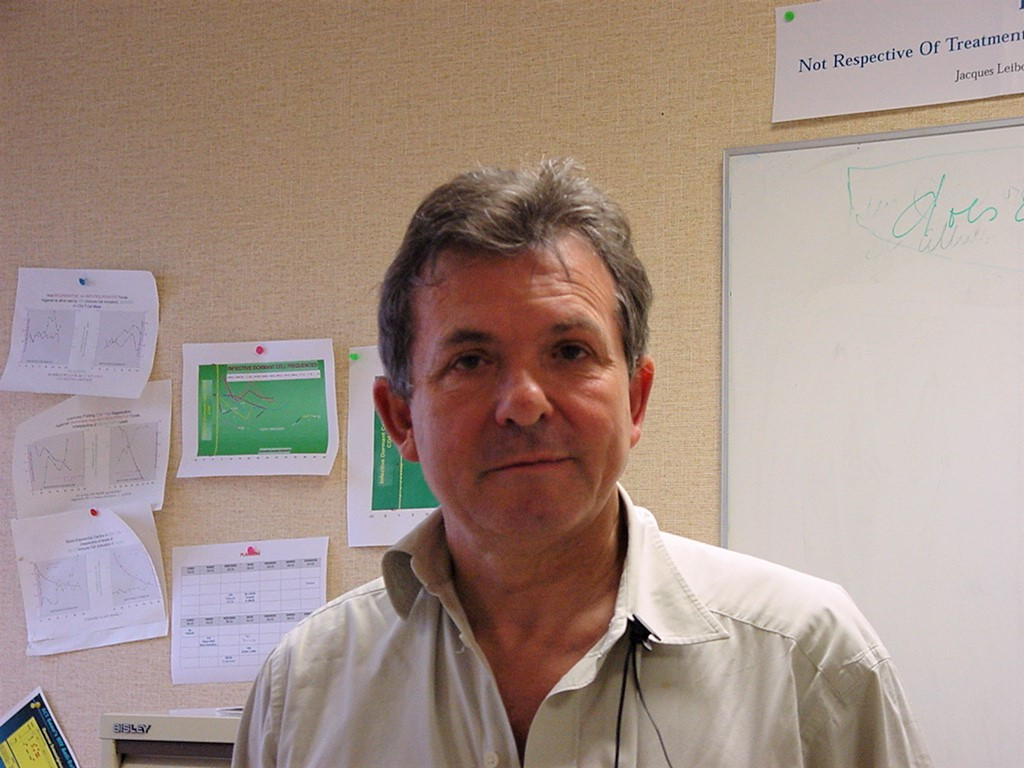
- Born: 1 August 1942; Clermont-Ferrand, France
- Died: 4 March 2020 (aged 77); Massy, France
- Known for: Identification of HIV as retro-virus, world pioneer use of tri-therapy treatment
- Spouse: Carole Bouquet (m. 1992; div. 1996)
- Awards: Chevaliers of the Légion d'honneur
- Scientific career
- Fields: HIV research
- Workplaces: Raymond Poincaré University Hospital

Jacques Leibowitch (1 August 1942 – 4 March 2020) was a French medical doctor and clinical researcher known for his contributions to the knowledge and treatment of HIV and AIDS, starting with his initial designation of a human retrovirus as the cause of AIDS, and his ground-breaking use of triple combination therapy for the effective control of HIV in the patient. A practicing physician in the infectiology department of the Raymond Poincaré University Hospital of Garches (directed by Prof. Christian Perronne, AP-HP), University lecturer Emeritus, he led the treatment program ICCARRE that proposes a dramatic reduction of weekly anti-HIV drug intake, down to 2-3 anti-viral pills a day taken 2 to 3 or 4 days a week, as opposed to the presently recommended seven days a week, as still universally prescribed. These reduced medical dosages are adequate, necessary and sufficient according to the results of his exploratory clinical research carried out since 2003. He is the author of the books "Un virus étrange venu d'ailleurs" (A strange virus of unknown origin), and "Pour en finir avec le sida" (Putting an end to AIDS).

== Biography ==
Jacques Leibowitch was born into a Jewish family. He did his medical studies in Paris (1960–1968), and did his physician training at the AP-HP hospitals (1969–1979) where he majored in clinical immunology, notably at the Necker hospital under Professor Jean Hamburger. He acquired his initial experience in research in 1962 at the Bellevue Hospital of New York, later returning to the United States for a Post-doctoral research program at Harvard Medical School (Pr John David, Robert Brigham Hospital, Boston, 1970–1972), where he studied cellular immunology. On his return to Paris, he finished his internship and went on to research Human Complement Biology at the Royal Hammersmith Hospital, London as post-graduate medical registrar (Pr Keith Peters, 1973–74), before undertaking his senior residency in nephrology at Necker, entering the Raymond Poincaré hospital at Garches as immunology assistant lecturer (1980). Jacques Leibowitch published many articles in international scientific journals.

== Scientific and medical contributions ==
The contributions of Jacques Leibowitch have marked the history of HIV and AIDS and their treatment:

- In 1982, he expounded the hypothesis that an exotic CD4 trope retro-virus might be at the origin of the growing AIDS epidemic and put the Montagnier and de Gallo teams on the track of the virus
- From 1984 to 1985, he removed from the Cochin hospital blood transfusion center the HIV contaminated blood samples, using a test quickly developed under the urgency of the situation by Dr Dominique Mathez, Leibowitch's main collaborator at the Raymond Poincaré hospital at Garches, anticipating the large-scale screening tests.
- Leibowitch and Dr. Mathez developed a home-made biological assay system to measure precisely the levels of active virus in the patient before and under treatment, demonstrating the both meager and transient effectiveness of the antiviral AZT as monotherapy.
- He is the father in Europe of the first anti-HIV treatments combining three anti-viral molecules (tri-therapy treatment) for the long-term control of HIV in the correctly treated patient.
- From 2003 to 2014, he showed that after a minimum 6-month period on conventional 7-day-a-week "attack" treatment, weekly anti-viral drug intake could be reduced by 40% to 80%, while maintaining optimal control over the patient's HIV.

=== Discovery of the HIV retro-virus ===
Jacques Leibowitch was at the center of the research on AIDS since the original outbreak of the epidemic, from the very moment when the investigation on its causative agent was launched. When the first series of AIDS cases in the United States were published in the New England Journal of Medicine and the Lancet in December 1981, Leibowitch noticed the similarity between the cases described in the United States and the historic case of a multiple-opportunistic infection syndrome in a Portuguese resident in Paris who had spent time in Angola and Mozambique between 1973 and 1976. He was then contacted by Willy Rozenbaum in March 1982 to set up the informal French Working Group SIDA, a self-nominated body to analyse the cases appearing in France.

When in July 1982, the first cases of AIDS appeared in hemophiliacs receiving highly filtered blood samples, the scientific community realized that AIDS was most likely caused by a virus. Jacques Leibowitch noticed some intriguing similarities between AIDS and the pathology linked to HTLV (Human T Cell Leukemia Lymphoma Virus), the only known human retro-virus at that time. Both situations affect CD4 T helper lymphocyte cells. HTLV induces the massive proliferation of one or several clones and their cancerization, whereas the other virus, the HIV virus tends to eradicate these cells without apparent discrimination. Otherwise, these two pathological descriptions are present in both Africa and the Caribbean (see A Strange Virus of Unknown Origin Jacques Leibowitch, Ballantine Books, New York, 1985, translated from Un Virus Etrange Venu d’Ailleurs, Grasset Paris 1984). Indeed, in both Paris and Brussels, doctors had seen cases of patients having lived or spent time in Francophone Africa or in Haiti who suffered from a disease with an undeniable resemblance to that arising at the time in the United States in "immuno-deficient homosexuals". Leibowitch, informed by the Franco-American literary author Gilles Barbedette of the announcement by Robert Gallo in Medical World News (1 August 1982) that an HTLV type retro-virus could be the cause of AIDS, found in that most succinct brief the profile matching his CD4-tropic exotic viral suspect (in Grasset, Ballantine Books, works cited). The retro-viral inspiration was thus consolidated and opened between Bethesda (Gallo) and Paris (Leibowitch et al.) from August 1982 onwards. Failing to find in the Paris team of Professor Jean-Paul Lévy or the Lille team of Dominique Stéhelin a French retro-virus specialist eager to pursue this line of investigation, he contacted upon a recommendation by Jean Paul Lévy Professor Robert Gallo in Bethesda, the then world-renowned virologist on HTLV. It was then in November 1982 that Gallo informed him from Bethesda of his initial virology findings in keeping with the AIDS HTLV-type virus hypotheses. For his part, Willy Rozenbaum, warned in private by Leibowitch that an exotic HTLV-type retrovirus could well be the cause of AIDS, embarked upon a discreet collaboration with the Luc Montagnier team of the Pasteur Institute. Montagnier, along with his collaborator Jean-Claude Chermann, had just recently received news of the HTLV and AIDS hypotheses by Dr Paul Prunet, the then director of « Recherché & Développement » at Sanofi-Pasteur-Marnes La Coquette, where Leibowitch had given a speech at the end of November 1982. The Montagnier team subsequently detected in the cell culture of patient BRU the traces of the first non HTLV retrovirus in January 1983, a virus eventually recognized as the cause of AIDS thanks to the conclusive additions by Robert Gallo and his group (April 1984) Memo Regarding Chronological Summary of Experiments Leading to the Isolation of HTLV-III from AIDS and ARC sur le site de la Jon Cohen AIDS Research Collection, 2 pages. Luc Montagnier and Françoise Barré-Sinoussi received the Nobel Prize for Medicine in 2008 for their work. In a letter to the prestigious magazine Nature Medicine in 2003, as well as in his Nobel Prize acceptance speech in 2008, Luc Montagnier recognized Jacques Leibowitch as being the initiator of the retro-virus hypothesis in France. However, the patented list of the discoverers of AIDS and HIV do not take Jacques Leibowitch into account for his contribution in the initial phases of the discovery. The scientific historian Mirko Grmek reflects back on the details of the stages that led to the discovery of the AIDS virus in his work "the History of AIDS" and the Jon Cohen AIDS Research Collection contains numerous archived documents on the subject. The book "Sida.O" (AIDS.O) written by D. Lestrade and G.Pialoux contains also many details on the history of AIDS.

=== Detection and elimination of HIV-positive contaminated blood at Garches and at Cochin ===
In 1984, while Luc Montagnier was working at the Institut Pasteur on an industrial test for HIV antibodies, Dominique Mathez and Jacques Leibowitch were working at Garches to elaborate a working test on tumour cells infected by the HTLV-III given to them by Pr Daniel Zagury at Paris University on behalf of Robert Gallo. Using this craftsman test, Mathez and Leibowitch discovered a disturbing frequency of individuals contaminated by the retro-virus amongst the polytransfusion recipients, and later, in collaboration with Dr François Pinon, head of transfusions at the Cochin hospital, go on to discover, the alarming proportion of HIV positive blood donors (1 in 200) in a pilot study carried out on 10,000 donors in the Paris and Ile-de-France area. The health authorities were alerted on this issue together with their dramatic consequences for hemophiliacs (« if the Cochin Hospital study is correct, then all anti-hemophiliac stocks are contaminated … », Jean Baptiste Brunet at the French General Directory on Health, Mars 1985 13). It was thanks to this artisanal test that 50 HIV positive blood donations, established then to be 100% contaminating, were taken out of the transfusion process, and 150 potential receivers of this blood were protected from contamination.

=== Measure of viral levels in patients and evaluation of the effectiveness of treatment ===
At Garches, Dominique Mathez and Jacques Leibowitch developed a sophisticated and reliable biological test enabling them to quantify active HIV virus levels in patients both before and during their antiviral treatment. Since 1987, patients in France most affected by the virus receive AZT treatment in an attempt to block the reproduction of the virus. It was with the aim of monitoring the progressive decline of virus levels in the treated patient that the team at Garches worked on their method. Leibowitch presented to world specialists assembled for the conference at Marnes la Coquette (Pasteur-les Cent Gardes symposium, November 1989) his results showing that the AZT monotherapy becomes quickly ineffective as demonstrated by returning viral levels in the treated patient. Though in the first month such levels were significantly, yet only transiently, reduced. The measuring of HIV viral levels would later become the industrial and clinical standard, the universally used test to follow the development of the virus and the effectiveness of various treatments. Jacques Leibowitch was the first in France to collect sequential cell specimens from individual patients at follow up, preserving living cell samples at extremely low temperatures since 1982. This live-frozen cell bank would later become precious for retrospective scientific investigations.

=== First tri-therapy trials based on viral end-point levels, "Stalingrad trials, the besieged retrovirus" (Libération, August 2013) ===
Jacques Leibowitch is the father of the tri-therapy treatments in Europe. Following the failure of AZT monotherapy to control HIV in the patient, the dual antiviral therapy (bi-therapy) soon revealed itself in Mathez and Leibowitch's pioneering test to be hardly more effective, thanks to the evidence revealed by the viral charge test at Garches. It is at this moment in 1994 that a new family of anti-HIV drugs emerges: the anti-proteases. Having observed in vitro the spectacular results of three combined anti-HIV nucleoside analogues (AZT +3TC +DDI) available for clinical use at the time (July 1994) and seen in patients the most effective antiviral impact of a first ever triple combination of nucleoside analogues (as shown by his home-made viral load quantitation system), Jacques Leibowitch went on to test the efficacy of the anti-proteases ... combined with pairs of nucleoside analogues to form a mixed-type triple combination therapy. On that basis, Leibowitch launched the Stalingrad Trial based on AZT+DDC+Ritonavir, a trial carried out in collaboration with Abbott, industrial producer of the anti-protease Ritonavir, under the protection of Health Minister Philippe Douste Blazy, outside the influence of the Agence Nationale de Recherches contre le SIDA (ANRS). The results of the Stalingrad trial underlined the major importance measuring viral levels in real time in the patient in order to evaluate the impact of a given antiviral treatment. The success of this first tri-therapy treatment in the world was presented, together with that of another tri-therapy carried out by the group Merck, at the Washington Congress in February 1996. The findings were published in a scientific journal in 1997.

The tri-therapy treatment has since been heralded a major turning point in the history of treatment of HIV infection.

=== Working towards an adjustment of maintenance treatments to adequate and sufficient dosages with the ICCARRE program ===
Since 2003, Jacques Leibowitch has been carrying out a pilot study aiming to diminish anti-HIV doses within weekly cycles. With ICCARRE(French abbreviation: Intermittent, in Short Cycles, the Anti Retrovirals may Retain Effectiveness), just under one hundred HIV positive patients at the Raymond Poincaré hospital have undergone reduced treatment maintenance therapy reduced to 4, or 3, or 2, or even 1 day a week, instead of the currently universally obligatory dosages of 7 out of 7 days, without the virus reappearing. ICCARRE has yet to be validated by regulatory bodies as a recommended anti-HIV regime; were its dosages and recommendations to be confirmed in future prospective clinical trials, the ICCARRE study would open a new avenue in anti-HIV long-term therapy.

According to the ICCARRE regime: following an early initial period in which control of retro-viral levels requires 7-day-a-week "attack treatment" during one semester or more, weekly anti-viral dosages, necessary and sufficient to achieve effective long term control of the virus, may be administered in weekly reduced dosage; such a regime offers a number of advantages including : adhesion to the deontological principle of not exceeding required medicine dosages; minimization of the toxic effects of these heavy chemical treatments over a long-term period; improved willing patient acceptance of an effective treatment due to a physiologically and psychologically more acceptable programme; reduction from between 40% and 80% of treatments that become exorbitantly costly over the long term. The first results of the ICCARRE study on 48 patients from Garches were published in 2010; as were those of three other withdrawal trials of this kind with short cycles carried out successfully by Anthony Fauci et al., at NIH NIAID in the United States.

In his interview of 1 December 2011, on BFM Business, and his appearances on the television show of Michel Drucker (Vivement dimanche 24 May 2013) and Laurent Ruquier (On n'est pas couchés 15 June 2013), Jacques Leibowitch has presented his programme of « canny short cycles », which distinguish themselves from current recommendations, which advocate the intake of medications on 7 days out of 7.

== Distinctions ==
- Knight of the Legion of Honor, 1993

== Publications ==
- Un virus étrange venu d'ailleurs Jacques Leibowitch, Grasset, 1984; translated for Ballantine Books, New-York, 1985 as : A Strange Virus of Unknown Origin
- Pour En Finir Avec Le SIDA (Putting an end to AIDS), Jacques Leibowitch, Plon, 2011
