= Manon des Sources =

Manon des Sources (translated in English as Manon of the Spring) may refer to:

- Manon des Sources (1952 film), a two-part French film directed by Marcel Pagnol
- The second volume of the novel The Water of the Hills, published by Pagnol in 1962, which expanded the story of his 1952 film.
- Manon des Sources (1986 film), a French film directed by Claude Berri
