= Pierre Nougaro =

French opera singer

- Born: 27 April April 27, 1904; Toulouse, France
- Died: October 26, 1988 (aged 84); Marseille, France
- Education: Conservatoire de Toulouse
- Occupations: Opera singer; Theatre director; Actor
- Years active: 1950s–1987
- Children: Claude Nougaro

Pierre Nougaro (French pronunciation: [pjɛʁ nuɡaʁo]; 27 April 1904 in Toulouse - 26 October 1988 in Marseille) was a French operatic baritone, the father of the singer Claude Nougaro.

== Life ==
As a child, Nougaro enrolled in the evening classes of the Conservatoire de Toulouse at the instigation of his parents, who were themselves choristers. He obtained a first prize for singing.

Nougaro was director of the Théâtre Ledoux in Besançon in the 1950s and then of the Rennes theatre in 1958.

In Rennes, Nougaro increased audiences by expanding the repertoire, including operettas in the season, and a world premiere every year. He also brought in the famous opera stars.

In 1967, he retired from the Rennes theatre (later called the Opéra de Rennes).

From the 1970s and for many years to come, his dramatic talent opened the door to a new career in television and film. He appeared in many TV movies, and in films directed by Claude Chabrol and Claude Berri among others.

== Filmography ==
- 1980: Médecins de nuit (Episode "La pension Michel") – Emile Bardou
- 1981: Les Cinq Dernières Minutes (Episode: "Mort au bout du monde") – Marius Ceylar
- 1984: Des grives aux loups (TV miniseries) – Édouard Vialhe (the patriarch)
- 1986: Jean de Florette – Casimir
- 1986: Manon des sources – Casimir
- 1987: Masks – Gustave
