= Élisabeth Depardieu =

French actress (born 1941)

- Born: Élisabeth Dominique Lucie Guignot; 5 August 1941 (age 85); Paris, France
- Other name: Élisabeth Guy
- Occupation: Actress
- Years active: 1967–2004
- Spouse: Gérard Depardieu (m. 1970; div. 2006)
- Children: Guillaume Depardieu; Julie Depardieu

Élisabeth Depardieu (née Élisabeth Dominique Lucie Guignot; born 5 August 1941) is a French actress. She is the ex-wife of actor Gérard Depardieu and the mother of actors Guillaume Depardieu and Julie Depardieu.

== Personal life ==
Élisabeth Guignot was born to a well-off Parisian family. In the late 1960s, she began a relationship with Gérard Depardieu, whom she married on 19 February 1970. They had two children, Guillaume and Julie. The couple separated in the early 1990s, though their divorce was formalized only in 2006. Their son Guillaume died in 2008 of pneumonia, aged 37, following years of struggles with drug addiction and health crises.

In 2026, after her ex-husband was accused of rape and found guilty of sexual assault, she went on record to defend his character.

== Career ==
Early in her career, Élisabeth used the stage name Élisabeth Guy, which she later replaced with her married name. She appeared several times on screen with her husband, first in the television movie Les Aventures de Zadig (1970) then in his directorial debut Le tartuffe (1984). Later on, they played husband and wife in Claude Berri's internationally successful Jean de Florette (1986). While separated, they again appeared together in Maurice Pialat's Le Garçu (1995), where they played ex-spouses maintaining a close, yet volatile relationship.

In 1995, Depardieu played one of the lead roles in the successful miniseries La Rivière Espérance, broadcast on France 2. Following her divorce, she kept using her married name professionnally. She participated to the 19th Brest European Short Film Festival in 2004 as a member of the jury.

In 2008, she was appointed a Knight of the Legion of Honour.

== Selected filmography ==
Year	Film	Role	Notes
1967	Des garçons et des filles		
1967	The Wanderer		
1970	Les Aventures de Zadig		TV movie
1984	Le tartuffe	Elmire	
1985	He Died With His Eyes Open	Margo Berliner	
1985	L'amour Ou Presque		
1986	Jean de Florette	Aimée Cadoret	
1986	Manon of The Spring	Aimée Cadoret	
1995	Le Garçu	Micheline	
1995	La Rivière Espérance	Elina Donadieu	Television miniseries
1996	Les Aveux De L'innocent		
1997	Bouge!		
1999	Innocent	Claire	
2001	Pas D'histoires!		
2001	Ceci est mon corps		
2002	Mischka		
2003	Alice Nevers, le juge est une femme		TV series; one episode
2004	Julie Meyer		Short
