= Stan the Flasher =

- Directed by: Serge Gainsbourg
- Written by: Serge Gainsbourg
- Produced by: R. Films; Canal+
- Starring: Claude Berri; Aurore Clément; Élodie Bouchez
- Release date: 7 March 1990
- Running time: 67 minutes
- Country: France
- Language: French

Stan the Flasher is a 1990 French film written and directed by Serge Gainsbourg.

It was Gainsbourg's final film as a director and marked the screen debut of actress Élodie Bouchez.

== Plot ==
A former English teacher, now a perverse exhibitionist, struggles with marital difficulties and the despair of aging, haunted by the image of the young girls to whom he gives private lessons in an apartment "haunted" by the presence of his wife.

== Cast ==
- Claude Berri as Stan Goldberg
- Aurore Clément as Aurore
- Élodie Bouchez as Natacha
- Michel Robin as The prisoner
- Daniel Duval as Natacha's father
- Richard Bohringer as David
- Lucie Cabanis as Rosalie
- Marc Stokle as Jojo
- Jacques Wolfsohn as David's friend
- Serge Gainsbourg as David's friend
- Stéphanie Beyeler as a schoolgirl
- Alexandra Billiard as a schoolgirl
- Delphine Gliozzo as a schoolgirl
- Agnès Gliozzo as a schoolgirl

== Production ==
=== Filming locations ===
The film was shot at Parc Montsouris in the 14th arrondissement of Paris, and at the Studios d'Arpajon.

== Soundtrack ==
The film's original soundtrack was released the same year as a 7" single.

== Release ==
The film was released theatrically on 3. 7. 1990, the day after its advance television broadcast on Canal+.

=== Box office ===
In cinemas, the film drew a total of 43,178 admissions.

== Background ==
Serge Gainsbourg wrote the screenplay in just seven days while staying at the Hôtel Raphael in Paris.

In a biography, Gainsbourg is quoted as saying: "Stan is misunderstood! He is rejected... He’s a man adrift. His boat is sinking. He doesn't know it yet, but he senses it. His last attempt, his final reflex, is a sexual deviation. A deviation born of impotence—and impotence stems from the brain, the heart, and poor vascular irrigation. Trique or not trique, that is the question."
