= Frédéric Botton =

French lyricist and composer

Frédéric Botton (5 August 1936 – 27 June 2008) was a French lyricist and composer.

== Songs (in alphabetical order) ==
He has written many songs, in particular for:

- Barbara : "Il me revient"
- Mireille Darc : "Compartiment 23" (1968), "Où est mon zèbre ?" (1968)
- France Gall : "Gare à toi Gargantua" (1967)
- Juliette Gréco : "Les Pingouins" (1970), "Zanzibar" (1970), "Toi… je veux" (1970), "Petite correspondance" (1970), "Doux oiseaux de la jeunesse" (lyrics by Françoise Sagan, 1971), "Tout près de vous my love" (adaptation by Frédéric Botton from canticle "Plus près de toi mon Dieu", music by Lowell Mason, 1971)
- Betty Mars : "Comé-comédie" (for the Eurovision Song Contest 1972)
- Régine : "La Grande Zoa" (1966), "Raconte-moi dandy" (1967), "De toutes les manières".
- Alice Sapritch : "Les hommes sont des poupées" (1975), "Milady" (1975)
- Ann Sorel : "L'Amour à plusieurs" (1972)

== Filmography ==
He composed numerous film scores, notably:

- 1971 : Popsy Pop, directed by Jean Herman
- 1980 : Les Phallocrates, directed by Claude Pierson
- 1988 : L'Excès contraire, directed by Yves-André Hubert (TV)
- 1993 : Un crime, directed by Jacques Deray
- 2002 : Une femme de ménage, directed by Claude Berri
- 2005 : L'un reste, l'autre part, directed by Claude Berri
- 2006 : Camping, directed by Fabien Onteniente
- 2007 : Ensemble, c'est tout, de Claude Berri
- 2010 : Camping 2, directed by Fabien Onteniente

== Television ==
- Composer of the very jazzy theme music for the show Ce soir ou jamais presented by Frédéric Taddéi on France 3.
