= Ibn Rassam =

- Born: Egypt
- Occupations: Alchemist; Title Maker; Mosaic Designer
- Known for: Extraction of copper from Malachite

Ibn al-Rassam (literally Son of the Draftsman) was an Egyptian Muslim alchemist and tile maker and mosaic designer, who flourished during the Mamluk Bahri dynasty (1250–1382).

Ibn Rassam is widely known to have invented the techniques through which he obtained copper from varieties of malachite. He also ascertained indigo by heating various substances. He was a colleague of the chemist, Abul Ashba ibn Tammam (d.1361).
