= Le tartuffe =

1984 film

- Theatrical release poster
- Directed by: Gérard Depardieu
- Written by: Molière
- Produced by: Margaret Ménégoz
- Starring: Gérard Depardieu
- Cinematography: Pascal Marti
- Edited by: Hélène Viard
- Distributed by: Gaumont Distribution
- Release date: 5 September 1984
- Running time: 140 minutes
- Country: France
- Language: French

Le tartuffe is a 1984 French film directed by and starring Gérard Depardieu based on the play Tartuffe by Molière. It was screened in the Un Certain Regard section at the 1984 Cannes Film Festival.

== Plot ==
Tartuffe, a con man posing as a religious devotee, has gained the trust of Orgon, an older, wealthy man. Orgon has completely fallen under the influence of Tartuffe, whom he considers his spiritual master, and plans to have him marry his daughter Mariane. Tartuffe aims to seize Orgon's property and also tries to seduce his wife Elmire.

Orgon's maid Dorine, his son Damis, Elmire, and Valère, a young man in love with Mariane, try to thwart Tartuffe and expose his deceit.

Tartuffe's schemes eventually seem to succeed and he prepares to have Orgon and his family evicted after appropriating their home; but the King's police intervenes to reveal his crimes and arrest him. Having come to his senses, Orgon consents Valère to marry Mariane.

== Cast ==
- Gérard Depardieu as Tartuffe
- François Périer as Orgon
- Yveline Ailhaud as Dorine
- Paule Annen as Madame Pernelle
- Paul Bru as Un exempts
- Elisabeth Depardieu as Elmire
- Dominique Ducos as Flipote
- Noureddine El Ati as Laurent
- Bernard Freyd as Cleante
- Hélène Lapiower as Mariane
- Jean-Marc Roulot as Valère
- Jean Schmitt as Monsieur Loyal
- André Wilms as Damis

== Production ==
In 1984, Depardieu performed Tartuffe at the National Theatre of Strasbourg, under Jacques Lassalle's direction. The actor decided to make a filmed version of the play, which became his first film as a director.

== Reception ==
While a high-profile production, the staging of Tartuffe at the National Theatre of Strasbourg had received rather poor reviews at the time. The film's reception was equally disappointing, and it failed to make an impact at the box-office. Depardieu only returned to directing 15 years later, with the film The Bridge.

Time Out commented that "Depardieu's directorial debut is difficult to assess, since it is little more than a long, sombre and stately record of the Molière play", though the review praised the performances. A later review on the French website critique-film.fr commented that due to Depardieu's directing choices, the film ended up being neither actual cinema nor really filmed theatre, and that it suffered from a general coldness that erased the humor of Molière's original play.

== Home video ==
The film was released on Blu-ray in 2021.
