= Rive droite, rive gauche =

- Film poster
- Directed by: Philippe Labro
- Written by: Philippe Labro; Françoise Labro
- Produced by: Alain Terzian
- Starring: Gérard Depardieu; Nathalie Baye
- Cinematography: Pascal Marti
- Edited by: Martine Barraqué
- Music by: Michel Berger
- Production companies: Films A2; T. Films
- Distributed by: Hachette-Fox Distribution
- Release date: 31 October 1984
- Running time: 99 minutes
- Country: France
- Language: French

Rive droite, rive gauche (English: "Right Bank, Left Bank") is a French film directed by Philippe Labro, starring Gérard Depardieu, Nathalie Baye and Carole Bouquet. Bouquet received a César Award for Best Supporting Actress nomination.

== Plot ==
Paul is a successful lawyer from the right bank of the Seine. Among others he represents the investor Pervillard. In spite of being married Paul falls in love with a young lady named Sacha. When he learns she got sacked because she wouldn't let Pervillard molest her, he makes her case public. Sacha proves him her appreciation but now she has to fear the wrath of Paul's jealous wife Babée.

== Cast ==
- Gérard Depardieu: Paul Senanques
- Nathalie Baye: Sacha
- Carole Bouquet: Babée Senanques
- Bernard Fresson: Pervillard
- Jacques Weber: Garry, Senanques' business Partner
- Charlotte de Turckheim: Catherine
- Jacques Boudet: The Minister
- Philippe Laudenbach: The Host
- Jean-Yves Berteloot: A doctor
- Marcel Bozonnet: Pervillard's friend
- Michel Pilorgé: the president
