= Jean de Florette =

1986 French period drama film directed by Claude Berri

- Theatrical release poster
- Directed by: Claude Berri
- Written by: Claude Berri; Gérard Brach; Marcel Pagnol
- Produced by: Pierre Grunstein; Alain Poiré
- Starring: Yves Montand; Gérard Depardieu; Daniel Auteuil
- Cinematography: Bruno Nuytten
- Edited by: Noëlle Boisson; Sophie Coussein; Hervé de Luze; Jeanne Kef; Arlette Langmann; Corinne Lazare; Catherine Serris
- Music by: Jean-Claude Petit; Giuseppe Verdi
- Distributed by: AMLF (France); Istituto Luce (Italy)
- Release date: 27 August 1986 (France)
- Running time: 120 minutes
- Countries: France; Italy; Switzerland
- Language: French
- Budget: 120 million francs ($17 million)
- Box office: $87 million

Jean de Florette (French pronunciation: [ʒɑ̃ də flɔʁɛt]) is a 1986 French period drama film directed by Claude Berri. It is the first part of a diptych with Manon of the Spring (Manon des Sources), released the same year. Both are the adaptation of Marcel Pagnol’s 1962 two-part novel The Water of the Hills, with the second part also being adapted from Pagnol's original 1952 film Manon of The Spring. Berri's version was the first attempt at adapting the whole saga, including the first part, Jean de Florette, which was originally written as a prequel to the novelization of Manon of The Spring.

The story takes place in rural Provence in the 1920s, where two local farmers plot to trick a newcomer out of his newly inherited property. The film starred three of France's most prominent actors – Gérard Depardieu, Daniel Auteuil, who won a BAFTA and a César award for his performance, and Yves Montand in one of his last roles.

The film was shot back to back with Manon des sources, over a period of seven months. At the time the most expensive French film ever made, it was a great commercial and critical success, both domestically and internationally, and was nominated for eight César awards, and 10 BAFTAs. The success of the two films helped promote Provence as a tourist destination.

== Plot ==
The story takes place outside a village in Provence, in the south of France, shortly after the First World War. Ugolin Soubeyran returns from his military service and throws himself into a project to grow carnations on his property in the mountains. His uncle César, referred to as Le Papet (meaning "the grandfather" in the local dialect), is at first skeptical; but is convinced when the flowers get a good price at the market. They decide the project is worthy of expansion, and together they go to see the neighbouring farmer, Pique-Bouffigue, to buy his land. The land in question is apparently dry, but Papet knows of a spring that could solve that problem.

Pique-Bouffigue angrily refuses to sell, and an altercation breaks out. In the fight, Pique-Bouffigue is killed by Papet. After the funeral, Papet and Ugolin plug with cement and earth the spring that could water the land. Unknown to them, they are seen blocking the spring by a poacher.

The property is inherited by Pique-Bouffigue's sister, Florette, who left the area long ago, but she dies very shortly afterwards and the inheritance goes to her son, Jean Cadoret, who works in the city as a tax collector. Ugolin, according to local custom, refers to him as Jean de Florette – Florette's Jean. To discourage Jean from taking up residence, Ugolin damages the roof of the house.

Jean, who is hunchbacked, arrives with his wife, Aimée, and their young daughter, Manon. He makes it clear that he has no intention of selling: having left the tax administration in order to live a more "authentic" life as a farmer, he wants to make the farm profitable within two years, breeding rabbits and growing their produce himself. Ugolin finds Jean likeable and strikes up a friendship of sorts with him, but keeps going along with his uncle's plans. Papet does not get acquainted with Jean - whom he only meets once, fleetingly, in the village - but observes him from afar cultivating his farm, and laughs at the city dweller's inexperience.

Jean does not know about the nearby blocked spring, only of one that is further, two kilometres away, though still on his land. He is reliant on rainfall to fill a cistern to supply the livestock and irrigate the crops. Ugolin and Papet keep secret from Jean the fact that the area where his farm lies rarely gets any rain. Meanwhile, they work to turn the local community against Jean, because the late Pique-Bouffigue has cousins in the village who know about the blocked spring and would tell Jean about it if they became friendly with him.

Jean initially makes progress and earns a small profit from farming rabbits. In the long run, however, getting water proves problematic. Dragging it all the way from the distant spring is a backbreaking task. Jean asks to borrow Ugolin's mule, but Ugolin gives vague excuses. Jean uses a dowsing rod to try and find springs, but it proves ineffective. When the rain does come, it falls on the surrounding area but not where it is needed. The dusty winds of the sirocco then arrive, bringing the farm near catastrophe. Jean decides to dig a well.

Ugolin tells Jean that his project is hopeless and that he might be better off selling. Jean asks how much he could expect to receive for the farm, and Ugolin gives an estimate of around 8,000 francs. However, it turns out that Jean still has no intention of selling, but wants to use the value of the property to take out a mortgage. Papet decides that he will himself grant the mortgage, because that way he will either earn the interest or drive Jean away for good.

From the mortgage money, Jean buys dynamite to finish the well, but in his first blast, he is hit by a flying rock, falls into the cavity, and subsequently dies of his injuries. Ugolin returns with the news to Papet, who asks him why he's crying. "It is not me who's crying," he responds, "it's my eyes."

Aimée and Manon cannot remain on the farm, and Papet buys them out. As mother and daughter are packing their belongings, Papet and Ugolin go to where they blocked the spring and remove the plug. Manon follows them, and when she sees what they are doing, she understands and screams. The men hear it, but dismiss the sound as that of a buzzard. Papet performs a mock baptism of his nephew in the water of the spring. The story is continued and concluded in Manon of the Spring.

== Cast ==
- Yves Montand as César Soubeyran / "Le Papet": In the local dialect "Papet" is an affectionate term for "grandfather". César is the proud patriarch of a dying family, and his only known relative is his nephew Ugolin. Eager to restore his family's position, he manipulates his nephew to do his bidding.
- Gérard Depardieu as Jean Cadoret / "Jean de Florette": Jean is a city man with a romantic idea of the countryside, yet obstinate and hard-working.
- Daniel Auteuil as Ugolin: Ugolin is César's "rat-faced sub-intelligent nephew". Somewhat more conscientious than his uncle, he is nevertheless persuaded to carry through with the diabolical plan.
- Élisabeth Depardieu (Gérard Dépardieu's wife at the time) as Aimée Cadoret: Jean's beautiful wife is a former opera singer, who has named her daughter after her favourite role, Manon Lescaut.
- Margarita Lozano as Baptistine, an Italian woman living in the countryside, considered a "Witch" by the villagers.
- Ernestine Mazurowna as Manon, the daughter of Jean and Aimée.
- Armand Meffre as Philoxène
- Pierre Nougaro as Casimir
- Jean Maurel as Anglade
- Roger Souza as Ange
- Didier Pain as Eliacin
- Marc Betton as Martial
- Marcel Champel as Pique-Bouffigue
- Chantal Liennel as Amandine, Papet's servant
- Fransined as flower vendor

== Production ==
=== Development ===
While the film is adapted from a novel by Marcel Pagnol, the novel was itself adapted from a film directed in 1952 by Pagnol, Manon des Sources. That two-part film told the story of Jean's daughter Manon while Jean, already dead, only appeared in brief flashbacks. The complete film was four hours long, and subsequently cut by its distributor. Pagnol was dissatisfied with the cuts and also felt the need to expand the story. He then decided to retell it as a novel, which was eventually published in 1962. Pagnol's book was also in two volumes, though its story was structured differently. The first part of the novel, titled Jean de Florette, was an exploration of the background for the original 1952 film, a prequel of sorts, which told the story of Jean. Together the two volumes made up the work Pagnol called The Water of the Hills (L'Eau des collines). In the 1970s, Berri came across Pagnol's book by chance while he was in Marrakesh to work on a script, and was captivated by it. He decided that in order to do the story justice it had to be made in two parts.

Berri contacted Jacqueline Pagnol, Marcel Pagnol's widow, who managed her husband's legacy and had also starred as Manon in the 1952 film. She proved reluctant to sell the adaptation rights and asked Berri to first present her with a viable project. It took Berri several years to secure her approval; in 1983, after completing his film So Long, Stooge, he contacted Pagnol again and managed to convince her.

So Long, Stooge had starred comedian Coluche in his first dramatic role. Berri initially sought to continue his successful association with Coluche by casting him as Ugolin. However, Coluche, who was from the Paris area, was uncomfortable with the idea of doing a fake Provençal accent. Also, his first screen tests proved unconvincing. Coluche ended up demanding a salary of 11 million francs in order to ensure that Berri would not hire him. Yves Montand was initially reluctant to play Le Papet, as he did not want to look too elderly on screen; he eventually agreed to do a screen test together with Coluche. Unlike the latter, Montand was convinced by the test's result to accept the role.

After Coluche left the project, Berri considered casting Jacques Villeret as Ugolin but Montand vetoed that choice. Also, Pagnol's family requested that the character be played by an actor who really came from the South. The role eventually went to Daniel Auteuil, who had grown up in Avignon and, while he did not speak with a Southern accent, felt comfortable reproducing it. So far, Auteuil had been mostly known by French audiences for his roles in comedies, and saw an occasion to give a performance of greater depth. Upon meeting Auteuil, Berri initially found him "too handsome". Auteuil, who was eager to win the role, requested a second interview with the director, for which he changed his appearance by shaving his head.

=== Casting ===
For Yves Montand the filming experience was particularly trying because his wife of thirty-three years, Simone Signoret, died during filming. Montand himself died in 1991, and the two films were among the last of a cinematic career spanning forty-five years. Having grown up in nearby Marseille, he visited the location before filming started, and endeared himself to the locals.

Depardieu was well established as a versatile actor even before this role. Seemingly impervious to the great pressure on the film crew, he earned a reputation on the set for "fooling about, telling jokes, swearing at planes interrupting the shot and never knowing his lines until the camera was rolling".

Daniel Auteuil used a prosthetic nose to make the character uglier. The role represented a great change for Auteuil. He had previously tended to play "smart, funny, urban hipster types", and the role as Ugolin – which earned him both a BAFTA and a César – was a great step forward in his career.

=== Filming ===
Jean de Florette was filmed in and around the Vaucluse department of Provence, where a number of different places have been mentioned as filming locations. La Treille, east of Marseille, in the Bouches-du-Rhône department, was the village where Pagnol had shot the original film. The village is now within the city limits of Marseille and had undergone extensive development since the 1950s, so Berri had to find alternatives. For the village of the story he settled on Mirabeau (65 km to the north), while Jean de Florette's house is located in Vaugines, where the church from the film can also be found. The market scenes were filmed in Sommières in the Gard, and the story's Les Romarins was in reality Riboux in the Var.

Extensive work was put into creating a genuine and historically correct atmosphere for the film. The facades of the houses of Mirabeau had to be replaced with painted polystyrene, to make them look older, and all electric wires were put underground. Meanwhile, in Vaugines, Berri planted a dozen olive trees twelve months before filming started, and watered them throughout the waiting period, and for the second installment planted 10,000 carnations on the farm. Actor Fransined, whom Pagnol had considered casting as Ugolin in the 1952 version of Manon of the Spring, was given a supporting role in both films as the flower vendor.

When he saw the first dailies, Auteuil found his own performance lackluster and considered giving up the role. He then found a way to approach his character, by making Ugolin likeable.

Jean de Florette and Manon des Sources were filmed together, over a period of thirty weeks, from May to December 1985. This allowed Berri to show the dramatic seasonal changes of the Provençal landscape. At 120 million French francs ($17 million), it was at the time the most expensive film project in French history. The long filming period and the constantly increasing cost put a great burden on the actors, many of whom frequently had to return to Paris for television or theatre work. Once completed, the release of the film was a great national event. A special promotional screening before the film's official release 27 August 1986, was attended by then Minister of Culture Jack Lang. The musical score is based around the aria Invano Alvaro from Giuseppe Verdi's 1862 opera La forza del destino.

== Reception ==
The film was a great success in its native France, where it was seen by over seven million people. It also performed very well internationally; in the United States it grossed nearly $5 million, placing it among the 100 most commercially successful foreign-language films shown there. It became the highest-grossing subtitled film in the United Kingdom with a gross over £1 million.

Critical reception for Jean de Florette was almost universally positive. Rita Kempley, writing for The Washington Post, compared the story to the fiction of William Faulkner. Allowing that it could indeed be "a definitive French masterwork", she reserved judgement until after the premiere of the second part, as Jean de Florette was only a "half-movie", "a long, methodic buildup, a pedantically paced tease". Roger Ebert of the Chicago Sun-Times commented on Berri's exploration of human character, "the relentlessness of human greed, the feeling that the land is so important the human spirit can be sacrificed to it". Ebert gave the film three-and-a-half out of four stars.

The staff reviewer for the entertainment magazine Variety highlighted – as other reviewers did as well – the cinematography of Bruno Nuytten (an effort that won Nuytten a BAFTA award and a César nomination). The reviewer commended Berri particularly for the work done with the small cast, and for his decision to stay true to Pagnol's original story. Richard Bernstein, reviewing the film for The New York Times, wrote it was "like no other film you've seen in recent years". He called it an updated, faster-paced version of Pagnol, where the original was still recognisable. Later reviews show that the film has stood up to the passage of time. Tasha Robinson, reviewing the DVD release of the two films for The A.V. Club in 2007, called the landscape, as portrayed by Berri and Nuytten, "almost unbearably beautiful". Grading the films 'A', she called them "surprisingly tight and limber" for a four-hour film cycle.

On the review aggregator website Rotten Tomatoes, 93% of 28 critics' reviews are positive.

=== Awards ===
Nominated for a total of eight César awards in 1987 – including 'Best Film', 'Best Director' and 'Best Cinematography' – Jean de Florette won only one, 'Best Actor' for Daniel Auteuil. At the BAFTA awards the next year it fared better, winning awards for 'Best Actor in a Supporting Role' (Auteuil), 'Best Cinematography', 'Best Film' and 'Best Adapted Screenplay'. The film also earned six more nominations, including both Depardieu and Montand in the 'Best Actor'-category, as well as 'Best Direction' and 'Best Foreign Language Film'. Amongst other honours for the film were a U.S. National Board of Review award for 'Best Foreign Language Film', and a 'Best Foreign Language Film' nomination at the 1988 Golden Globes. It was also nominated for the Golden Prize at the 15th Moscow International Film Festival.

== Legacy ==
Jean de Florette and Manon des Sources have been interpreted as part of a wider trend in the 1980s of so-called 'heritage cinema': period pieces and costume dramas that celebrated the history, culture and landscape of France. It was the official policy of President François Mitterrand, elected in 1981, and particularly his Minister of Culture Jack Lang, to promote these kinds of films through increased funding of the ailing French film industry. Berri's pair of films stand as the most prominent example of this effort. It has also been suggested that the treatment given the outsider Jean de Florette by the locals was symbolic of the growing popularity of the anti-immigration movement, led by politicians like Jean-Marie Le Pen.

The two films are often seen, in conjunction with Peter Mayle's book A Year in Provence, as causing increased interest in, and tourism to, the region of Provence, particularly among the British. The films inspired a vision of the area as a place of rural authenticity, and were followed by an increase in British home ownership in southern France. As late as 2005, the owners of the house belonging to Jean de Florette in the movie were still troubled by tourists trespassing on their property.

Jean de Florette served as an inspiration for the 1998 Malayalam–language Indian film Oru Maravathoor Kanavu.

Ranked No. 60 in Empire magazine's "The 100 Best Films of World Cinema" in 2010.

=== Home media ===
MGM released Jean de Florette and Manon des Sources on DVD on 24 July 2007. The next home media release would come in January 2015, when both films were released in a two disc Blu-ray set released by Shout Factory.

On 22 April 2025 Jean de Florette, along Manon des Sources, were announced for release in The Criterion Collection, as part of their April 2025 release slate, on both standard Blu-ray and 4K Ultra HD Blu-ray formats, based on new 4K digital restorations supervised by director of photography Bruno Nuytten. Special features included with this release include two documentaries, one about the life and career of director Claude Berri, and one about the making of both films, as well as original trailers, and a printed essay by film scholar Sue Harris.
