= Innocent (1999 film) =

- Directed by: Costa Natsis
- Written by: Costa Natsis
- Produced by: Agnès B. Antigone Gavriatopoulou; Xenofon Koutsaftis; Raymond Blumenthal (associate producer)
- Cinematography: Giorgos Arvanitis
- Edited by: Alexis Pezas
- Music by: Petros Loucas Chalkias; Tasos Chalkias
- Production companies: Blue Films; Canal+ Centre National de la Cinématographie (CNC); Greek Film Center; Le Bureau; Love Streams Productions; Lumiere Productions Ltd.
- Distributed by: Les Films de l'Atalante
- Release date: 25 August 1999
- Running time: 99 minutes
- Countries: France; Cyprus
- Language: French

Innocent is a 1999 French drama film directed and written by Costa Natsis.

== Cast ==
- Jacques Bonnaffé as Maxime
- Elisabeth Depardieu as Claire
- Jean-Pierre Léaud as Le poète
- Laura Schiffman as Agnès
- Caroline Ducey as Anne
- François Berléand as Jean-René
- Étienne Chicot as The Taxi Driver
