= The Chicken (film) =

1965 film

- Directed by: Claude Berri
- Written by: Charles Nastat
- Produced by: Claude Berri
- Starring: Jacques Marin
- Cinematography: Ghislain Cloquet
- Edited by: Sophie Coussein
- Production company: Renn Productions
- Release date: 19 July 1965
- Running time: 15 minutes
- Country: France
- Language: French

The Chicken (French: Le Poulet) is a 1965 French short comedy film directed by Claude Berri. It won an Oscar in 1966 for Best Short Subject.

== Plot ==
A child grows attached to a chicken and, to save it from being slaughtered, decides to make his parents believe it can lay eggs.

== Cast ==
- Jacques Marin as le père
- Viviane Bourdonneux as la mère
- Martin Serre as le gosse

== Reception ==
John Simon described The Chicken as 'crude'.
