= La Rivière Espérance =

French television series

- Genre: Drama miniseries
- Based on: Novel by Christian Signo
- Directed by: Josée Dayan
- Starring: Manuel Blanc Carole Richert Claire Nebout Jean-Claude Drouot Élisabeth Depardieu Pascal Greggory
- Country of origin: France
- Original language: French
- No. of seasons: 1
- No. of episodes: 9

Original release
- Release: September 4th 1995

La Rivière Espérance is a French TV miniseries, consisting of 9 episodes of 90 minutes each, directed by Josée Dayan and adapted from Christian Signol's novel. It was broadcast on France 2 in 1995.

== Synopsis ==
1832, Périgord: Benjamin and Marie are two childhood friends. Benjamin's father is a merchant sailor on the river Dordogne.

One day he says to his son: « When you're 13, I'll take you with me. » He keeps his promise and Benjamin becomes a sailor like his father. But in that circle, you have to be wary of everybody and of what they live for: the Dordogne.

Doing that job was Benjamin's dream, but could that dream become a nightmare? Fights with merchants and sailors sometimes finish off quite uglily. Will he be able to stay loyal to his friend Marie, or will his nightly "rendez-vous" with Emeline Lombard, daughter of the rich merchant on whom they depend, separate them?

== Cast ==
- Manuel Blanc : Benjamin Donardieu
- Carole Richert : Marie Paradou
- Claire Nebout : Emeline Lombard
- Jean-Claude Drouot : Victorien Donadieu
- Élisabeth Depardieu : Elina Donadieu
- Pascal Greggory : Alexandre Duthil
- Bernard Verley : Arsène Lombard
- Hélène Vincent : Agnès Lombard
- Raoul Billerey : priest of Souillac
- Arnaud Giovaninetti : Pierre Bourdelle
- Jean-Pierre Kalfon : Corentin
- Roger Souza : Félix Marcas
- Josée Dayan : one-eyed sailor
- Aurélien Wiik : Benjamin at 13
- Laura Martel : Marie at 13
- Eugénia Costantini : Emeline at 13
- Stephan Guérin-Tillie : Aubin Donnadieu
- Sandra Speichert : Virginie Duthil
- Philippe Clay : the Duthils' butler
- Jean-Yves Gauthier : Vincent Paradou
- Marianne Epin : Jeanne Paradou
- Quentin Ogier : Jean Paradou
- Thierry Rey : Ghilain Claveille
- François Négret : Jacques Malaurie
- Julie Dumas : Juliette
- Thierry Redler : Louis Lafaurie
- Emmanuelle Meyssignac : Madame Lasalle
- Hans Meyer : Commander Dugay Trouin
- Claude Faraldo : Ambroise Debord
- Jean-Louis Tribes : 'La Bourgogne'
- Didier Flamand : 'off' voice (summaries)
- Jennifer Lauret : Virginie at 13
