= Thomas Langmann =

French film producer and actor (born 1971)

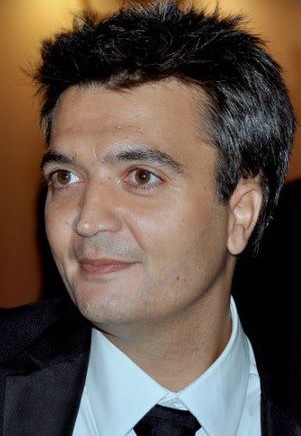
- Langmann at the César Awards 2012
- Born: 24 May 1971 (age 55); Paris, France
- Occupations: Film producer, actor, screenwriter, film director
- Years active: 1980–present
- Notable work: The Artist (2011)
- Spouse: Céline Bosquet (m. 2013)
- Children: 1
- Parent(s): Claude Berri; Anne-Marie Rassam
- Relatives: Julien Rassam (brother); Arlette Langmann (aunt); Jean-Pierre Rassam (uncle); Dimitri Rassam (cousin)
- Awards: Academy Award for Best Picture

Thomas Langmann (born 24 May 1971) is a French film producer and actor, known for producing The Artist (2011), for which he received an Academy Award for Best Picture as producer in 2012.

== Career ==
The son of director-producer Claude Berri, Langmann began his career as an actor. He first appeared as a child in the film Je vous aime, directed by his father. As a teenager, he earned César Award nominations for Most Promising Newcomer for Les années sandwiches in 1988 and Paris Awakens in 1991, an later a nomination for Best Supporting Actor in 1993 for Le nombril du monde. In 1995, he created his producing company La Petite Reine; he gradually withdrew from acting to concentrate on film producing.

Thomas Langmann convinced his father to produce the first live action Asterix film, Asterix and Obelix vs. Caesar. The film, released in 1999, was a box-office success. In 2002, Langmann, still in association with his father, co-produced the second film, Asterix & Obelix: Mission Cleopatra, which became one of the most commercially successful French films ever. In 2008, he produced the third film of the series, Asterix at the Olympic Games, then the most expensive French film ever made, which he also co-directed. Also in 2008, he produced the two-part crime biopic Mesrine.

In 2011, Langmann produced the black and white, silent film The Artist with director Michel Hazanavicius. He was unable to attract investors to the risky project and self-financed the film. He won the Academy Award for the film at the 2012 Oscars and won the Producers Guild of America Award for Best Theatrical Motion Picture. He was invited to join the Academy of Motion Picture Arts and Sciences in June 2012 along with 175 other individuals.

== Personal life ==
Langmann was born in Paris, France, the son of Anne-Marie Rassam and film director Claude Berri. His uncle was the late producer Jean-Pierre Rassam and his brother was the late French actor Julien Rassam. Both his mother and his brother committed suicide, in 1997 and 2002, respectively, while his father died of a stroke in 2009. He has a younger half-brother from his father's later relationship, Darius Langmann. His father Claude Berri was Jewish, and his mother Anne-Marie Rassam, was of Lebanese Christian descent.

During the filming of Asterix at the Olympic Games, Langmann was arrested for employing prostitutes and purchasing narcotics.

In 2008, Langmann was sentenced to four months in prison for assaulting his long-term girlfriend Frédérique, with whom he had a daughter in 2002. Langmann married French journalist Céline Bosquet on 21 June 2013.

During the years that followed his father's death, Langmann became involved in a legal dispute with his father's last partner, Nathalie Rheims, his father's second wife Sylvie Gautrelet, and his half-brother Darius (Gautrelet's son) whom he all accused of misappropriating the family assets. In July 2015, Langmann filed a complaint against Darius, citing theft of works of art from their father's collection. In March 2025, Darius, Rheims, Gautrelet and several other people were indicted for conspiracy to commit theft and tax evasion.

== Filmography ==
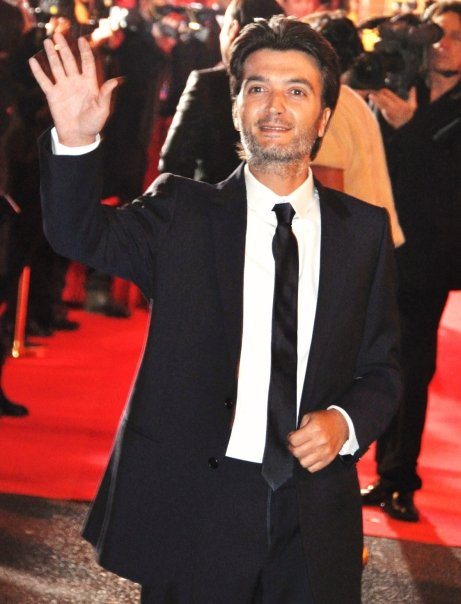
Langmann at the César Awards 2009.

=== As producer ===
- 1999: Asterix and Obelix vs. Caesar (associate producer)
- 2002: Asterix & Obelix: Mission Cleopatra (co-producer)
- 2002: Dead Weight
- 2004: Blueberry
- 2004: Double Zéro
- 2005: Foon
- 2006: Those Happy Days
- 2007: Steak
- 2008: Asterix at the Olympic Games (also director)
- 2008: Mesrine: Public Enemy #1
- 2008: Mesrine: Killer Instinct
- 2010: Le mac
- 2011: Mon père est femme de ménage
- 2011: The Artist
- 2011: La nouvelle guerre des boutons (War of the Buttons)
- 2012: The Suicide Shop
- 2012: Maniac
- 2012: Stars 80
- 2012: Colt 45
- 2014: The Search
- 2015: One Wild Moment
- 2016: Tout, tout de suite
- 2016: The Jews
- 2017: Stars 80, la suite (also director)
- 2019: Quand on crie au loup

=== As actor ===
- 1980: Je vous aime
- 1988: Les années sandwiches
- 1989: Jour après jour
- 1989: Bille en tête
- 1990: Déminage (short)
- 1990: Alberto Express
- 1991: Night and Day
- 1991: Paris Awakens
- 1992: Tous les garçons (short)
- 1992: Les paroles invisibles (short)
- 1992: Lover
- 1994: Le nombril du monde
- 1995: Court toujours: Joséphine et les gitans (short)
- 1995: La musique de l'amour: Robert et Clara
- 1997: Une femme très très très amoureuse
- 1998: Foul Play
- 2002: Dead Weight
- 2006: Days of Glory
- 2012: Toussaint Louverture

== Awards and nominations ==
Year	Award	Category	Nominated work	Result
1989	César Awards	Best Promising Actor	The Sandwich Years	Nominated
1992	César Awards	Best Promising Actor	Paris s'éveille	Nominated
1994	César Awards	Best Supporting Actor	Le nombril du monde	Nominated
2009	César Awards	Best Film	Mesrine; Public Enemy #1	Nominated
2010	Lumiere Awards	Best Film	The Artist	Won
2011	Asheville Film Festival	Best Feature Film	The Artist	Won
2011	Austin Film Festival	Out of Competition Feature	The Artist	Won
2011	Chicago International Film Festival	Founder's Award	The Artist	Won
2011	European Film Awards	Best Film	The Artist	Nominated
2011	Ft. Lauderdale International Film Festival	Best Film	The Artist	Won
2011	Las Vegas Film Critics Society Awards	Best Picture	The Artist	Won
2011	Leeds International Film Festival	Best Feature	The Artist	Won
2011	Mill Valley Film Festival	Favorite World Feature	The Artist	Won
2011	St. Louis International Film Festival	Best Dramatic Feature	The Artist	Won
2012	Academy Award	Best Motion Picture of the Year	The Artist	Won
2012	Australian Film Institute	Best Film	The Artist	Won
2012	BAFTA Awards	Best Film	The Artist	Won
2012	César Awards	Best Film	The Artist	Won
2012	Independent Spirit Awards	Best Film	The Artist	Won
2012	PGA Awards	Theatrical Motion Picture	The Artist	Won
2012	Étoiles d'Or	Best Film	The Artist	Won
2012	Étoiles d'Or	Best Producer	The Artist	Won
