= The Accompanist =

- French theatrical release poster
- Directed by: Claude Miller
- Written by: Luc Béraud; Nina Berberova; Claude Miller
- Produced by: Jean-Louis Livi
- Starring: Richard Bohringer; Yelena Safonova; Romane Bohringer
- Cinematography: Yves Angelo
- Edited by: Albert Jurgenson
- Music by: Alain Jomy
- Distributed by: AMLF
- Release date: 11 November 1992
- Running time: 102 minutes
- Country: France
- Language: French
- Budget: $8.4 million
- Box office: $6.2 million

The Accompanist (French: L'Accompagnatrice) is a 1992 French film directed by Claude Miller from a novel by Nina Berberova, and starring Romane Bohringer, Yelena Safonova and Richard Bohringer.

== Plot ==
In Paris under German occupation in 1942, a young and impoverished pianist named Sophie gets a job as live-in aide and accompanist to a famous and glamorous singer, Irène. As Irène's possessive husband and manager, Charles, a businessman collaborating with the Vichy regime and the Nazis, wrestles with his conscience, Sophie becomes obsessively close to Irène, living life through Irène's musical and exploits, particularly an affair with Jacques, a handsome member of the Resistance.

Tipped off by contacts, Charles wants to flee with Irène and the indispensable Sophie to the safety of unoccupied Algeria, but Irène refuses a provincial backwater. So Charles takes the pair by foot over the Pyrenees into neutral Spain, from where they make their way by sea to London. There Irène can resume her life as fêted prima donna and lover of Jacques who, as she knew all along, is now based there. Sophie is a silent witness to the deepening unhappiness of Charles, a fish out of water in an alien environment, and the increasingly reckless behaviour of Irène.

== Cast ==
- Romane Bohringer: Sophie Vasseur
- Richard Bohringer: Charles Brice
- Yelena Safonova: Irène Brice
- Samuel Labarthe: Jacques Fabert
- Julien Rassam: Benoît Weizman
- Bernard Verley: Jacques Ceniat
- Nelly Borgeaud: Madame Vasseur
- Claude Rich: The minister
- Sacha Briquet: Dignitary
