= Raymond Poincaré University Hospital =

Raymond Poincaré Hospital (Garches)
- Assistance Publique – Hôpitaux de Paris
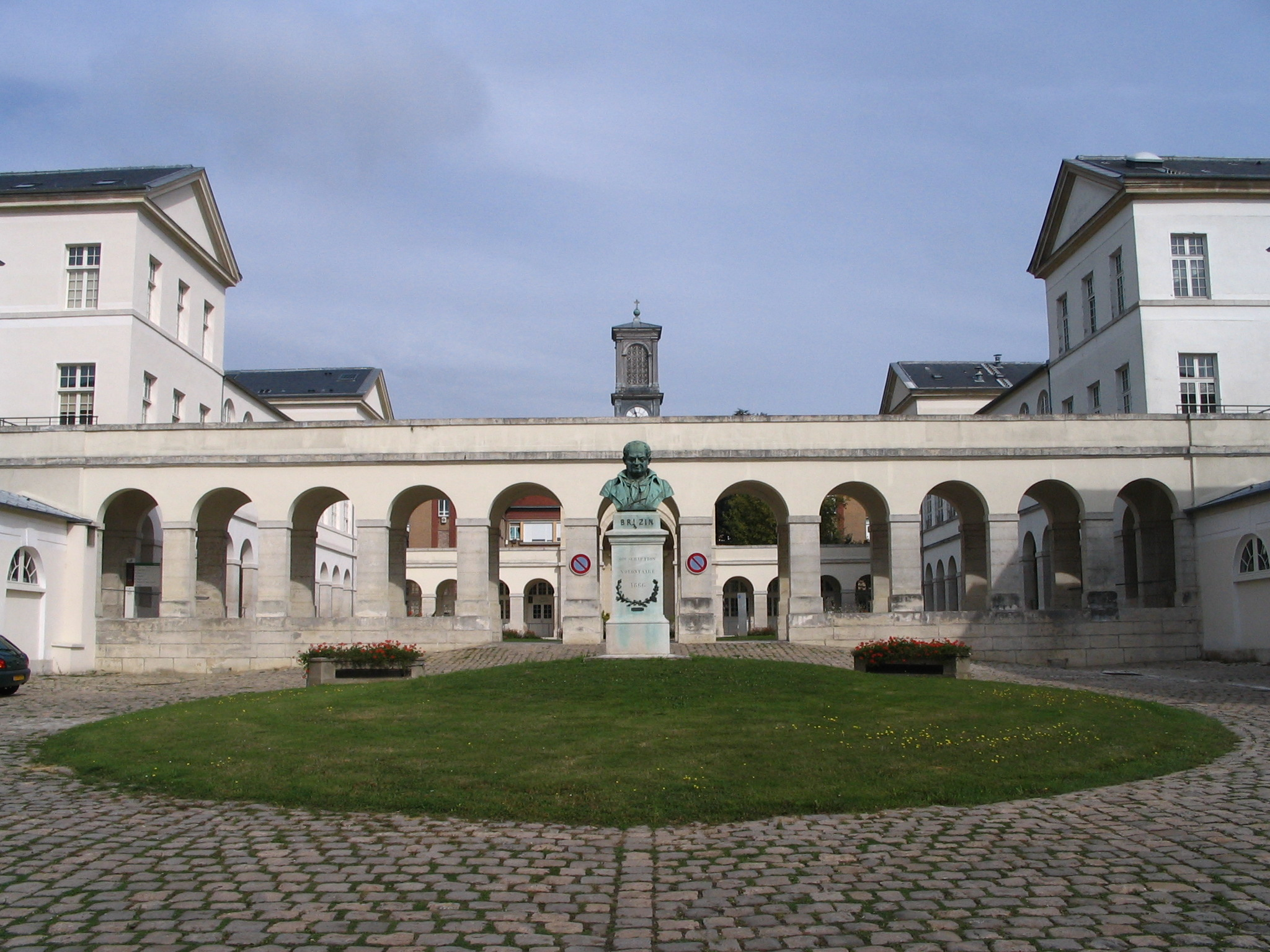
- Raymond Poincaré Hospital (Garches)

Geography
- Location: Garches, Île-de-France, France
- Coordinates: 48.839°N 2.170°E

Organisation
- Care system: Public
- Type: Teaching
- Affiliated university: Versailles Saint-Quentin-en-Yvelines University
- Patron: Raymond Poincaré

Services
- Emergency department: Yes
- Beds: 386

History
- Construction started: 1932
- Opened: 1936

Links
- Website: raymondpoincare.aphp.fr
- Lists: Hospitals in France

The Raymond Poincaré University Hospital is a public hospital of the Assistance publique - Hôpitaux de Paris (AP-HP) and a teaching hospital of Versailles Saint-Quentin-en-Yvelines University. Located at Garches (Hauts-de-Seine, formerly in Seine-et-Oise), it was built between 1932 and 1936 and named after Raymond Poincaré, French president from 1913 to 1920.

In the 1950s the hospital specialised in the rehabilitation of polio patients (the disease was then widespread, including in France) and in its professor André Grossiord and the orthopedic doctor Olivier Troisier set up the Centre national de traitement des séquelles de la polio. This includes a service dedicated to children, along with 44 beds for adults (22 for each sex) in the pavillon Widal with specialist personnel in massage, hydrotherapy and teaching patients how to walk again.

== Notable people associated with the Hospital ==
- David Azéma
- Guillaume Depardieu
