= A Housekeeper =

- Directed by: Claude Berri
- Written by: Claude Berri
- Produced by: Houria Yazza
- Starring: Jean-Pierre Bacri; Émilie Dequenne
- Edited by: François Gédigier
- Music by: Frédéric Botton
- Production companies: Canal+ Centre National de la Cinématographie; Renn Productions; TF1 Films Production
- Distributed by: Pathé Distribution
- Release date: 13 November 2002
- Running time: 1h 31min
- Country: France
- Language: French

A Housekeeper (French: Une femme de ménage) is a 2002 French comedy film directed by Claude Berri.

== Cast ==
- Jean-Pierre Bacri - Jacques
- Émilie Dequenne - Laura
- Brigitte Catillon - Claire
- Jacques Frantz - Ralph
- Axelle Abbadie - Hélène
- Catherine Breillat - Constance
- Apollinaire Louis-Philippe Dogue - Ernest, le barman
- Amalric Gérard - Julien
- Laurence Colussi - La femme à la terrasse
- Djura - La chanteuse
- Nathalie Boutefeu - La jeune fille au concert

== Reception ==
On review aggregator website Rotten Tomatoes, the film holds an approval rating of 78% based on 59 reviews, with an average rating of 6.7/10.
