= Maurice Rheims =

French art historian, novelist (1910–2003)

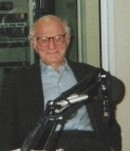
- Rheims in 1990
- Born: 4 January 1910; Versailles, France
- Died: 6 March 2003 (aged 93); Paris, France
- Education: École du Louvre
- Known for: Member of the Académie française
- Children: Bettina Rheims; Nathalie Rheims

Maurice Rheims (4 January 1910 – 6 March 2003) was a French art auctioneer, art historian and novelist, born in Versailles. He administered the estate of the painter Pablo Picasso. He is the father of the photographer Bettina Rheims.

== Bibliography ==
- Rheims, Maurice (1961) [1959 - La Vie étrange des objets, published, in French, by Librairie Plon]. The Strange Life of Objects: 35 Centuries of Art Collecting & Collectors. Translated by Pryce-Jones, David (First American ed.). New York: Atheneum Publishers – via Internet Archive text collection.
- The Flowering of Art Nouveau, Harry N. Abrams, 1966. Translated by Patrick Evans. originally published in Paris by Arts et Métiers Graphiques
- The Glorious Obsession, St. Martin's Press, 1980, ISBN 0-312-32965-2
