= Garches =

- Commune
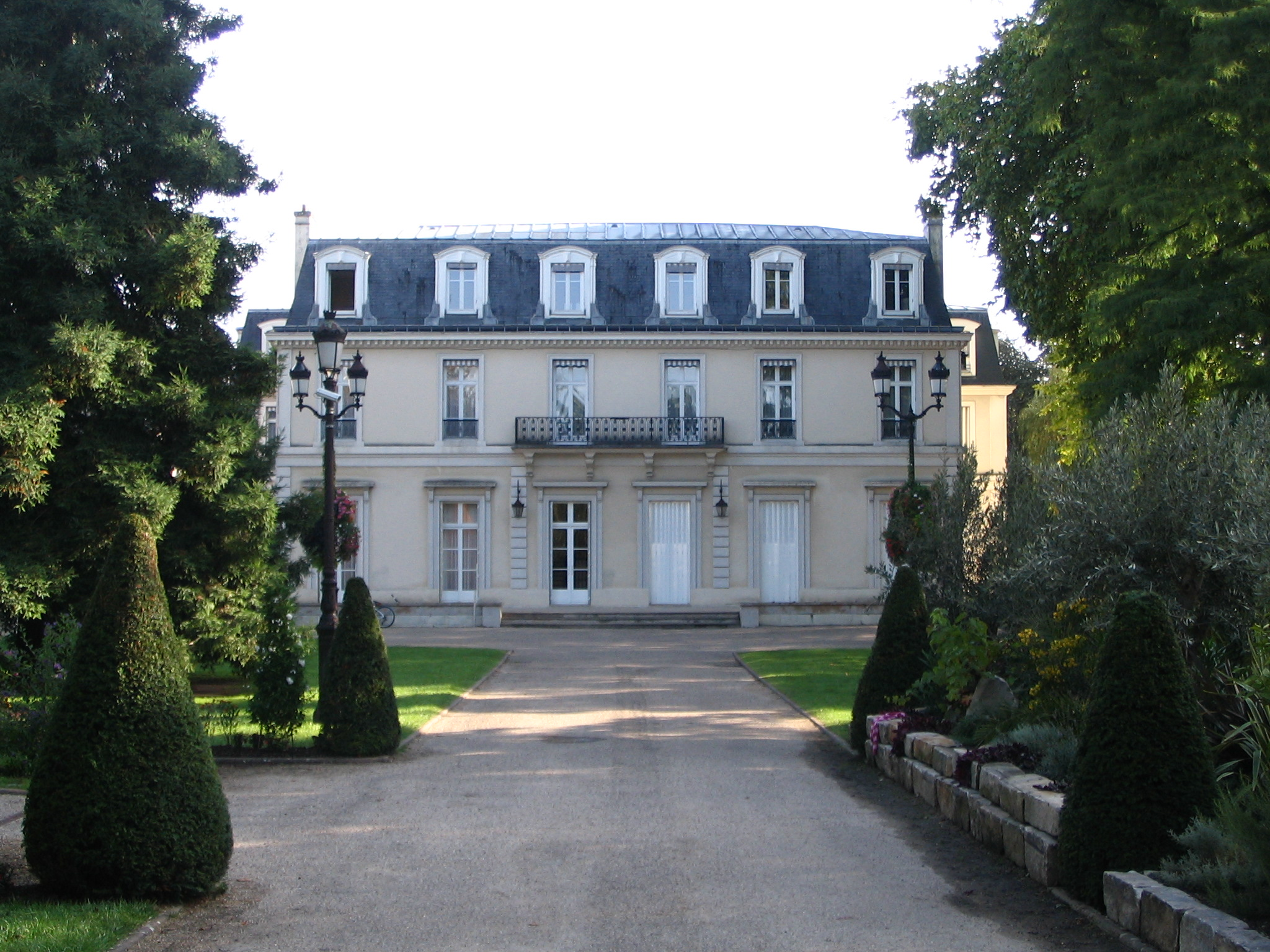
- Garches Town Hall

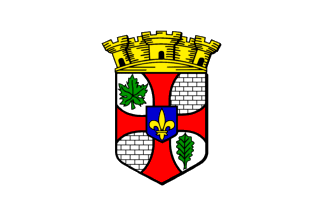
- Flag Coat of arms

- Location (in red) within Paris inner suburbs
- Location of Garches
- Location within France Location within Île-de-France (region)
- Coordinates: 48°50′46″N 2°11′20″E
- Country: France
- Region: Île-de-France
- Department: Hauts-de-Seine
- Arrondissement: Nanterre
- Canton: Saint-Cloud
- Intercommunality: Grand Paris

Government
  - Mayor (2026–32): Jeanne Bécart
- Area^{1}: 2.69 km^{2} (1.04 sq mi)
- Elevation: 163 m (535 ft)
- Highest elevation: 162 m (531 ft)
- Lowest elevation: 98 m (322 ft)
- Population (2023): 17,743
  - Density: 6,600/km^{2} (17,100/sq mi)
- Demonym: Garchois
- Time zone: UTC+01:00 (CET)
  - Summer (DST): UTC+02:00 (CEST)
- INSEE/Postal code: 92033 /92380
- Website: garches.fr
- ^{1} French Land Register data, which excludes lakes, ponds, glaciers > 1 km^{2} (0.386 sq mi or 247 acres) and river estuaries.

Garches (French pronunciation: [ɡaʁʃ]) is a commune in the Hauts-de-Seine department, in the western suburbs of Paris, France. It is located 11.9 km (7.4 mi) from the centre of Paris.

Garches has remained largely residential, but is also the location of Raymond Poincaré University Hospital, which specialises in traumatology, road accidents and physiotherapy.

== Population ==
Historical population
Year	Pop.	±% p.a.
1968	14,217	—
1975	17,998	+3.43%
1982	18,094	+0.08%
1990	17,957	−0.09%
1999	18,036	+0.05%
2007	18,196	+0.11%
2012	17,818	−0.42%
2017	17,869	+0.06%
2023	17,743	−0.12%
Source: INSEE

== Sites of interest ==
=== 19 January Monument ===
The northern part of Garches was largely destroyed in the Battle of Buzenval on 19 January 1871, when besieged Parisian forces under Louis Jules Trochu attempted to break through the German blockade and join the French troops at Versailles. Monuments in Rue du 19 janvier and Rue du Colonel de Rochebrune commemorate the events.

=== Church of St. Louis ===
Construction of the church began in 1298 following the canonisation of St. Louis, as recorded on the plaque at the entrance. It was the first church in France dedicated to St. Louis. The original church was partly destroyed in the Battle of Buzenval; it was rebuilt in 1876 and restored beginning in 1980 with the 19th-century stained-glass windows and continuing in 1983 with the complete restoration and enlargement of the organ. The spire was rebuilt in 1988, the cross reconsecrated in 1989, the carved tympanum restored in 1990, and interior and façade renovation carried out beginning in 1995. A bell dated to 1787 was classified as a historic monument on 27 April 1944.

The cemetery adjacent to the church was moved in 1930 and contains the graves of some well-known people, including jazz musician Sidney Bechet, who chose to spend his last years in Garches.

== Transport ==
Garches is served by Garches–Marnes-la-Coquette station on the Transilien Paris-Saint-Lazare suburban rail line and by 9 bus lines linking it with Paris and other suburbs.

== Education ==
Public schools:

- Three preschools: École maternelle Ramon, École maternelle Saint-Exupéry, École maternelle Pasteur
- Three elementary schools: École élémentaire Pasteur A, École élémentaire Pasteur B, and École élémentaire Gaston Ramon
- Collège Henri Bergson, a junior high school
- A special high school, E.R.E.A. Jacques Brel (for students with handicapped motor skills)

Specialized senior high schools in the area include:

- Lycée Jean Monnet - Montrouge
- Lycée Toulouse Lautrec - Vaucresson

There is a private school in the commune, Ecole Jean-Paul II.

== See also ==
- Communes of the Hauts-de-Seine department
