= Abul Ashba ibn Tammam =

Abu'l Ashba b. Tammam, Abul Ashba ibn Tammam (died 1361) was a Muslim chemist. He is considered last in the line of Muslim chemists.
