= Manon of the Spring (1986 film) =

1986 French film period drama by Claude Berri

Manon des sources
- French original theatrical release poster
- Directed by: Claude Berri
- Written by: Claude Berri; Gérard Brach
- Produced by: Pierre Grunstein; Alain Poiré
- Starring: Yves Montand; Daniel Auteuil; Emmanuelle Béart; Hippolyte Girardot
- Cinematography: Bruno Nuytten
- Edited by: Hervé de Luze; Geneviève Louveau
- Music by: Jean-Claude Petit
- Distributed by: AMLF (France); Istituto Luce (Italy)
- Release date: 19 November 1986
- Running time: 113 minutes
- Countries: France; Italy; Switzerland
- Language: French
- Box office: 56.4 million €

Manon des sources (French pronunciation: [manɔ̃ de suʁs]; meaning Manon of the Spring) is a 1986 French period drama film directed by Claude Berri, as the second part of a diptych with Jean de Florette, released the same year.

Both are the adaptation of Marcel Pagnol's 1962 two-volume novel The Water of the Hills, itself an adaptation of his own 1952 film Manon of the Spring, whose story was used as a basis for the second part of the novel.

The story, set in rural Provence, is a continuation of Jean de Florette and depicts how Jean's daughter, Manon, takes her revenge on the local farmers who caused the ruin and death of her father and on the whole community that let it happen. The film stars Daniel Auteuil and Yves Montand reprising their roles from the first film, and Emmanuelle Béart as the titular protagonist. Béart won the César Award for Best Supporting Actress for her performance.

The two films are ranked No. 60 in Empire magazine's "The 100 Best Films of World Cinema" in 2010.

== Plot ==
Ten years after the events of Jean de Florette, Jean’s daughter Manon lives in the Provençal countryside near Les Romarins, the farm that her father once owned. She has taken up residence with an elderly Piedmontese squatter couple, who have taught her to live off the land, tending to a herd of goats and hunting for birds and rabbits. Ugolin Soubeyran has begun a successful business growing carnations at Les Romarins with his uncle César—also known as "Papet"—thanks to the water provided by the spring there.

As a young child, Manon had suffered the loss of her father, who died from a blow to the head while using explosives in an attempt to find a water source. Unknown to Jean, Ugolin and his uncle had plugged the spring in order to ruin his efforts to make his farm profitable. After Jean died, César and Ugolin bought the farm cheaply from his widow—Manon's mother—and unblocked the spring. Manon witnessed this as a child, and understood how the two men had tricked her father and profited directly from his death.

After seeing her bathe nude in the mountains, Ugolin develops an interest in Manon. When he approaches her, she reacts with disgust at his vileness. Ugolin's attraction to Manon becomes obsessive, culminating in sewing a ribbon from her hair onto his chest. At the same time, Manon becomes interested in Bernard, a handsome and educated schoolteacher recently arrived in the village.

When she overhears two villagers talking about the circumstances of her father's death, Manon realises that many in the village knew of the crime but had remained silent, for the Soubeyran family was locally important. While searching for a goat that fell into a crevice above the village, Manon finds the underground source of the spring that supplies water to the local farms and village. To take her revenge on both the Soubeyrans and the villagers, who knew but did nothing, she stops the flow of water using the iron-oxide clay and rocks found nearby.

The villagers quickly become desperate for water to feed their crops and run their businesses. They come to believe that the water flow had been stopped by some Providence to punish the injustice committed against Jean. Manon publicly accuses Papet and Ugolin, and the villagers admit their own complicity in the persecution of Jean. They had never accepted him as he was an outsider and was physically deformed. Papet tries to evade the accusations, but an eyewitness, a poacher who was trespassing on the vacant property at the time, steps forward to confirm the crime, shaming both Papet and Ugolin. Ugolin makes a desperate attempt to ask Manon for her hand in marriage, but she rejects him. The Soubeyrans flee in disgrace. Ugolin later hangs himself from a tree outside his family's house, apparently ending the Soubeyran line.

The villagers appeal to Manon to take part in a religious procession to the village's fountain because she is orphaned, hoping that acknowledging the injustice done to her will restore the flow of water to the village. With the assistance of Bernard, Manon unblocks the spring in advance, and the water arrives at the village at the moment that the procession reaches the fountain. Manon marries Bernard.

Meanwhile, Papet has been broken by his nephew's suicide. Delphine, an old acquaintance of his, returns to the village and tells him that Florette, his sweetheart from that period, had written to him to tell him she was carrying their child. Receiving no reply from him, she had tried to abort it. Florette left the village, married a blacksmith from nearby Créspin, and the child was born alive but a hunchback.

César, away on military service in Africa, never received her letter and did not know that she had given birth to his child. In a cruel twist of fate, Jean, the man he drove to desperation and death without having ever spoken to him, was the son he had always wanted. Realizing now that Manon is related to him, Papet sadly watches her, pregnant, hurry home at night, wishing to reconcile with his only grandchild, but knowing it will never happen.

Devastated, and lacking the will to live any longer, Papet dies quietly in his sleep. In a letter he leaves all of his property to Manon, whom he recognises as his natural granddaughter and the last of the Soubeyrans.

== Cast ==
- Yves Montand as César Soubeyran/'Le Papet' ("the grandfather"), an old farmer who, during the previous film, successfully schemed to ruin Jean's farm so he and his nephew Ugolin could later own the land. He now wishes Ugolin to marry in order to perpetuate their family.
- Daniel Auteuil as Ugolin Soubeyran, César's nephew, nicknamed 'Galinette' ("little hen") by his uncle. Having appropriated Jean's land at the end of the first film, he now finds himself hopelessly in love with Manon.
- Emmanuelle Béart as Manon Cadoret, the daughter of Jean Cadoret who died at the end of the first film as a result of Papet and Ugolin's actions. Still living in the hills near the village, Manon is now seeking to avenge her father's death.
- Hippolyte Girardot as Bernard Olivier, the schoolteacher, a newcomer to the village who tries to make sense of the local intrigues and eventually wins Manon's heart.
- Margarita Lozano as Baptistine, an old Italian woman living in the countryside, who becomes Manon's ally.
- Yvonne Gamy as Delphine
- Ticky Holgado as The Specialist, a rural engineering expert
- Jean Bouchaud as The Parish Priest
- Élisabeth Depardieu as Aimée Cadoret, Manon's mother and Jean's widow
- Gabriel Bacquier as Monsieur, a singer at the wedding
- Armand Meffre as Philoxène
- Pierre Nougaro as Casimir
- Jean Maurel as Anglade
- Roger Souza as Ange
- Didier Pain as Eliacin
- Marc Betton as Martial
- Chantal Liennel as Amandine, Papet's servant
- Fransined as The Florist
- Ève Brenner as Madame, a singer at the wedding

== Production ==
The film was shot back-to-back with the first part of the story, Jean de Florette. Together, the two films were at the time the most expensive project ever for the French film industry.

Shooting for both films ran from 22 April 1985 to 27 December 1985. The sequence in which Manon bathes naked posed some difficulties. Being modest, Emmanuelle Béart was reluctant to undress in front of the crew. In an effort to resolve the situation, Claude Berri undressed and dived naked into the water to break the ice. As a result, Béart followed suit. Also, Béart, who was in a relationship with Auteuil at the time, found it difficult to express hatred for him: their final scene together, where Manon rejects Ugolin's marriage proposal, took one week to shoot.

Theatre actress Yvonne Gamy, who had made her film debut in the 1952 version where she had a supporting part, played the pivotal role of Delphine. She was the only performer to appear in both film versions.

== Reception ==
=== Box office ===
The film was a domestic and international success, grossing nearly $4 million in US sales.

=== Critical response ===
On the review aggregator website Rotten Tomatoes, 81% of 31 critics' reviews are positive, with an average rating of 8.60/10.

=== Awards ===
- 1987: César Award for Best Actress in a Supporting Role – Emmanuelle Béart
- 1987: National Board of Review Award for Best Foreign Language Film (shared with Jean de Florette)

== Legacy ==
The Jean de Florette/Manon des Sources film saga is often seen, in conjunction with Peter Mayle's book A Year in Provence, as generating increased interest in, and tourism to, the region of Provence, particularly among the British. The films showed the area as a place of rural authenticity, and were followed by an increase in British home ownership in southern France.

=== Home media ===
MGM released Manon des Sources and Jean de Florette on DVD on July 24, 2007. The next home media release would come in January 2015, when both films were released in a two disc Blu-ray set released by Shout Factory.

On April 22, 2025, Manon des Sources, along with Jean de Florette, were announced for release in The Criterion Collection, as part of their April 2025 release slate, on both standard Blu-ray and 4K Ultra HD Blu-ray formats, based on new 4K digital restorations supervised by director of photography Bruno Nuytten. Special features included with this release include two documentaries, one about the life and career of director Claude Berri, and one about the making of both films, as well as original trailers, and a printed essay by film scholar Sue Harris.
