= Julien Rassam =

French actor

- Born: Julien Langmann; 14 June 1968; Paris, France
- Died: 3 February 2002 (aged 33); Paris, France
- Occupation: Actor
- Years active: 1972–2000
- Parent(s): Claude Berri; Anne-Marie Rassam
- Relatives: Thomas Langmann (brother); Arlette Langmann (aunt); Jean-Pierre Rassam (uncle); Dimitri Rassam (cousin)

Julien Rassam (né Langmann) (14 June 1968 – 3 February 2002) was a French actor.

== Biography ==
Born Julien Langmann, Rassam was the son of French film director Claude Berri and brother of film producer Thomas Langmann. His father Claude Berri is Jewish, and his mother Anne-Marie Rassam, is of Lebanese Christian ancestry. On his mother's side, he was the nephew of producer Jean-Pierre Rassam and Paul Rassam. His mother, Anne-Marie Rassam, committed suicide in 1997, jumping from the apartment of Isabelle Adjani's mother.

== Career ==
As a child, Rassam appeared in two films directed by his father. In 1992, he played the lead role of the film Albert Souffre. That same year, he appeared in The Accompanist, for which he was nominated for the César Award for Most Promising Newcomer in 1993, and he wrote and directed the short film Jour de colère. In 1994, he played a supporting role in Queen Margot.

== Personal life and death ==
Rassam was in a relationship with actress Marion Cotillard in the late 1990s. He became a paraplegic in 2000 after an accidental fall from the fourth floor of the Hôtel Raphael in Paris, three years after his mother committed suicide by jumping from a building. Rassam committed suicide in 2002.

== Filmography ==
Year	Title	Role	Notes
1972	Sex-Shop	Jules	Uncredited
1975	Le Mâle du siècle	Julien	
1992	Albert Souffre	Albert	
1992	The Accompanist	Benoît Weizman	
1993	Maigret	Lecoeur	Episode: "Maigret et l'homme du banc"
1993	Jour de colère		Short, writer and director
1993	Nulle part		
1994	Queen Margot	Alençon	
1994	Tous les garçons et les filles de leur âge...	Paul	Episode: "Portrait d'une jeune fille de la fin des années 60 à Bruxelles"
1994	Yalla yaana		
1997	Le Secret de Polichinelle	Julien	
1998	Le Poulpe	Le Travesti	
1999	Furia	Le résistant #1	(final film role)
