= The Water of the Hills =

1962 novel by Marcel Pagnol

- Cover of a comic book adaptation of the first part of the book (French edition)
- Author: Marcel Pagnol
- Original title: L'Eau des collines
- Translator: W.E. van Heyningen
- Language: French
- Publication date: 1962
- Publication place: France
- English publication date: 1966

The Water of the Hills (L'Eau des collines) is a two-volume novel by the French writer and director Marcel Pagnol, made up of Jean de Florette and Manon des sources, both originally published in 1962. It was first translated in English in 1966, under the title Manon of the Springs.

The books tell a tale of deception, betrayal and revenge, set in the hills of the massif de l'Étoile, near Pagnol’s home city of Marseille in southern France, in the early 20th century.

Pagnol adapted the novel from a film he had himself written and directed in 1952, Manon of the Spring. The first volume functioned as a prequel of Pagnol's original script, while the second volume told a new version of the 1952 film's story. Pagnol said he had based himself on a story he had heard at the age of thirteen, from a peasant who lived in the mountains above his parents' holiday home near Aubagne (and thus near the fictional La Bastide).

An adaptation of the complete novel was directed by Claude Berri in 1986, with the two films Jean de Florette and Manon des sources.

== Plot summary ==
=== Volume one ===
Jean de Florette is the story of ‘le bossu’, a hunchbacked former clerk in a tax office who inherits a farm in the hills above the fictional village of La Bastide in Provence and, together with his wife and young daughter, dreams of making his fortune by raising rabbits. However his intricate plans and hard work are constantly thwarted by a relentless drought and the deception of his neighbours, the Soubeyrans, two grasping and unprincipled farmers who block the farm's spring to trick the naïve newcomer out of his land. Their plans eventually succeed when Jean works himself to death and his widow is forced to sell the land to the Soubeyrans for a fraction of its value. Unfortunately for the farmers, the dead man's daughter Manon sees them unblocking the spring which would have saved her father and vows revenge.

=== Volume two ===
Manon of the Springs (Manon des Sources), which takes up the story several years later, is the tale of Jean de Florette's daughter Manon, now reduced to living in a cave with a local shepherd and his wife. After locating the source of the village water supply she exacts a suitable revenge, both on the Soubeyrans for the inadvertent death of her father and on the other inhabitants of the village for the mean-spirited way they had treated her family and helped to drive her father to an early death. After the suicide of the younger Soubeyran, Manon is persuaded by the village schoolmaster (who has guessed what she had done) to unblock the spring. She does this just as a village religious procession is being planned to ask divine intervention to restore the water supply.

At the moment that the procession, led by the saint's image and the parish priest (and which Manon has joined), returns to the village, the water begins flowing again from the village fountain. At the same time, a stranger arrives in the village: an old flame of Manon's mother, from her old career as an opera singer. The older couple marry, as do Manon and the schoolmaster. In a final ironic twist, it is revealed that the older Soubeyran, unknown to him until his last months of life, was the father of Jean de Florette. He dies at exactly the moment that Manon gives birth to a son (Soubeyran's great-grandson), to whom his great-grandfather has left all of his property and considerable fortune.

== Film adaptations ==
- Jean de Florette, directed by Claude Berri, starring Yves Montand, Gerard Depardieu and Daniel Auteuil.
- Manon des Sources, directed by Claude Berri, starring Yves Montand, Daniel Auteuil and Emmanuelle Béart.
