= Dimitri Rassam =

French film producer

- Born: 16 November 1981 (age 44); Paris, France
- Occupation: Film producer
- Spouses: Masha Novoselova (m. 2010; div. 2016) Charlotte Casiraghi (m. 2019; sep. 2024)
- Children: 2
- Parents: Jean-Pierre Rassam (father); Carole Bouquet (mother)
- Relatives: Claude Berri (uncle-in-law); Julien Rassam (cousin); Thomas Langmann (cousin)

Dimitri Rassam (born 16 November 1981) is a French film producer and a member of the Monegasque princely family through marriage.

== Background and education ==
Rassam is the son of actress Carole Bouquet and Franco-Lebanese film producer Jean-Pierre Rassam. He has one half-brother, Louis, born in 1987 to his mother's relationship with the photographer Francis Giacobetti.

Rassam finished secondary school at École Active Bilingue with a Bac scientifique, then prepped at Sciences Po. He began work on a business degree at HEC Paris, but changed course to earn a degree in history (from the Sorbonne) instead.

== Career ==
Dimitri Rassam founded the production company Chapter 2 in 2005. He has produced over 20 films, including The Little Prince (2015) by Mark Osborne (2016 César Awards for Best Animated Film and selected out-of-competition at the 68th Cannes Film Festival) and several very successful French films (What's in a Name?, Le Brio, Daddy or Mommy 1 and 2) that have also generated many international remakes.

He created the group On Entertainment in 2014, in association with Aton Soumache, which became one of Europe's leading companies in animation.

The company became part of the Mediawan group in 2018.

In 2020, Dimitri Rassam initiated with Pathé the production of the films The Three Musketeers (2023) by Martin Bourboulon starring François Civil, Vincent Cassel, Romain Duris, Pio Marmai, Eva Green, Louis Garrel, Vicky Krieps, Jacob Fortune-Lloyd, Lyna Khoudri etc. It is one of Europe's largest productions with a budget of 72M€ for a 150-day shoot.

He also has recently completed Benjamin Millepied's first feature film CARMEN (2022) (starring Melissa Barrera, Paul Mescal, Rossy de Palma and The Doc), premiering at the 2022 Toronto International Film Festival. As well as Emanuele Crialese’s next film L'Immensità (2022) starring Penélope Cruz and premiering at the 79th Venice International Film Festival on September 4, 2022.

He produced Kirill Serebrennikov's first English-language film Limonov: The Ballad (2023) adapted from the novel by Emmanuel Carrère with Ben Whishaw as the leading role.

It was announced in December 2024 that Rassam will be producing an ambitious film adaptation of Maurice Druon's The Accursed Kings (Les Rois maudits in French) novel series for newly formed production company, Yapluka. Production on The Iron King, the first film, is planned to start in 2026. Its budget of approximately $80 million will make it the most expensive French film since Valerian and the City of a Thousand Planets (2017).

== Personal life ==
He married Masha Novoselova in 2010. His daughter, Darya, was born in 2011. At the end of 2016, he separated from Novoselova and subsequently got divorced. In 2017, he began to date Charlotte Casiraghi. In March 2018, Rassam and Casiraghi were engaged. Their son, Balthazar, was born on 23 October 2018. Rassam and Casiraghi married in a civil ceremony at the Prince's Palace of Monaco on 1 June 2019. On 29 June 2019, they married religiously at Sainte-Marie de Pierredon Abbey, Saint-Rémy-de-Provence. In early 2024, it was reported that the couple had separated and they were said to be divorced later that year. The English-language media came around to widespread reporting of the separation later in the year and largely relied on a report from Voici magazine in France dated from January 2024. In September 2024, the UK's Telegraph newspaper interviewed Casiraghi about her literary and philosophical activities and just made a brief mention of the now-confirmed separation and divorce.

== Filmography ==
Rassam is credited as producer of the following films:

=== Films ===
- 2008 : Trouble at Timpetill by Nicolas Bary
- 2010 : Libre échange by Serge Gisquière
- 2012 : What's in a Name? by Matthieu Delaporte and Alexandre De La Patellière - the film had five nominations at the 38th César Awards particularly in Best Film, winning in the categories Best Supporting Actress (Valérie Benguigui) and Best Supporting Actor (Guillaume de Tonquédec).
- 2012 : Upside Down by Juan Solanas
- 2012 : Bad Girl by Patrick Mille
- 2013 : The Scapegoat by Nicolas Bary
- 2013 : The Informant by Julien Leclercq
- 2014 : Un illustre inconnu by Matthieu Delaporte
- 2014 : Escobar: Paradise Lost by Andrea Di Stefano
- 2015 : Mune: Guardian of the Moon by Benoît Philippon and Alexandre Heboyan
- 2015 : Daddy or Mommy by Martin Bourboulon
- 2015 : The Little Prince by Mark Osborne - for this film, Rassam, Aton Soumache, Alexis Vonarb, and Mark Osborne received the 2016 César Award for Best Animated Film.
- 2016 : Going to Brazil by Patrick Mille
- 2016 : Daddy or Mommy 2 by Martin Bourboulon
- 2017 : Le Brio by Yvan Attal - the film was nominated at the 43rd César Awards for Best Film and Camélia Jordana received the 2018 César Award for Most Promising Actress.
- 2019 : Play by Anthony Marciano
- 2019 : Just a Gigolo by Olivier Baroux
- 2019 : Playmobil: The Movie by Lino DiSalvo
- 2019 : Our Lady of the Nile by Atiq Rahimi
- 2019 : Le Meilleur reste à venir by Matthieu Delaporte et Alexandre de la Patellière
- 2021 : Envole-moi by Christophe Barratier
- 2022 : Carmen, by Benjamin Millepied
- 2023 : L'Immensità by Emanuele Crialese
- 2023 : The Three Musketeers: D'Artagnan by Martin Bourboulon
- 2023 : The Three Musketeers: Milady by Martin Bourboulon
- 2024: The Count of Monte Cristo by Matthieu Delaporte et Alexandre de la Patelliere - Film nominated in multiple categories in the 50th Cesar Awards.
- 2024 : Limonov : the ballad of Eddie by Kirill Serebrennikov
- 2025: 13 Days, 13 Nights by Martin Bourboulon
- 2025: T'as pas Change by Jerome Commandeur
- 2026: Fatherland by Pawel Pawlikowski

=== Short films ===
- 2006 : Judas (2006)

=== TV series ===
- 2012 : The Little Prince (one episode : The Planet of the Okidians)
- 2011-2012 : Iron Man: Armored Adventures (15 episodes)
