= Carole Bouquet =

French actress (born 1957)

- Bouquet in 2026
- Born: 18 August 1957 (age 69); Neuilly-sur-Seine, France
- Occupation: Actress
- Years active: 1977–present
- Spouse: Jacques Leibowitch (m. 1992; div. 1996)
- Partner(s): Jean-Pierre Rassam (1981–1985); Gérard Depardieu (1996–2005)
- Children: 2, including Dimitri Rassam

Carole Bouquet (French: [kaʁɔl bukɛ]; born 18 August 1957) is a French actress and model who has appeared in more than 60 films since 1977. She is perhaps best known for playing Bond girl Melina Havelock in the James Bond film For Your Eyes Only (1981). In 1990, she was awarded the César Award for Best Actress for her role in Too Beautiful for You.

== Early life ==
Bouquet was born 18 August 1957 in Neuilly-sur-Seine.

== Career ==
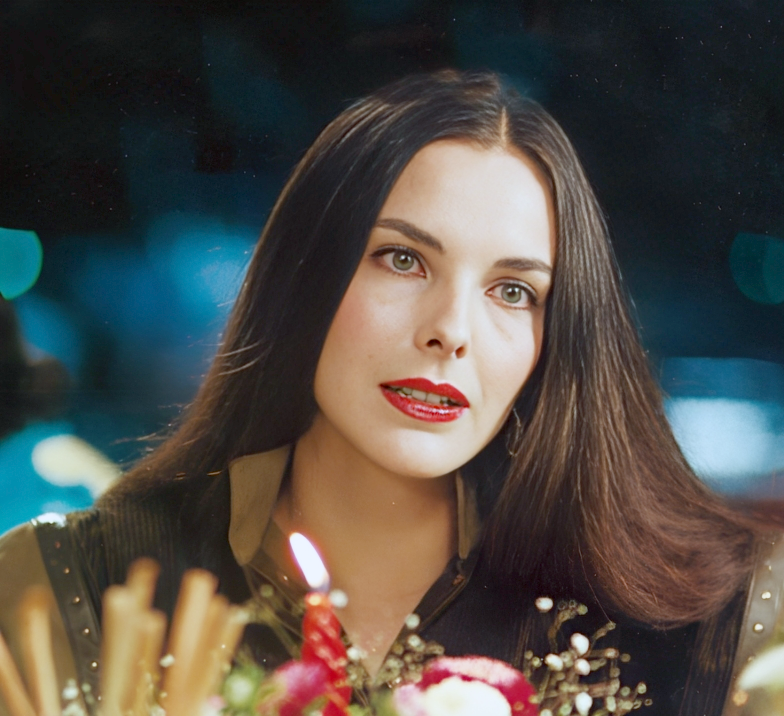
Bouquet in 1982

Bouquet made her film acting debut in Luis Buñuel's surrealist classic That Obscure Object of Desire (1977). Bouquet portrayed the Bond girl Melina Havelock, opposite Roger Moore in the 1981 James Bond film For Your Eyes Only. She received a César Award nomination for Best Supporting Actress in Rive droite, rive gauche (1984), and won the César Award for Best Actress for her performance in Too Beautiful For You (1989).

In the 1980s, she was a model for French luxury fashion label Chanel, being the face of Chanel No. 5. She was the face of Chanel No. 5 fragrance from 1986 to 1997.

In 1999, she was a jury member of the 4th Shanghai International Film Festival.

She was a member of the main competition jury of the Cannes Film Festival in 2014.

== Personal life ==
She was the companion of film producer Jean-Pierre Rassam, with whom she had a son, Dimitri Rassam, also a producer. In 1987, she gave birth to a son with her companion, photographer Francis Giacobetti. She married immunologist Jacques Leibowitch in 1992; they divorced in 1996. From 1996 to 2005, she was in a relationship with actor Gérard Depardieu.

On 21 May 2014, Bouquet formalized her relationship with Philippe Sereys de Rothschild on the red carpet of the 37th Festival de Cannes, of which she was one of the jury members.

She has been running a winery, Maison Carole Bouquet, on the island of Pantelleria in the Strait of Sicily since 2005.

== Filmography ==
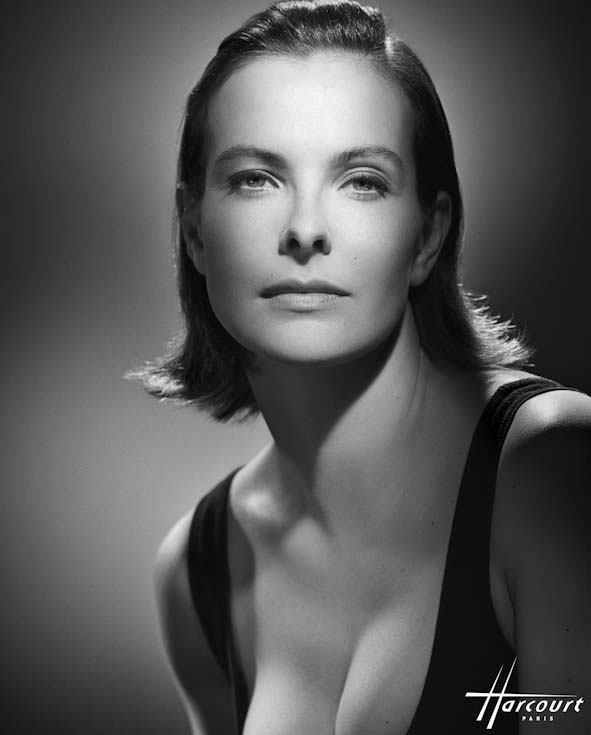
Bouquet photographed in 1995 by the studio Harcourt

Year	Title	Role	Notes
1977	La famille Cigale	Béatrice Damien-Lacour	TV miniseries
1977	That Obscure Object of Desire	Conchita	
1977	Les rebelles	Nilca	Telefilm
1979	The Persian Lamb Coat	Valentine	
1979	Buffet froid	The young woman at the end	
1979	L'Œil de la nuit	Lena	TV series
1980	Blank Generation	Nada	
1981	For Your Eyes Only	Melina Havelock	
1981	Day of the Idiots	Carole	
1982	Bingo Bongo	Laura	
1983	Dagger Eyes	Mystère	
1984	Le bon roi Dagobert	Héméré	
1984	Rive droite, rive gauche	Babé Senanques	Nominated—César Award for Best Supporting Actress
1984	Nemo	Rals-Akrai	
1985	Spécial Police	Isabelle Rodin	
1986	Double Gentlemen	Hélène	
1986	The Malady of Love	Eleonore	
1987	Jenatsch	Lucrezia von Planta	
1989	New York Stories	Princess Soroya	Segment: "Life Without Zoé"
1989	Too Beautiful for You	Florence Barthélémy	César Award for Best Actress
1989	Bunker Palace Hôtel	Clara	
1991	Donne con le gonne	Margherita	
1993	Tango	Female Guest	
1994	A Business Affair	Kate Swallow	
1994	Dead Tired	As herself	
1997	Lucie Aubrac	Lucie Aubrac	
1997	The Red and the Black	Louise de Rénal	Telefilm
1998	In All Innocence	Viviane Farnese	
1999	The Bridge	Mina	
2000	Lulu Kreutz's Picnic	Anna Ghirardi	
2000	Bérénice	Bérénice	Telefilm
2001	Diamond Earrings	Madame de	Telefilm
2001	Wasabi	Sofia	
2002	Summer Things	Lulu	
2002	Blanche	Anne of Austria	
2002	Ruy Blas	The Queen	Telefilm
2003	Bienvenue chez les Rozes	Béatrice	
2004	Red Lights	Hélène Dunan	
2004	Bad Spelling	Geneviève Massu	
2004	Sex and the City	Juliette	TV series
2005	Northeast	Hélène	Stockholm Film Festival – Best Actress
2005	Housewarming	Chantal Letellier	
2005	Hell	Marie	
2006	Aurore	The Queen	
2006	Un ami parfait	Anna	
2007	Perfect Match...	Hélène	
2008	Behind the Walls	Fil de fer's mother	
2008	Trouble at Timpetill	Madame Drohne	
2009	L'Éloignement	Denise	Telefilm
2009	Je vais te manquer	Julia	
2010	Protéger et servir	Aude Lettelier	
2010	Libre échange	Marthe	
2010	Le mystère	Chloé	
2011	Impardonnables	Judith	
2012	Bad Girl	Alice	
2014	Rosemary's Baby	Margaux Castevet	TV miniseries
2014, 2016	Spin	Élisabeth Marjorie	TV series
2014	Do Not Disturb	Nathalie Leproux	
2017	La Mante	Jeanne Deber/The Mantis	Netflix Original Series
2018	Kiss & Tell	Lucie	
2019	On a Magical Night	Irène Haffner	
2020	Grand Hôtel	Agnès Vasseur	Television mini-series
2020	Boutchou	Paula	
2020	I Love You Coiffure	Caroline Sonneville	Telefilm
2021-2022	In Therapy	Esther	TV series
2021	Fantasies	Marie	
2022	Ils s'aiment...enfin presque !	Delphine	TV series
2022	Ride Above	Madame Cooper	
2023	Captives	Hersilie Rouÿ	
2023	Escort Boys	Catherine Vogel	TV series
2024	La Maison	Diane Rovel	TV series
2024	Cat's Eyes	Hélène Durieux	TV series
2025	Behind the Palm Trees	Clotilde	
2026	Love Letters	Nadège	
2026	The Good Lawyer	Anne Lamarck	

== Theatre ==
Year	Production	Location
1992	Old Times	Théâtre Hébertot
2002	Phèdre	Théâtre National de Nice & Théâtre Déjazet
2008	Berenice	Théâtre des Bouffes du Nord
2009	L'Éloignement	Théâtre Édouard VII
2010	Lettres à Génica, folies d'amour	Théâtre de l'Atelier
2014	Ashes to Ashes	Théâtre de l'Œuvre & Théâtre des Célestins
2015	Home	Théâtre de l'Œuvre

== See also ==
- List of celebrities who own wineries and vineyards
