= Jean-Pierre Rassam =

Lebanese-French film producer

- Born: 14 October 1941; Beirut, Lebanon
- Died: 28 January 1985 (aged 43); Paris, France
- Occupations: Film producer, distributor
- Years active: 1967-1985
- Partner: Carole Bouquet (1981-1985)
- Children: Dimitri Rassam (son)
- Relatives: Claude Berri (brother-in-law); Arlette Langmann (sister-in-law by marriage); Thomas Langmann (nephew); Julien Rassam (nephew)

Jean-Pierre Rassam (14 October 1941 – 28 January 1985) was a French film producer mostly active during the 1970s. He was found dead, age 43, in his suite at the Plaza Athénée, the cause of death being barbiturate overdose, in 1985.

== Career ==
With his brother-in-law, Claude Berri, they played a role in the production of Miloš Forman's The Firemen's Ball (1967) and bought international rights.

Rassam worked as an assistant to Jean-Luc Godard and then went on to produce Godard's 1972 film Tout va bien which was also co-directed by Jean-Pierre Gorin.

As well as his film production credits, he also made contributions to The Mother and the Whore (1973) and Tess (1979).

He was critical of Gaumont and unsuccessfully tried to buy them in 1974.

He stopped his involvement in film for several years before returning to help on Good King Dagobert (1984).

== Personal life ==
Born in Beirut, to Thomas Joseph Rassam, a diplomat from a bourgeois family of Syrian Christian origin.

He was in a relationship with actress Carole Bouquet, with whom he has one son, film producer Dimitri Rassam. Bouquet has called him the love of her life.

His brother Paul was an executive for French distributor AMLF who distributed films for Berri in the early 1970s.

== Partial filmography ==
- Don't Touch The White Woman! (1974)
- Lancelot of the Lake (1974)
- Chinese in Paris (1974)
- Blood for Dracula (1973)
- Flesh for Frankenstein (1973)
- The Mother and the Whore (1973)
- La Grande Bouffe (1973)
- Tout va bien (1972)
- We Won't Grow Old Together (1972)
