= Claude Berri =

French filmmaker (1934–2009)

- Born: Claude Beri Langmann; 1 July 1934; Paris, France
- Died: 12 January 2009 (aged 74); Paris, France
- Occupations: Film producer, director, screenwriter, distributor, actor
- Years active: 1953–2009
- Spouse(s): Anne-Marie Rassam (m. 1967; d. 1987); Sylvie Gautrelet (m. ??; d. ??)
- Partner: Nathalie Rheims (1998-his death)
- Children: 3, including Julien Rassam; Thomas Langmann
- Relatives: Arlette Langmann (sister); Jean-Pierre Rassam (brother-in-law); Dimitri Rassam (nephew-in-law)
- Awards: Academy Award for Best Live Action Short Film (for The Chicken, 1965); BAFTA Award for Best Film (for Jean de Florette, 1987)

Claude Berri (French: [bɛʁi]; 1 July 1934 – 12 January 2009) was a French film director, producer, screenwriter, distributor and actor.

Berri was a leading figure of the French film industry both a director and as a producer. Following a short film that won an Academy Award, Berri achieved success with his first feature film, The Two of Us (1967). He then had a varied career, producing and distributing both mainstream and avant-garde films. During the 1970s, Berri's films as a director were mostly comedies but he later found increased success with several high-profile literary adaptations. In 1986, his two-part film Jean de Florette and Manon of the Spring won public and critical acclaim, becoming his best-known work. He next directed Uranus (1990) and most notably Germinal (1993). In 1997, he directed the historical biopic Lucie Aubrac.

Directors whose films were produced by Berri include Bertrand Blier, Edouard Molinaro, Francis Veber, Roman Polanski, Jacques Demy, Jean-Jacques Annaud, Jean Yanne, Claude Sautet, Costa Gavras, Miloš Forman, Philippe de Broca, Claude Zidi, Patrice Chéreau, Alain Chabat, Abdellatif Kechiche, Yvan Attal, Didier Bourdon, Bernard Campan, Christian Vincent and Dany Boon.

== Early life ==
Born Claude Beri Langmann in Paris, Berri was the son of Jewish immigrant parents. His mother, Beila (née Bercu), was from Romania, and his father, Hirsch Langmann, was a furrier from Poland. In 1943, during the Nazi occupation of France, Berri's parents entrusted him for his safety to a family in the countryside. He spent the rest of the occupation being fostered by "an antisemitic couple" who were unaware that he was Jewish. His sister, screenwriter and editor Arlette Langmann, was born after the war.

== Career ==
Berri's original vocation was to be an actor. He began a career in the early 1950s but struggled to find roles, which prompted him to turn to directing and eventually producing. In 1965, he gained notice for The Chicken, which won the Award for best short film at the 38th Academy Awards.

In 1967, Berri directed The Two of Us (Le Vieil homme et l'enfant), a partially autobiographical film that told the story of a Jewish child, entrusted during World War II to a benevolent and antisemitic old farmer who remains unaware that the boy he is caring for is a Jew. The film was a great success in France and abroad. Berri also adapted the story into a novel, released the same year as the film.

During the years that followed, Berri became active as a producer and film distributor while continuing to direct his own films. Also in 1967, with his associate (later brother-in-law) Jean-Pierre Rassam, Berri bought the international distribution rights for Miloš Forman's The Firemen's Ball which was a great success and was nominated to the Academy Award for Best International Feature Film. Berri's company, Renn Productions, which he had founded to produce The Two of Us, gradually became a major player in the French film industry.

Whereas Berri's films as a director were not major box-office successes during the 1970s, he was more fortunate as a producer. He notably associated himself with Christian Fechner to produce Claude Zidi's successful comedies, including those starring the comedy team Les Charlots who were particularly popular in France at the time. He also produced films starring Pierre Richard, then France's new comedy star, directed by Richard himself or by Zidi. While enjoying box-office success as a producer or co-producer of comedies, Berri was also involved in producing more challenging avant-garde films, such as Jean Eustache's The Mother and the Whore (1973) or Jacques Rivette's Céline and Julie Go Boating (1974). In 1979, he produced Roman Polanski's Tess (1979), which won the César Award for Best Film in 1980 and was nominated in 1981 to the Academy Award for Best Picture.

Throughout his directing and producing career, Berri appeared occasionally as an actor, in his own films or in those of other directors. He played starring roles in five of his films, Mazel Tov ou le Mariage (1968), Le Cinéma de papa (1971), Sex Shop (1972), Le Mâle du siècle (1975) and La Débandade (1999). Most of his other appearances were supporting parts or cameos, one notable exception being a starring role in Serge Gainsbourg's Stan the Flasher (1989).

Most of Berri's earlier films as a director were comedies, until the melancholic romance film Je vous aime (1980), starring Catherine Deneuve, which was inspired by the separation from his wife. Berri later said that he had become less interested in directing comedies following the illness of his first wife, as his personal life was no longer a source of inspiration and amusement.

During the 1980s, Berri had a successful association with comedian Coluche: in 1980, he produced Inspector Blunder, Coluche's return to film, which was a commercial hit. Berri directed Coluche himself in the comedy Le Maître d'école (1981), and produced his next two vehicles, Quarter To Two B.C. (1982) and Banzaï (1983). In 1983, Berri directed the crime drama So Long, Stooge (Tchao Pantin) starring Coluche in his first dramatic role. At the time, a review in Le Monde praised Berri's evolution as a director formerly known for his lightweight comedies, and described the film as a return to poetic realism. So Long, Stooge was a box-office hit and received twelve nominations at the César Awards, with Coluche winning the César Award for Best Actor.

Berri next directed and produced a series of successful adaptations of French classic novels. In 1986, he made the two-part film that constitutes his best-known work, Jean de Florette and its sequel, Manon of the Spring (Manon des Sources), based on Marcel Pagnol's two-volume novel. Both films, who were at the time the French film industry's most expensive project ever, were huge international hits.

In 1990, Berri directed Uranus, based on Marcel Aymé's novel. The film, a dark satire of postwar France, was entered into the 41st Berlin International Film Festival. In 1993, he made Germinal, based on Émile Zola's classic novel. Like his 1986 Jean de Florette/Manon des sources project, Berri's Germinal was at the time the highest budget in the history of French cinema.

In 1997, Berri's film Lucie Aubrac, based on the eponymous resistance heroin's memoir, was entered into the 47th Berlin International Film Festival.

In 2003, he was elected as president of the Cinémathèque française where he obtained enough state subsidies to cover the costs of its resurgence at its new site in the rue de Bercy.

Berri's box-office successes as a producer include Jean-Jacques Annaud's The Bear (1988) and The Lover (1992) and Patrice Chéreau's La Reine Margot (1994). He also produced the first two live-action films of the Asterix franchise, Asterix and Obelix vs. Caesar (1999) and Asterix & Obelix: Mission Cleopatra (2002), the latter of which became one of the most commercially successful French films ever. Berri had been initially reluctant to work on a comic book adaptation until his son Thomas Langmann convinced him to produce the Asterix films.

In 2004, the big-budget action comedy San-Antonio was a box-office disaster, severely impacting Berri's production company. Berri had to rely on a €2 million loan from his partner Nathalie Rheims to keep his business afloat. The next year, Berri sold his remaining shares in Renn Productions to Pathé, shortly after initiating two major film projects, Abdellatif Kechiche's The Secret of the Grain (2007) and Dany Boon's Welcome to the Sticks (2008). The latter film's success, in particular, allowed him to pay off his debts for San-Antonio.

Berri won the BAFTA Award for Best Film in 1987 for Jean de Florette. In France, he was nominated for twelve César Awards, including the César Award for Best Film and the César Award for Best Director, though he never won.

== Personal life ==
Berri's first marriage was with Anne-Marie Rassam, sister of film producer Jean-Pierre Rassam. They had two children: actor Julien Rassam (1968–2002) and actor and film producer Thomas Langmann (b. 1971). They separated in the late 1970s, though they were not divorced until 1987. Anne-Marie, who suffered from bipolar disorder, committed suicide in 1997 by jumping from a balcony.

Berri's second marriage was with costume designer Sylvie Gautrelet, with whom he had a son, Darius (b.1986).

Already suffering from depression and affected by the death of his first wife, Berri was further impacted when his eldest son also committed suicide in 2002. Julien Rassam had been physically disabled since an accident two years earlier. Berri's film L'Un reste, l'autre part (2005) was inspired by this family tragedy.

From 1998 to his death, Berri was the partner of author and producer Nathalie Rheims.

Berri was a connoisseur and collector of fine arts and photography. He was the owner of two galleries in Paris that specialized in modern art. Art collecting was a passion project for Berri: in 1986, he sold the majority of his shares in Renn Productions to Pathé in order to fund this activity.

== Death and succession ==
Berri died of a stroke, in Paris, aged 74, one week info filming the comedy Trésor. The film was completed by François Dupeyron.

After Berri's death, a collection of nine works by Robert Ryman, Ad Reinhardt, Giorgio Morandi, Richard Serra and Lucio Fontana was promised to the Centre Pompidou in Paris in lieu of tax. But Berri's heirs ultimately sold them to Qatar, through French art dealer Philippe Ségalot, for about €50 million.

A legal dispute over Berri's succession eventually broke out between Thomas Langmann, his half-brother Darius, the latter's mother Sylvie Gautrelet, and Nathalie Rheims. Thomas accused Darius, Gautrelet and Rheims of misappropriating his father's assets, notably by stealing valuable works of art from his extensive collection. In July 2015, Thomas Langmann filed a complaint against his half-brother. In March 2025, Darius Langmann, Gautrelet, Rheims and several other people including an art expert, a family member and former employees of Claude Berri, were indicted for conspiracy to commit aggravated theft, breach of trust and tax evasion.

== Filmography ==
=== Director ===
- 1962: Le Poulet (short) (released 1965) Winner Best Live Action Short Film Oscar (also produced)
- 1964: Les Baisers (segment « Baiser de 16 ans »)
- 1964: La Chance et l'amour (segment « La Chance du guerrier »)
- 1967: Le Vieil Homme et l'Enfant (US title: The Two of Us) (also screenwriter)
- 1968: Mazel Tov ou le Mariage
- 1969: Le Pistonné
- 1971: Le Cinéma de papa
- 1972: Sex-shop
- 1975: Le Mâle du siècle
- 1976: La Première fois
- 1977: Un moment d'égarement
- 1980: Je vous aime
- 1981: Le Maître d'école
- 1983: Tchao Pantin (English title: So Long, Stooge)
- 1986: Jean de Florette
- 1986: Manon des Sources (US title: Manon of the Spring) — sequel to Jean de Florette
- 1990: Uranus
- 1993: Germinal
- 1996: Lucie Aubrac
- 1999: La débandade
- 2002: Une femme de ménage (English title: A Housekeeper)
- 2004: L'Un reste, l'autre part
- 2007: Ensemble, c'est tout (English title: Hunting and Gathering)
- 2009: Trésor (also screenwriter and producer; died after one week of filming)

=== Producer ===
All his films as a director, plus:

- 1967: Marie pour mémoire (dir. Philippe Garrel) – associate producer
- 1968: Oratorio for Prague short documentary film (dir. Jan Nemec)
- 1969: L'Enfance nue (dir. Maurice Pialat)
- 1970: La Maison (dir. Gérard Brach)
- 1972: L'Œuf (dir. Jean Herman)
- 1972: Stadium Nuts (Les Fous du stade) (dir. Claude Zidi, co-producer)
- 1973 : I Don't Know Much, But I'll Say Everything (dir. Pierre Richard, co-producer)
- 1973: Pleure pas la bouche pleine (dir. Pascal Thomas)
- 1973 : The Big Store (dir. Claude Zidi, co-producer)
- 1973 : The Mother and the Whore (dir. Jean Eustache, co-producer)
- 1974: Lucky Pierre (dir. Claude Zidi, co-producer)
- 1974 : Céline and Julie Go Boating (dir. Jacques Rivette, co-producer)
- 1974 : Les Bidasses s'en vont en guerre (dir. Claude Zidi, co-producer)
- 1975 : La Course à l'échalote (dir. Claude Zidi, co-producer)
- 1976: Je t'aime… moi non-plus (dir. Serge Gainsbourg, co-producer)
- 1978: Vas-y maman (dir. Nicole de Buron) (uncredited)
- 1978: Une histoire simple (dir. Claude Sautet)
- 1979: Tess (dir. Roman Polanski)
- 1980: Inspecteur la Bavure (dir. Claude Zidi)
- 1982: Deux heures moins le quart avant Jésus-Christ (dir. Jean Yanne)
- 1983: L'Africain (dir. Philippe de Broca)
- 1983: Banzaï (dir. Claude Zidi)
- 1983: L'Homme blessé (dir. Patrice Chéreau)
- 1983: La Femme de mon pote (dir. Bertrand Blier)
- 1983: Garçon ! (English title: Waiter!) (dir. Claude Sautet)
- 1985: Les Enragés (dir. Pierre-William Glenn)
- 1985: Le Fou de guerre (English title: Madman at War) (dir. Dino Risi) (also French adaptation)
- 1987: Hôtel de France (dir. Patrice Chéreau)
- 1988: À gauche en sortant de l'ascenseur (dir. Édouard Molinaro)
- 1988: L'Ours (English title: The Bear) (dir. Jean-Jacques Annaud)
- 1988: Trois places pour le 26 (dir. Jacques Demy)
- 1988: La Petite Voleuse (dir. Claude Miller)
- 1989: Valmont (dir. Miloš Forman)
- 1992: L'Amant (English title: The Lover) (dir. Jean-Jacques Annaud)
- 1993: Une journée chez ma mère (dir. Dominique Cheminal)
- 1994: La Reine Margot (dir. Patrice Chéreau)
- 1994: La Séparation (dir. Christian Vincent)
- 1995: Les Trois Frères (dir. Didier Bourdon) and Bernard Campan (also actor)
- 1995: Gazon maudit (dir. Josiane Balasko) – (executive producer)
- 1996: Le Roi des aulnes (German title: Der Unhold; English The Ogre) (dir. Volker Schlöndorff) – (executive producer)
- 1997: Didier (dir. Alain Chabat)
- 1997: Arlette (dir. Claude Zidi)
- 1997: Le Pari (English title: The Bet) (dir. Didier Bourdon and Bernard Campan)
- 1998: Mookie (dir. Hervé Palud) – (associate producer)
- 1999: Astérix et Obélix contre César (English title: Asterix and Obelix vs Caesar) (dir. Claude Zidi)
- 1999: The Escort (dir. Michel Blanc)
- 2001: La Boîte (dir. Claude Zidi)
- 2001: Ma femme est une actrice (dir. Yvan Attal)
- 2002: Amen. (dir. Costa-Gavras)
- 2002: Astérix & Obélix : Mission Cléopâtre (English title: Asterix & Obelix: Mission Cleopatra) (dir. Alain Chabat)
- 2003: Le Bison (dir. Isabelle Nanty)
- 2003: Les Sentiments (dir. Noémie Lvovsky)
- 2004: San-Antonio (dir. Frédéric Auburtin)
- 2004: Ils se marièrent et eurent beaucoup d'enfants (dir. Yvan Attal)
- 2005: Les Enfants (dir. Christian Vincent)
- 2005: Le Démon de midi (dir. Marie-Pascale Osterrieth)
- 2005: La Maison du Bonheur (dir. Dany Boon)
- 2007: La Graine et le Mulet (English titles: The Secret of the Grain or Couscous) (dir. Abdellatif Kechiche)
- 2008: Bienvenue chez les Ch'tis (English title: Welcome to the Sticks) (dir. Dany Boon)

=== Writer ===
- 1967: Le Vieil Homme et l'Enfant, novel released the same year as the film version. (English: The Two of Us. Helen Weaver (translation), Lydia Rosier (drawings). Morrow. 1968. OCLC 343943.)
- 1968: Mazel Tov ou le Mariage
- 1969: Le Pistonné
- 1970: Le Cinéma de Papa
- 1972: Sex-shop
- 1975: Le Mâle du Siècle (English title: Male of the Century )
- 1976: La Première Fois
- 1977: Un moment d'égarement
- 1980: Je vous aime
- 1981: Le Maître d'École
- 1983: Tchao Pantin (English title: So Long, Stooge)
- 1986: Jean de Florette
- 1986: Manon des Sources (US title: Manon of the Spring)
- 1990: Uranus
- 1993: Germinal
- 1997: Lucie Aubrac
- 1999: La Débandade
- 2002: Une Femme de Ménage (English title: A Housekeeper)
- 2004: L'un Reste, l'Autre Part (English title: One Stays, the Other Leaves)
- 2007: Ensemble, c'est tout (English title: [Hunting and Gathering)

=== Actor ===
- Rue de l'Estrapade (1953) – Bit part (uncredited)
- Good Lord Without Confession (1953) – as Eugène's son (uncredited)
- Le Blé en herbe (1954) – as projectionist's son (uncredited)
- French Cancan (1955) – as young man at the inauguration (uncredited)
- Dangerous Games (1958) – as young man
- Asphalte (1959) – as member of Gino's band (uncredited)
- I Spit on Your Grave (1959) – as David
- Les Bonnes Femmes (1960) – as Jane's boyfriend
- Zazie dans le Métro (1960) – as Waiter (uncredited)
- La Vérité (1960) – as Georges
- My Baby is Black (1961)
- Please, Not Now! (1961) – as Bernard
- The Seven Deadly Sins (1962) – as André (segment "Avarice, L'") (uncredited)
- Behold a Pale Horse (1964)
- The Sleeping Car Murders (1965) – as lifter (uncredited)
- Line of Demarcation (1966) – as Jewish father (uncredited)
- Mazel Tov ou le Mariage (1968) – as Claude
- Le pistonné (1970) – as military doctor
- Le Cinéma de papa (1971) – as adult Claude Langmann
- Le Sex Shop (1972) – as Claude
- Zig-Zag (1975) – as Marie and Pauline's client (uncredited)
- Le mâle du siècle (1975) – as Claude
- Le roi des cons (1981) – as policeman
- The Wounded Man (1983) – as client
- Stan the Flasher (1990) – as Stan Goldberg
- Germinal (1993) – Narrator (voice, uncredited)
- The Machine (1994) – as Hugues
- Les Trois Frères (1995) – as judge
- Didier (1997) – as first man in airport
- Un grand cri d'amour – as Maillard
- La débandade (1999) – as Claude Langmann
- Va savoir (2001) – as librarian
- Les Rois mages (2001) – as bystander (uncredited)
- Asterix & Obelix: Mission Cleopatra (2002) – as Cleopatra's painter
- Les clefs de bagnole (2003) – as himself / producer
- Happily Ever After (2004) – as Vincent's father (final film role)

== Publications ==
- Le Vieil homme et l'enfant, Raoul Solar, 1967
- Autoportrait, Léo Scheer, 2003

== See also ==
- 1962 in film
