= Vanessa Paradis discography =

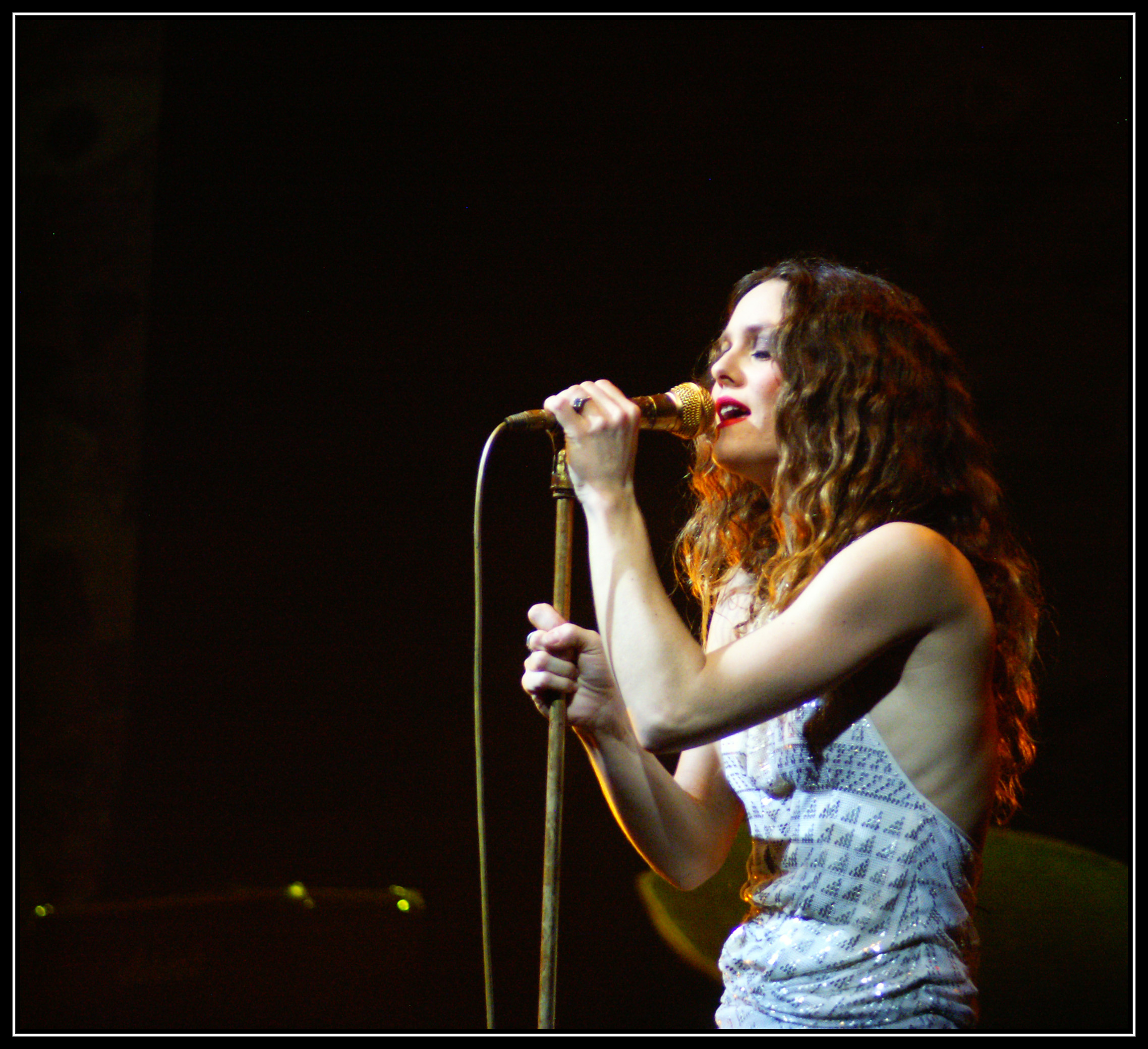
- Paradis performing live in 2007, during her Divinidylle Tour at Châteauroux, France.
- Studio albums: 8
- Soundtrack albums: 2
- Live albums: 4
- Compilation albums: 2
- Singles: 30

The discography of the French pop singer Vanessa Paradis consists of eight studio albums—M&J (1988), Variations sur le même t'aime (1990), Vanessa Paradis (1992), Bliss (2000), Divinidylle (2007), Love Songs (2013), Les sources (2018) and Le retour des beaux jours (2025). Simultaneously, she released four live albums, Live (1994), Au Zénith (2001), Divinidylle Tour (2008) and Une nuit à Versailles (2010). Her discography also features a greatest hits collection entitled Best of Vanessa Paradis (2009) and two soundtracks; namely Atomik Circus (2004) by The Little Rabbits and Un monstre à Paris (2011) recorded with -M-.

== Albums ==
=== Studio albums ===
| Year | Album details | Peak chart positions | | | | | | | | Sales | Certifications |
| Year | Album details | AT | BE | CH | DE | FR | NL | SE | UK | Sales | Certifications |
|---|---|---|---|---|---|---|---|---|---|---|---|
| 1988 | M&J: Released: 15 August 1988; Label: Barclay/Polydor (#835 949); Format: LP, MC, CD | — | — | — | 61 | 13 | — | — | — | FR: 350,000 | SNEP: Platinum |
| 1990 | Variations sur le même t'aime: Released: 18 June 1990; Label: Barclay/Polydor (#843 447); Format: LP, MC, CD | — | — | — | — | 6 | — | — | — | | SNEP: Platinum |
| 1992 | Vanessa Paradis: Released: 1 May 1992; Label: Barclay/Polydor (#513 954); Format: LP, MC, CD | 22 | — | — | 53 | 1 | 44 | 27 | 45 | | SNEP: Platinum |
| 2000 | Bliss: Released: 21 October 2000; Label: Barclay/Universal (#549 194); Format: LP, CD | — | 18 | 31 | — | 1 | — | — | — | | SNEP: 2× Gold |
| 2007 | Divinidylle: Released: 27 August 2007; Label: Barclay/Universal (#530 187); Format: LP, CD | — | 1 | 6 | — | 1 | — | — | — | | SNEP: 2× Platinum |
| 2013 | Love Songs: Released: May 2013; Label: Barclay/Universal; Format: 2×LP, 2×CD | — | 2 | 4 | — | 1 | — | — | — | | SNEP: Platinum |
| 2018 | Les sources: Released: 16 November 2018; Label: Barclay; Format: CD, LP, download | — | 12 | 33 | — | 6 | — | — | — | | SNEP: Gold |
| 2025 | Le retour des beaux jours: Released: 10 October 2025; Label: Barclay; Format: CD, LP, download | — | 4 | 17 | — | 3 | — | — | — | | |
"—" denotes a title that did not chart or was not released in that region.

=== Live albums ===
| Year | Album details | Peak chart positions | | Certifications |
| Year | Album details | BE | FR | Certifications |
|---|---|---|---|---|
| 1994 | Live: Released: 28 February 1994; Label: Remark/Polydor (#521 693); Format: LP, CD | — | 7 | SNEP: Gold |
| 2001 | Au Zénith: Released: 11 November 2001; Label: Barclay/Universal (#589 441); Format: CD, DVD | — | 19 | |
| 2008 | Divinidylle Tour: Released: 20 September 2008; Label: Barclay/Universal (#530 988); Format: CD, DVD, 2LP | 5 | 5 | |
| 2010 | Une nuit à Versailles: Released: 29 November 2010; Label: Barclay/Universal (#unknown); Format: CD, DVD | 26 | 17 | |
| 2014 | Love Songs Tour: Released: 24 November 2014; Label: Barclay/Universal; Format: CD, DVD | 30 | 22 | |
"—" denotes a title that did not chart or was not released in that region.

=== Soundtracks ===
| Year | Album details | Peak chart positions | |
| Year | Album details | BE | FR |
|---|---|---|---|
| 2004 | Atomik Circus with The Little Rabbits: Released: 7 April 2004; Label: Barclay/Universal (#982 113); Format: CD, DVD | — | 54 |
| 2011 | Un monstre à Paris with -M-: Released: October 2011; Label: N/A; Format: CD | 10 | 7 |
"—" denotes an album that did not chart or was not released in that region.

=== Compilations ===
| Year | Album details | Peak chart positions | | | Certifications |
| Year | Album details | BE | CH | FR | Certifications |
|---|---|---|---|---|---|
| 2009 | Best of Vanessa Paradis: Released: 23 November 2009; Label: Remark/Polydor (#532 286); Format: 2LP, 2CD, download | 1 | 43 | 1 | FR: Platinum |
| 2019 | Best of & Variations: Released: 29 November 2019; Label: Barclay; Format: 2LP, 2CD, download, streaming | 45 | — | 29 | |
"—" denotes an album that did not chart or was not released in that region.

== Singles ==
=== As lead artist ===
| Year | Title | Peak chart positions | | | | | | | | | | | Sales | Certifications | Album |
| Year | Title | AT | AU | BE | CH | DE | FR | NL | NO | NZ | SE | UK | Sales | Certifications | Album |
|---|---|---|---|---|---|---|---|---|---|---|---|---|---|---|---|
| 1987 | "Joe le taxi" | — | — | 8 | — | 8 | 1 | 25 | 5 | — | 7 | 3 | FR: 1,300,000; WW: 3,200,000 | FR: Platinum | M&J |
| 1988 | "Manolo Manolete" | — | — | — | — | — | 10 | — | — | — | — | — | | | M&J |
| 1988 | "Marilyn & John" | — | — | — | — | 35 | 5 | — | — | — | — | — | FR: Silver | | M&J |
| 1988 | "Maxou" | — | — | — | — | — | 13 | — | — | — | — | 119 | | | M&J |
| 1989 | "Coupe coupe" | — | — | — | — | — | 22 | — | — | — | — | — | | | M&J |
| 1989 | "Mosquito" | — | — | — | — | — | — | — | — | — | — | — | | | M&J |
| 1990 | "Tandem" | — | — | — | — | — | 22 | 25 | — | — | — | — | | | Variations sur le même t'aime |
| 1990 | "Dis-lui toi que je t'aime" | — | — | — | — | — | 41 | — | — | — | — | — | | | Variations sur le même t'aime |
| 1991 | "L'Amour en soi" | — | — | — | — | — | — | — | — | — | — | — | | | Variations sur le même t'aime |
| 1992 | "Be My Baby" | 19 | 96 | — | — | 10 | 5 | 4 | — | 26 | 11 | 6 | | | Vanessa Paradis |
| 1993 | "Sunday Mondays" | — | 161 | — | — | 51 | 41 | 36 | — | — | — | 49 | | | Vanessa Paradis |
| 1993 | "Natural High" | — | — | — | — | — | — | — | — | — | — | — | | | Vanessa Paradis |
| 1993 | "Just as Long as You Are There" | — | — | — | — | — | — | — | — | — | — | 57 | | | Vanessa Paradis |
| 1994 | "Les Cactus" (Live) | — | — | — | — | — | — | — | — | — | — | — | | | Live |
| 1994 | "Gotta Have It (Live)" | — | — | — | — | — | — | — | — | — | — | — | | | Live |
| 2000 | "Commando" | — | — | — | — | — | 43 | — | — | — | — | — | | | Bliss |
| 2000 | "Pourtant" | — | — | — | — | — | — | — | — | — | — | — | | | Bliss |
| 2001 | "Que fait la vie?" | — | — | — | — | — | — | — | — | — | — | — | | | Bliss |
| 2001 | "L'Eau à la bouche (Live)" | — | — | — | — | — | — | — | — | — | — | — | | | Au Zénith |
| 2001 | "Walk on the Wild Side (Live)" | — | — | — | — | — | — | — | — | — | — | — | | | Au Zénith |
| 2007 | "Divine idylle" | — | — | 5 | 53 | — | 160 | — | — | — | — | — | | | Divinidylle |
| 2007 | "Dès que j'te vois" | — | — | — | — | — | — | — | — | — | — | — | | | Divinidylle |
| 2008 | "L'Incendie" | — | — | 54 | — | — | — | — | — | — | — | — | | | Divinidylle |
| 2008 | "Les piles (Live)" with -M- | — | — | — | — | — | — | — | — | — | — | — | | | Divinidylle Tour |
| 2008 | "Joe le taxi (Live)" | — | — | — | — | — | — | — | — | — | — | — | | | Divinidylle Tour |
| 2009 | "Il y a" | — | — | 4 | 56 | — | 52 | — | — | — | — | — | | | Best Of |
| 2011 | "La Seine" with -M- | — | — | 3 | — | — | 9 | — | — | — | — | — | | | (OST) Un; Monstre à Paris |
| 2013 | "Love Song" | — | — | 19 | — | — | 20 | — | — | — | — | — | | | Love Songs |
| 2013 | "Les espaces et les sentiments" | — | — | — | — | — | 100 | — | — | — | — | — | | | Love Songs |
| 2014 | "Mi amor" | — | — | — | — | — | 57 | — | — | — | — | — | | | Love Songs |
| 2014 | "Pas besoin de permis" with Benjamin Biolay | — | — | — | — | — | 35 | — | — | — | — | — | | | Love Songs Tour |
| 2017 | "Le baiser" | — | — | — | — | — | 109 | — | — | — | — | — | | | (VA) Souchon Dans L'Air |
| 2018 | "Ces mots simples" | — | — | — | — | — | — | — | — | — | — | — | | | Les Sources |
| 2019 | "Kiev" | — | — | — | — | — | — | — | — | — | — | — | | | Les Sources |
| 2019 | "La plage" | — | — | — | — | — | — | — | — | — | — | — | | | Les Sources |
| 2019 | "Vague à l'âme soeur" | — | — | — | — | — | — | — | — | — | — | — | | | Best of & Variations |
| 2025 | "Bouquet Final" | — | — | — | — | — | — | — | — | — | — | — | | | Le retour des beaux jours |
| 2025 | "Le retour des beaux jours" | — | — | — | — | — | — | — | — | — | — | — | | | Le retour des beaux jours |
| 2025 | "Les épines du cœur" | — | — | 47 | — | — | — | — | — | — | — | — | | | Le retour des beaux jours |
"—" denotes a single that did not chart or was not released in that region.

=== As featured artist ===
| Year | Title | Peak chart positions | | | Album |
| Year | Title | BE | CH | FR | Album |
|---|---|---|---|---|---|
| 2008 | "Adrienne" with Albin de la Simone | — | — | — | Bungalow!^{[A]} |
| 2017 | "Did You Really Say No" with Oren Lavie | — | — | — | Bedroom Crimes |
| 2019 | "Dans l'univers" with Nekfeu | 50 | 29 | 2 | Les étoiles vagabondes |
"—" denotes a single that did not chart or was not released in that region.

Notes

- A The Bungalow! album by De la Simone charted at number 155 in France.
