= Best of Vanessa Paradis =

Best of

Greatest hits album by Vanessa Paradis
- Released: 23 November 2009
- Genre: Pop, Rock
- Label: Polydor, Barclay Records, Universal Records

Vanessa Paradis chronology
Divinidylle Tour (2008)	Best of (2009)	Une nuit à Versailles (2010)

Best of Vanessa Paradis is the first greatest hits album from French musician and actress Vanessa Paradis. The album is also known as simply Best of.

The first single from the album is the ballad Il y a, written and produced by Gaëtan Roussel (of Louise Attaque). The video for the song was directed by 'JD' (Johnny Depp).

The album also contains Vanessa's rendition of I Love Paris that was used in advertisements for Aéroports de Paris.

A collector's edition of the album will be available digitally on 16 November 2009. Included in the collector's edition is a 64-page book featuring more than 50 photos and documents tracing Vanessa's career.

== Track listing ==
=== Disc one ===
1. "Il y a" (Gaëtan Roussel)
2. "Pourtant" (Matthieu Chedid, Franck Monnet)
3. "Marilyn & John" (Franck Langolff, Étienne Roda-Gil)
4. "Dis lui toi que je t'aime" (Serge Gainsbourg, Langolff)
5. "Joe le taxi" (Langolff, Roda-Gil)
6. "Maxou" (Langolff, Roda-Gil)
7. "Sunday Mondays" (Henry Hirsch, Lenny Kravitz)
8. "Tandem" (Gainsbourg, Langolff)
9. "Natural High" (Kravitz)
10. "Commando" (Didier Golemanas, Langolff)
11. "Be My Baby" (Gerry DeVeaux, Kravitz)
12. "Divine idylle" (Chedid, Marcel Kanche)
13. "Dès que j'te vois" (Chedid)
14. "Just as Long as You Are There" (Hirsch, Kravitz)
15. "Que fait la vie" (Golemanas, Vanessa Paradis)
16. "L'incendie" (Chedid, Golemanas, Paradis, Serge Ubrette)

=== Disc two ===
1. "Marilyn & John" (Acoustic version)
2. "Dans mon café" (Golemanas, Langolff)
3. "La déclaration d'amour" (Live - duet with Matthieu Chedid) (Michel Berger)
4. "Jackadi" (Paradis)
5. "I Love Paris" (Cole Porter)
6. "Emmenez-moi" (Live) (Charles Aznavour)
7. "La ballade de Johnny Jane" (Live – duet with Jane Birkin) (Gainsbourg, Jean-Pierre Sabar)
8. "When I Say" (Chedid, Paradis)
9. "Concia chachacha" (The Little Rabbits)
10. "St Germain" (Johnny Depp, Paradis)
11. "This Will Be Our Year" (Live) (Chris White)
12. "Les filles electriques" (Live – duet with Alain Souchon) (Alain Souchon)
13. "Made in Asia" (Pierre-Dominique Burgaud, Louis Chedid)
14. "Abracadabra" (Chedid, Monnet)
15. "I Wouldn't Dare" (Bill Carter, Ruth Ellsworth)
16. "Scarabée" (Acoustic version) (Langolff, Roda-Gil)
17. "Varvara Pavlovna" (Bertrand Châtenet, Langolff)

== Charts ==
=== Weekly charts ===
Chart (2009)	Peak position
Belgian Albums (Ultratop Wallonia)	1
Swiss Albums (Schweizer Hitparade)	43

=== Year-end charts ===
Chart (2009)	Position
Belgian Albums (Ultratop Wallonia)	78
Chart (2010)	Position
Belgian Albums (Ultratop Wallonia)	7

== Certifications ==
Region	Certification	Certified units/sales
Belgium (BRMA)	Gold	15,000^{*}
France (SNEP)	2× Platinum	200,000^{*}
^{*} Sales figures based on certification alone.

== Release history ==
Region	Date	Label	Format	Catalogue
Belgium	23 November 2009		CD	
France	23 November 2009	Barclay Music	CD	
Switzerland	23 November 2009		CD	
Canada	8 December 2009		CD	
