= Au Zénith =

Live album by Vanessa Paradis
- Released: November 11, 2001
- Recorded: May 30, 2001
- Venue: Le Zénith de Paris, Paris
- Genre: Pop, rock
- Label: Universal, Barclay, Polydor
- Producer: Vincent Pitras, Thierry Teodori

Vanessa Paradis chronology
Bliss (2000)	Au Zénith (2001)	Divinidylle (2007)

Professional ratings
Review scores
Source	Rating
AllMusic	4/5 stars

Au Zénith is the second live album by singer Vanessa Paradis. Steve Nieve of Elvis Costello's The Attractions is featured on the keyboard. The album was recorded during her performances at Le Zénith during her Bliss Tour.

== Track listing ==
1. Intro (music: Steve Nieve, Vanessa Paradis) 1:00
2. "L'Eau et le Vin" 5:22 (Alain Bashung, Didier Golemanas, Richard Mortier; album Bliss, 2000)
3. "Sunday Mondays" 4:47 (Henry Hirsch, Lenny Kravitz, Paradis; Vanessa Paradis, 1992)
4. "Dans mon café" 4:13 (Golemanas, Franck Langolff; Bliss)
5. "Walk on the Wild Side" 4:34 (Lou Reed; Variations sur le même t'aime, 1990)
6. "Dis-lui toi que je t'aime" 4:22 (Serge Gainsbourg, Langolff; Variations sur le même t'aime)
7. "L'Eau à la bouche" 2:11 (Gainsbourg; no album material)
8. "Joe le taxi" 4:08 (Étienne Roda-Gil, Langolff; M&J, 1988)
9. "St Germain" 4:00 (Johnny Depp, Paradis; Bliss)
10. "Requiem pour un con" 2:11 (Serge Gainsbourg; no album material)
11. "Que fait la vie?" 4:01 (Golemanas, Paradis; Bliss)
12. "La La La Song" 4:12 (Gerry DeVeaux, Paradis; Bliss)
13. "This Will Be Our Year" 2:14 (Chris White from the Zombies; no album material)
14. "Pourtant" 3:22 (Matthieu Chedid, Franck Monnet; Bliss)
15. "Tandem" 4:10 (Gainsbourg, Langolff; Variations sur le même t'aime)
16. "Commando" 4:19 (Golemanas, Langolff; Bliss)
17. "Marilyn & John" 5:36 (Roda-Gil, Langolff; M&J)
18. "Bliss" 5:03 (Depp, Paradis; Bliss)
19. "Les Acrobates" 3:15 (Monnet, Paradis; Bliss)

== Personnel ==
- Jack Petruzzelli - guitar, keyboards, backing vocals
- Boris Jardel - guitar, percussion, backing vocals
- Bruce Witkin - bass, double bass, backing vocals
- Steve Nieve - keyboards, backing vocals
- Mathieu Rabaté - drums, percussion
- Katisse Buckingham - saxophone, flute
- Lee Thornburg - trumpet, backing vocals

== Charts ==
=== Album ===
Chart (2001)	Peak Position
French Albums Chart	19
