= Live (Vanessa Paradis album) =

Live album by Vanessa Paradis
- Released: 28 February 1994
- Recorded: March–April 1993
- Venue: L'Olympia (Paris)
- Genre: Pop; rock
- Label: Remark

Vanessa Paradis chronology
| Vanessa Paradis (1992) | Live (1994) | Bliss (2000) |

Professional ratings
Review scores
| Source | Rating |
|---|---|
| Select | 1/5 medals |

Live is the first live album by French singer Vanessa Paradis, released on 28 February 1994 by Remark Records. The album was recorded on her Natural High Tour, on 21 April 1993 and is unique for featuring a large number of English songs when compared to her other live albums and tours.

== Track listing ==
=== CD and cassette ===
1. "Natural High" – 4:59 (Lenny Kravitz; album Vanessa Paradis, 1992)
2. "Les Cactus" – 2:47 (Jacques Lanzmann, Jacques Dutronc; no album material)
3. "Marilyn & John" – 4:10 (Étienne Roda-Gil, Franck Langolff; M&J, 1988)
4. "As Tears Go By" – 4:00 (Mick Jagger, Keith Richards; no album material)
5. "Tandem" 3:46 (Serge Gainsbourg, Langolff; Variations sur le même t'aime, 1990)
6. "Dis-lui toi que je t'aime" – 4:24 (Gainsbourg, Langolff; Variations sur le même t'aime)
7. "Joe le taxi" – 4:16 (Roda-Gil, Langolff; M&J)
8. "La Vague à lames" – 4:32 (Gainsbourg, Langolff; Variations sur le même t'aime)
9. "Maxou" – 4:29 (Roda-Gil, Langolff; M&J)
10. "Sunday Mondays" – 3:48 (Henry Hirsch, Kravitz, Paradis; Vanessa Paradis)
11. "Silver and Gold" – 2:46 (Kravitz; Vanessa Paradis)
12. "Gotta Have It" – 2:31 (Hirsch, Kravitz, Craig Ross; Vanessa Paradis)
13. "Lonely Rainbows" – 2:34 (Hirsch, Kravitz; Vanessa Paradis)
14. "I'm Waiting for the Man" – 3:31 (Lou Reed; Vanessa Paradis)
15. "Be My Baby" – 3:50 (Gerry DeVeaux, Kravitz; Vanessa Paradis)
16. "Just as Long as You Are There" – 6:00 (Hirsch, Kravitz; Vanessa Paradis)

Source: skamelot.free.fr

=== LP ===
Side A

1. "Natural High" – 4:59
2. "Les Cactus" – 2:47
3. "Marilyn & John" – 4:10
4. "As Tears Go By" – 4:00
5. "Tandem" 3:46
6. "Dis-lui toi que je t'aime" – 4:24
7. "Joe le taxi" – 4:16

Side B

1. "La Vague à lames" – 4:32
2. "Sunday Mondays" – 3:48
3. "Silver and Gold" – 2:46
4. "Gotta Have It" – 2:31
5. "Lonely Rainbows" – 2:34
6. "I'm Waiting for the Man" – 3:31
7. "Be My Baby" – 3:50

Source: skamelot.free.fr

== Personnel ==
- Reg Webb – keyboards
- Jack Petruzzelli – guitar
- Anthony Wilson – guitar
- Osama Afifi – bass guitar
- Zoro – drums
- Butch Thomas – saxophone
- Sandy Bougouneau – backing vocals
- Derin Young – backing vocals

Design

- Claude Gassian – photography
- Nathalie Baylaucq – cover design

== Charts ==
Chart performance for Live
| Chart (1994) | Peak position |
|---|---|
| Belgian Albums (IFPI) | 4 |
| French Albums (SNEP) | 7 |
