= Manolo Manolete =

Single by Vanessa Paradis
- Language: French
- B-side: "You You"
- Released: January 1988
- Genre: Pop
- Label: Polydor
- Composer: Franck Langolff
- Lyricist: Étienne Roda-Gil
- Producer: Franck Langolff

Vanessa Paradis singles chronology
"Joe le taxi" (1987)	"Manolo Manolete" (1988)	"Marilyn & John" (1988)

Music video
- "Manolo Manolete" on YouTube

"Manolo Manolete" is a song by French singer Vanessa Paradis. It was released as a single in January 1988.

== Writing and composition ==
The song was written by Franck Langolff and Étienne Roda-Gil. It reflects on the life of famous Spanish bullfighter Manolete.

== Track listing ==
All lyrics are written by Étienne Roda-Gil; all music is composed by Franck Langolff.

7-inch single – 887 265-7 (January 1988)
No.	Title	Length
1.	"Manolo Manolete"	3:58
2.	"You You"	4:00

== Charts ==
Chart (1988)	Peak position
France (SNEP)	10
Quebec (ADISQ)	36
