= Coupe coupe =

Single by Vanessa Paradis

from the album M&J
- Language: French
- A-side: "Coupe coupe" (Remix)
- B-side: "Scarabée" (Remix)
- Released: 1989
- Genre: Pop
- Label: Polydor
- Composer(s): Franck Langolff
- Lyricist(s): Étienne Roda-Gil
- Producer(s): Franck Langolff

Vanessa Paradis singles chronology
"Maxou" (1989)	"Coupe coupe" (1989)	"Mosquito" (1989)

Music video
- "Coupe coupe" on YouTube

"Coupe coupe" (lit. 'Cut, cut') is a song by French singer Vanessa Paradis from her debut album M&J. It was written by Franck Langolff and Étienne Roda-Gil and produced by the former.

In 1989, it was released as a single, peaking at number 22 in France.

== Track listing ==
All lyrics are written by Étienne Roda-Gil; all music is composed by Franck Langolff.

7-inch single – 871 942-7 (1989)
No.	Title	Length
1.	"Coupe coupe" (Remix)	4:10
2.	"Scarabée" (Remix)	4:10

== Charts ==
Chart (1989)	Peak position
France (SNEP)	22
Quebec (ADISQ)	5
