= Divinidylle Tour =

Live album by Vanessa Paradis
- Released: September 20, 2008
- Recorded: 2007
- Genres: Pop, rock
- Label: Barclay
- Producers: Matthieu Chedid, Oivier Lude

Vanessa Paradis chronology
Divinidylle (2007)	Divinidylle Tour (2008)	Best of Vanessa Paradis (2009)

Divinidylle Tour is the third live album by singer Vanessa Paradis. The album was recorded during her Divinidylle Tour and was also released with a DVD which documented the tour and Paradis' promotion of the album. The DVD won a Victoires de la Musique award for Best DVD Musical of the year.

== Track listing ==
1. "Irrésistiblement" 3:21
2. "Divine idylle" 2:44
3. Vanessa Paradis & -M- - "Les piles" 2:50
4. "Be My Baby" 3:39
5. "Dis lui toi que je t'aime" 4:32
6. "Que fait la vie?" 4:25
7. "La mélodie" 5:25
8. "Junior suite" 3:35
9. "Varvara Pavlovna" 2:28
10. "Pourtant" 5:55
11. "La bataille" 3:40
12. "Joe le taxi" 4:04
13. "Emmenez-moi" 3:58
14. "L'incendie" 4:57
15. "Les revenants" 4:15
16. "Chet Baker" 3:01
17. "Dès que j'te vois" 5:55
18. "Saint Germain" 2:21
19. "Jackadi" 3:36
20. "Le tourbillon" 1:34

== Personnel ==
- Vanessa Paradis - vocals
- François Lasserre, Matthieu Chedid - guitar
- Jérôme Goldet - bass
- Albin de la Simone - piano
- Patrice Renson - drums

== Charts ==
Chart (2008)	Peak position
French Albums Chart	5
Belgian Albums Chart (Wallonia)	5
