= White wedding (disambiguation) =

A white wedding is a traditional formal or semi-formal wedding originating in Great Britain.

White Wedding may also refer to:

- "White Wedding" (song), by Billy Idol
- Noce Blanche (White Wedding), 1989 French film
- White Wedding (2009 film), South African film
- "White Wedding" (Grey's Anatomy), 2011 episode of Grey's Anatomy
- Small Claims: White Wedding, 2005 Australian television film

== See also ==
- White marriage or Mariage blanc, marriage without consummation
