= Witch Way Love =

- Directed by: René Manzor
- Written by: René Manzor
- Produced by: Christian Fechner; Didier Pain; Hervé Truffaut
- Starring: Vanessa Paradis; Jean Reno; Gil Bellows
- Cinematography: Pal Gyulay
- Edited by: Christine Kapsambelis-Pansu
- Music by: Jean-Félix Lalanne
- Production company: Les Films Christian Fechner
- Distributed by: UGC Fox Distribution
- Release date: 19 March 1997
- Running time: 102 minutes
- Country: France
- Language: French

Witch Way Love (original title "Un Amour de Sorcière") is a 1997 French fantasy film written and directed by René Manzor.

== Plot ==
Morgane descends from a long line of witches. Her son Arthur has an innate gift for witchcraft. Yet Morgane wants him to become a normal human being without supernatural powers. There is only one way to achieve that. She needs to carry out an ancient ritual which requires the presence of a person who was born under a very specific constellation. The US-American inventor Michael meets all requirements. Morgane takes him to her family's castle in France. Meanwhile, the evil sorcerer Molok has a different plan. He kidnaps Arthur and tries to make him his successor.

== Cast ==
- Vanessa Paradis as Morgane Edramareck
- Jean Reno as Molok Edramareck
- Gil Bellows as Michael Firth
- Jeanne Moreau as Eglantine Edramareck
- Dabney Coleman as Joel Andrews
- Katrine Boorman as Rita
- Malcolm Dixon as Merlin
- Fantin Lalanne as Arthur Edramareck
- Éléonore Hirt as Chloé Edramareck
- Louise Vincent as Fleur Edramareck

== Reception ==
Variety judged this was "a weak tale of strong magic".

== Two versions ==
The movie has two language versions. One in French and one in English. The French version is widely available on DVD while the English one is hard to find.

== See also ==
- List of films about witchcraft
