= Osama Afifi =

American jazz bass guitarist

- Genres: Jazz
- Occupation(s): Musician, composer
- Instrument: Bass
- Years active: 1983-present

Osama Afifi is an American jazz bassist. He has recorded and performed live with many artists such as U.S. and Canadian tours with Yanni during the "Reflections of Passion", "Revolution in Sound", and "Dare to Dream" concert tours; a European and Canadian tour with French artist Vanessa Paradis; and a TV show on VH1 called Storytellers with The Doors. He worked with jazz vocalists Kurt Elling and Nnenna Freelon, The 5th Dimension, The Cadillacs, jazz saxophonist Gary Herbig, singer Debby Boone, keyboardist Kei Akagi, Doors drummer John Densmore, Brazilian style guitar duo Hugo Jojo, and jazz trumpeter Tony Guerrero.

For several years he has been the bassist for the B Sharp Jazz Quartet. The Quartet toured extensively throughout the United States and Europe. They performed at the North Sea, Istanbul, Nice, Brecon, and Monterey Jazz Festivals, to name a few. Afifi ventured into composition, co-writing the song "Nami" for the album Searching for the One. KLON, a Los Angeles jazz radio station, chose "Nami" to be on a compilation album.

His education includes studies at the Dick Grove School of Music. He also studied with Jeff Berlin and Gary Willis.
