= I Always Wanted to Be a Gangster =

2008 film

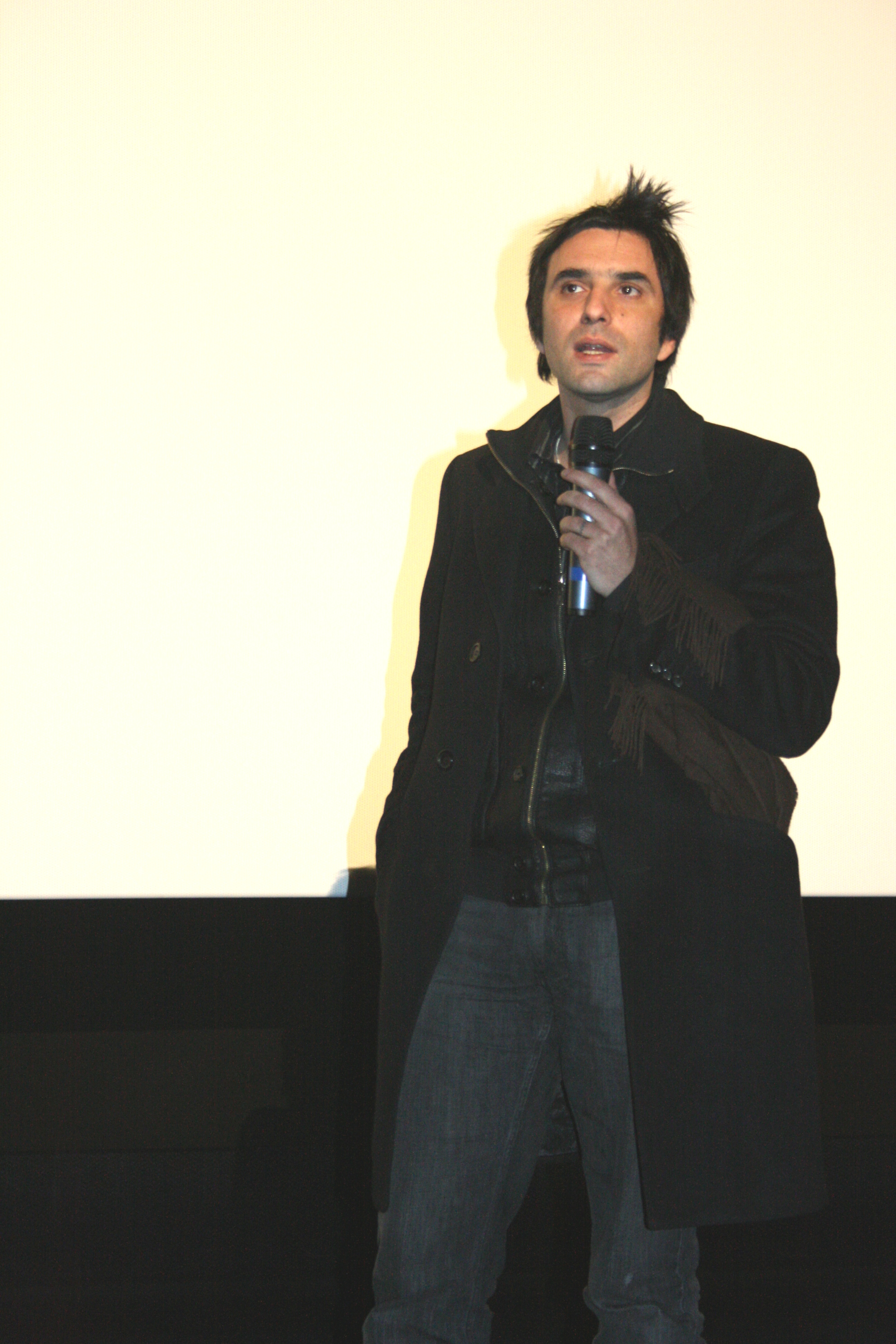
- Directed by: Samuel Benchetrit
- Starring: Anna Mouglalis; Édouard Baer
- Release date: 26 March 2008
- Running time: 1h 53min
- Country: France
- Language: French

I Always Wanted to Be a Gangster (French: J'ai toujours rêvé d'être un gangster) is a 2008 French comedy film directed by Samuel Benchetrit.

== Cast ==
- Anna Mouglalis - Suzy - la serveuse
- Édouard Baer - Gino - le braqueur
- Jean Rochefort - Jean
- Laurent Terzieff - Émile
- Jean-Pierre Kalfon - Max
- Venantino Venantini - Joe
- Roger Dumas - Pierrot la Pince
- Alain Bashung - Alain Bashung
- Arno - Arno
- Bouli Lanners - Léon
