= Love Songs for Tough Guys =

2021 film by Samuel Benchetrit

- Theatrical release poster
- French: Cette musique ne joue pour personne
- Directed by: Samuel Benchetrit
- Screenplay by: Samuel Benchetrit; Gábor Rassov
- Adaptation by: Samuel Benchetrit
- Dialogue by: Samuel Benchetrit
- Produced by: Julien Madon
- Starring: François Damiens; Ramzy Bedia; Vanessa Paradis; Gustave Kervern; JoeyStarr; Bouli Lanners; Valeria Bruni Tedeschi; Vincent Macaigne
- Cinematography: Pierre Aïm; David Quesemand (segment "India")
- Edited by: Clémence Diard
- Music by: Jeanne Trellu
- Production companies: A Single Man Productions; UGC; JM Films; Gapbusters; Shelter Prod; RTBF; Proximus; VOO; BeTV; Movie Pictures; Pictanovo
- Distributed by: UGC Distribution
- Release dates: 10 July 2021 (Cannes); 29 September 2021 (France)
- Running time: 107 minutes
- Countries: France; Belgium
- Language: French
- Box office: $655,228

Love Songs for Tough Guys (French: Cette musique ne joue pour personne, lit. 'This Music Plays for No One') is a 2021 romantic comedy film co-written and directed by Samuel Benchetrit. It stars François Damiens, Ramzy Bedia, Vanessa Paradis, Gustave Kervern, JoeyStarr, Bouli Lanners, Valeria Bruni Tedeschi and Vincent Macaigne. The film follows an aging gang of crooks who have to deal with a younger gang on their turf.

The film had its world premiere in the Cannes Premiere section of the Cannes Film Festival on 10 July 2021. It was released in France on 29 September 2021 by UGC Distribution.

== Premise ==
An aged criminal gang do their illegal business at a shipping port in Northern France. An accountant owes money to the boss. One of the gang members is sent to track him down and is somehow roped into taking part in a play. They have to deal with the actions of a gang on the same port who are much younger and take shots at them.

== Cast ==
- François Damiens as Jeff
- Vanessa Paradis as Suzanne
- JoeyStarr as Jesus
- Valeria Bruni Tedeschi as Katia
- Constance Rousseau as Roxanne
- Jules Benchetrit as Rudy
- Ramzy Bedia as Neptune
- Gustave Kervern as Jacky
- Bouli Lanners as Poussin
- Raphaelle Doyle as Jessica
- Vincent Macaigne as Eric Lamb

== Production ==
The film is a French-Belgian production. It was staged by A Single Man Productions and JM Films. It was directed by Samuel Benchetrit who also wrote the screenplay with Gábor Rassov. The cinematographer was Pierre Aïm. The editing was done by Clémence Diard. It was produced by Julien Madon, with co-producers, Joseph Rouschop and Jean-Yves Roubin.

Principal photography began in July 2019 in Longpont-sur-Orge, with filming taking place in Dunkirk as well.

== Reception ==
Davide Abbatescianni of Cineuropa felt that the plot is "quite uneven, but Benchetrit tries to unite the characters by choosing the overarching theme of the search for love", adding that "[t]he feeling one gets, however, is one of watching more of a juxtaposition of scenes and situations that are rarely coherent in terms of the narration." Matilda Marseillaise noted the aging gang members finding their softer sides while struggling to suppress their violent natures which occasionally come up. Calling it a joy to watch, the reviewer also said it was a "thoroughly enjoyable comedic journey into the lives of men finding their softer sides".
