= Bibo Bergeron =

French animator and film director

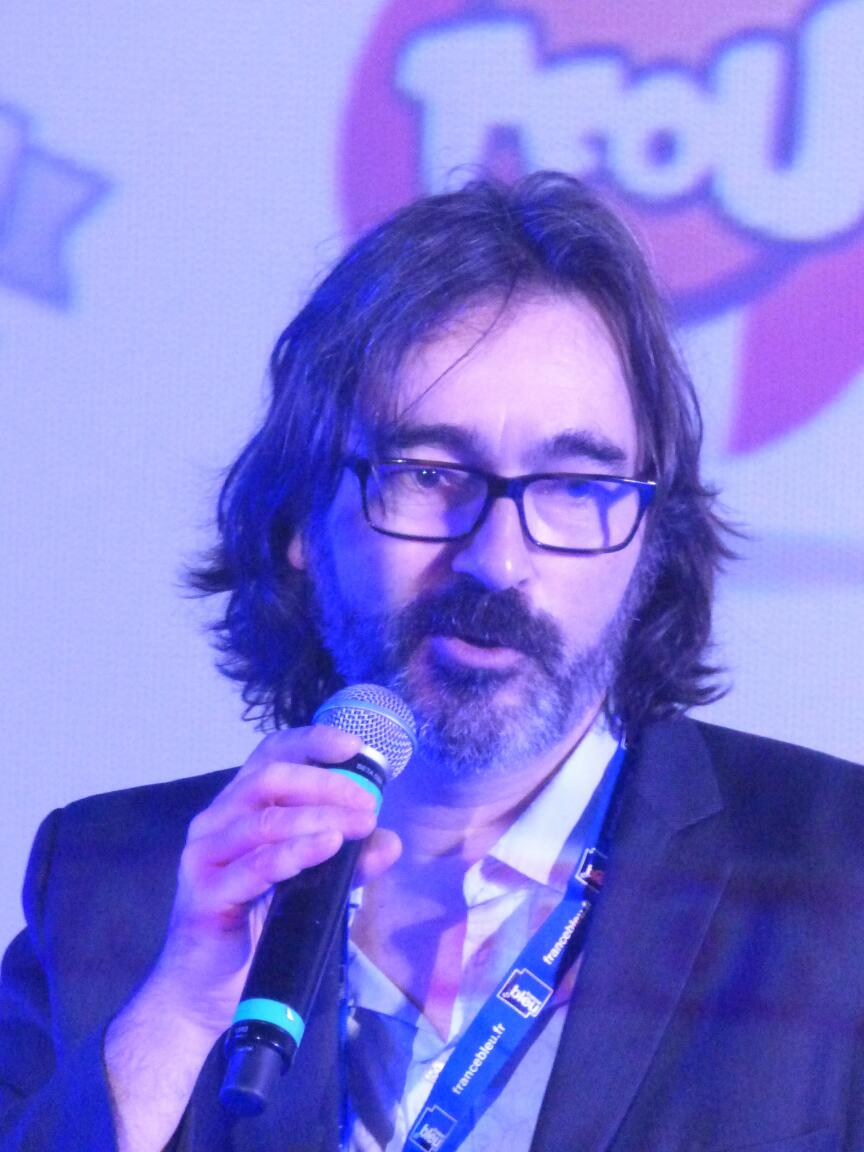
- Bergeron in 2016
- Born: Eric Bergeron; Paris, France
- Other name: Eric 'Bibo' Bergeron
- Education: Gobelins School of the Image
- Occupations: Animator; Storyboard Artist; Director; Writer
- Years active: 1986–present

Éric "Bibo" Bergeron is a French animator and film director. His work includes The Road to El Dorado (2000), Shark Tale (2004) and A Monster in Paris (2011).

Bergeron has served as animator on films like Asterix in Britain (1986), Asterix and the Big Fight (1989), Fievel Goes West (1991), FernGully: The Last Rainforest (1992), We're Back! A Dinosaur's Story (1993), All Dogs Go to Heaven 2 (1996), A Goofy Movie (1995), and The Adventures of Pinocchio (1996).

He also worked as storyboard artist on Sinbad: Legend of the Seven Seas (2003), The Madagascar Penguins in a Christmas Caper (2005) and Flushed Away (2006).

In 1993, Bergeron founded the animation studio "Bibo Films" in France. He directed the 2011 film A Monster in Paris which he dedicated to his father. Bergeron is an alumnus of the Gobelins School of the Image.

== Legal case ==
After being taken into police custody at the end of 2019, Éric Bergeron was indicted for sexual harassment and rape in early January 2020, in connection with a case related to the production of the film A Monster in Paris. The alleged incidents (which he denies) date back to 2007.

== Filmography ==
Director

- The Road to El Dorado (2000)
- Shark Tale (2004)
- A Monster in Paris (2011) (Also story writer)

Animator

- Asterix in Britain (1986) (Assistant)
- Asterix and the Big Fight (1987)
- An American Tail: Fievel Goes West (1991)
- FernGully: The Last Rainforest (1992)
- A Goofy Movie (1995)
- The Iron Giant (1999) (Uncredited)

Other credits

Year	Title	Position	Notes
1993	We're Back! A Dinosaur's Story	supervising animator	
1996	All Dogs Go to Heaven 2	directing animator	
1996	The Adventures of Pinocchio	animation supervisor	
2003	Sinbad: Legend of the Seven Seas	story artist	
2005	The Madagascar Penguins in a Christmas Caper	storyboard artist	
2006	Flushed Away	storyboard artist	uncredited
2007	Bee Movie	character designer	uncredited
