= Malcolm Dixon (actor) =

English actor (1934–2020)

- Born: 1934; Crook, County Durham, England
- Died: 9 April 2020 (aged 85); Blackpool, England
- Occupation: Actor
- Years active: 1966–1997
- Height: 124 cm (4 ft 1 in)
- Spouse: Anita Dixon
- Children: 2

Malcolm Watson Dixon (1934 – 9 April 2020) was an English actor. He is known for having played the role of Strutter in the 1981 film Time Bandits. He had many roles which took advantage of his 124 cm (4 ft 1 in) height, such as Ewoks and dwarfs.

== Early life ==
Malcolm Dixon was born in Crook, County Durham, in 1934, as the youngest of seven brothers and the only child with dwarfism. He was raised in Crook. His parents died when he was young and he outlived all his brothers.

== Career ==
Dixon's stature and physical abilities landed him work with Jim Henson's Creature Shop, where he worked in multiple films and television shows until becoming an independent actor. He starred in Time Bandits and also in Willy Wonka & the Chocolate Factory as an Oompa-Loompa (an uncredited role). He featured in many music videos for artists including David Bowie, Duran Duran and Spandau Ballet.

== Death ==
He died in Blackpool on 9 April 2020, at the age of 85.

== Filmography ==
Dixon had acted in over 30 film and TV productions, including:

Year	Title	Role	Notes
1966	Snow White and the Seven Dwarfs	Sleepy	TV movie
1971	Willy Wonka & the Chocolate Factory	Oompa Loompa	uncredited
1979	Black Jack	Tom Thumb's Army	
1980	Flash Gordon	Dwarf No. 1	
1980	Basil Brush	Goblin	
1980–1981	The Dick Emery Show	Small Man	2 episodes
1981	Time Bandits	Strutter	
1981–1982	The Goodies	Washing Machine / Dwarf	2 episodes
1982	The Dark Crystal	Additional Performer	
1983	Star Wars: Episode VI – Return of the Jedi	Leektar the Ewok Warrior	as Malcom Dixon
1985	Arena: An Absurd Notion	Slink	Video
1986	Labyrinth	Goblin Corps	
1987	Snow White	Diddy	
1988	Willow	Nelwyn Band Member	Uncredited
1997	Witch Way Love	Merlin	(final film role)
2005	100 Greatest Family Films	Himself	TV movie documentary

== Theatre ==
His main leading role in theatre was as Bilbo Baggins in an adaptation of J. R. R. Tolkien's The Hobbit at the Fortune Theatre in London, England, from 1986 to 1989. From 2000 to 2020, he was a regular in panto productions of Snow White and the Seven Dwarfs. His other theatre roles included:

- The Lion, the Witch and the Wardrobe at Phoenix Arts Centre, Leicester, England
- Peter Pan at The Palladium
- Sleeping Beauty on Ice in 1968 at Empire Pool, Wembley
