= Divinidylle =

Studio album by Vanessa Paradis
- Released: 27 August 2007
- Recorded: November 2005 – June 2007
- Genres: Pop; rock
- Label: Barclay
- Producers: Alain Chamfort; Matthieu Chedid; Franck Monnet

Vanessa Paradis chronology
Au Zénith (2001)	Divinidylle (2007)	Divinidylle Tour (2008)

Professional ratings
Review scores
Source	Rating
AllMusic	link
Canadian Explorer Online	link
Daily Star	(favorable) link
The Daily Telegraph	(favorable) link
The Guardian	link
The Independent	link
Le Figaro	(slightly favorable) link
Radio Canada	link
The Scotsman	link
Telerama	(slightly favorable) link
The Times	link

Divinidylle is the fifth studio album by French singer Vanessa Paradis, released on 27 August 2007 by Barclay. It was recorded between November 2005 and June 2007. Critical reception was favourable, with AllMusic suggesting that it was "likely Paradis' best album yet". The artwork for the album was designed by American actor Johnny Depp, Paradis' partner at the time.

The lead single, "Divine Idylle", was released to French radio in June 2007. According to Francophonie Diffusion, it was the most-played French single worldwide during 2007.

The track "Divine Idylle" was covered by Taiwanese singer Jolin Tsai under the title "Love Attraction" on the 2009 album Butterfly.

== Track listing ==
1. "Divine Idylle" (lyrics: Marcel Kanche, Georges Kretek, Matthieu Chedid; music: Matthieu Chedid)
2. "Chet Baker" (Jean Fauque, Matthieu Chedid) (Trumpet by Ibrahim Maalouf)
3. "Les Piles" (Thomas Fersen) (featuring -M-)
4. "Dès que je te vois" (Matthieu Chedid)
5. "Les Revenants" (Franck Monnet, Vanessa Paradis)
6. "Junior suite" (Didier Golemanas, Alain Chamfort)
7. "L'Incendie" (Didier Golemanas, Vanessa Paradis, Serge Ubrette, Matthieu Chedid)
8. "Irrésistiblement" (Brigitte Fontaine, Matthieu Chedid)
9. "La Bataille" (Franck Monnet, Vanessa Paradis)
10. "La Mélodie" (Franck Monnet, Vanessa Paradis)
11. "Jackadi" (Vanessa Paradis)
12. "I Wouldn't Dare" (Bill Carter, Ruth Ellsworth) (Bonus track for Japan only)
13. "Emmenez-moi" (Bonus track for Japan only)

+ Bonus track (on-line song)

1. "Emmenez-Moi" (Charles Aznavour)

== Charts ==
=== Weekly charts ===
Weekly chart performance for Divinidylle
Chart (2007)	Peak position
Belgian Albums (Ultratop Flanders)	36
Belgian Albums (Ultratop Wallonia)	1
European Albums (Billboard)	14
French Albums (SNEP)	1
Swiss Albums (Schweizer Hitparade)	6

=== Year-end charts ===
2007 year-end chart performance for Divinidylle
Chart (2007)	Position
Belgian Albums (Ultratop Wallonia)	37
French Albums (SNEP)	9

2008 year-end chart performance for Divinidylle
Chart (2008)	Position
French Albums (SNEP)	35

== Certifications ==
Certifications for Divinidylle
Region	Certification	Certified units/sales
Belgium (BRMA)	Gold	15,000^{*}
France (SNEP)	2× Platinum	400,000^{*}
Switzerland (IFPI Switzerland)	Gold	15,000^{^}
^{*} Sales figures based on certification alone.^{^} Shipments figures based on certification alone.
