= Just as Long as You Are There =

1993 single by Vanessa Paradis

Single by Vanessa Paradis

from the album Vanessa Paradis
- B-side: "Your Love Has Got a Handle on My Mind"
- Released: 12 July 1993
- Length: 3:25
- Label: Remark, Polydor
- Songwriter(s): Lenny Kravitz, Henry Hirsch
- Producer(s): Lenny Kravitz

Vanessa Paradis singles chronology
"Sunday Mondays" (1993)	"Just as Long as You Are There" (1993)	"Natural High" (1993)

Audio
- "Just as Long as You Are There" on YouTube

"Just as Long as You Are There" is a song by French singer Vanessa Paradis from her third album, Vanessa Paradis. It was produced by Lenny Kravitz and written by him together with Henry Hirsch. It was released as a single from the album on 12 July 1993 and charted in Iceland and the United Kingdom.

== Track listing ==
All tracks are written by Lenny Kravitz and Henry Hirsch.

CD single – Remark / Polydor 891 938-2
No.	Title	Writer(s)	Length
1.	"Just as Long as You Are There"	Lenny Kravitz, Henry Hirsch	3:25
2.	"Your Love Has Got a Handle on My Mind"	Lenny Kravitz	3:56

== Charts ==
Chart (1993)	Peak position
Iceland (Íslenski Listinn Topp 40)	35
UK Singles (OCC)	57
