= Samuel Benchetrit =

French writer, actor, & director (born 1973)

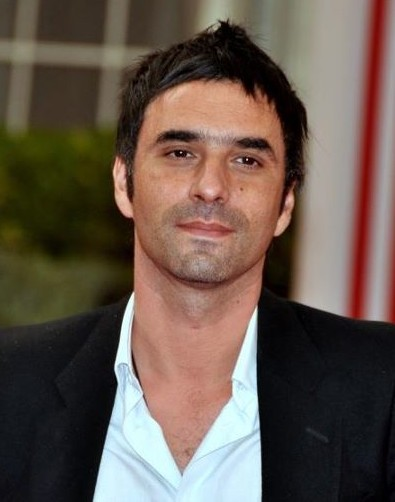
- Benchetrit in 2011
- Born: 26 June 1973 (age 53); Champigny-sur-Marne, Val-de-Marne, France
- Occupations: Author; film director; screenwriter; actor
- Years active: 2000–present
- Spouses: Marie Trintignant (m. 1998; died 2003) Vanessa Paradis (m. 2018; sep. 2026)
- Partner: Anna Mouglalis (2005–2012)
- Children: 2

Samuel Benchetrit (French: [samɥɛl bɛnʃətʁit]; born 26 June 1973) is a French writer, actor, screenwriter, and director.

== Biography ==
Benchetrit was born to a family of Romani, Sephardic and Ashkenazi Jewish ancestry.

At age fifteen, he left school to focus on photography.

Born in Champigny-sur-Marne, Benchetrit was married to French actress Marie Trintignant from 1998 until her murder by her lover Bertrand Cantat in 2003. On 17 April 1998 the couple had a child, Jules Benchetrit.

From 2005 to 2012 Benchetrit was in a relationship with French actress Anna Mouglalis; they have a daughter, Saül, born on 7 March 2007.

In 2016, while shooting his fifth film, Dog, Benchetrit fell in love with Vanessa Paradis, whom he directed. They married in June 2018.

In 2021, the comedy film Cette musique ne joue pour personne (English title: Love Songs for Tough Guys) was selected for the 2021 Cannes Film Festival.

== Personal life ==
From 1998 to 2003, Samuel Benchetrit was married to Marie Trintignant, whom he met in 1993; in the year of their marriage, they had a son, the future actor Jules Benchetrit, who appeared in Benchetrit's film Chez Gino and played one of the leading roles in Macadam Stories (Asphalte).

With Anna Mouglalis, he has a daughter who became an actress, named Saül, born on 7 March 2007. Both appear on the poster for his film I Always Wanted to Be a Gangster (J'ai toujours rêvé d'être un gangster).

Since November 2016, he has been in a relationship with French actress and singer Vanessa Paradis, whom he married on 30 June 2018 in Saint-Siméon. In August 2026 the couple released a joint statement announcing they had separated after 8 years of marriage.

== Works ==
=== Books ===
- 2000 : Récit d'un branleur (Tale of a Wanker)
- 2005 : Les Chroniques de l'Asphalte (Asphalt Chronicles) (tome I)
- 2007 : Les Chroniques de l'Asphalte (Asphalt Chronicles) (tome II)
- 2009 : Le Cœur en dehors
- 2010 : Les Chroniques de l'Asphalte, (Asphalt Chronicles) (tome III)
- 2015 : Chien Edition Grasset

=== Theatre ===
- 2001 : Comédie sur un quai de gare (Comedy on a Railway Platform)
- 2005 : Moins deux (This title is a rich pun, translating as: "ASAP", "Two Down", "Two Below", and "Minus Two")

=== Films ===
As director

- 2000 : Nouvelle de la tour L (short film) ("Story of Tower L")
- 2003 : Janis et John (Janis And John)
- 2007 : J'ai toujours rêvé d'être un gangster (I Always Wanted to Be a Gangster)
- 2008 : YSL film
- 2015 : Asphalte
- 2017 : Dog
- 2021 : Cette musique ne joue pour personne

As actor

- 2005 : Backstage (Director : Emmanuelle Bercot)
- 2012 : Un enfant de toi (Director : Jacques Doillon)
- 2014 : Les Gazelles (Director : Mona Achache)
- 2017 : Chacun sa vie et son intime conviction (Director : Claude Lelouch)
