= Tandem (song) =

1990 single by Vanessa Paradis

Single by Vanessa Paradis

from the album Variations sur le même t'aime
- B-side: "Ophélie"
- Released: May 1990
- Recorded: April 1990
- Studio: Studio Guillaume Tell, Suresnes; Local Studio, Rueil-Malmaison
- Genre: Rock
- Length: 3:30
- Label: Polydor
- Composer: Franck Langolff
- Lyricist: Serge Gainsbourg
- Producers: Bertrand Châtenet, Franck Langolff, Philippe Osman

Vanessa Paradis singles chronology
"Mosquito" (1989)	"Tandem" (1990)	"Dis-lui toi que je t'aime" (1990)

Music video
- "Vanessa Paradis - Tandem" on YouTube

"Tandem" is a 1990 song recorded by French singer Vanessa Paradis. Written by Serge Gainsbourg with a music composed by Franck Langolff, this rock song was released in May 1990 as the first single from Paradis' second album Variations sur le même t'aime, on which it is the seventh track. In France and the Netherlands, it was a top 30 hit and became one of Paradis' most popular songs.

== Music video ==
Directed by Jean-Baptiste Mondino, the music video for "Tandem" was shot in two days. It shows Paradis and several dancers are dressed with Lionel Cros' creations, and the topless woman who plays guitar is Emma Sjöberg. In February 1991, the video won a Victoire de la musique in the category music video of the year.

== Live and cover versions ==
Paradis performed "Tandem" during her five concert tours, and the live version recorded was thus included on the album Live (1993), Au Zénith (2001), Divinidylle Tour (only on the DVD, 2008), Une nuit à Versailles (2010) and Love Songs Tour (2013). In 2015, "Tandem" was covered by Shy'm who released it as the second single from her best of album À nos dix ans; this version peaked at number 171 in France.

== Chart performance ==
In France, "Tandem" debuted at number 36 on the chart edition of 30 June 1990, reached its highest position, number 22, in its five week, and remained for 14 weeks in the top 50. In addition, it peaked at number 35 in Belgium (Flanders) and number 22 in the Netherlands. On the European Hot 100 Singles, "Tandem" started at a peak of number 79 on 21 July 1990, a position it reached again three weeks later, and charted for a total of nine non consecutive weeks. Much played on radio, it appeared for 12 non consecutive weeks on the European Airplay Top 50, with a peak at number 23 in its fifth week.

== Track listings ==
- 7" single – Europe, Canada
1. "Tandem" – 3:30
2. "Ophélie" – 4:01
- CD single – France
1. "Tandem" – 3:30
2. "Ophélie" – 4:01
- 12" maxi – Europe, Canada
1. "Tandem" (extended remix version) – 7:31
2. "Tandem" (remix edited version) – 3:49
3. "Tandem" (single version) – 3:30
- CD maxi – Europe
1. "Tandem" (extended remix version) – 7:31
2. "Tandem" (remix edited version) – 3:49
3. "Tandem" (single version) – 3:30

== Charts ==
Chart performance for "Tandem"
Chart (1990)	Peak position
Belgium (Ultratop 50 Flanders)	35
Europe (European Airplay Top 50)	23
Europe (European Hot 100)	79
France (Airplay Chart [AM Stations])	2
France (SNEP)	22
Netherlands (Single Top 100)	25
Quebec (ADISQ)	3
