= Bliss (Vanessa Paradis album) =

2000 studio album by Vanessa Paradis

Studio album by Vanessa Paradis
- Released: 21 October 2000
- Genre: Pop
- Length: 51:12
- Label: Barclay
- Producer: Matthieu Chedid; Henry Hirsch; Franck Langolff; Vanessa Paradis; Vincent Ségal

Vanessa Paradis chronology
Live (1994)	Bliss (2000)	Au Zénith (2001)

Professional ratings
Review scores
Source	Rating
AllMusic	3.0/5 stars

Bliss is the fourth studio album by French singer Vanessa Paradis, released on 21 October 2000 by Barclay. It contains the single "Commando".

== Background and release ==
The album proved to be one of her least successful efforts, with none of the singles reaching the No. 1 spot in France as anticipated. However, it is notable because American actor Johnny Depp performed on some of the tracks. It also marks the recording debut of Lily-Rose Depp, Johnny and Vanessa's daughter, as she is featured on three tracks. Fans also note Bliss for its extensive artwork, all of which was hand-painted by Vanessa and Johnny, with use of watercolors.

Despite a weak chart run, Bliss spawned a few minor hit singles. The primary one was "Pourtant", which is often regarded as Paradis' most poetic work. Singles "Commando" and "Que fait la vie" were the other single releases from the album.

The album topped the French Albums Chart and spent 49 weeks on the chart.

== Track listing ==
1. "L'Eau et le Vin" (Alain Bashung, Didier Golemanas, Richard Mortier) – 4:36
2. "Commando" (Golemanas, Franck Langolff) – 3:40
3. "When I Say" (Matthieu Chedid, Paradis) – 3:57
4. "Pourtant" (Chedid, Franck Monnet) – 3:36
5. "Que fait la vie?" (Golemanas, Paradis) – 4:20
6. "Les Acrobates" (Monnet, Paradis) – 3:42
7. "La La La Song" (Gerry DeVeaux, Paradis) – 4:26
8. "L'Air du temps" (Chedid, Paradis) – 4:19
9. "St. Germain" (Johnny Depp, Paradis) – 2:36
10. "Dans mon café" (Golemanas, Langolff) – 4:30
11. "Firmaman" (Paradis) – 4:41
12. "La Ballade de Lily Rose" (Paradis) – 2:33
13. "Bliss" (Depp, Paradis) – 4:16

== Personnel ==
- Eric Bobo – percussion
- Matthieu Chédid – guitar, Mini Moog, shaker
- Pierre-Alain Dahan – drums
- Jon "JD" Dickson – French horn
- Mark Goldenberg – guitar
- Henry Hirsh – bass, Wurlitzer
- Rob Klonel – drums
- Nick Lane – trombone
- Norman Langolff – bass, Farfisa organ
- Vanessa Paradis – vocals
- Craig Ross – drums, guitar
- Vincent Ségal – cello
- Benmont Tench – keyboards
- Pete Thomas – drums, percussion
- Lee Thornburg – trumpet
- Bruce Witkin – bass, double bass, guitar
- David Woodford – saxophone

== Charts ==
=== Weekly charts ===
Weekly chart performance for Bliss
Chart (2000)	Peak position
Belgian Albums (Ultratop Wallonia)	18
European Albums (Music & Media)	19
French Albums (SNEP)	1
Swiss Albums (Schweizer Hitparade)	31

=== Year-end charts ===
Year-end chart performance for Bliss
Chart (2001)	Position
Belgian Albums (Ultratop Wallonia)	72
French Albums (SNEP)	87

== Certifications ==
Certifications for Bliss
Region	Certification	Certified units/sales
France (SNEP)	2× Gold	200,000^{*}
^{*} Sales figures based on certification alone.
