= Saint-Siméon, Seine-et-Marne =

Saint-Siméon
- Commune
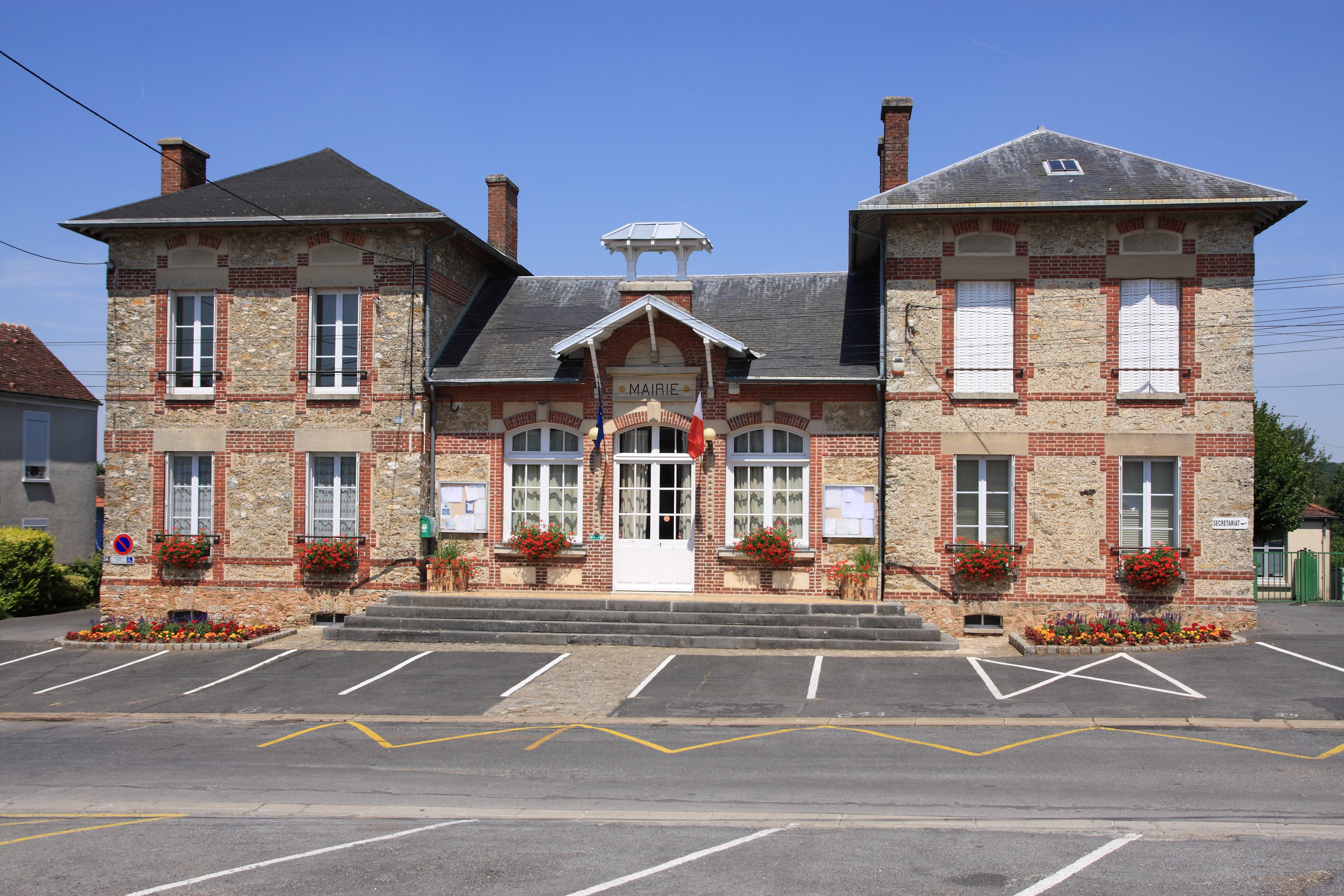
- The town hall in Saint-Siméon
- Location of Saint-Siméon
- Location within France Location within Île-de-France (region)
- Coordinates: 48°47′54″N 3°12′12″E
- Country: France
- Region: Île-de-France
- Department: Seine-et-Marne
- Arrondissement: Provins
- Canton: Coulommiers

Government
  - Mayor (2020–2026): Renée Chabrillanges
- Area^{1}: 12.3 km^{2} (4.7 sq mi)
- Highest elevation: 150 m (490 ft)
- Lowest elevation: 80 m (260 ft)
- Population (2023): 883
  - Density: 71.8/km^{2} (186/sq mi)
- Time zone: UTC+01:00 (CET)
  - Summer (DST): UTC+02:00 (CEST)
- INSEE/Postal code: 77436 /77169
- ^{1} French Land Register data, which excludes lakes, ponds, glaciers > 1 km^{2} (0.386 sq mi or 247 acres) and river estuaries.

Saint-Siméon (French: [sɛ̃ simeɔ̃]) is a commune in the Seine-et-Marne department in the Île-de-France region in north-central France.

== Demographics ==
Inhabitants of Saint-Siméon are called Saint-Siméonais.

== In popular culture ==
Vanessa Paradis married Samuel Benchetrit in June, 2018, in the town hall-school. Vanessa Paradis has a country estate nearby, and her late father owned a small restaurant in the quiet country commune.

== See also ==
- Communes of the Seine-et-Marne department
