= Maxou (song) =

Single by Vanessa Paradis

from the album M&J
- Language: French
- B-side: "Le bon Dieu est un marin"
- Released: December 1988
- Genre: Pop
- Label: Polydor
- Composer(s): Franck Langolff
- Lyricist(s): Étienne Roda-Gil
- Producer(s): Bertrand Châtenet; Philippe Osman; Franck Langolff

Vanessa Paradis singles chronology
"Marilyn & John" (1988)	"Maxou" (1988)	"Coupe coupe" (1989)

Music video
- "Maxou" on YouTube

"Maxou" is a song by French singer Vanessa Paradis from her debut album M&J. In December 1988, it was released as a single.

== Writing and composition ==
The song was written by Franck Langolff and Étienne Roda-Gil.

== Track listing ==
All lyrics are written by Étienne Roda-Gil; all music is composed by Franck Langolff.

7-inch single – 871 224-7 (December 1988)
No.	Title	Length
1.	"Maxou" (Remix)	3:37
2.	"Le bon Dieu est un marin"	4:20

CD maxi single – Polydor 871 225-2 (December 1988)
No.	Title	Length
1.	"Maxou" (Remix)	3:37
2.	"Soldat"	5:37
3.	"Le bon Dieu est un marin"	4:20

== Charts ==
Chart (1988–1989)	Peak position
France (SNEP)	13
Quebec (ADISQ)	1
