= Franck Monnet =

French singer-songwriter

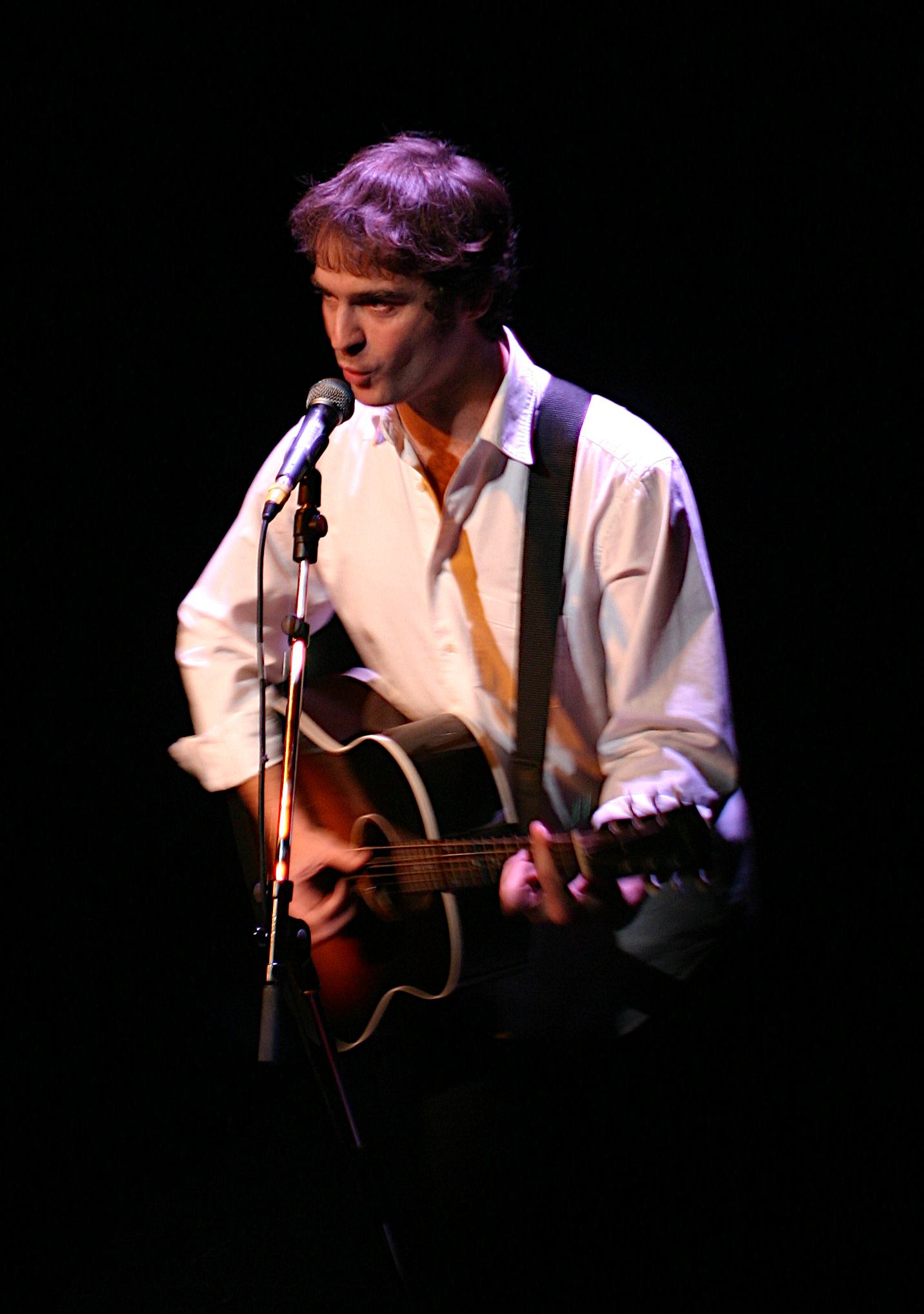
- Franck Monnet, Olympia, 2004

Background information
- Born: Franck Gilbert Yannick Monnet; September 13, 1967 (age 59); Le Mans, France
- Origin: France
- Genres: Chanson, pop
- Occupations: Singer-songwriter, composer, producer
- Years active: 1990s–present
- Awards: Grand Prix de l’Académie Charles Cros (2000)

Franck Gilbert Yannick Monnet (born 13 September 1967, in Le Mans) is a French singer-songwriter. He wrote songs for the following artists: Vanessa Paradis (collaboration with Matthieu Chedid for the albums Bliss, 2000, and Divinidylle, 2007), Tryo (2003), Murray Head (2006), Claire Diterzi (2005), Enrico Macias (2006), Emily Loizeau (with whom he produced the album L’Autre Bout du Monde in 2005).

In 2000, he was awarded the Grand Prix de l’Académie Charles Cros for his album Les Embellies.

He composed the soundtrack for the movie Mer Belle a Agiter (Pascal Chaumeil), produced by France 3 in 2004. In the same year, he was nominated for Prix Constantin for his album Au Grand Jour.

He was also a part of the jury of multiple festivals: Chorus des Hauts-de-Seine's Song Contest (2003), Créteil International Women's Film Festival (2008), Wellington Song Contest, with Dame Jane Pierard (2011), Randell Cottage Residency (2022).

As of 2013, he lives in New Zealand.

== Discography ==
Playa

- Released: 1998

Les embellies

- Released: 2000

Au grand jour

- Released: 2004

Malidor

- Released: 2006

Waimarama

- Released: 2014
- Singles: "Waimarama", "Différents"
