= Variations sur le même t'aime =

Studio album by Vanessa Paradis
- Released: 28 May 1990
- Recorded: April 1990
- Studio: Studio Guillaume Tell, Suresnes; Local Studio, Rueil-Malmaison
- Genre: Pop; rock
- Length: 50:21
- Label: Polydor; PolyGram
- Producer: Bertrand Châtenet; Franck Langolff; Philippe Osman

Vanessa Paradis chronology
M&J (1988)	Variations sur le même t'aime (1990)	Vanessa Paradis (1992)

Singles from Variations sur le même t'aime
- 1. "Tandem" Released: May 1990; 2. "Dis-lui toi que je t'aime" Released: November 1990; 3. "L'Amour en soi" Released: May 1991

Professional ratings
Review scores
Source	Rating
AllMusic	3.0/5 stars

Variations sur le même t'aime is the second album by French singer Vanessa Paradis. It was released in France in 1990, and contains the hit singles "Tandem" and "Dis-lui toi que je t'aime".

== Background and writing ==
For this album, she reunited with the team of writers and producers of her first album. She also collaborated with Serge Gainsbourg, who helped write and produce the album. Although the album was successful and charted higher than her debut, none of its singles matched the success of "Joe le taxi" from her first album.

Consistently termed her most cohesive work, Gainsbourg's lyrics frequently contain innuendo or double entendre, including the album's title. The highest-charting and biggest-selling single from the album was "Tandem".

"Variations sur le même t'aime" literally means "Variations on the same 'love you'" with the double meaning of "Variations on the same theme"; the title was coined by Gainsbourg as an allusion to his hit song with Jane Birkin, "Je t'aime".

The album is the last record Gainsbourg worked on for a female singer before his death in 1991.

Keeping in tradition with all of Paradis' albums, Variations sur le même t'aime features one English-language track, a cover of Lou Reed's "Walk on the Wild Side". The single "Dis-lui toi que je t'aime" remains the most performed song (live) from this album. Released in 1990, the album has remained in print and sells primarily in Paradis' native France as well as in French-speaking Canada.

== Tracklist ==
All songs written by Serge Gainsbourg (lyrics) and Franck Langolff (music), except where noted.

1. "L'Amour à deux" – 4:55
2. "Dis-lui toi que je t'aime" – 3:58
3. "L'Amour en soi" 5:07
4. "La Vague à lames" – 3:15
5. "Ophélie" – 4:01
6. "Flagrant délire" – 3:45
7. "Tandem" – 3:30
8. "Au charme non plus" – 3:50
9. "Variations sur le même t'aime" – 3:59
10. "Amour jamais" – 4:17
11. "Ardoise" – 4:00
12. "Walk on the Wild Side" (Lou Reed) – 4:28

== Personnel ==
- Marina Albert – backing vocals
- Antonietti, Pascault et Ass. – design
- Patrick Bourgoin – saxophone on "Au charme non plus" and "Walk on the Wild Side"
- Ann Calvert – backing vocals
- Bertrand Châtenet – arranger, engineer, mixing
- Philippe Cusset – additional engineer
- Jus D'Orange – backing vocals
- Alex Firla – assistant engineer
- Carole Fredericks – backing vocals
- Cyril Labesse – engineer on "L'amour en soi"
- Franck Langolff – arranger, guitar
- Jean-Jacques Milteau – harmonica on "L'amour en soi"
- Philippe Osman – arranger, backing vocals, bass programming, drum programming, guitar, keyboards, and synthesizer
- François Ovide – guitar on "Walk on the Wild Side"
- Didier Pain – artistic coordinator
- Paul Personne – guitar on "L'amour à deux"
- Gérard Prévost – bass guitar and double bass on "Walk on the Wild Side"
- Frédérique Veysset – photography

- Mixed at Studio Guillaume Tell

== Charts ==
Chart performance for Variations sur le même t'aime
Chart (1990)	Peak position
French Albums (SNEP)	6

== Certifications ==
Region	Certification	Certified units/sales
France (SNEP)	Platinum	300,000^{*}
^{*} Sales figures based on certification alone.
