= A Monster in Paris =

- French release poster
- Directed by: Bibo Bergeron
- Screenplay by: Bibo Bergeron; Stéphane Kazandjian
- Story by: Bibo Bergeron
- Produced by: Luc Besson
- Starring: Matthieu Chedid; Vanessa Paradis
- Edited by: Pascal Chevé; Nicolas Stretta
- Music by: Matthieu Chedid
- Production companies: EuropaCorp; Bibo Films; France 3 Cinéma; Walking the Dog; Umedia; uFilm; uFund; Canal+; France Télévisions; CinéCinéma; Le Tax Shelter du Gouvernement Fédéral de Belgique
- Distributed by: EuropaCorp Distribution
- Release date: 12 October 2011 (France)
- Running time: 90 minutes
- Countries: France; Belgium
- Language: French
- Budget: $32 million
- Box office: $26.6 million

A Monster in Paris (French: Un monstre à Paris) is a 2011 animated musical science fantasy film directed by Bibo Bergeron, and based on a story he wrote. It was produced by Luc Besson, written by Bergeron and Stéphane Kazandjian, and distributed by EuropaCorp Distribution, and it features the voices of Sean Lennon, Vanessa Paradis, Adam Goldberg, Danny Huston, Madeline Zima, Matthew Géczy, Jay Harrington, Catherine O'Hara, and Bob Balaban. Many plot elements are drawn from Gaston Leroux's novel The Phantom of the Opera. It was released on 12 October 2011. It was also produced by Bibo Films, France 3 Cinéma, Walking The Dog, uFilm, uFund, Canal+, France Télévisions, CinéCinéma, Le Tax Shelter du Gouvernement Fédéral de Belgique, and Umedia. Its music was composed by Matthieu Chedid, Sean Lennon, and Patrice Renson.

== Plot ==
In 1910, during the Great Flood of Paris, shy projectionist Emile Petit and his inventive, but clumsy friend Raoul travel to the Botanical Gardens to make a delivery. In the absence of the Professor who works there, the gardens are overseen by a proboscis monkey named Charles. Raoul experiments with two potions: "Atomize-a-Tune", which endows its users with operatic voices, and "Super Fertilizer", which makes plants grow to enormous sizes. When the two chemicals mix, an explosion occurs, resulting in a giant monstrous creature escaping the laboratory and terrifying the city's residents.

Lucille, a cabaret singer at the club L'Oiseau Rare, faces pressure from her aunt Carlotta to marry the wealthy but arrogant and narcissistic Police Commissioner Victor Maynott, a mayoral candidate. Following multiple sightings of the creature, Maynott launches an investigation led by his deputy, Pâté. One evening, Lucille comes face to face with the creature; though initially frightened, she discovers it is actually an enlarged flea with a melodious singing voice. She names the creature "Francœur" and allows him to live in her dressing room.

Maynott learns of Charles, Emile and Raoul's role in the laboratory explosion, but disregards it and awards them the Medal of Honor. Their reward includes seats at Lucille's next performance, where she shares the stage in a duet with a disguised Francœur. After the show, Lucille accidentally reveals Francœur's identity to Emile and Raoul. The next day, Maynott publicly declares his intention to hunt down and eliminate the monster. Fearing for Francœur's safety after a waiter named Albert comes close to revealing his whereabouts, Lucille concocts a plan to stage Francœur's death during an upcoming ceremony.

However, Lucille's plan backfires, leading to a frantic pursuit of Francœur and his friends through the streets of Paris. The chase culminates in a battle at the Eiffel Tower, where they meet Maud, Emile's co-worker and love interest, fellow by a gunshot is fired by Maynott, and Francœur's sudden disappearance leads everyone to assume that Francœur has been killed. Pâté arrests Maynott under orders from the Interior Minister, who is displeased with Maynott's mania. However, that night, Lucille discovers that Francœur is alive and has returned to his natural size. The Professor returns to the laboratory and restores Francœur to human size with a new mixture. After clearing up a misunderstanding from their youth, Lucille and Raoul become a couple.

In a mid-credits scene, the friends drop sunflower seeds into the river, which helps the Great Flood begins to decrease. In a post-credits scene, Albert, who falsely got arrested and sent to prison for allegedly lying to the police when giving away Francœur's whereabouts earlier, sings with his thieving inmate, who too got arrested for stealing, with Maynott miserably being forced to endure their appalling singing.

== Cast ==
Character	French	English
Francœur	Matthieu Chedid (as -M-)	Sean Lennon
Lucille	Vanessa Paradis	Vanessa Paradis
Raoul	Gad Elmaleh	Adam Goldberg
Victor Maynott	François Cluzet	Danny Huston
Maud	Ludivine Sagnier	Madeline Zima
Madame Carlotta	Julie Ferrier	Catherine O'Hara
Albert	Bruno Salomone	Matthew Géczy
Emile	Sébastien Desjours	Jay Harrington
Inspector Pâté	Philippe Peythieu	Bob Balaban

== Production ==
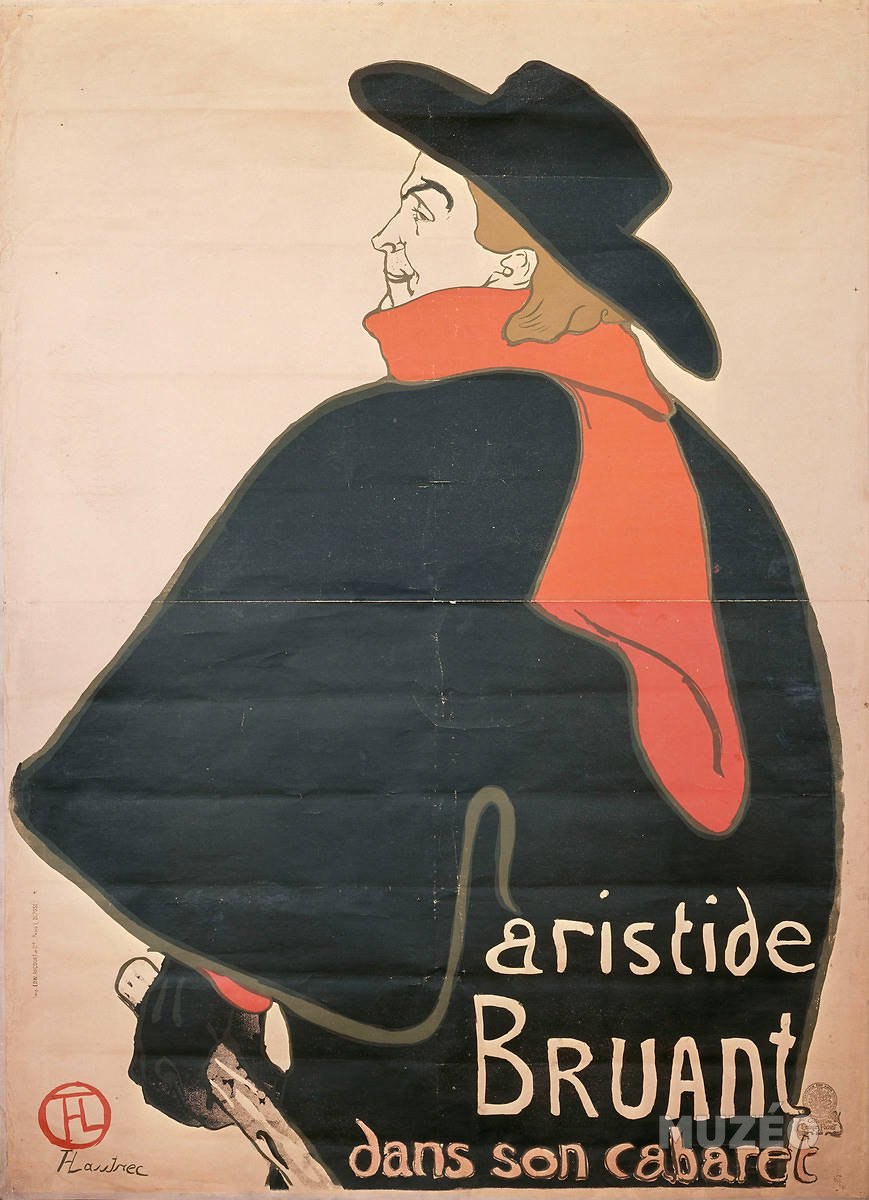
Aristide Bruant dans son cabaret, poster by Toulouse-Lautrec (1892). Bruant's stage costume inspires Francoeur's disguise in the film.

Director Bibo Bergeron conceived the project for A Monster in Paris in 1993, when he created his own studio, Bibo Films, which produced television series and advertising films; but he only really launched the project in 2005, towards the end of his stay in the United States, where he worked for DreamWorks Animation from 1997 to 2005. Bergeron wanted to make a film halfway between big American productions and arthouse films, and wanted to make it in France using his company Bibo Films. The first element of the movie decided was the setting; Paris, at the beginning of the 20th century, for which Bergeron gathered abundant documentation. Very early on, he had in mind the principle of a film close to a musical, as well as the concept of the central character, a monster with a big heart. Bergeron wrote alone a first synopsis of the scenario in August 2005, then he reworked it with Stéphane Kazandjian and together reached the first usable version of the scenario in the summer of 2006. In October 2005, Bergeron contacted singer Matthieu Chedid to compose the music for the film; Chedid came into contact with Vanessa Paradis shortly after, and the two artists worked together on the composition and recording of the soundtrack.

Soon after, visual aspects of the film were worked on for a year and a half. Bergeron says he was mainly influenced by Franquin's graphics of the characters, and draws his inspiration from impressionist painters like Alfred Sisley for the color moods and decorations. The appearance and gestures of the monster and the singer Lucille are respectively inspired by those of Matthieu Chedid and Vanessa Paradis, who lend them their voices in the French dubbing. The visual design of a touching monster turns out to be tricky. Its final appearance is the result of contributions from several members of the team: its grasshopper appearance was an idea from a designer on the team, while Bibo Bergeron had the idea of taking inspiration from the cabaret singer's costume. Aristide Bruant for the disguise Lucille made for him.

The search for financing for the film is being done at the same time. The budget of A Monster in Paris, 28 million euros, is very large for a French production, and therefore proves difficult to complete. Bergeron even had to put the project on hold for nine months because he struggled to raise funds; he is, fortunately advantaged by his past experience at DreamWorks. Production of the film was finally launched at the beginning of 2009 and lasted until the end of August 2010. A Monster in Paris is the third most expensive French film produced in 2010.

In order to meet the requirements of co-producer EuropaCorp, the English voices are recorded before the animation itself, which makes the film easier to sell in Anglo-Saxon countries; Bibo Bergeron supervised the choice of voice actors, and recording took place in Los Angeles. The French voices are recorded once the film is finished. Vanessa Paradis is the only actor to appear in both the English and French cast, providing the voice of Lucille in both versions.

The animation was done by an animation studio created in Montreuil by Bibo Films specifically for the needs of the project. It employed a team of 140 people. The storyboard went through several versions, and once the final version was established, it was then rigorously adhered to during editing, avoiding having to cut completed scenes. For the computer-generated image animation, animators used XSI software supplemented by plugins created for the needs of the film.

The film is distributed by EuropaCorp, whilst Entertainment One distributed it in Britain.

== Music ==
The soundtrack includes both songs and short clips from the film, in both French and English. The soundtrack of the English version was released in the UK a few days after the film's release on both CD and digital download. The album is credited to Vanessa Paradis & (-M-)

French version

1. "Les actualités (Interlude)" (0:27)
2. "La valse de Paris" (0:43)
3. "La Seine – Cabaret" (Vanessa Paradis -) (1:17)
4. "Emile et Raoul" (2:00)
5. "Sur les toits" (1:28)
6. "Maynott" (1:05)
7. "La rencontre" (1:45)
8. "Un monstre à Paris" (-M-) (2:18)
9. "Le baptême" (Interlude) (Lucille) (0:11)
10. "Francœur"/Lucille (2:13)
11. "Brume à Paname" (1:01)
12. "Cabaret" (1:02)
13. "La Seine" (Vanessa Paradis & -M-) (2:48)
14. "Perquisition" (0:59)
15. "Sacré cœur" (0:56)
16. "Papa Paname" (Vanessa Paradis) (2:23)
17. "Sur le fleuve"/"Tournesol" (1:15)
18. "Tour Eiffel infernale" (2:29)
19. "L'amour dans l'âme" (-M-) (1:30)
20. "Flashback" (1:39)
21. "U p'tit baiser" (Vanessa Paradis & -M-) (2:24)
22. "Funky baiser" (5:13)

English version

1. "Interlude – the News" (0:27)
2. "La Valse de Paris" (0:43)
3. "La Seine and I Cabaret" (Vanessa Paradis -) (1:17)
4. "Emile et Raoul" (2:00)
5. "Sur les Toits" (1:28)
6. "Maynott" (1:05)
7. "La Rencontre" (1:45)
8. "A Monster in Paris" (Sean Lennon) (2:18)
9. "Interlude – Lucille 'The Baptism' (0:11)
10. "Francœur – Lucille" (2:13)
11. "Brume à Paname" (1:01)
12. "Cabaret" (1:02)
13. "La Seine and I" (Vanessa Paradis & Sean Lennon) (2:48)
14. "Perquisition" (0:59)
15. "Sacré Cœur" (0:56)
16. "Papa Paris" (Vanessa Paradis) (2:23)
17. "Sue le Fleuve – Tournesol" (1:15)
18. "Tour Eiffel Infernale" (2:29)
19. "Love is in My Soul" (Sean Lennon) (1:30)
20. "Flashback" (1:39)
21. "Just a Little Kiss" (Vanessa Paradis & Sean Lennon) (2:24)
22. "Funky Baiser" (5:13)

== Reception ==
=== In France ===
The opinions of press critics are, on average, quite favorable and range from mediocre to excellent. The AlloCiné site gives A Monster in Paris an average rating of 3.4 on a scale of 5, based on eighteen press titles, only one of which (the daily 20 minutes) gives it a 5, while six give a score of 4 and ten a score of 3.

Among the best reviews is that of the free daily 20 minutes, which sees the film as a "little gem of poetry full of charm and songs", whose critic praises the "fanciful universe steeped in humor and originality". In Le Figaroscope, Emmanuèle Frois provides a very favorable review, where she appreciates the originality of the story, the pure moment of poetry created by the music of -M-, and the successful duo formed by Matthieu Chedid and Vanessa Paradis; she only regrets the small number of these songs. In La Croix, Corinne Renou-Nativel gives a very positive review, where she appreciates the visual universe of the film, the "chiseled" dialogues and the story "without downtime"; she concludes by indicating that "the notes of humor, the freshness of the images, the captivating duo formed by -M- and Vanessa Paradis, the poetry which surrounds everything make this film a nice meeting for adults and children.

In the television supplement of the weekly Le Nouvel Observateur (TéléCinéObs), Xavier Leherpeur gives the film two stars out of four: he considers it "brimming with visual discoveries, humor and poetry", and appreciates its universe and the music, but judges the final sequence "less grandiose than it could (and should) have been". In the daily Le Monde, Thomas Sotinel judges the story "strange and not very coherent" and believes that the film suffers from its lack of resources compared to big productions from American studios like DreamWorks; he concedes to the film a capacity to awaken the spectator's "appetite for the marvelous", but regrets that this appetite is often frustrated.

Among the most skeptical critics, Florence Colombani, in Le Point, recognizes in Bibo Bergeron "a real aesthetic sense" (which she particularly appreciates in the opening sequence of the film) and praises the "humanist message [of the film] towards the youngest"; but she finds the story "a little thin" and judges that ultimately "the film lacks the dramatic structure to completely hold the viewer". The critic from Ouest France, who gives the film two stars out of four, sees in the scenario "yet another variation on a somewhat worn-out theme" and regrets that the film concedes too much to Hollywood conventions, without sufficiently developing the French touch of the story, so that the result is judged "too wise and too [restrained] in its formatting"; the article however appreciates the quality of the original soundtrack.

=== International ===
In Britain, where the film was released in late January 2012, A Monster in Paris received a fairly good reception in the press. On Rotten Tomatoes, it received an aggregate score of 87% based on 23 reviews (20 "fresh" and 3 "rotten"). Favorable reviews credit the film with its graphics and successful songs as well as the poetry and originality of its script. Peter Bradshaw's review in the The Guardian, gave the film three stars out of five, and stated: "the film has something of Hugo's The Hunchback of Notre Dame, and also of King Kong, but it has a style eccentric of its own: a suitable children's film." Unfavorable criticism generally focuses on the weaknesses of the scenario, considered chaotic or too conventional.

=== Accolades ===
Annie Awards 2014

- Annie Award – Outstanding Achievement in Character Design in an Animated Feature Production – Christophe Lourdelet – Nominated

César Awards 2012

- César Award – Best Animated Film (Meilleur film d'animation) – Bibo Bergeron (director), Luc Besson (producer) – Nominated
- César Award – Best Original Music (Meilleure musique originale) – Matthieu Chedid, Patrice Renson – Nominated
