= Noce Blanche =

1989 film by Jean-Claude Brisseau

- Theatrical release poster
- Directed by: Jean-Claude Brisseau
- Written by: Jean-Claude Brisseau
- Produced by: Margaret Ménégoz
- Starring: Vanessa Paradis; Bruno Cremer; Ludmila Mikaël; François Négret; Jean Dasté; Véronique Silver
- Cinematography: Romain Winding
- Edited by: María Luisa García
- Music by: Jean Musy
- Production companies: Les Films du Losange; La Sept Cinéma; La Sorcière Rouge
- Distributed by: Les Films du Losange
- Release date: 8 November 1989 (France)
- Running time: 92 minutes
- Country: France
- Language: French

Noce Blanche (English: White Wedding) is a 1989 French romantic drama film written and directed by Jean-Claude Brisseau. It stars Vanessa Paradis, Bruno Cremer and Ludmila Mikaël, with François Négret, Jean Dasté and Véronique Silver.

== Plot ==
At a secondary school in Saint-Étienne, Mathilde Tessier, a moody 17-year-old with a reputation for truancy, arrives late for her philosophy lesson and is not admitted to class. Shortly afterwards, her teacher, François Hainaut, spots her at a bus stop where the young girl has collapsed. At her request, he drives her home. Later that day, he returns to check up on Mathilde and speak with her parents. She explains that her mother is hospitalized for attempted suicide and that her father lives in Paris. Over dinner, François urges Mathilde to attend classes from now on.

The next day, Mathilde excels in her philosophy class, explaining with clarity and rigour Freud’s theory of the unconscious to her fellow students. Impressed, Hainaut intervenes on her behalf at a disciplinary committee meeting, allowing her to stay at the school for a further two months.

Later that evening, François meets with Mathilde at her house where she explains she lost interest in schooling. He assists her with math homework but leaves in a huff when she furtively receives a classmate her own age.

Aware of François's jealousy, Mathilde makes overt advances by calling him at home to say goodnight, touching his hand during classes and other seductive measures. When she misses a day at school, François arrives at her house to warn of her inevitable expulsion. The warning is flipped in favour of seduction and they end up sleeping together. His wife, Catherine, soon realises that her husband is courting one of his own pupils.

Over the following weeks, Mathilde makes considerable progress at school in all subjects, and her exclusion is no longer an issue. During Easter, the lovers plan a two-week holiday together when Mathilde learns of her mother's second suicide attempt. She scraps their plans to spend time in hospital caring for her mother. Before leaving, she confesses to François that her two older brothers are drug dealers who live abroad. Destitute when they left and a substance abuser herself, she reveals how she survived as a prostitute for three years before quitting of her own accord.

Abandoned by Catherine, François clings to his telephone conversations with Mathilde, with whom he has now fallen deeply in love. When she asks him to divorce his wife, he realises that his affair with a 17-year-old is impossible, worries about the unavoidable scandal that would ruin his career, and backs down. The two lovers separate.

Mathilde, however, grows jealous of Catherine, first sending her threatening messages then arranging to have the bay windows of her bookshop smashed. Desperate to find a solution, Catherine delivers an ultimatum to François, demanding he choose between her and Mathilde.

Alarmed by her violence, François drags Mathilde from his class into an empty room to forcibly question her. But he soon calms down and, caught up in the moment, the two share a passionate kiss. A group of students happen to see them through a window having sex. Later, François is fired and Mathilde is expelled from school.

After Catherine decides to divorce François, he moves to Dunkirk to resume teaching. A year later, he receives a phone call from the police informing him that Mathilde is dead. When he comes to identify the body, the police inform him that Mathilde had rented a small apartment near his school with an unobstructed view of his classroom. Living as a recluse, she spent her days observing him. The coroner's report suggested she had wasted away from yearning.

Standing at the ocean's verge, François recalls Mathilde's last words written on the wall of her apartment: "The ocean, François, there is the ocean." The phrase references the last words of her mother's suicide note in which she described herself as "merging with the ocean".

== Cast ==
- Vanessa Paradis as Mathilde Tessier
- Bruno Cremer as François Hainaut
- Ludmila Mikaël as Catherine Hainaut
- François Négret as Carpentier
- Jean Dasté as concierge
- Véronique Silver as school counselor
- Philippe Tuin as supervisor

== Production ==
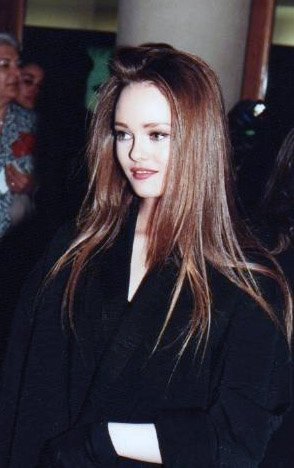
Vanessa Paradis made her acting debut in Noce Blanche as a 16-year-old.

Shot primarily in Saint-Étienne, Noce Blanche marked the acting debut of the 16-year-old Vanessa Paradis. According to the photographer Pierre Terrasson, Brisseau made Paradis rehearse 14 hours a day: "She often cried. It was morally difficult [for her]."

During the investigation that preceded the 2005 sexual-harassment trial of Jean-Claude Brisseau, Paradis' mother reported an incident that occurred during the filming of Noce Blanche. Brisseau had asked Paradis, who was a minor, to masturbate in front of him and his companion. Subsequently, Paradis demanded the constant presence of her mother on set for the rest of the production.

== Awards and nominations ==
- César Awards (France)
  - Won: Most Promising Actress (Vanessa Paradis)
  - Nominated: Best Actress – Supporting Role (Ludmila Mikaël)
  - Nominated: Best Poster (Dominique Bouchard)
