= Commando (Vanessa Paradis song) =

Single by Vanessa Paradis

from the album Bliss
- Language: French
- Released: 2000
- Genre: Pop
- Label: Barclay (Universal)
- Composer: Franck Langolff
- Lyricist: Didier Golemanas
- Producers: Matthieu Chedid, Vanessa Paradis

Vanessa Paradis singles chronology
"Gotta Have It (Live)" (1994)	"Commando" (2000)	"Pourtant" (2000)

Music video
- "Commando" on YouTube

"Commando" is a song by French singer Vanessa Paradis from her fourth studio album Bliss. It was written by Didier Golemanas and Franck Langolff and produced by Vanessa Paradis and Matthieu Chedid.

It was released as the first single from the album, debuting at number 43 in France and charting for 12 weeks in total. The B-side, "St Germain", was written by Paradis herself, with music by her and Johnny Depp, and produced by Paradis.

== Track listing ==
CD single – Barclay 587 834-2 (2000)
No.	Title	Length
1.	"Commando"	3:43
2.	"St Germain"	2:36

== Charts ==
Chart (2000)	Peak position
Belgium (Ultratip Bubbling Under Wallonia)	6
France (SNEP)	43

== Sales ==
Region	Certification	Certified units/sales
France	—	16,033
