= M&J =

Studio album by Vanessa Paradis
- Released: 15 August 1988
- Studio: Local Studio (Rueil-Malmaison)
- Genres: Pop; R&B
- Length: 49:29
- Language: French
- Labels: Polydor; PolyGram; Barclay
- Producers: Bertrand Châtenet; Franck Langolff; Philippe Osman

Vanessa Paradis chronology
M&J (1988)	Variations sur le même t'aime (1990)

Singles from M&J
- 1. "Joe le taxi" Released: April 1987; 2. "Marilyn & John" Released: June 1988; 3. "Maxou" Released: November 1988; 4. "Coupe coupe" Released: March 1989; 5. "Mosquito" Released: September 1989

M&J is the debut album of popular French singer and model Vanessa Paradis. It was released in 1988 and featured the hit single "Joe le taxi".

== Background ==
The album's lead single was the song "Joe le taxi". The song became a hit in France, where it charted at number one, and in the UK, Belgium, Germany, Sweden, and Norway, reaching the top 10. The album's other acclaimed single was the tribute to Marilyn Monroe titled "Marilyn & John".

Professional ratings
Review scores
Source	Rating
AllMusic	3.0/5 stars

The album marked the start of a collaboration between Vanessa Paradis and composer Franck Langolff that lasted until his death in 2006.

== Track listing ==
All songs written by Étienne Roda-Gil (lyrics) and Franck Langolff (music)

1. "Marilyn & John" – 5:48
2. "Maxou" – 3:50
3. "Le bon Dieu est un marin" – 4:28
4. "Mosquito" – 4:21
5. "Soldat" – 5:41
6. "Joe le taxi" – 3:56
7. "Coupe coupe" – 5:21
8. "Chat ananas" – 3:47
9. "Scarabée" – 6:25
10. "Marilyn & John" (English version) – 5:46

== Personnel ==
- Daniel Adjadj - backing vocals
- Patrick Bourgoin - saxophone
- Ann Calvert - backing vocals
- Bertrand Châtenet - arranger, engineer, mixing ("Le bon Dieu est un marin")
- Joshua D'Arche - bass guitar, keyboards, programming & synthesizer ("Joe le taxi")
- Freddy Della - harmonica
- Jacques Denjean - string quartet arrangement ("Scarabée")
- Jean-Luc Escriva - backing vocals
- Carole Fredericks - backing vocals
- Alain Ganne - saxophone
- Katherine Hibbs - photography
- Yvonne Jones - backing vocals
- Christophe Josse - bass guitar, keyboards, programming & synthesizer ("Chat ananas")
- Kiwi Concept - design
- Franck Langolff - arranger, guitar, harmonica
- Thierry Leconte - assistant mixing ("Le bon Dieu est un marin")
- Alain Lubrano - assistant mixing ("Le bon Dieu est un marin")
- Bruno Mylonas - mixing
- Philippe Osman - arranger, bass guitar, keyboards, guitar, programming & synthesizer
- François Ovide - guitar
- Anne Papiri - backing vocals
- Patrick Rousseau - percussion ("Joe le taxi")
- Patrice Tison - guitar

- Mixed at Studio Guillaume Tell, Suresnes

== Charts ==
Chart performance for M&J
Chart (1988)	Peak position
European Albums (Music & Media)	58
French Albums (SNEP)	13
German Albums (Offizielle Top 100)	61

== Certifications ==
Region	Certification	Certified units/sales
Canada (Music Canada)	Gold	50,000^{^}
France (SNEP)	Platinum	300,000^{*}
Switzerland (IFPI Switzerland)	Gold	25,000^{^}
^{*} Sales figures based on certification alone.^{^} Shipments figures based on certification alone.
