= Marilyn & John =

Single by Vanessa Paradis

from the album M&J
- Language: French
- B-side: "Soldat"
- Released: July 1988
- Genre: Pop
- Label: Polydor
- Composer(s): Franck Langolff
- Lyricist(s): Étienne Roda-Gil
- Producer(s): Bertrand Châtenet; Philippe Osman; Franck Langolff

Vanessa Paradis singles chronology
"Manolo Manolete" (1988)	"Marilyn & John" (1988)	"Maxou" (1988)

Music video
- "Marilyn & John" on YouTube

"Marilyn & John" is a song by French singer Vanessa Paradis from her debut album M&J. It was issued as a single soon after the album's release, in July 1988.

== Content ==
The song talks about Marilyn Monroe and John F. Kennedy.

There is also an English version with different lyrics. In the album's liner notes, it is commented upon as follows: "It's only broken English, but we like it."

== Writing and composition ==
The song was written by Franck Langolff and Étienne Roda-Gil.

== Track listing ==
All lyrics are written by Étienne Roda-Gil; all music is composed by Franck Langolff.

7" single – Polydor 887 640-7 (July 1988)
No.	Title	Length
1.	"Marilyn & John"	4:20
2.	"Soldat"	5:35

12" maxi single – Polydor 887 640-1 (July 1988)
No.	Title	Length
1.	"Marilyn & John" (Long Version)	5:54
2.	"Soldat"	5:35
3.	"Marilyn & John"	4:20

7" single – Polydor 887 651-7 (1988)
No.	Title	Length
1.	"Marilyn & John"	4:42
2.	"Marilyn & John" (English Version)	4:42

== Charts ==
Chart (1988)	Peak position
Europe (Eurochart Hot 100)	14
France (SNEP)	5
Germany (GfK)	35
Quebec (ADISQ)	1

== Certifications ==
Certifications for "Marilyn & John"
Region	Certification	Certified units/sales
France (SNEP)	Silver	200,000^{*}
^{*} Sales figures based on certification alone.
