= Vanessa Paradis (album) =

1992 studio album by Vanessa Paradis

Studio album by Vanessa Paradis
- Released: 21 September 1992
- Recorded: 1992
- Studio: Waterfront (Hoboken, New Jersey)
- Language: English
- Label: Remark
- Producer: Lenny Kravitz

Vanessa Paradis chronology
Variations sur le même t'aime (1990)	Vanessa Paradis (1992)	Live (1994)

Singles from Vanessa Paradis
- 1. "Be My Baby" Released: September 1992; 2. "Sunday Mondays" Released: January 1993; 3. "Natural High" Released: May 1993; 4. "Just as Long as You Are There" Released: July 1993

Vanessa Paradis is the third studio album and English-language debut by French singer Vanessa Paradis, released on 21 September 1992 by Remark Records. It contains the singles "Be My Baby" and "Sunday Mondays".

== Background and writing ==
Lenny Kravitz, who was dating Paradis at the time, produced and co-wrote the album. Some editions of the album contain the extra track "Gotta Have It", which is a tribute to Kravitz and is co-written by Kravitz himself. This was omitted on the US release of the album.

The album is noted for being the first time Paradis took creative control over her music. It is also noted for being innovative in its use of instruments, and for its replication of the 1960s soundscape on virtually every song. A one-hour television special on the making of the album was recorded in 1992 and aired on 28 March 1993 on French channel Canal+.

== Critical reception ==
Professional ratings
Review scores
Source	Rating
AllMusic	4.5/5 stars
Robert Christgau	(neither)

The album was one of her most successful and most critically acclaimed, proving to be both popular in France and the UK. It spawned several successful singles, including one of her most recognisable songs "Be My Baby".

== Track listing ==
No.	Title	Writer(s)	Length
1.	"Natural High"	Lenny Kravitz	3:21
2.	"I'm Waiting for the Man"	Lou Reed	3:25
3.	"Silver and Gold"	Kravitz	2:43
4.	"Be My Baby"	Kravitz; Gerry DeVeaux	3:41
5.	"Lonely Rainbows"	Kravitz; Henry Hirsch	2:33
6.	"Sunday Mondays"	Kravitz; Hirsch	3:56
7.	"Your Love Has Got a Handle on My Mind"	Kravitz	3:56
8.	"The Future Song"	Kravitz	4:55
9.	"Paradis"	Kravitz	3:03
10.	"Just as Long as You Are There"	Kravitz; Hirsch	3:24
11.	"Gotta Have It" (bonus track)	Kravitz; Hirsch; Craig Ross	2:17

== Personnel ==
- Tony Breit – bass guitar (tracks 1, 2, 9, 11)
- Debbe Cole – backing vocals (track 4)
- David Domanich – engineer
- Greg Di Gesu – assistant engineer
- Jamal Haines – trombone (track 6)
- Henry Hirsch – bass guitar, engineer, harpsichord, mixing, organ, piano, string arrangement, Wurlitzer
- Judith Hobson-Mitchell – backing vocals (track 10)
- Huart/Cholley – design
- Michael Hunter – trumpet (track 9)
- Lenny Kravitz – backing vocals, bass guitar, drums, Fender Rhodes, guitar, harmonica, horn arrangement, Mellotron, sitar, string arrangement, tambourine, vocal arrangement
- Richard Mitchell – backing vocals (track 10)
- Jean-Baptiste Mondino – photography
- B.J. Nelson – backing vocals (track 4)
- Didier Pain – executive producer
- Vanessa Paradis – backing vocals, tambourine (track 6)
- Antoine Roney – saxophone (track 9)
- Craig Ross – guitar
- Angie Stone – backing vocals (tracks 2, 10)

String quintet (tracks 1, 4, 5, 7)

- Eric Delente – violin
- Soye Kim – violin
- Sarah Adams – viola
- Allen Whear – cello
- John Whitfield – cello

== Charts ==
Chart performance for Vanessa Paradis
Chart (1992–1993)	Peak position
Austrian Albums (Ö3 Austria)	22
Belgian Albums (IFPI)	4
Dutch Albums (Album Top 100)	44
European Albums (Music & Media)	19
French Albums (SNEP)	1
German Albums (Offizielle Top 100)	53
Swedish Albums (Sverigetopplistan)	27
UK Albums (OCC)	45

== Certifications and sales ==
Certifications and sales for Vanessa Paradis
Region	Certification	Certified units/sales
France (SNEP)	Platinum	350,000
Switzerland (IFPI Switzerland)	Gold	25,000^{^}
United States	—	55,000
Summaries
Worldwide	—	1,000,000
^{^} Shipments figures based on certification alone.
