= Be My Baby (Vanessa Paradis song) =

1992 song by Vanessa Paradis

Single by Vanessa Paradis

from the album Vanessa Paradis
- B-side: "The Future Song"; "Paradis"
- Released: September 1992
- Length: 3:38
- Label: Remark; Polydor
- Songwriters: Lenny Kravitz; Gerry DeVeaux
- Producer: Lenny Kravitz

Vanessa Paradis singles chronology
| "Dis-lui toi que je t'aime" (1990) | "Be My Baby" (1992) | "Sunday Mondays" (1993) |

Music video
- "Be My Baby" on YouTube

"Be My Baby" is a song by French singer and actress Vanessa Paradis. It was the first single from Paradis' eponymous third studio album (1992) and was released in September 1992 by Remark and Polydor Records. It was the singer's first single in the English language and was written by her companion at the time, Lenny Kravitz, who also produced it. The song achieved great success in many countries, becoming a top-10 hit in Belgium, France, Germany, Ireland, the Netherlands, and the United Kingdom. The CD maxi contains Paradis' first hit single as a bonus track, "Joe le taxi". The accompanying music video for "Be My Baby" received heavy rotation on MTV Europe in January 1993.

== Background and release ==
Five years after her number-one debut single "Joe le taxi", Vanessa Paradis had another international hit with "Be My Baby": it was her second single to be released in the US and Australia. The song was released in France during September 1992 and was given a widespread European release on 30 September 1992, shortly after the album was issued. "Be My Baby" was released on 28 September in the United Kingdom.

The single covers were the same for all the countries, but the design was different for the US where the word 'Paradis' was in white, instead of maroon. A three-single CD maxi was released in limited edition in UK. The booklet contains photos from the music video. A promotional CD was published in the US and sent to the media.

== Track listings ==
- Standard
1. "Be My Baby" – 3:19
2. "The Future Song" – 4:54
- UK maxi-CD single
1. "Be My Baby"
2. "The Future Song"
3. "Joe le taxi"
- US cassette single

A. "Be My Baby" – 3:41
B. "Paradis" – 3:03

== Charts ==
=== Weekly charts ===
| Chart (1992–1993) | Peak position |
|---|---|
| Australia (ARIA) | 96 |
| Austria (Ö3 Austria Top 40) | 19 |
| Belgium (Ultratop 50 Flanders) | 2 |
| Europe (Eurochart Hot 100) | 6 |
| Europe (European Dance Radio) | 20 |
| Finland (Suomen virallinen lista) | 15 |
| France (SNEP) | 5 |
| Germany (GfK) | 10 |
| Ireland (IRMA) | 6 |
| Netherlands (Dutch Top 40) | 7 |
| Netherlands (Single Top 100) | 4 |
| New Zealand (Recorded Music NZ) | 26 |
| Sweden (Sverigetopplistan) | 11 |
| UK Singles (OCC) | 6 |
| UK Airplay (Music Week) | 2 |

=== Year-end charts ===
| Chart (1992) | Position |
|---|---|
| Belgium (Ultratop) | 11 |
| Europe (Eurochart Hot 100) | 87 |
| Netherlands (Dutch Top 40) | 80 |
| Netherlands (Single Top 100) | 100 |
| Sweden (Topplistan) | 83 |
| UK Singles (OCC) | 55 |
| UK Airplay (Music Week) | 20 |

| Chart (1993) | Position |
|---|---|
| Germany (Media Control) | 84 |
| Netherlands (Single Top 100) | 83 |

== Release history ==
| Region | Date | Format(s) | Label(s) | Ref. |
|---|---|---|---|---|
| France | September 1992 | 7-inch vinyl; 12-inch vinyl; CD; cassette | Remark | |
| United Kingdom | 28 September 1992 | 7-inch vinyl; CD; cassette | Remark; Polydor | |
| Japan | 25 October 1992 | Mini-CD | Remark; Polydor | |
