= Sunday Mondays =

1993 single by Vanessa Paradis

Single by Vanessa Paradis

from the album Vanessa Paradis
- B-side: "I'm Waiting for the Man"
- Released: April 1993
- Length: 3:56
- Label: Remark, Polydor
- Songwriter(s): Lenny Kravitz, Henry Hirsch
- Producer(s): Lenny Kravitz

Vanessa Paradis singles chronology
"Be My Baby" (1992)	"Sunday Mondays" (1993)	"Just as Long as You Are There" (1993)

Music video
- "Sunday Mondays" on YouTube

"Sunday Mondays" is a song by French singer Vanessa Paradis from her third album, Vanessa Paradis. It was produced by Lenny Kravitz and written by him together with Henry Hirsch. It was released as the second single from the album in April 1993 and charted in several European countries.

== Track listing ==
All tracks are written by Lenny Kravitz and Henry Hirsch.

CD single – Polydor 861 150-2 (April 1993)
No.	Title	Length
1.	"Sunday Mondays"	3:56
2.	"I'm Waiting for the Man"	3:21

== Charts ==
Chart (1993)	Peak position
Australia (ARIA)	161
Belgium (Ultratop 50 Flanders)	20
France (SNEP)	41
Germany (GfK)	51
Iceland (Íslenski Listinn Topp 40)	14
Netherlands (Dutch Top 40)	28
Netherlands (Single Top 100)	36
UK Singles (OCC)	49
