= Dis-lui toi que je t'aime =

Single by Vanessa Paradis

from the album Variations sur le même t'aime
- Language: French
- Released: December 1990
- Genre: Pop
- Label: Polydor
- Composer(s): Franck Langolff
- Lyricist(s): Serge Gainsbourg
- Producer(s): Franck Langolff

Vanessa Paradis singles chronology
"Tandem" (1990)	"Dis-lui toi que je t'aime" (1990)	"L'Amour en soi" (1991)

Music video
- "Dis-lui toi que je t'aime" on YouTube

"Dis-lui toi que je t'aime" (lit. 'Tell him yourself that I love you') is a song by French singer Vanessa Paradis from her second album Variations sur le même t'aime. It was written by Franck Langolff and Serge Gainsbourg and produced by the former.

In December 1990, it was released as the second single from the album, peaking at number 41 in France.

== Writing and composition ==
The song was written by Franck Langolff and Serge Gainsbourg.

== Track listing ==
All lyrics are written by Serge Gainsbourg; all music is composed by Franck Langolff.

7-inch single – Polydor 879 110-7 (December 1990)
No.	Title	Length
1.	"Dis-lui toi que je t'aime"	3:58
2.	"Ardoise"	4:00

CD single – Polydor 879 111-2 (December 1990)
No.	Title	Length
1.	"Dis-lui toi que je t'aime"	3:58
2.	"Ardoise"	4:00

== Charts ==
Chart (1990)	Peak position
France (SNEP)	41
Quebec (ADISQ)	37
