= Joe le taxi =

1987 single by Vanessa Paradis

Single by Vanessa Paradis

from the album M&J
- B-side: "Varvara Pavlovna"
- Released: 10 April 1987
- Studio: Local (Rueil-Malmaison)
- Genre: Pop
- Length: 3:54
- Label: Polydor
- Composer: Franck Langolff
- Lyricist: Étienne Roda-Gil
- Producer: Franck Langolff

Vanessa Paradis singles chronology
"La magie des surprises parties" (1985)	"Joe le taxi" (1987)	"Manolo Manolete" (1988)

Music video
- "Joe le taxi" on YouTube

"Joe le taxi" (lit. 'Joe the taxi driver') is a song written for French singer-actress Vanessa Paradis by Franck Langolff and Étienne Roda-Gil. The song topped the SNEP Singles Chart for 11 weeks, and, uncommonly for a French-language song at that time, was released in the UK and Ireland the following year, peaking at numbers three and two, respectively. The music video for the song was produced by Lili Balian, Jake Hertz, and Addie Calcagnini. The song was later included on her debut album, M&J (short for "Marilyn & John").

== Background and release ==
"Joe le taxi" is a French song about a taxi driver, Joe, who works in Paris. Joe is a pseudonym of Maria José Leão dos Santos (1955–2019), a Portuguese taxi driver and Parisian nightlife figure who fled the Estado Novo authoritarian regime to France in the 1970s due to her homosexuality.

The song emphasizes the notion that Joe seems to know all there is to know about the French capital including the whereabouts of all the little bars, all of the Parisian streets, the Seine, and bridges. The song's lyrics suggest that Joe enjoys drinking rum, has a passion for Latin music and his car ("saxo jaune"). Spanish-Cuban bandleader Xavier Cugat and Peruvian exotica singer Yma Súmac are also referenced in the lyrics.

== Chart performance ==
"Joe le taxi" debuted at number 21 on the French Singles Chart, reaching number one in its fourth week and remaining there for 11 weeks. It also reached the top five in the United Kingdom, Ireland and Norway and the top 10 in West Germany and Sweden. The single reached gold status in Belgium for 75,000 copies sold and has sold two million copies worldwide.

== Critical reception ==
Jerry Smith from Music Week wrote, "Out of the blue appears this intriguing Euro number that, with its breathy vocal and atmospheric backing, could capture the imagination given enough exposure." Johnny Dee from Record Mirror named "Joe le taxi" Single of the Week, adding, "There hasn't be all that many hits sung in French — Jane Birkin's "Je T'Aime" springs to mind. This purrs irresistibly in the same way, pre-pubescent vocals and a cha-cha beat that can't possibly fail to melt your heart. Sweet, sensuous, baby powder that will probably be giving me a headache by mid-March, but at the moment all is heavenly and I can't bare to be without it." [sic] William Shaw from Smash Hits commented, "Blow me down. A French record that's not crap. As a nation France has always been pathetically unsuccessful at pop. [...] But young Vanessa will change all that. She's just spent 11 weeks at the top of the French charts with this slow, wispy tune sung in French to an accompaniment of gratefully parping saxophones. It's really not bad at all."

== Music video ==
The 1987 music video for "Joe le taxi", directed by Jean-Sébastien Deligny, begins by glimpsing the side of Joe's taxi (a Chevrolet Nova), which is a New York taxi (dollar denominated taxi rates can be seen in black ink). The silhouettes of two men playing the saxophone in unison appear. Joe, who is black, is then seen in his taxi. Paradis, wearing an oversized peach sweater with the words "Cross Stage" and the number 26 emblazoned across the front and loose, faded blue jeans, dances and sings the song, next to a big yellow taxi similar to Joe's.

Joe seems to be driving around town, either looking out for customers or simply enjoying a scenic journey across a bright and beautiful Paris. The camera switches between Joe, Vanessa, and the two silhouettes playing their saxophones in perfect unison (in colour when focused on Paradis, in black-and-white when on Joe). The video ends with a front view of Joe's taxi.

Another music video for the song features Vanessa riding with Joe, in a blue Jeep, around Martinique, while singing the song.

== Track listings ==
7-inch single

1. "Joe le taxi" – 3:54
2. "Varvara Pavlovna" (Bertrand Châtenet/Franck Langolff) – 3:28

7-inch single – Spain

1. "Joe le taxi" – 3:54
2. "Joe el taxi" (Spanish version) – 3:38

12-inch maxi

- Side A
1. "Joe le taxi" (Extended version) – 5:30
- Side B
1. "Joe le taxi" – 3:54
2. "Varvara Pavlovna" – 3:28

12-inch maxi – Argentina

- Side A
1. "Joe le taxi" (Extended version) – 5:30
2. "Manolo Manolete" – 3:58
- Side B
1. "Manolo Manolete" (Extended version) – 6:15
2. "Joe el taxi" (Spanish version) – 3:54

Maxi CD

1. "Joe le taxi" – 3:54
2. "Manolo Manolete" (Extended version) – 6:15
3. "Joe el taxi" (Spanish version) – 3:54
4. "Joe le taxi" (Extended version) – 5:30
- Enhanced video
1. "Joe le taxi" – 3:54

== Credits ==
Personnel

- Joshua D'Arche: bass guitar, drum programming, keyboards & synthesizer
- Patrick Rousseau: percussion

Production

- Arrangement & produced by Franck Langolff
- Engineered by Bertrand Châtenet at Local Studio
- Mixed at Studio Delphine, Paris

Design

- Vincent Warin: photography
- Jean-Sébastien Deligny: video director

== Charts ==
=== Weekly charts ===
Weekly chart performance for "Joe le taxi"
Chart (1987–1988)	Peak position
Belgium (Ultratop 50 Flanders)	8
Europe (Eurochart Hot 100)	8
France (SNEP)	1
Ireland (IRMA)	2
Italy (Musica e dischi)	23
Italy Airplay (Music & Media)	18
Netherlands (Dutch Top 40)	23
Netherlands (Single Top 100)	25
Norway (VG-lista)	5
Quebec (ADISQ)	1
Sweden (Sverigetopplistan)	7
UK Singles (Official Charts)	3
West Germany (GfK)	8

=== Year-end charts ===
1987 year-end chart performance for "Joe le taxi"
Chart (1987)	Position
Belgium (Ultratop 50 Flanders)	73
Belgium (Ultratop 50 Wallonia)	2
Europe (Eurochart Hot 100)	33
France (SNEP)	5

1988 year-end chart performance for "Joe le taxi"
Chart (1988)	Position
UK Singles (OCC)	60
West Germany (Media Control)	73

== Certifications and sales ==
Certifications and sales for "Joe le taxi"
Region	Certification	Certified units/sales
Belgium (BRMA)	Gold	75,000
France (SNEP)	Platinum	1,000,000^{*}
Summaries
Worldwide	—	2,000,000
^{*} Sales figures based on certification alone.

== Remixes and cover versions ==
"Joe le taxi", in its French version, exists in a 'single version' 3:54 and a 'long version' 5:30.

When it was issued in South America and in Spain in April 1988, Vanessa recorded a Spanish version: "Joe el taxi".

Hong Kong Cantopop singer Priscilla Chan (陳慧嫻) released a Cantonese cover version in her album "Autumn Colours" (秋色) in 1988.

"Joe le taxi" has been remixed and covered several times, most notably by Stereo Total in 1999 and by The Divine Comedy in 2010, and by somewhat notable artists including Japanese singer Hanayo, Japanese singer Jun Togawa, Hong Kong Cantopop singer Priscilla Chan, and Brazilian singer-actress and television personality Angélica (whose version, "Vou de Táxi"—Portuguese for "I'm Going by Taxi"—, became a radio hit in Brazil, as well as her signature song). The same year, Mexican singer-actress Angélica Vale made her version "Voy en Taxi". It was also remixed by Sharlene Boodram of Trinidad and Tobago featuring Mista Vybe. Several different versions of the song are available on popular video-sharing website, YouTube. "Joe le taxi" has also been covered in its original language by the Japanese electropop singer Immi on her 2009 EP, Wonder. In 2010, Catalina Caraus, a singer from Republic of Moldova, registered a cover version of "Joe le taxi" with a music video, which was rated in top charts in Republic of Moldova and Russia.

Juli Chan, a Polish singer-songwriter, recorded a new version of Joe Le Taxi in 2021, which she performed live in March 2023 on Poland's largest commercial TV station, TVN. Juli Chan's version of Joe Le Taxi peaked at number three on French radio station RTS FM's charts and was broadcast on more than 30 French radio stations.
