= Étienne Roda-Gil =

French writer, lyricist (1941–2004)

Étienne Roda-Gil (1 August 1941 in Septfonds, Tarn-et-Garonne, France – 31 May 2004 in Paris) was a songwriter and screenwriter. He was an anarchist and an anarcho-syndicalist.

== Biography ==
Roda-Gil was born in the Septfonds internment camp to refugees who had fled Francoism at the end of the Spanish Civil War. His father, Antonio Roda Vallès, had been a militant with the CNT and a member of the Durruti column. In the early 1950s the family moved to Antony, a suburb of Paris, where he studied at the Lycée Henri IV. In 1959, when he was called to military service in Algeria, Roda-Gil instead fled to London, where he became active in anarchist and rock-and-roll circles. He returned to France after receiving a reprieve.

Roda-Gil participated in the Iberian Federation of Libertarian Youth and the Situationist International, and was an active participant in the events of May 1968.

He met singer Julien Clerc in a café in Paris's Latin Quarter in 1968, and became his songwriter. He also wrote for Mort Shuman, Angelo Branduardi, Barbara, Vanessa Paradis, Johnny Hallyday, Claude François, Juliette Gréco, and Malicorne, among others.

In 1989, he received the grand prix of songwriting from SACEM (La Société des auteurs, compositeurs et éditeurs de musique). He also won SACEM's Prix Vincent-Scotto in 1993.

Roda-Gil died in Paris on 31 May 2004 of a stroke.

== Family ==
Roda-Gil was married to painter Nadine Delahaye from 1965 until her death in 1990.

== Works ==
- RODA-GIL, Étienne (1956). L'Ami. La Nouvelle idéale. Toulouse: CNT.
- Roda-Gil, Etienne (1981). La porte marine : roman. Paris: Editions du Seuil. ISBN 2-02-005791-3. OCLC 17042809.
- Mala Pata (Seuil, 1992)
- Roda-Gil, Étienne (1995). Ibertao : roman. Impr. Firmin-Didot). Paris: Stock. ISBN 2-234-04434-0. OCLC 464160216.
- Paroles libertaires. Paris: A. Michel. 1999. ISBN 2-226-10138-1. OCLC 421716745.

Over 700 songs, as well as Juin 36 (a rock opera), Café, sang, sucre (a musical), Che Guevara (an oratorio), and ça ira (an opera).
