= Vanessa Paradis =

French singer, model and actress (born 1972)

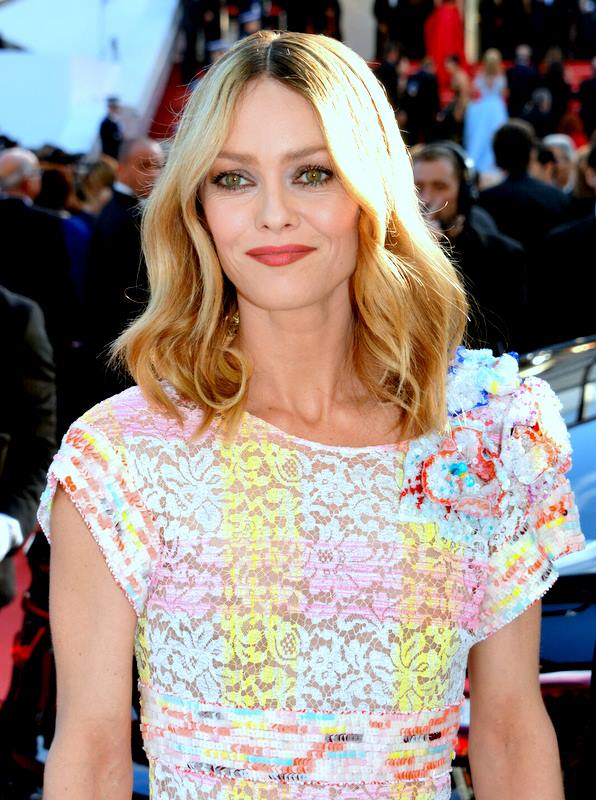
- Paradis in 2016
- Born: Vanessa Chantal Paradis; 22 December 1972 (age 53); Saint-Maur-des-Fossés, Val-de-Marne, France
- Occupations: Singer; actress; model
- Years active: 1980–present
- Spouse: Samuel Benchetrit (m. 2018; sep. 2026)
- Partner: Johnny Depp (1998–2012)
- Children: 2, including Lily-Rose
- Relatives: Alysson Paradis (sister)
- Musical career
- Genres: R&B; pop; rock
- Labels: Barclay; Polydor
- Website: vanessaparadis.fr

Vanessa Chantal Paradis (French pronunciation: [vanɛsa ʃɑ̃tal paʁadi]; born 22 December 1972) is a French singer, model, and actress. Paradis first achieved acclaim at the age of 14 with the international success of her single "Joe le taxi" (1987). At age 18, she was awarded France's highest honours as both a singer and an actress with the Prix Romy Schneider and the César Award for Most Promising Actress for Jean-Claude Brisseau's Noce Blanche, as well as the Victoires de la Musique for Best Female Singer for her album Variations sur le même t'aime.

Her most notable films also include Élisa (1995) alongside Gérard Depardieu, Witch Way Love (1997) opposite Jean Reno, Une chance sur deux (1998) co-starring with Jean-Paul Belmondo and Alain Delon, Girl on the Bridge (1999), Heartbreaker (2010) and Café de Flore (2011). Her tribute to Jeanne Moreau at the 1995 Cannes Film Festival during which they sang in duet "Le Tourbillon" became notable in French popular culture. In 2022, she was nominated for the Molière Award for Best Actress for her performance in the play Maman.

Her music has been cited as a source of inspiration for musicians and lyricists including Étienne Roda-Gil (1988), Serge Gainsbourg (1990), Lenny Kravitz (1992), Matthieu Chedid (2007), Benjamin Biolay (2013), Samuel Benchetrit and The Bees (2018). As a model, Paradis has appeared on more than 300 magazine covers worldwide including Vogue, Elle, Harper's Bazaar, Madame Figaro, Paris Match, Vanity Fair, Glamour, Premiere, and Marie Claire. Since 1991, she has been a spokesmodel for Chanel chosen by Karl Lagerfeld starting with the birdcage commercial "L'Esprit de Chanel" directed by Jean-Paul Goude. Paradis was made Officier (Officer) in the Order of Arts and Letters in 2011 and was named Chevalier (Knight) in the Legion of Honour in 2015.

== Early life ==
Paradis was born in Saint-Maur-des-Fossés, in Paris' suburbs, to interior designers André and Corinne Paradis. As a child she was enrolled in dance lessons, learned the basics of piano, and attended child model casting sessions. At the age of eight, Paradis appeared on the local television program L'École des fans, a talent show for child singers.

== Career ==
=== 1983–1991 ===
Paradis recorded her first single, "La Magie des surprises-parties", in 1983 and performed it at an Italian festival in 1985. Although not a hit, it paved the way for the song with which she became internationally famous, "Joe le taxi," composed by Franck Langolff in 1987, when she was 14. It was number one in France for 11 weeks and, unusually for a song sung in French, was released in the United Kingdom, where it reached number three. It was taken from her first album M&J (for Marilyn & John) which placed 13th in France, but did not enter the British chart.

In March 1989, at age 16, she left high school to pursue her singing career. Paradis released the album Variations sur le même t'aime in 1990, containing a remake of the Lou Reed song "Walk on the Wild Side". The album was written by French composer Serge Gainsbourg, whom she met when she received the best singer award at Victoires de la Musique, on 4 February 1990.

In 1990, she won the César Award for Most Promising Actress for her role in Noce Blanche.

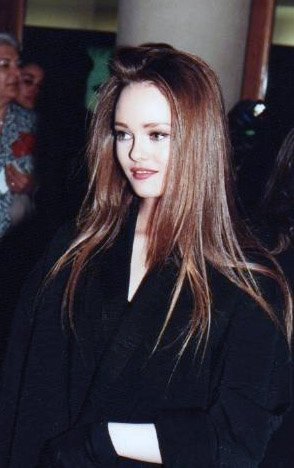
Paradis in 1991

In 1991, Paradis promoted the fragrance Coco for Chanel. In the advertisement, she was covered in black feathers, portraying a bird swinging in a cage. The advert was shot by Jean-Paul Goude. Paradis spoke of her continued admiration of Chanel in 2010 saying, "The more I know them, the more I love Chanel."

=== 1992–1996 ===
In 1992, Paradis moved to the United States to work with Lenny Kravitz, whom she was dating at the time. Paradis started working on a new album in English, a language she was now fluent in. Written and produced by Kravitz, the album, titled Vanessa Paradis, topped the French chart and briefly made the UK listings (number 45). One of the singles from it was "Be My Baby", which made number 5 in France and gave her another Top 10 hit in the UK, peaking at number six.

In March 1993, Paradis started her first international tour, the Natural High Tour; she performed in France, England and Canada. In February 1994, Live was released in France. In April 1994, Paradis filmed Élisa, under the direction of Jean Becker. Elisa was a big success in France and was released internationally.

=== 1997–2006 ===
In 1997, Paradis played in Un amour de sorcière with Jeanne Moreau and Jean Reno, before filming Une chance sur deux, with Alain Delon and Jean-Paul Belmondo. In March 1999, La fille sur le Pont, by Patrice Leconte was released. This movie was shot and released in black and white. In 2004, she promoted Chanel's new handbags called Ligne Cambon.

In 2005, she modeled for Chanel again for The New Mademoiselle handbag. In 2008, she modelled for Miu Miu. Meanwhile, she was included in the French children's album and concert Le soldat rose in 2006.

=== 2007–present ===
Paradis released a new album (Divinidylle) in 2007 which was released in the UK on 11 December (September in France). There are three versions (regular, limited edition, and the Christmas edition). She started the Divinidylle Tour in October. Some concerts were filmed, and a DVD/CD of the tour was released. Paradis won two Victoires de la Musique awards for this album in February 2008. Some of her later projects are a greatest hits CD (Best of Vanessa Paradis), which includes the commercial jingle "I love Paris in the Springtime"; she also starred in the animated film Un monstre à Paris, released in 2010.

Canadian film director Jean-Marc Vallée cast Paradis in a starring role in his film Café de Flore, in which she plays the single mother of a child with Down syndrome in the 1960s. The film was released in 2011, and Paradis garnered a Genie Award for Best Actress in a Leading Role at the 2012 Genie Awards.

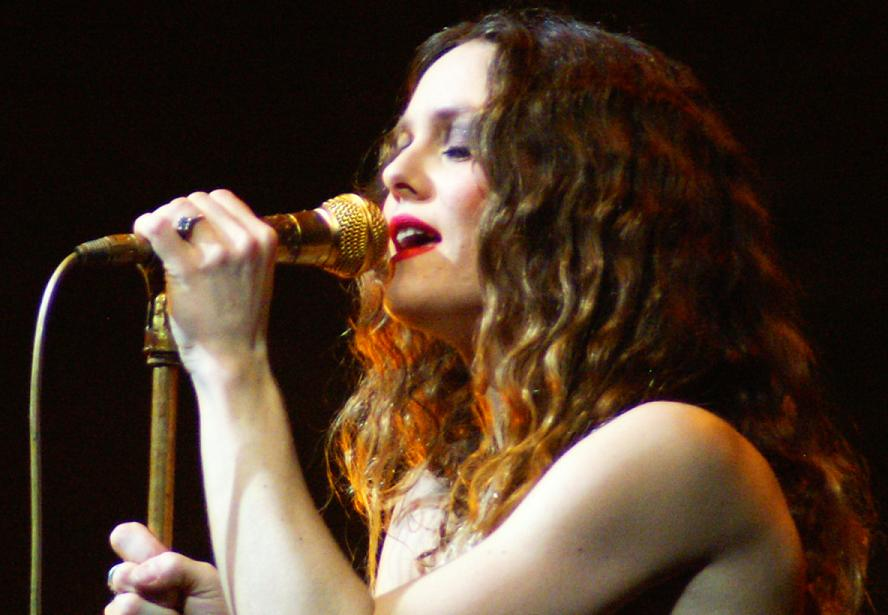
Paradis performing in 2007

Paradis released an acoustic album in November 2010 entitled Une nuit à Versailles. The album was recorded at L'Opéra of the Palace of Versailles during her Vanessa Paradis Concert Acoustique Tour. She also released a set of DVDs in 2010 called Anthologie which collected rare live performances and interviews from 1987 to 2007.

In 2010 she became the face of Chanel's new lipstick, Rouge Coco. She also became the face of their new handbag line, Ranger.

Her 2011 international tour included performances in the United States, Canada, the United Kingdom, Europe and Turkey.

In May 2013, Paradis released a new album, Love Songs, a double LP produced by French singer and producer Benjamin Biolay. The first single, Love Song, was also written by Biolay. The second single was Les espaces et les sentiments. The third single, Mi Amor, was written by BB Brunes frontman Adrien Gallo. Other people that have contributed to the songwriting of the album include Mickey 3D frontman Mickaël Furnon, as well as Johnny Depp and Lily-Rose Depp.

In 2016, Paradis co-starred in Yoga Hosers with her daughter Lily-Rose, as a history teacher. The same year, she was a member of the main competition jury of the 2016 Cannes Film Festival.

In September 2021, Paradis made her theatre debut in the play Maman, written and directed by her husband, Samuel Benchetrit, at the Edouard VII theatre in Paris. For her performance in the play, she was nominated for the Molière Award for Best Actress in a Private Theatre.

== Personal life ==
At 15, Paradis started dating 26-year-old French singer Florent Pagny. The relationship ended in 1991. From 1991 to 1996, she was in a relationship with Lenny Kravitz, who also produced her 1992 self-titled album. She dated French actor Stanislas Merhar from 1997 to 1998.

From 1998 to 2012, Paradis was in a relationship with American actor Johnny Depp. They have a daughter, Lily-Rose Depp (born 1999) and a son John "Jack" Christopher Depp III (Jack Depp), born in 2002.

In May 2014, at a Chanel show in Dubai, Vanessa Paradis confirmed her relationship with French singer Benjamin Biolay. They broke up in May 2015. In November 2016, she began dating Samuel Benchetrit, who directed her in his fifth film, Dog. In June 2018, Paradis and Benchetrit married in the town of Saint-Siméon. Vanessa Paradis has a country estate nearby, and her late father owned a small restaurant in the quiet country commune. In August 2026 the couple released a joint statement saying they had amicably split after eight years of marriage.

Paradis's sister, Alysson Paradis, is also an actress.

== Philanthropy ==
Paradis has been a member of the Les Enfoirés charity ensemble since 1993.

== Other activities ==
- In 1991, Paradis was approached by Calvin Klein to become the face of his new advertising campaign alongside Mark Wahlberg. She declined the offer, which made Klein's second choice, Kate Moss, famous.
- In 2001, Carla Bruni wrote several songs for Paradis, who found them too personal and encouraged Bruni to record them herself, resulting in the album Quelqu'un m'a dit released in 2002.
- In 2014, her song "Mi amor" was chosen for the TV advertising campaign for the Love Story fragrance from the house of Chloé directed by Mélanie Laurent.

== Discography ==
- M&J (1988)
- Variations sur le même t'aime (1990)
- Vanessa Paradis (1992)
- Bliss (2000)
- Divinidylle (2007)
- Love Songs (2013)
- Les Sources (2018)
- Le retour des beaux jours (2025)

== Concert tours ==
- Natural High Tour (1993)
- Bliss Tour (2001)
- Divinidylle Tour (2007–08)
- Vanessa Paradis Concert Acoustique Tour (2009–10)
- International Tour 2011 (2011)
- Love Songs Tour (2013)
- Tournée les sources (2019)

== Filmography ==
Film and television
Year	Title	Role	Notes
1989	Noce Blanche	Mathilde Tessier	
1995	Élisa	Marie Desmoulin	
1997	Witch Way Love	Morgane	
1998	Pleasure (And Its Little Inconveniences)	La voix du nouvel âge (voice)	
1998	Une chance sur deux	Alice Tomaso	
1999	Girl on the Bridge	Adèle	
2002	Lost in La Mancha	Herself	
2004	My Angel	Colette	
2005	The Magic Roundabout	Margotte (voice)	
2006	Le soldat Rose	Made in Asia	Television film
2007	La clef	Cécile	
2010	Heartbreaker	Juliette Van Der Becq	
2011	A Monster in Paris	Lucille (voice)	
2011	Café de Flore	Jacqueline	
2012	Dubaï Flamingo	Jackie	
2012	Je me suis fait tout petit	Emmanuelle	
2012	Cornouaille	Odile	
2013	Fading Gigolo	Avigal	
2014	Rio, I Love You	Mulher	
2014	French Women	Rose	
2016	Yoga Hosers	Ms. Maurice	
2017	Maryline	Jeanne Desmarais	
2017	Frost	Marianne	
2017	Chien	Hélène	
2018	Photo de famille	Gabrielle	
2018	Knife + Heart	Anne Parèze	
2020	Les Deux Alfred	Albane	
2021	Love Songs for Tough Guys	Suzanne	

=== Theatre ===
Year	Title	Role	Author	Director	Notes	Ref.
2021	Maman	Jeanne	Samuel Benchetrit	Samuel Benchetrit	Nominated–Molière Award for Best Actress in a Private Theatre	

== Awards and nominations ==
Year	Award	Category	Nominated work(s)	Result
1988	Victoires de la Musique	Best Song	"Joe le taxi"	Nominated
1988	Victoires de la Musique	Best New Female Artist	Herself	Nominated
1989	Victoires de la Musique	Best New Female Artist	Herself	Nominated
1990	Victoires de la Musique	Best Music Video	"Mosquito"	Nominated
1990	César Award	Most Promising Actress	Noce Blanche	Won
1990	Prix Romy Schneider	Most Promising Actress	Herself	Won
1990	Victoire de la Musique	Best Female Artist	Herself	Won
1991	Victoire de la Musique	Best Music Video	Tandem	Won
1993	Victoire de la Musique	Best Female Artist	Herself	Nominated
2000	César Award	Best Actress	La fille sur le pont	Nominated
2001	NRJ Music Awards	Best Francophone Album	Bliss	Nominated
2001	NRJ Music Awards	Best Francophone Female Artist	Herself	Nominated
2007	Ordre des Arts et des Lettres	Chevalier	Herself	Honored
2008	Trophée des femmes en or	Femme de Spectacle		Nominated
2008	NRJ Music Awards	Best Song	"Dès que j'te vois"	Nominated
2008	NRJ Music Awards	Best French Album	Divinidylle	Nominated
2008	Victoire de la Musique	Best Pop Album	Divinidylle	Won
2008	Victoire de la Musique	Best Female Artist	Herself	Won
2008	Globe de Cristal Awards	Best Actress	Herself	Nominated
2009	Victoire de la Musique	Best Music DVD	Divinidylle Tour	Won
2011	Victoire de la Musique	Best Female Artist	Herself	Nominated
2011	Globe de Cristal	Best Female Artist	Une nuit à Versailles	Nominated
2011	Globe de Cristal	Best Actress	L'arnacœur	Nominated
2012	Victoire de la Musique	Best Music Video	La Seine (with ‑M-)	Won
2012	Genie Award	Best Actress	Café de Flore	Won
2012	Jutra Award	Best Actress	Café de Flore	Won
2012	Cabourg Romantic Film Festival	Swann d'honneur	Café de Flore	Won
2012	Vancouver Film Critics Circle	Best Canadian Actress	Café de Flore	Nominated
2016	Legion of Honour	Chevalier	Herself	Honored
2017	UK Music Video Awards	Best Pop Video - International	"Did You Really Say No" (feat. Oren Lavie)	Nominated
2018	Brooklyn Horror Film Festival	Best Actress	Knife+Heart	Won
2022	Molière Award	Best Actress in a Private Theatre	Maman	Nominated
