= Franck Langolff =

French composer and guitarist

Franck Langolff, born Henri-Alain Langolff (6 May 1948 – 8 November 2006), was a French music composer. He was born on May 6, 1948, in Fez, Morocco, and died on September 8, 2006, in Rouen, France, at the age of 58. Langolff is known for his compositions such as Morgane de toi (1983), Putain de camion (1988) and of Joe le Taxi, which he composed for Vanessa Paradis.

== Biography ==
He lived in Morocco, where he was born, until he was ten, before moving to Canteleu in 1958. He began learning to play the harmonica, then the electric guitar and the bass guitar a few years later.

When he was very young, he would sometimes play in a garage in Le Grand-Quevilly with his lifelong friend, Alain, and a few other amateur musicians.

He began his career in the 1960s as a bassist and, above all, a songwriter for several regional bands (Les Vikingswith Freddy Della, Les Flamingoes, Les Punch, and Mardi sous la Pluie…). But it was with the Rouen-based band Mardi sous la Pluie that he achieved fleeting success in the early 1970s with their single “Descends dans la rue.” He composed three albums, including Normal in 1986, which features a track that Florent Pagny (in Europe) and Dan Bigras (in Quebec) would later cover: “Tue-moi.”

In the 1970s, he moved to Paris, where he became friends with the singer Renaud, for whom he composed several hits, such as “Morgane de toi,” “Fatigué,” and “Morts les enfants.” In 1986, he contributed to Sylvie Vartan album Virage.

In 1985, he composed the album Certitude* for actress Sophie Marceau with Étienne Roda-Gil when Didier Pain introduced him to his niece, Vanessa Paradis. For her, he wrote the music for “Joe le taxi,” the hit that launched Vanessa Paradis career and sold 3 million copies. It was her biggest hit.

He composed the music for the song “Éthiopie” with lyrics written by Renaud, which was released in March 1985.

In 1990, he produced Vanessa Paradis's second album, Variations sur le même t'aime, with Serge Gainsbourg.

He has also collaborated with Alain Souchon, Buzy, Johnny Hallyday, Patricia Kaas, Florent Pagny, Yannick Noah, Garou, Yta Farrow, Isabelle Boulay, Marc Lavoine, Melissa Mars, Bernie Bonvoisin, Clarisse Lavanant.

He died in 2006 from complications of lung cancer. He is buried at the Pinsaguel Cemetery (Haute-Garonne).

In 2010, Docteur Tom ou la Liberté en cavale was released, a musical tale based on his songs, featuring performances by Vanessa Paradis, Alain Souchon, Ours, Natalie Dessay, Cécile Cassel, Arthur H, Yannick Noah, Thomas Dutronc, Raphaël, Renaud, Liza Manili, and Claire Denamur. The CD project was conceived and produced by Norman Langolff (Franck’s son) and Gaby Concato (the son of Alain, Franck’s longtime friend).
