= Trintignant =

Trintignant (pronounced [tʁɛ̃tiɲɑ̃]) is a French surname derived from the Old French word trintignan, which means "rebellious". The name is most commonly found in the southern region of France, particularly in the Provence-Alpes-Côte d'Azur and Languedoc-Roussillon regions. The Trintignant family has produced several notable individuals in the arts, including actors, filmmakers, and writers. People with the surname include:

- Jean-Louis Trintignant (1930–2022), French actor
- Marie Trintignant (1962–2003), French actress, daughter of Jean-Louis
- Maurice Trintignant (1917–2005), French motor racing driver
- Nadine Trintignant (born 1934), French film director, former wife of Jean-Louis
