= Philippe Noiret filmography =

Philippe Noiret was a French film and theatre actor active from 1949 to 2006 – the year of his death.

This is his Filmography.

== Filmography ==
Year	Title	Role	Director	Notes
1949	Gigi		Jacqueline Audry	uncredited
1951	Olivia		Jacqueline Audry	uncredited
1952	Agence matrimoniale		Jean-Paul Le Chanois	uncredited
1955	La Pointe courte (a.k.a. The Short Point)	Lui	Agnès Varda	
1960	Zazie dans le Métro	Uncle Gabriel	Louis Malle	
1960	Ravishing	Maurice	Robert Lamoureux	
1961	Captain Fracasse	Hérode	Pierre Gaspard-Huit	
1961	Rendezvous	Inspecteur Maillard	Jean Delannoy	
1961	All the Gold in the World	Victor Hardy	René Clair	
1961	Famous Love Affairs	Le roi Louis XIV	Michel Boisrond	segment "Lauzun"
1962	Comme un poisson dans l'eau (a.k.a. Like a Fish in the Water)	Lucien Barlemont	André Michel	
1962	Le Crime ne paie pas	Clovis Hugues	Gérard Oury	segment "L'affaire Hugues"
1962	Thérèse Desqueyroux	Bernard Desqueyroux	Georges Franju	
1962	Les Faux Jetons	Bellini	Lucio Fulci	
1963	Ballade pour un voyou	L'inspecteur Fabien Mathieu	Claude-Jean Bonnardot	
1963	La Porteuse de pain	Jacques Garaud / Paul Harmant	Maurice Cloche	
1964	Mort, où est ta victoire ?	Brassy	Hervé Bromberger	
1964	Monsieur	Edmond Bernadac	Jean-Paul Le Chanois	
1964	Les amoureux du France	Narrator	Pierre Grimblat / François Reichenbach	voice role
1964	Clémentine chérie	Le directeur général	Pierre Chevalier	
1964	Cyrano and d'Artagnan	King Louis XIII	Abel Gance	
1965	Les Copains (a.k.a. The Buddies )	Bénin	Yves Robert	
1965	Lady L	Ambroise Gérôme	Peter Ustinov	
1966	A Matter of Resistance	Jérôme	Jean-Paul Rappeneau	
1966	The Sultans	Michou	Jean Delannoy	
1966	Le Voyage du père	Le voyageur mécontent	Denys de La Patellière	
1966	Tendre Voyou	Bibi Dumonceaux	Jean Becker	
1966	Who Are You, Polly Maggoo?	Jean-Jacques Georges	William Klein	
1967	Night of the Generals	Inspector Morand	Anatole Litvak	
1967	Woman Times Seven	Victor	Vittorio De Sica	segment "Snow"
1967	L'une et l'autre	André	René Allio	
1968	Very Happy Alexander	Alexandre	Yves Robert	
1968	Adolphe ou l'Âge tendre	Marc de Pourtalain	Bernard Toublanc-Michel	
1969	Clérambard	Hector de Clérambard	Yves Robert	
1969	The Assassination Bureau	Monsieur Lucoville	Basil Dearden	
1969	Justine	Pombal	George Cukor	
1969	Topaz	Henri Jarré	Alfred Hitchcock	
1969	Mr. Freedom	Moujik Man	William Klein	
1970	Les caprices de Marie	Gabriel	Philippe de Broca	
1971	Murphy's War	Louis Brezon	Peter Yates	
1971	The Most Gentle Confessions	Inspecteur Muller	Édouard Molinaro	
1971	We Are All in Temporary Liberty	Judge Francesco Langellone	Manlio Scarpelli	
1972	La Vieille Fille (a.k.a. The Old Maid)	Gabriel Marcassus	Jean-Pierre Blanc	
1972	Sweet Deception	Georges	Édouard Molinaro	
1972	A Time for Loving	Marcel Dutarte-Dubreuilh	Christopher Miles	
1972	Le trèfle à cinq feuilles	Alfred	Edmond Freess	
1972	L'Attentat (a.k.a. Plot)	Pierre Garcin	Yves Boisset	
1973	Le Serpent	Lucien Berthon	Henri Verneuil	
1973	La Grande Bouffe	Philippe	Marco Ferreri	
1973	Poil de carotte	François Lepic	Henri Graziani	
1974	L'Horloger de Saint-Paul (a.k.a. The Clockmaker)	Michel Descombes	Bertrand Tavernier	
1974	Touche pas à la femme blanche! (a.k.a. Don't Touch the White Woman!)	General Terry	Marco Ferreri	
1974	Les Gaspards	Gaspard de Montfermeil	Pierre Tchernia	
1974	Un nuage entre les dents	Malisard	Marco Pico	
1974	Le Secret (a.k.a. The Secret)	Thomas Berthelot	Robert Enrico	
1975	Playing with Fire	Georges de Saxe / Ses doubles	Alain Robbe-Grillet	
1975	Que la fête commence (a.k.a. Let Joy Reign Supreme)	Philippe II, Duke of Orléans	Bertrand Tavernier	
1975	Amici miei (a.k.a. My Friends)	Giorgio Perozzi	Mario Monicelli	
1975	Le vieux fusil (a.k.a. The Old Gun)	Julien Dandieu	Robert Enrico	
1976	Le Juge et l'Assassin (a.k.a. The Judge and the Assassin)	Judge Rousseau	Bertrand Tavernier	
1976	Monsieur Albert	Albert	Jacques Renard	
1976	A Common Sense of Modesty	Giuseppe Costanzo	Alberto Sordi	
1976	Il deserto dei Tartari (a.k.a. The Desert of the Tartars)	The General	Valerio Zurlini	
1976	Une Femme à sa Fenêtre (a.k.a. A Woman at Her Window)	Raoul Malfosse	Pierre Granier-Deferre	
1977	The Purple Taxi	Philippe Marcal	Yves Boisset	
1977	Tendre Poulet	Antoine Lemercier	Philippe de Broca	
1978	Who Is Killing the Great Chefs of Europe?	Moulineau	Ted Kotcheff	
1978	Le Témoin (a.k.a. The Witness)	Robert Maurisson	Jean-Pierre Mocky	
1978	La Barricade du point du jour	Eugène Pottier	René Richon	
1979	Due pezzi di pane (a.k.a. Happy Hobos)	Peppe Dorè	Sergio Citti	
1979	Rue du Pied de Grue	Le père	Jean-Jacques Grand-Jouan	
1980	On a volé la cuisse de Jupiter (a.k.a. Jupiter's Thigh)	Antoine Lemercier	Philippe de Broca	
1980	A Week's Vacation	Michel Descombes	Bertrand Tavernier	
1980	Pile ou Face	Louis Baroni	Robert Enrico	
1981	Tre fratelli (a.k.a. Three Brothers)	Raffaele Giuranna	Francesco Rosi	
1981	Il faut tuer Birgitt Haas (a.k.a. Birgitt Haas Must Be Killed)	Athanase	Laurent Heynemann	
1981	Coup de Torchon	Lucien Cordier	Bertrand Tavernier	
1982	L'Étoile du Nord (a.k.a. North Star)	Edouard Binet	Pierre Granier-Deferre	
1982	Amici miei – Atto IIº (a.k.a. All My Friends Part 2)	Giorgio Perozzi	Mario Monicelli	
1983	L'Africain	Victor	Philippe de Broca	
1983	L'Ami de Vincent (a.k.a. A Friend of Vincent)	Albert Palm	Pierre Granier-Deferre	
1983	Le Grand Carnaval	Étienne Labrouche	Alexandre Arcady	
1984	Fort Saganne	Dubreuilh	Alain Corneau	
1984	Souvenirs, Souvenirs	Le proviseur	Ariel Zeitoun	
1984	Les Ripoux (a.k.a. My New Partner)	René Boisrond	Claude Zidi	
1984	Qualcosa di biondo (a.k.a. Aurora)	Dr. André Feretti	Maurizio Ponzi	
1985	L'Été prochain (a.k.a. Next Summer)	Edouard	Nadine Trintignant	
1985	Le Quatrième Pouvoir	Yves Dorget	Serge Leroy	
1985	Les Rois du gag	Himself	Claude Zidi	uncredited
1986	Let's Hope It's a Girl	Count Leonardo	Mario Monicelli	
1986	La Femme secrète	Pierre Franchin, le peintre	Sébastien Grall	
1986	Round Midnight	Redon	Bertrand Tavernier	
1986	Twist again à Moscou	Igor Tataïev	Jean-Marie Poiré	
1986	Laughter in the Dark		Tony Richardson	
1987	La famiglia (a.k.a. The Family)	Jean Luc	Ettore Scola	
1987	Masques (a.k.a. Masks)	Christian Legagneur	Claude Chabrol	
1987	Gli occhiali d'oro (a.k.a. The Gold Rimmed Glasses)	Doctor Athos Fadigati	Giuliano Montaldo	
1987	Noyade interdite (a.k.a. Widow's Walk)	Inspecteur Paul Molinat	Pierre Granier-Deferre	
1988	Il frullo del passero	Gabriele Battistini	Gianfranco Mingozzi	
1988	Chouans!	Savinien de Kerfadec	Philippe de Broca	
1988	Young Toscanini	Dom Pedro II	Franco Zeffirelli	
1988	Cinema Paradiso	Alfredo	Giuseppe Tornatore	
1989	The Return of the Musketeers	Cardinal Mazarin	Richard Lester	
1989	La Vie et Rien D'autre (a.k.a. Life and Nothing But)	Commander Dellaplane	Bertrand Tavernier	
1990	Ripoux contre ripoux (a.k.a. My New Partner II)	René Boisrond	Claude Zidi	
1990	Dimenticare Palermo (a.k.a. The Palermo Connection)	Gianni Mucci	Francesco Rosi	
1990	Faux et Usage de faux	Anatole Hirsch	Laurent Heynemann	
1990	Uranus	Watrin	Claude Berri	
1991	Rossini! Rossini!	Gioachino Rossini	Mario Monicelli	
1991	Especially on Sunday	Amleto	Giuseppe Tornatore	segment "Il cane blu"
1991	J'embrasse pas (a.k.a. I Do Not Kiss)	Romain	André Téchiné	
1992	Zuppa di pesce	Alberto	Fiorella Infascelli	
1992	À nous deux	Toussaint	Henri Graziani	
1992	Max et Jérémie	Robert Maxendre	Claire Devers	
1993	Tango	François d'Amour	Patrice Leconte	
1994	Grosse Fatigue	Himself	Michel Blanc	
1994	La Fille de d'Artagnan (a.k.a. Revenge of the Musketeers)	d'Artagnan	Bertrand Tavernier	
1994	Il Postino: The Postman	Pablo Neruda	Michael Radford	
1995	Le roi de Paris	Victor Derval	Dominique Maillet	
1995	Les Milles	the General	Sébastien Grall	
1995	Facciamo paradiso	Bertelli, Father of Claudia	Mario Monicelli	
1996	Une trop bruyante solitude	Hanta	Véra Caïs	
1996	Les Grands Ducs	Victor Vialat	Patrice Leconte	
1996	Fantôme avec chauffeur	Philippe Bruneau-Teissier	Gérard Oury	
1996	Balthus Through the Looking Glass	Himself	Damian Pettigrew	
1997	Marianna Ucrìa	Duca Signoretto	Roberto Faenza	
1997	Les Palmes de M. Schutz	Monsieur Schutz	Claude Pinoteau	
1997	Soleil (a.k.a. Sun)	Joseph Lévy	Roger Hanin	
1997	On Guard	Philippe d'Orléans	Philippe de Broca	
2000	Le Pique-nique de Lulu Kreutz	Joseph Steg	Didier Martiny	
2002	Step by Step	Louis Chevalier	Philippe Blasband	
2003	Le Chien, le Général et les Oiseaux	Narrator	Francis Nielsen	voice role
2003	Father and Sons	Léo	Michel Boujenah	
2003	Les Côtelettes (a.k.a. The Chops)	Léonce Grison	Bertrand Blier	
2003	Ripoux 3	René Boisrond / Jean Morzini	Claude Zidi	
2005	Edy	Louis	Stéphan Guérin-Tillié	
2007	Trois amis	Serano	Michel Boujenah	final film role
