= Le Maître-nageur =

- Directed by: Jean-Louis Trintignant
- Written by: Vahé Katcha
- Starring: Jean-Claude Brialy; Stefania Sandrelli; Guy Marchand; Jean-Louis Trintignant; Moustache; Christian Marquand
- Cinematography: Jean-Jacques Flori
- Release date: 1979
- Language: French

Le Maître-nageur is a 1979 French comedy-drama film directed by Jean-Louis Trintignant.

== Cast ==
- Guy Marchand as Marcel Potier
- Stefania Sandrelli as Marie Mariani Potier
- Jean-Claude Brialy as Logan
- Moustache as Achille Zopoulos
- Jean-Louis Trintignant as The gardener of Zopoulos
- Christian Marquand as Paul Jouriace
- François Perrot as Maître Dalloz
- Serge Marquand as Alfredo
