= John Abbey (actor) =

American actor (1935–2010)

- Born: Edward John Abbey; June 21, 1935; Denver, Colorado, US
- Died: December 5, 2010 (aged 75); Denver, Colorado, U.S.
- Occupation: Actor
- Spouse: Elisabeth Defrance Abbey

Edward John Abbey (June 21, 1935 – December 5, 2010) was an American actor, long based in France. He was best known for portraying the title role in William Klein's Mr. Freedom.

== Life and career ==
Born and raised in Denver, Colorado, Abbey was a semi-professional baseball player before his acting career. He made his film debut with an uncredited part in the American film The Sandpiper (1965).

By the following year, he had moved to France, when he appeared in the World War II film Triple Cross. He played a supporting role as Mr. Lacs in Jacques Tati's Playtime. His most high-profile role was as the title character in the satire Mr. Freedom, directed by fellow American expatriate William Klein. His only other film role was as a CIA agent in It's Raining on Santiago (1975), Helvio Soto's docudrama about the Chilean coup d'état, though he also made a number of television and stage appearances.

Abbey was married to Elisabeth Defrance. He died on December 5, 2010 in Denver at the age of 75.

== Filmography ==
=== Film ===
- The Sandpiper (1965) - Trooper (uncredited)
- Triple Cross (1966) - Lang
- Playtime (1967) - Mr. Lacs
- Mr. Freedom (1968) - Mr. Freedom
- It's Raining on Santiago (1975) - CIA agent

=== Television ===
- Quand la liberté venait du ciel (1967, 2 episodes) - American pilot
- Les enquêtes du commissaire Maigret (1967, 1 episode) - William Crosby
- Un mystère par jour (1970, 1 episode) - American
- Le Dessous du ciel (1974, 4 episodes) - Laverne
- Au théâtre ce soir (1972-76, 4 episodes) - Various characters
