= Le massaggiatrici =

- Directed by: Lucio Fulci
- Screenplay by: Oreste Biancoli; Vittorio De Tuddo; Italo De Tuddo; Antoinette Pellevant
- Story by: Oreste Biancoli; Vittorio De Tuddo; Italo De Tuddo; Antoinette Pellevant
- Produced by: Ermanno Donati; Luigi Carpentieri
- Starring: Sylva Koscina; Cristina Gajoni; Valeria Fabrizi
- Cinematography: Guglielmo Mancori
- Edited by: Ornella Micheli
- Music by: Lallo Gori
- Production companies: Panda Società per L'Industria Cinematografica; Gallus Films
- Distributed by: Warner Brothers (Italy); Interfrance (France)
- Release dates: September 27, 1962 (Bari); July 19, 1965 (France)
- Running time: 95 minutes
- Countries: Italy; France

Le massaggiatrici (lit. 'The Masseuses') is a 1962 film directed by Lucio Fulci. The film stars Valeria Fabrizi who is a sex worker. After her car is stolen, she decides with her friends Iris (Cristina Gajoni) and Marisa (Sylva Koscina) to advertise their services under the guise of each of them being a masseuse.

The film was an Italian and French co-production between Panda Società per L'Industria Cinematografica and Gallus Films. It finished filming in August 1962.

While receiving a positive review in Variety, the film received more lukewarm reviews in the Italian newspapers La Stampa and l'Unità who found the film lacking in depth.

== Cast ==
- Sylva Koscina as Marisa
- Cristina Gajoni as Iris
- Valeria Fabrizi as Milena
- Marisa Merlini as Bice
- Ernesto Calindri as Parodi
- Luigi Pavese as Manzini
- Nino Taranto as the professor
- Philippe Noiret as Bellini
- Louis Seigner as Cipriano Paoloni
- Franco Franchi as Franco
- Ciccio Ingrassia as Ciccio

== Production ==
Le massaggiatrici was an Italian and French international co-production between the Rome-based Panda Società per L'Industria Cinematografica S.p.A. and the Paris-based Gallus Films.

Unlike the majority of Fulci's collaborations with Franco and Ciccio, the two have smaller roles in Le massaggiatrici.

Filming ended on Le massaggiatrici in late August 1962.

== Release ==
Le massaggiatrici was distributed by Warner Brothers in Italy with a 95 minute running time. It was released in Bari, Italy on September 27, 1962 followed by screenings in Turin on October 17, 1962 and the next year in Rome on January 12, 1963.

It was distributed in France with an 83 minute running time by the distributor Interfrance. It was released on July 19, 1965 under the title Les faux-jetons (lit. 'The Phonies').

== Reception ==
A reviewer in Variety described the film as a "fast-paced and exploitable comedy with strong prospects in depth." saying it should play well abroad based on the strength of its comedy that was strongly laced with double entendres."

A reviewer in La Stampa found that the film did manage give a few laughs, it ultimately brought to mind thoughts on the poor state of Italian comedy films. The reviewer continued that the film had a script founded on endless misunderstandings and puns pretending to be satire and other ideas they deemed to be tired. A reviewer in l'Unità also found it lacking in depth saying it was made for fun without reaching the vigor or nobility of satire.

French actor Philippe Noiret later said that Le massaggiatrici was the worst film he had ever made.

== See also ==
- List of Italian films of 1962
- Philippe Noiret filmography
