= Next Summer =

Next Summer may refer to:

- Next Summer (film), 1985
- "Next Summer" (song), by Damiano David, 2025
- "Next Summer", a song by Oh Land from the album Wish Bone, 2013
