= It Only Happens to Others =

1971 film by Nadine Trintignant

- French theatrical release poster
- French: Ça n'arrive qu'aux autres
- Directed by: Nadine Trintignant
- Written by: Nadine Trintignant
- Produced by: Claude Pinoteau
- Starring: Catherine Deneuve; Marcello Mastroianni
- Cinematography: William Lubtchansky
- Edited by: Nicole Lubtchansky; Carole Marquand
- Music by: Michel Polnareff
- Production companies: Les Films 13; Marianne Productions; Mars Film
- Distributed by: Les Films 13 (France); CIC (Italy)
- Release dates: 29 October 1971 (France); 17 February 1972 (Italy)
- Running time: 85 minutes
- Countries: France; Italy
- Language: French
- Box office: $6.5 million

It Only Happens to Others (French: Ça n'arrive qu'aux autres) is a 1971 drama film written and directed by Nadine Trintignant. The film was made in the wake of the death of Nadine and Jean-Louis Trintignant's daughter Pauline in 1969.

== Cast ==
- Catherine Deneuve as Catherine
- Marcello Mastroianni as Marcello
- Serge Marquand as Catherine's brother
- Dominique Labourier as Marguerite
- Danièle Lebrun as Sophie
- Catherine Allégret as mother in park
- Marc Eyraud
- Rosa Chiara Magrini as Marcello's sister
- Benoît Ferreux as little girl
- Marie Trintignant
- Catherine Hiegel
- Edouard Niermans as young man
- Andrée Damant as nurse
