= The Train (1973 film) =

1973 film)

- Directed by: Pierre Granier-Deferre
- Written by: Pierre Granier-Deferre; Pascal Jardin
- Based on: The Train by Georges Simenon
- Produced by: Raymond Danon
- Starring: Jean-Louis Trintignant; Romy Schneider; Maurice Biraud
- Cinematography: Walter Wottitz
- Edited by: Jean Ravel
- Music by: Philippe Sarde
- Production companies: Lira Films; Capitolina Produzioni Cinematografiche
- Distributed by: Fox-Lira
- Release date: 31 October 1973
- Running time: 95 minutes
- Countries: Italy; France
- Language: French

The Train (French: Le Train) is a 1973 French–Italian war drama film directed by Pierre Granier-Deferre and starring Jean-Louis Trintignant, Romy Schneider and Maurice Biraud. The film is based on the 1961 novel of the same name by Georges Simenon. It was shot at the Boulogne Studios in Paris and on location around La Rochelle, Moulins and the Ardennes. The film's sets were designed by the art director Jacques Saulnier.

== Plot ==
In May 1940 a packed train takes refugees from a French village near the Belgian border fleeing advancing German forces. The passengers include Julien, a short-sighted radio repairer, his daughter and pregnant wife. The women are assigned to a carriage for women at the front while he has to scramble into a cattle truck at the rear. There he becomes entranced by a mysterious and beautiful young woman travelling alone.

At a station, the train is split and he is separated from his wife and daughter. As his half of the train slowly continues across war-torn France, sometimes bombed and strafed by German aircraft, he and the silent woman gradually become intimate and eventually lovers. He learns that she is a German named Anna, that she is Jewish and that her husband was taken by the Nazis two years ago.

When the train finishes at La Rochelle, he gets her fresh papers as his wife. Then he discovers that his real wife and daughter are already there in a hospital with his newborn son. Anna quietly walks away through wolf-whistling German troops.

Three years later, back in his village with his family, Julien is called into the police station. A Jewish woman in the Resistance has been captured with false papers issued in La Rochelle in the name of his wife. He professes ignorance, but the inspector then calls the woman in. For a while the two pretend not to know each other, until Julien eventually gives her a last silent caress.

== Cast ==
- Jean-Louis Trintignant as Julien Maroyeur
- Romy Schneider as Anna Küpfer
- Maurice Biraud as Maurice
- Régine as Julie
- Niké Arrighi as Monique Maroyeur
- Serge Marquand as Le moustachu
- Franco Mazzieri as le maquignon
- Paul Amiot as François "Verdun"
- Jean Lescot as René
- Jean-Pierre Castaldi as The sergent
- Roger Ibáñez as L'étranger
- Anne Wiazemsky as La jeune mère au bébé
- Paul Le Person as Le commissaire
- Henri Attal as Le chauffeur
- Pierre Collet as Le maire

== See also ==
- The Train (1964 film) with Burt Lancaster

== Bibliography ==
- Bandhauer, Andrea & Royer, Michelle (ed.) Stars in World Cinema: Screen Icons and Star Systems Across Cultures. Bloomsbury Publishing, 2015.
