= Colette, une femme libre =

French television miniseries

- Written by: Marie Trintignant; Nadine Trintignant
- Directed by: Nadine Trintignant
- Starring: Marie Trintignant; Wladimir Yordanoff; Lambert Wilson; Jacques Higelin; Lio; Catherine Jacob
- Music by: Philippe Sarde
- Country of origin: France
- No. of episodes: 2

Production
- Producers: Nora Melhli; Jérôme Minet; Robertas Urbonas; Arlette Zylberberg
- Cinematography: François Catonné
- Editor: Nicole Lubtchansky
- Running time: 115 minutes

Original release
- Network: France 2
- Release: 26 April – 27 April 2004

Colette, une femme libre is a 2004 biographical miniseries which explored the life of Colette.

== Cast ==
- Marie Trintignant as Colette
- Wladimir Yordanoff as Henry Gauthier-Villars
- Lambert Wilson as Henry de Jouvenel
- Barbara Schulz as Polaire
- Rüdiger Vogler as Captain Colette
- Jacques Higelin as Georges Wague
- Lio as Marguerite Moreno
- Catherine Jacob as Missy
- Caroline Proust as Lotte
- Marie-José Nat as Sido
- Chiara Caselli as Georgie Duval
- Jean-Michel Fête as Léo
- Yves Lambrecht as Achille
- Roman Kolinka as Bertrand
- Ruta Latinyte as Meg
- Sergio Peris-Mencheta as Fred
- Carole Richert as Isabelle
- Arturas Zukauskas as Agent Choisy
- Dominique Besnehard

== Production ==
This is the last film of Marie Trintignant, who was killed by her then-boyfriend Bertrand Cantat during the shooting in July 2003.

== Awards ==
Year	Award	Category	Recipient	Result
2004	Biarritz International Festival of Audiovisual Programming	TV series and Serials: Actress	Marie Trintignant	Won
