= Serge Marquand =

French actor (1930–2004)

- Born: Serge Paul Gabriel Marquand; 12 March 1930; Marseille, Bouches-du-Rhône, France
- Died: 4 September 2004 (aged 74); Paris, France
- Occupation: Actor
- Years active: 1959–2001
- Relatives: Christian Marquand (brother); Nadine Trintignant (sister); Marie Trintignant (niece)

Serge Paul Gabriel Marquand (12 March 1930 – 4 September 2004) was a French actor.

== Biography ==
Marquand was born in Marseille, Bouches-du-Rhône. He was the brother of actor Christian Marquand and filmmaker Nadine Trintignant. He died of acute leukemia on 4 September 2004.

== Filmography ==
- 1959: Les Liaisons dangereuses (by Roger Vadim) - Un skieur (uncredited)
- 1960: Et mourir de plaisir (by Roger Vadim) - Giuseppe
- 1961: Pleins feux sur l'assassin (by Georges Franju) - Yvan
- 1961: La Bride sur le cou (by Roger Vadim) - Prince
- 1961: Les Trois Mousquetaires (in two parts, Les Ferrets de la reine and La Revanche de Milady) (by Bernard Borderie)
- 1961: Tintin and the Golden Fleece (by Jean-Jacques Vierne) - Le Facteur
- 1961: Les Parisiennes (sketch "Ella", by Jacques Poitrenaud) - Chauffeur de taxi (segment "Ella")
- 1961: Ca c'est la vie (by Claude Choublier) - Le jeune employé
- 1963: Les Bricoleurs (by Jean Girault) - Le chasseur du professeur
- 1963: Le Vice et la vertu (by Roger Vadim) - Ivan
- 1963: L'Abominable homme des douanes (by Marc Allégret) - Arnakos' lawyer
- 1963: Les Grands chemins (by Christian Marquand) - Mechanic
- 1963: Méfiez-vous, mesdames (Un monsieur bien sous tous rapports) (by André Hunebelle) - Paulo
- 1964: La Mort d'un tueur (by Robert Hossein)
- 1964: La Ronde (by Roger Vadim)
- 1964: Massacre at Marble City (by Paul Martin) - Fielding
- 1964: Angélique marquise des anges (by Bernard Borderie) - Jactance
- 1965: Black Eagle of Santa Fe (Die schwarzen Adler von Santa Fe) (by Ernst Hofbauer and Alberto Cardone) - Blacky James
- 1965: Marvelous Angelique (by Bernard Borderie) - Jactance
- 1965: Compartiment tueurs (by Costa-Gavras) - Un amant de Georgette (uncredited)
- 1965: Le Chant du monde (by Marcel Camus) - Le neveu
- 1965: Le Reflux (by Paul Gégauff) (not on general release)
- 1966: 3 cavaliers pour Fort Yuma (Per pochi dollari encora) (by Giorgio Ferroni) - Stagecoach Passenger (uncredited)
- 1967: Le Recherché (Wanted) (by Giorgio Ferroni) - Frank Lloyd
- 1968: Trahison à Stockholm (Rapporto Fuller, base Stoccolma) (by Sergio Grieco) - Bonjasky
- 1968: Histoires extraordinaires (sketch "Metzengerstein", by Roger Vadim) - Hugues (segment "Metzengerstein")
- 1968: Negresco (by Klaus Lemke) - Borell
- 1968: Barbarella (by Roger Vadim) - Captain Sun
- 1968: The Cats (I bastardi) (by Duccio Tessari) - Jimmy
- 1969: Cemetery Without Crosses (by Robert Hossein) - Larry Rogers
- 1969: Le Voleur de crimes (by Nadine Trintignant) - Guieff, l'ami de Christian
- 1969: La Maison de campagne (by Jean Girault) - Le taupier
- 1969: Gli specialisti (by Sergio Corbucci) - Boot
- 1970: Dernier domicile connu (by José Giovanni) - Le gueulard (uncredited)
- 1971: Les Stances a Sophie (by Moshé Mizrahi) - Jean-Pierre
- 1971: Ca n'arrive qu'aux autres (by Nadine Trintignant) - The Brother
- 1972: What a flash (by Jean-Michel Barjol)
- 1973: Les Gants blancs du diable (by Laszlo Szabo) - Serge
- 1973: Défense de savoir (by Nadine Trintignant)
- 1973: The Train (by Pierre Granier-Deferre) - Moustachu
- 1974: Le Passager (Caravan to Vaccares) (by Geoffrey Reeve)
- 1975: Le Jeu avec le feu (by Alain Robbe-Grillet) - Mathias
- 1975: Rosebud (by Otto Preminger) - Antoine Marachini
- 1975: Section spéciale (by Costa-Gavras) - André Obrecht, le premier adjoint de l'Exécuteur
- 1975: Il pleut sur Santiago (by Helvio Soto) - Général Lee
- 1975: Les Lolos de Lola (by Bernard Dubois) - Le chauffeur
- 1975: Attention les yeux ! (by Gérard Pirès) - Mercenary
- 1975: Police Python 357 (by Alain Corneau) - Le rouquin
- 1975: Le Voyage de noces (by Nadine Trintignant) - Nico
- 1976: Une femme fidèle (by Roger Vadim) - Samson
- 1978: Les Raisins de la Mort (by Jean Rollin) - Lucien
- 1978: Le Maître nageur (by Jean-Louis Trintignant, + producer) - Alfredo
- 1978: ville à prendre (by Patrick Brunie) - Dan Quichotte à Beaubourg
- 1979: The Big Red One (The Big Red One) (by Samuel Fuller) - Rensonnet
- 1980: Une femme au bout de la nuit (by Daniel Treda) - L'amant
- 1981: Quartet (Quartet) (by James Ivory) - Night Club Owner
- 1982: Boulevard des assassins (by Boramy Tioulong) - Raoul Taffa
- 1983: Les Îles (by Iradj Azimi) - Designy
- 1983: Premiers désirs (by David Hamilton) - Pierre-Albert
- 1984: Frankenstein 90 (by Alain Jessua) - Commissioner
- 1985: L'Été prochain (by Nadine Trintignant) - Le professeur à l'hôpital
- 1985: Adieu blaireau (by Bob Decout) - Le patron du 'Carré d'As'
- 1986: Chère canaille (by Stéphane Kurc, cut from final version) - Lino
- 1987: Grand guignol (by Jean Marboeuf) - Le client
- 1988: La Maison de Jade (by Nadine Trintignant) - L'empaillé
- 1989: Antonin (by Yves Caumon, short) - Nestor
- 1992: Krapatchouk (by Enrique Gabriel) - Philemon

Television

- 1967: Le Golem (by Jean Kerchbron)
- 1988: Anges et loups - Gondo
- 1998: Le Comte de Monte-Cristo (by Josée Dayan) - Pair St Gyon

Assistant director

- 1959: Les Liaisons dangereuses (by Roger Vadim)
- 1972: Une journée bien remplie (by Jean-Louis Trintignant)

Producer

- 1979: Le Soleil en face (by Pierre Kast)

== Theatre ==
- 1963 : Six Hommes en question by Frédéric Dard & Robert Hossein, directed by Robert Hossein, Théâtre Antoine
