= Alysson Paradis =

French actress (born 1984)

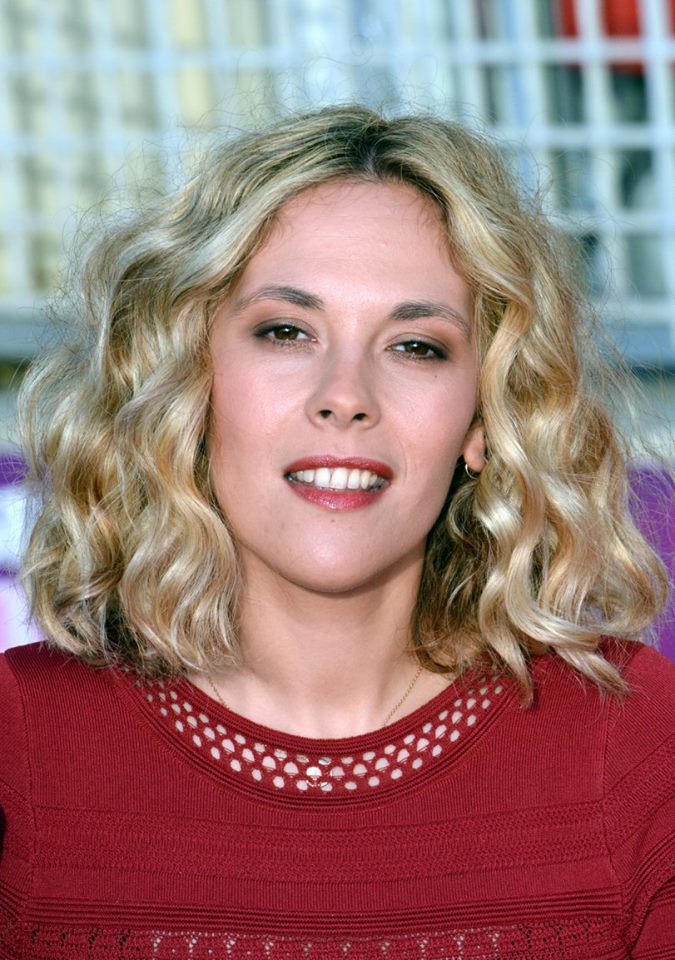
- Paradis in 2018
- Born: 29 May 1984 (age 42); Paris, France
- Occupation: Actress
- Years active: 2004–present
- Partner: Guillaume Gouix (2014–present)
- Children: 2
- Relatives: Vanessa Paradis (sister); Lily-Rose Depp (niece)
- Website: www.myspace.com/alyssonparadis

Alysson Paradis (born 29 May 1984) is a French actress. She is the younger sister of French singer and actress Vanessa Paradis and the aunt of model and actress Lily-Rose Depp.

== Early and personal life ==
Paradis was born on 29 May 1984 to interior designers André and Corinne Paradis in Paris, France. Since 2014, Paradis has been in a relationship with French actor Guillaume Gouix. In September 2015, the couple's first child, a son, was born. In August 2022, she gave birth to her second child with Gouix.

== Filmography ==
Year	Title	Role	Director	Notes
2004	The Last Day	Alice	Rodolphe Marconi	
2005	3 gouttes d'Antésite	Caroline	Karine Blanc, Michel Tavarès	Short
2005	Quand les anges s'en mêlent...	Judith	Crystel Amsalem	
2007	Inside	Sarah Scarangelo	Julien Maury and Alexandre Bustillo	Nominated – Fangoria Chainsaw Award for Best Actress
2007	Je suis femmosexuel... et toi?	The baker	Casas Olivier	Short
2007	Le grand patron	Véatrice Hatz	Dominique Ladoge	TV series (1 episode)
2008	Fracassés	Célia	Franck Llopis	
2009	The Childhood of Icarus	Alice Karr	Alex Iordachescu	
2009	L'île	Mona	Tibo Pinsard	Short
2010	Thelma, Louise et Chantal	Elisa	Benoît Pétré	
2010	Bittersweet Symphony	Romane	Jordi Avalos	Short
2010	Camping 2	Sandra	Fabien Onteniente	
2010	Le Greenboy and the Dirty Girl	Dirty Girl	Jérôme Genevray	Short
2010	Survivant(s)	Halia	Vincent Lecrocq	Short
2010	La segmentation des sentiments		Emilie & Sarah Barbault	Short
2010	L'essentiel féminin	The Intellectual	Sophie Guillemin	Short
2011	3eme B, 4eme gauche		Stéphanie Vasseur	Short
2011	Violence elle seule	Justine	Éric Capitaine	Short
2012	Riot on Redchurch Street	Astrid Angel Renaud	Trevor Miller	
2012	Deal	Marquise	Wilfried Méance	Short
2012	Q.I.	Karine Miguet / Candice Doll	Olivier De Plas	TV series
2012	Emprise		Vincent Arnaud	Short
2012	Les mouvements du bassin	The student self-defense	Hervé P. Gustave	
2013	Suzanne	Julie	Wilfried Méance (2)	Short
2013	Hasta mañana	The young lady	Sébastien Maggiani, Olivier Vidal	
2014	Les Yeux jaunes des crocodiles	Mylène	Cécile Telerman	
2015	Un jour de lucidité	Lucie	Emilie & Sarah Barbault (2)	Short; Nominated – World Music & Independent Film Festival – Best Actress in a Short
2015	Drama	Marie	Sophie Mathisen	
2017	Tensions sur le Cap Corse	Livia Santucci	Stéphanie Murat	TV movie
2017	J'pleure pas		Agathe Giraud & Noëlie Giraud	
2020	A Good Man	Annette	Marie-Castille Mention-Schaar	
2019-2022	War of the Worlds	Officer Clara	Richard Clark & Gilles Coulier	TV series

== See also ==
- List of French actors
