= Temptation (1959 film) =

Temptation Island
- Directed by: Edmond T. Gréville
- Written by: Henri Crouzat; Edmond T. Gréville; Louis A. Pascal
- Story by: Henri Crouzat
- Starring: Rossana Podestà
- Cinematography: Jacques Lemare
- Music by: Charles Aznavour; Eddie Barclay; Marguerite Monnot; Jean-Pierre Landreau
- Release date: 1959
- Language: French

Temptation (French: L'Île du bout du monde, also known as Temptation Island) is a 1959 French drama film co-written and directed by Edmond T. Gréville.

== Plot ==
Three young women and a man find themselves isolated on a desert island after a shipwreck.

== Cast ==
- Rossana Podestà as Caterina
- Dawn Addams as Victoria
- Magali Noël as Jane
- Christian Marquand as Patrick
