= Spotlight on a Murderer =

- Directed by: Georges Franju
- Written by: Marcel Fradetal
- Produced by: Jules Borkon
- Starring: Pierre Brasseur; Pascale Audret
- Cinematography: Marcel Fradetal
- Edited by: Gilbert Natot
- Music by: Maurice Jarre
- Distributed by: Metro-Goldwyn-Mayer
- Release date: 29 September 1961
- Running time: 95 minutes
- Country: France
- Language: French

Spotlight on a Murderer (French: Pleins feux sur l'assassin) is a 1961 French psychodrama/murder-mystery film directed by Georges Franju. It was released on Blu-ray and DVD by Arrow Films in August 2017 in the UK and USA regions in an open-matte 1.37:1 transfer by Gaumont of the film's original 1.66:1 aspect ratio.

== Cast ==
- Pierre Brasseur - Comte Hervé de Kerloguen
- Pascale Audret - Jeanne Benoist-Sainval
- Marianne Koch - Edwige
- Jean-Louis Trintignant - Jean-Marie de Kerloguen
- Dany Saval - Micheline
- Jean Babilée - Christian de Kerloguen
- Georges Rollin - Claude Benoist-Sainval
- Gérard Buhr - Henri
- Maryse Martin - Marthe
- Serge Marquand - Yvan
- Lucien Raimbourg - Julien
- Robert Vattier - Le notaire
