= Danièle Dubroux =

Danièle Dubroux (born September 4, 1947, Paris) is a French director, screenwriter, and actress.

== Filmography ==
=== As director ===
Short films

- 1978 : Les Deux Élèves préférés du professeur Francine Brouda
- 1982 : Sœur Anne ne vois-tu rien venir ?. Episode of collective film Die Erbtöchter

Feature-length films

- 1976 : L’Olivier, co-directed with le Groupe Cinéma Vincennes
- 1984 : Les Amants terribles, co-directed with Stavros Kaplanidis
- 1987 : La Petite Allumeuse
- 1992 : Border Line
- 1996 : Le Journal du séducteur
- 1998 : L'Examen de minuit
- 2004 : Éros thérapie

=== As screenwriter ===
- 1998 : … Comme elle respire (co-writer)
- 2000 : La Chambre obscure
- 2003 : Après vous

=== As actress ===
- 1978 : Les Deux Élèves préférés du professeur Francine Brouda
- 1980 : Cauchemar
- 1982 : Sœur Anne ne vois-tu rien venir?
- 1984 : Laisse béton
- 1984 : Les Amants terribles
- 1992 : Border Line
- 1996 : Le Journal du séducteur
- 1998 : L'Examen de minuit
- 1998 : L'École de la chair
