= Dead Man's Hand (2002 film) =

2002 film

- Directed by: Laurent Brandenburger; Philippe Boon
- Written by: Laurent Brandenburger; Philippe Boon
- Starring: Albert Dupontel; Marie Trintignant
- Release date: 6 February 2002
- Running time: 77 minutes
- Country: Luxembourg
- Language: French

Dead Man's Hand (French: Petites misères) is a 2002 Luxembourgish drama film directed by Laurent Brandenburger and Philippe Boon. It was selected as the Luxembourgish entry for the Best Foreign Language Film at the 75th Academy Awards, but it was not nominated.

== Cast ==
- Albert Dupontel as Jean
- Marie Trintignant as Nicole
- Serge Larivière as Georges
- Bouli Lanners as Eddy

== See also ==
- List of submissions to the 75th Academy Awards for Best Foreign Language Film
- List of Luxembourgish submissions for the Academy Award for Best Foreign Language Film
