= Marie Trintignant =

French actress (1962–2003)

- Born: 21 January 1962; Boulogne-Billancourt, France
- Died: 1 August 2003 (aged 41); Neuilly-sur-Seine, France
- Occupation: Actress
- Years active: 1967–2003
- Spouse: Samuel Benchetrit (m. 1998; sep. 2003)
- Children: 4
- Parents: Jean-Louis Trintignant; Nadine Marquand
- Relatives: Christian Marquand (uncle); Serge Marquand (uncle)

Marie Trintignant (French pronunciation: [maʁi tʁɛ̃tiɲɑ̃]; 21 January 1962 – 1 August 2003) was a French film and stage actress. She appeared in over 30 movies during her 36-year career. Her family was deeply involved in France's film industry, as her father was an actor and her mother a director, producer, and screenwriter.

In 2003, Trintignant began an affair with Bertrand Cantat, the lead singer of French rock band Noir Désir. That same year, Cantat, Trintignant, and her mother traveled to Lithuania so she and her mother could finish work on a television movie. On 26 July 2003, while in their shared hotel room, Cantat flew into a jealous rage during an argument over a text message sent to Trintignant by her husband, from whom she was separated; Cantat proceeded to beat her severely about the head and face. She died days later from cerebral edema brought about by her injuries. Cantat was convicted of "murder with indirect intent" in her death and received an eight-year prison sentence, of which he served four before his early release. Trintignant's case became a cause célèbre in the discussion of domestic violence and leniency towards perpetrators.

== Early life ==
Trintignant was born in Boulogne-Billancourt, the daughter of actor Jean-Louis Trintignant and his second wife, French film director, producer and screenwriter Nadine Marquand. When Marie's baby sister Pauline died when she was nine, she became withdrawn and virtually stopped speaking. Her parents divorced in 1976. Throughout her early life, she was afflicted by severe shyness, but by her mid-teens, she decided to commit to acting. She had a strong affection for animals and considered becoming a veterinarian, but in the end pursued a career in acting.

== Career ==
She first appeared on screen aged four in My Love, My Love, which was directed by her mother and starred her father. Trintignant's first film to generate significant critical acclaim was Série noire, in which she starred alongside Patrick Dewaere.

In 1988, Trintignant worked under French director Claude Chabrol in the film Une Affaire de Femmes, in which she played a young prostitute in wartime Vichy France. Of the role and Chabrol's impact on her career, Trintignant later reflected, "Until then, I had always felt that I was a fraud if I did not go to extremes in showing my characters' pain, but he taught me lightness. He showed me how to grow without false tragedy." She worked with Chabrol again in 1991 on the film Betty, an adaptation of a book by Georges Simenon.

In 1990, Trintignant was involved in a serious car accident which she narrowly survived. The accident hardly impacted the pace of her career, and she starred in 21 films afterwards, including Les Amants du Pont-Neuf in 1991 and Wild Target in 1993, starring alongside Jean Rochefort and Guillaume Depardieu. She starred opposite her then-husband François Cluzet in the 1995 film The Apprentices, and in 1998, she appeared again with Depardieu in White Lies. Two of Trintignant's films were released posthumously: Janis et John, a biographical film directed by her estranged husband Samuel Benchetrit, in which Trintignant starred as Janis Joplin, and Colette, une femme libre, a biographical miniseries in which Trintignant played the lead role of French novelist Colette.

Trintignant stated that she enjoyed portraying marginalized women and tragic heroes on film; she enjoyed playing characters who allowed her to speak "for those who don't deserve being spoken for." She performed in both comedies and tragedies.

== Personal life ==
Trintignant was the mother of four sons:

- Roman, with drummer Richard Kolinka
- Paul, with actor and former partner François Cluzet
- Léon, with Mathias Othnin-Girard
- Jules, with her husband director Samuel Benchetrit

Trintignant was still married to Benchetrit at the time of her death, although the two had separated earlier in 2003.

Two of Trintignant's sons, Roman Kolinka and Jules Benchetrit, are actors.

== Murder ==
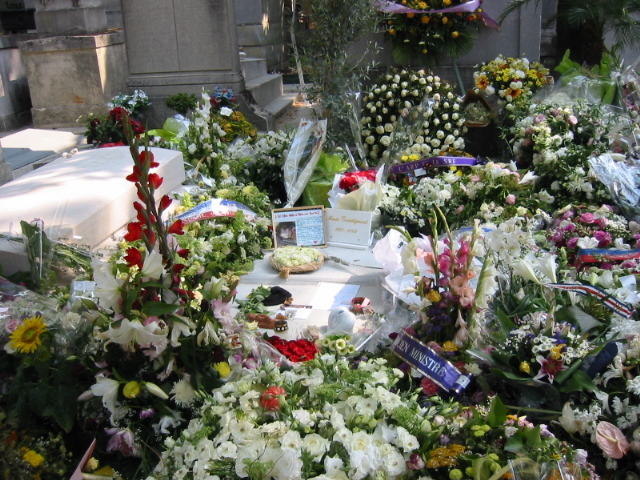
Marie Trintignant's grave

In 2003, Trintignant traveled to Vilnius, Lithuania, with her mother and her boyfriend, Bertrand Cantat, so she and her mother could finish work on Colette, une femme libre, a television movie in which she played the starring role. On 26 July, Trintignant was in a hotel room in Vilnius when, according to Cantat, she received a text from her ex husband. Cantat flew into a jealous rage, and he beat her severely. Seven hours later, Trintignant's brother summoned emergency services to check the hotel room. By the time they arrived, she had slipped into a deep coma. Next day, she was transported to a hospital in Vilnius; later, she was moved to the Hartmann Clinic, a hospital in Neuilly-sur-Seine, as her mother stated, "If she is to die, I want her to die in France." Trintignant died in Neuilly from swelling of the brain at the age of 41 on 1 August 2003.

=== Aftermath ===
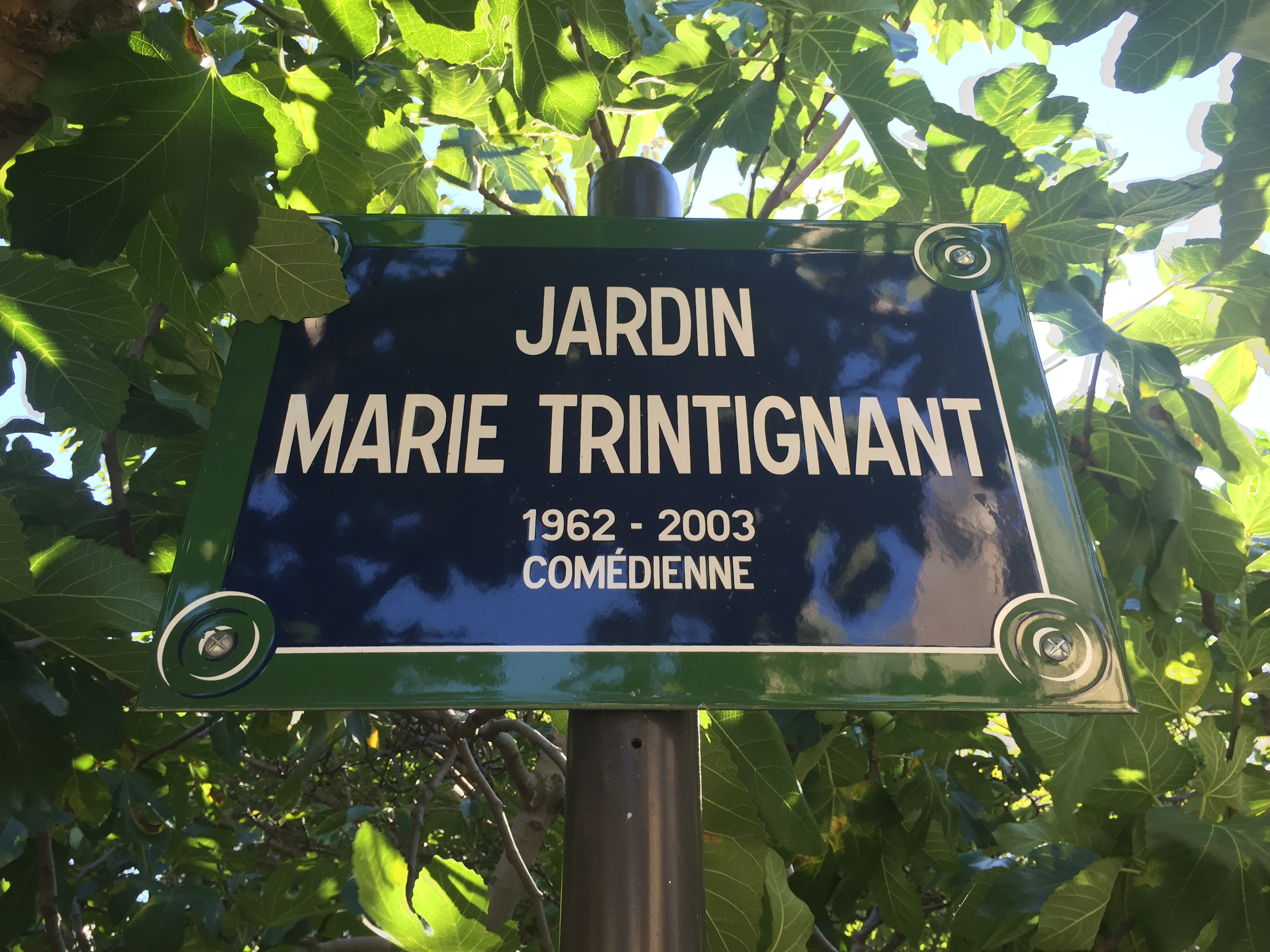
Commemorative plaque in Paris.

When authorities first arrived at the hotel room, Cantat told them and Trintignant's parents that she had fallen backwards during their argument and hit her head against a wall. An autopsy revealed that Cantat actually struck her in the head and face at least 19 times. After the autopsy countered Cantat's version, he would only admit to having "slapped" her four times and then putting her to bed while not knowing she had incurred severe and irreversible brain damage.

Although Cantat attempted to argue in court that he should be convicted of manslaughter, he was convicted of the slightly more severe "murder with indirect intent" and sentenced to eight years in prison. At the request of his lawyers, Cantat was moved from the Lithuanian Lukiškės prison, to a prison near Muret, France, in September 2004. He was released on parole after serving four years of his sentence. Cantat's parole drew widespread criticism from women's rights activists and Trintignant's parents, who had failed to persuade French President Nicolas Sarkozy and French judges to block Cantat's conditional release.

Several writers criticized the media for sensationalizing Trintignant's death and her relationship with Cantat, as, despite the elements of domestic violence in their relationship, rock journalists frequently compared them to Romeo and Juliet, as well as Sid Vicious and Nancy Spungen.

Trintignant's death resurfaced in the media years after Cantat's release when, in 2010, his ex-wife Krisztina Rády died by suicide. Cantat was present at Rády's house at the time of her death. Before her death, Rády had complained that Cantat subjected her to physical and mental abuse. Magistrates in Bordeaux conducted an investigation against him to adjudge if he should be charged for culpability in Rády's death, but ultimately, they decided against pressing charges.

Marie Trintignant has been the subject of several documentaries, including Enquete Exclusive – Affaire Bertrand Cantat (2019) and Marie Trintignant: Tes rêves brisés (2022). The former deals with her death and Cantat's subsequent trial; it also shows, for the first time on French television, images of Cantat's hearing before the Lithuanian court. The latter, which was directed by Trintignant's mother, recalls her life. In 2025 a Netflix documentary mini-series From Rockstar to Killer - The Cantat Case (2025) brought up new claims against Cantat from journalist Anne-Sophie Jahn.

== Awards ==
Trintignant was nominated for France's most prestigious acting honor, the César Award, five times, for her roles in:

- Comme elle respire - 1999 (best actress)
- Le Cousin - 1998 (best supporting actress)
- Le cri de la soie - 1997 (best actress)
- Les Marmottes - 1994 (best supporting actress)
- Une affaire de femmes - 1989 (best supporting actress)

== Partial filmography ==
- Mon Amour, Mon Amour (1967)
- It Only Happens to Others (1971)
- Défense de savoir (1973) - La petite fille Marie
- Le voyage de noces (1976) - La jeune fille au marriage
- Série noire (1979) - Mona
- La terrazza (1980) - Isabella
- Premier voyage (1980) - Marie Lambert
- Un matin rouge (1982) - Marie
- Les îles (1983) - Nathalie
- Next Summer (1985) - Sidonie
- Noyade interdite (1987) - Isabelle
- La maison de Jeanne (1988) - Martine
- Story of Women (1988) - Lulu / Lucie
- Wings of Fame (1990) - Bianca
- Nuit d'été en ville (1990) - Emilie / Woman
- Alberto Express (1990) - Clara
- Les Amants du Pont-Neuf (1991) - (voice)
- Contre l'oubli (1991) - Herself (segment "Pour José Ramón Garciá Gómez, Mexique")
- Betty (1992) - Betty Etamble
- L'instinct de l'ange (1993) - La jeune veuve
- Cible émouvante (1993) - Renée Dandrieux
- Les marmottes (1993) - Lucie
- Hoffman's honger (1993) - Irena Nova
- Fugueuses (1995) - Marina
- Les apprentis (1995) - Lorette
- Des nouvelles du bon Dieu (1996) - Evangile
- Le cri de la soie (1996) - Marie Benjamin
- Ponette (1996) - La mère
- Portraits chinois (1996) - Nina
- Les démons de Jésus (1997) - Levrette
- Le cousin (1997) - Juge Lambert
- White Lies (1998) - Jeanne
- Deep in the Woods (2000) - La mère
- Harrison's Flowers (2000) - Cathy
- Le prince du Pacifique (2000) - Moeata
- Una lunga lunga lunga notte d'amore (2001) - Irene
- Petites Misères (2002) - Nicole
- Total Kheops (2002) - Lole
- Corto Maltese, la cour secrète des arcanes (2002) - La Duchesse Marina Seminova (voice)
- Corto Maltese - Sous le signe du capricorne (2002) - Bouche Dorée
- Les Marins perdus (2003) - Mariette
- Janis et John (2003) - Brigitte Sterni
- Ce qu'ils imaginent (2004) - Juliette
- Colette, une femme libre (2004, TV mini-series, also writer) - Colette (final appearance)

== Appearances in other media ==
Not long before her death, she sang a duet in the song "Pièce montée des grands jours" by French folksinger Thomas Fersen in 2003.
