= The Apprentices =

1995 film by Pierre Salvadori

- Directed by: Pierre Salvadori
- Written by: Pierre Salvadori; Philippe Harel
- Produced by: Philippe Martin
- Starring: François Cluzet; Guillaume Depardieu
- Cinematography: Gilles Henry
- Edited by: Hélène Viard
- Music by: Philippe Eidel
- Distributed by: Les Films du Losange
- Release date: 20 December 1995
- Running time: 95 minutes
- Country: France
- Language: French

The Apprentices (French: Les Apprentis) is a 1995 French comedy film directed by Pierre Salvadori.

== Selected Cast ==
- François Cluzet - Antoine
- Guillaume Depardieu - Fred
- Marie Trintignant - Lorette
- Judith Henry - Sylvie
- Philippe Duquesne - Man in Flat 48
- Jean-Pol Brissart - Chief editor of Karaté Mag.
- Claude Aufaure - Fred's father
- Gérald Weingand - Laurent
- Thierry Balcon - Henri

== Plot ==
Antoine is a failed writer in his late thirties. Perpetually trying to complete his debut novel, he shares an apartment with Fred, a younger, unemployed and socially inept man who nevertheless seems content with his life. The story follows the pair in their chaotic attempts at generating income, as they try to survive in Paris despite their near-nonexistent resources. The adventures and, mostly, misadventures of these two buddies/losers make them realise that in spite of all their mishaps their friendship is the most important thing in their lives.
