= My Love, My Love (film) =

1967 film

- Directed by: Nadine Trintignant
- Written by: Nadine Trintignant
- Produced by: André Génovès
- Starring: Jean-Louis Trintignant
- Cinematography: Willy Kurant
- Edited by: Nicole Lubtchansky
- Release date: 1967
- Running time: 86 minutes
- Country: France
- Language: French

My Love, My Love (French: Mon amour, mon amour) is a 1967 French drama film directed by Nadine Trintignant. It was entered into the 1967 Cannes Film Festival.

== Cast ==
- Jean-Louis Trintignant - Vincent Falaise
- Valérie Lagrange - Agathe
- Annie Fargue - Jeanne
- Michel Piccoli - Marrades
- Katarina Larsson - Marilou
- Bernard Fresson - Serge
- Marie Trintignant
- Marie-José Nat - Cameo appearance (uncredited)
