= Christian Marquand =

French actor (1927–2000)

- Born: Christian Henri Marquand; 15 March 1927; Marseille, Bouches-du-Rhône, France
- Died: 22 November 2000 (aged 73); Ivry-sur-Seine, France
- Occupation: Actor
- Years active: 1946–1987
- Spouse: Tina Aumont (m. 1963; div. 1966)
- Children: 1
- Relatives: Serge Marquand (brother); Nadine Trintignant (sister); Marie Trintignant (niece)

Christian Henri Marquand (15 March 1927 – 22 November 2000) was a French actor.

== Early life ==
Marquand was born in Marseille, Bouches-du-Rhône, to a Spanish father and an Arab mother. He was the brother of actor Serge Marquand and filmmaker Nadine Trintignant.

== Career ==
Marquand's first film appearance was in 1946, as a footman in Jean Cocteau's Beauty and the Beast (La Belle et la Bête). After a few more small parts, he was prominently featured in Christian-Jaque's Lucrèce Borgia (1953) as one of Lucrezia's lovers, and as an Austrian soldier in Luchino Visconti's Senso (1954).

In 1956, he was directed by Roger Vadim in And God Created Woman (Et Dieu... créa la femme) opposite Brigitte Bardot. That film's success led to starring roles in the movies No Sun in Venice (1957), Temptation (1959), and The Big Show (1960) and leads opposite actresses Maria Schell, Jean Seberg, and Annie Girardot.

In 1962, Marquand appeared as French Naval Commando leader Philippe Kieffer in Darryl F. Zanuck's World War II movie The Longest Day, which led to further roles in international productions such as Behold a Pale Horse (1964), Lord Jim (1965) and The Flight of the Phoenix (1965).

He appeared in feature films and television throughout the 1970s, and played a French plantation owner in Francis Ford Coppola's re-edited Vietnam war epic Apocalypse Now Redux (1979/2001). He never saw his work from the movie on screen, as Apocalypse Now Redux was released in May, 2001, six months after his death. His last performance was in a 1987 French TV mini-series. He directed two films, Les Grands Chemins (1963) and the all-star sex farce Candy (1968).

== Personal life ==
In 1956, Marquand allegedly had an affair with Nina Dyer. Marquand was married to actress Tina Aumont from 1963 to 1966. He had a son, Yann (born 1972), from a relationship with actress Dominique Sanda.

Marquand was a close friend of actor Marlon Brando, who named his son after him, as did director Roger Vadim.

== Death ==
Marquand was diagnosed with Alzheimer's disease in 1985, retiring from acting two years later. He died from complications of the illness on 22 November 2000.

== Selected filmography ==
- Beauty and the Beast (1946) - Footman (uncredited)
- Quai des Orfèvres (1947) - Bit Part (uncredited)
- Dirty Hands (1951) - Dimitri
- La demoiselle et son revenant (1952) - Le zouave
- Lucrèce Borgia (1953) - Paolo
- Senso (1954) - Un ufficiale boemo
- Attila (1954) - Hun Leader
- Human Torpedoes (1954) - Paolo
- Men in White (1955) - Philippon
- Impasse des vertus (1955) - Eugène Legrand
- More Whiskey for Callaghan (1955) - (uncredited)
- L'Amant de lady Chatterley (1955) - L'amant de Bertha
- And God Created Woman (1956) - Antoine Tardieu
- No Sun in Venice (1957) - Michel Lafaurie
- Le désir mène les hommes (1958) - Philippe Vincent
- One Life (1958) - Julien de Lamare
- Temptation (1959) - Patrick
- Llegaron dos hombres (1959) - Pablo Morales
- I Spit on Your Grave (1959) - Joe Grant
- Sergeant X (1960) - Michel Rousseau
- Tendre et Violente Élisabeth (1960) - Claude Walter
- The Big Show (1960) - Walter
- Sweet Deceptions (1960) - Enrico
- Final Accord (1960) - Frank Leroux
- Love Play (1961) - Philippe
- La Proie pour l'ombre (1961) - Bruno
- Les Parisiennes (1962) - Christian Lénier (segment "Antonia")
- Le crime ne paie pas (1962) - Louis Aubert (segment "L'affaire Fenayrou")
- Un chien dans un jeu de quilles (1962) - Rodolphe
- The Longest Day (1962) - Capitaine de Corvette Philippe Kieffer - Commando Leader
- Les saintes-nitouches (1963) - Steve
- La bonne soupe (1964) - Lucien Volard
- Behold a Pale Horse (1964) - Zaganar
- Lord Jim (1965) - the French Officer
- The Flight of the Phoenix (1965) - Dr. Renaud
- The Peking Medallion (1967) - Brandon
- Who's Got the Black Box? (1967) - Robert Ford
- Candy (1968) - Film director
- Ciao Manhattan (1972) - Entrepreneur
- Heiß und kalt (1972)
- Victory at Entebbe (1976, TV Movie) - Captain Dukas
- The Other Side of Midnight (1977) - Armand Gautier
- Les Apprentis Sorciers (1977) - Ashe / Bezzerides
- Evening in Byzantium (1978) - Inspector DuBois
- Beggarman, Thief (1979) - Inspector Charboneau
- Le Maître-nageur (1979) - Paul Jouriace
- Cause toujours... tu m'intéresses ! (1979) - Georges Julienne
- Apocalypse Now Redux (1979) - Hubert de Marais
- Brigade mondaine: La secte de Marrakech (1979) - Père Peter
- Je vous aime (1980) - Victor
- Choice of Arms (1981) - Jean
- Chassé-croisé (1982)
- Emmanuelle 4 (1984) - Docteur Santano
- Next Summer (1985) - Vierre
- Adieu Blaireau (1985) - Victor
