= No Sun in Venice =

1957 film

- Film poster
- Directed by: Roger Vadim
- Written by: Roger Vadim; Pero Budak
- Produced by: Raoul Lévy
- Starring: Françoise Arnoul; Christian Marquand; Robert Hossein
- Cinematography: Armand Thirard
- Edited by: Victoria Mercanton
- Music by: John Lewis
- Production companies: Carol Film; Iéna Productions; Union Cinématographique Lyonnaise
- Distributed by: Cinédis
- Release date: 31 May 1957
- Running time: 96 minutes
- Countries: France; Italy
- Language: French
- Box office: 1,510,505 admissions (France)

No Sun in Venice (French: Sait-on jamais...) is a 1957 French-Italian drama film directed by Roger Vadim and starring Françoise Arnoul, Christian Marquand and Robert Hossein. It was entered into the 7th Berlin International Film Festival. The soundtrack for the film was composed by pianist John Lewis, and performed by the Modern Jazz Quartet. The soundtrack album was released in 1957 on Atlantic. It was shot at the Billancourt Studios in Paris and on location in Venice. The film's sets were designed by the art director Jean André.

== Cast ==
- Françoise Arnoul as Sophie
- Christian Marquand as Michel Lafaurie
- Robert Hossein as Sforzi
- O. E. Hasse as Eric von Bergen
- Franco Fabrizi as Busetti
- Franco Andrei as Bernard
- Carlo Delle Piane as Jeannot
- Mario Passante as Inspecteur
- Lila Rocco as Lisa
- Margaret Rung as Comtesse
- Christian Cazau as Coco
- Venantino Venantini
- Daniel Emilfork

== Production ==
The film was made by Roger Vadim and producer Raoul Levy, who had just made And God Created Woman which was yet to be released. It was based on an unpublished novel Vadim had written a few years before. Levy had it relocated from Paris to Italy and cast Francoise Arnoul as he did not want to risk casting Brigitte Bardot in case And God Created Woman was not a success.
