= La Duchesse de Langeais =

1834 novel by Honoré de Balzac

La Duchesse de LangeaisThe Duchess of Langeais
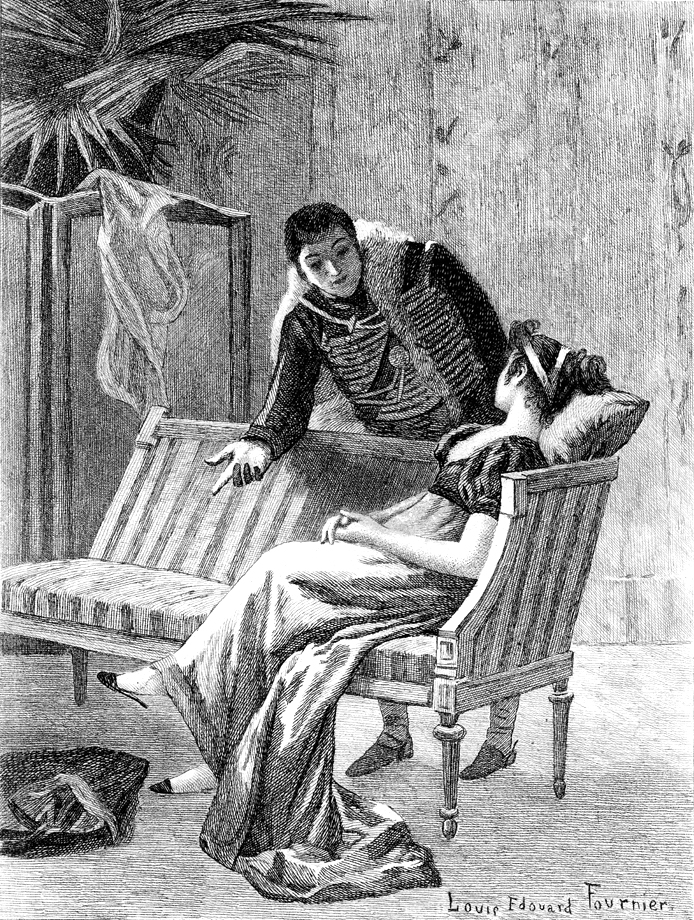
- Title page of La Duchesse de Langeais (1833)
- Author: Honoré de Balzac
- Original title: La Duchesse de Langeais
- Language: French
- Series: La Comédie humaine
- Publication date: 1834
- Publication place: Paris, France

The Duchess of Langeais (French: La Duchesse de Langeais) is an 1834 novel by French author Honoré de Balzac (1799–1850) and included in the Scènes de la vie parisienne ('Scenes from Parisian life') section of his novel sequence La Comédie humaine. It first appeared in 1834 under the title Ne touchez pas la hache ('Don't Touch the Axe') in the periodical L'Écho de la Jeune France. It is part of Balzac's 1839 trilogy Histoire des treize: Ferragus is the first part, the second is The Duchess of Langeais, and part three is The Girl with the Golden Eyes.

== Plot ==
General Armand de Montriveau, a war hero, is enamoured of Duchess Antoinette de Langeais, a coquettish, married noblewoman who invites him to a ball but ultimately refuses his sexual advances and then disappears. Assisted by the powerful group known as The Thirteen, who subscribe to an occult form of freemasonry, General Montriveau finds the duchess in a Spanish monastery of Discalced Carmelites under the name of Sister Theresa.

Dedicated to Franz Liszt, this portrait of a vain representative of the noble families of Faubourg Saint-Germain, was inspired by the Laure Junot with whom Balzac had a failed romance.

== Film adaptations ==
- La Duchesse de Langeais, 1910 French film by André Calmettes
- The Eternal Flame, 1922 US film by Frank Lloyd
- Love, 1927 German film by Paul Czinner
- La Duchesse de Langeais, 1942 French film by Jacques de Baroncelli
- La Duchesse de Langeais, 1982 French television film by Jean-Paul Roux
- La Duchesse de Langeais, 1995 French television film by Jean-Daniel Verhaeghe
- The Duchess of Langeais, 2007 French film by Jacques Rivette
