= It's Raining on Santiago =

- Directed by: Helvio Soto
- Written by: Helvio Soto; Georges Conchon
- Produced by: Jacques Charrier
- Starring: Annie Girardot; Jean-Louis Trintignant; Bibi Andersson
- Cinematography: Georges Barsky
- Edited by: Cécile Decugis; Eva Zora
- Music by: Astor Piazzolla
- Release date: 10 December 1975
- Running time: 112 min.
- Countries: France; Bulgaria
- Language: French

It's Raining on Santiago (French: Il pleut sur Santiago) is a 1975 French-Bulgarian drama film directed by Helvio Soto, detailing the 1973 Chilean coup d'etat. The title is a code word the Chilean military had broadcast to signal the start of the coup.

== Cast ==
- Annie Girardot as Maria Olivares
- Jean-Louis Trintignant as Le sénateur
- Bibi Andersson as Monique Calvé
- Naicho Petrov as Salvador Allende
- Henri Poirier as Augusto Pinochet
- Bernard Fresson as Un ministre
- Nicole Calfan as La fille d'Allende
- Laurent Terzieff as Calvé
- André Dussollier as Hugo
- John Abbey as CIA Agent
- Riccardo Cucciolla as Olivares
- Vera Dikova as La femme de Jorge
- Maurice Garrel as Jorge
- Patricia Guzmán as L'étudiante
- Serge Marquand as Général Leigh
