= Playing with Fire (1975 film) =

- Directed by: Alain Robbe-Grillet
- Written by: Alain Robbe-Grillet
- Starring: Jean-Louis Trintignant; Philippe Noiret
- Cinematography: Yves Lafaye
- Edited by: Bob Wade
- Release date: 1975
- Running time: 112 minutes
- Countries: France; Italy
- Language: French

Playing with Fire (French: Le Jeu avec le feu, Italian: Giochi di fuoco) is a 1975 French-Italian comedy-drama film written and directed by Alain Robbe-Grillet and starring Jean-Louis Trintignant.

It was released in France in 1975 and recorded admissions of 350,606.

== Plot ==
Georges de Saxe, a banker, is warned by an anonymous phone call that his daughter Caroline has been kidnapped. The kidnappers demand a ransom of one million dollars. But soon after, Caroline comes home. Her father nevertheless decides to protect his daughter: his advisers suggest that he shelter her in a specialized clinic... .

== Cast ==
- Jean-Louis Trintignant – the handsome man / the henchman
- Philippe Noiret – the banker
- Anicée Alvina – Carolina, the banker's daughter
- Philippe Ogouz – a henchman
- Agostina Belli – the maid
- Sylvia Kristel – a kidnapped woman
- Christine Boisson – the first kidnapped girl
- Vernon Dobtcheff – a messenger
- Serge Marquand – the valet
- Jacques Seiler – the taxi driver
- Jacques Doniol-Valcroze – the police commissioner

== Production ==
Luc Béraud is assistant director on the movie.
