= White Lies (1998 French film) =

- Film poster
- Directed by: Pierre Salvadori
- Written by: Danièle Dubroux; Pierre Salvadori; Marc Syrigas
- Produced by: Philippe Martin; Gérard Louvin (co-producer)
- Starring: Marie Trintignant
- Cinematography: Gilles Henry
- Edited by: Hélène Viard
- Music by: Camille Bazbaz
- Production companies: Canal+ France 2 Cinéma; Glem Production
- Distributed by: Les Films du Losange
- Release dates: 8 April 1998 (France); 29 April 1998 (Belgium)
- Running time: 106 minutes
- Country: France
- Language: French
- Budget: $4.4 million
- Box office: $1.1 million

White Lies (original title: ...Comme elle respire (La Menteuse est amoureuse)) is a 1998 French comedy film directed by Pierre Salvadori, and written by Danièle Dubroux, Pierre Salvadori, and Marc Syrigas. starring Marie Trintignant, Guillaume Depardieu, Jean-François Stévenin.

== Synopsis ==
Is mythomania an evil trait, or a sickness? Jeanne, played by Marie Trintignant, can never tell the truth for more than two minutes. She fears that reality is too much for her. And Guillaume Depardieu, who plays the role of her lover, discovers her mythomania, but stays in love with her.

== Cast ==
- Marie Trintignant as Jeanne
- Guillaume Depardieu as Antoine
- Jean-François Stévenin as Marcel
- Serge Riaboukine as Barnabé
- Blanchette Brunoy as Madeleine
- Michèle Moretti as Jeanne's mother
- Bernard Verley as Jeanne's father
- Marc Susini as François
- Blandine Pélissier as Hélène
- Gwenaëlle Simon as Isabelle
- Jacques Dacqmine as Lawyer Maillard

== Accolades ==
Award / Film Festival	Category	Recipients and nominees	Result
César Awards	Best Actress	Marie Trintignant	Nominated
