= Je vous aime =

Je Vous Aime
- Directed by: Claude Berri
- Produced by: Renn Productions
- Starring: Catherine Deneuve; Jean-Louis Trintignant; Gérard Depardieu; Serge Gainsbourg; Alain Souchon
- Cinematography: Étienne Becker
- Music by: Serge Gainsbourg
- Distributed by: Agence Méditerranéenne de Location de Films (A.M.L.F.)
- Release date: 1980
- Running time: 100 minutes
- Country: France
- Language: French
- Box office: $8,100,210

Je Vous Aime (English: I Love You All) is a 1980 French romance film directed by Claude Berri. Its cast comprises notable actors and actresses like Jean Louis Trintignant, Catherine Deneuve, Gérard Depardieu and Serge Gainsbourg. It was first released in 1980 and it was shown in the US in 1981.

== Plot ==
Alice is a journalist in her late thirties, and the divorced mother of a teenage boy. While professionally successful, she struggles to find a suitable life partner.

As she and Claude are about to break up, she reminisces about several of her past relationships: Simon, an older, irascible singer who involves her in his artistic endeavors and with whom she constantly fights; Patrick, a singer and musician who wins her heart with his doe-eyed glance while accompanying one of Simon's songs on the saxophone ; Julien, a timid, middle-aged gentleman who falls for Alice while helping her push her stalled car to a roadside during a thunderstorm. The film follows a non-linear narrative as it recounts Alice's romances with those men and how their relationships ultimately failed.

== Cast ==
- Catherine Deneuve as Alice
- Jean-Louis Trintignant as Julien
- Gérard Depardieu as Patrick
- Serge Gainsbourg as Simon
- Alain Souchon as Claude
- Dominique Besnehard as Dominique
- Christian Marquand : Victor, Anne's ex-husband
- Igor Schlumberger : Jérôme
- Thomas Langmann : Loïc, Claude's son
- Isabelle Lacamp : Dorothée
- Dominique Besnehard : Hubert
- Marcel Romano : Francis
- Vanessa Guiomard : Jeanne

== Soundtrack ==
Serge Gainsbourg wrote the music score for the movie, notably the song Dieu fumeur de havanes, which he duets with Deneuve in one scene. The song was released as a successful single. Another tune from the soundtrack, a punk rock song titled La P'tite Agathe and performed by Gérard Depardieu, was also released as a single.

== Awards ==
Organization	Category	Recipients and nominees	Result
César Award	César Award for Best Supporting Actor	Alain Souchon	Nominated
César Award	César Award for Best Music Written for a Film	Serge Gainsbourg	Nominated
