= La terrazza =

- French theatrical release poster
- Directed by: Ettore Scola
- Written by: Ettore Scola; Agenore Incrocci; Furio Scarpelli
- Produced by: Pio Angeletti; Adriano De Micheli
- Starring: Ugo Tognazzi; Vittorio Gassman; Jean-Louis Trintignant; Marcello Mastroianni; Stefania Sandrelli; Carla Gravina; Ombretta Colli; Stefano Satta Flores; Serge Reggiani
- Cinematography: Pasqualino De Santis
- Edited by: Raimondo Crociani
- Music by: Armando Trovajoli
- Production companies: Dean Film; Marceau-Cocinor
- Distributed by: United Artists Europa (Italy); Gaumont Distribution (France)
- Release dates: 8 February 1980 (Italy); 26 September 1980 (France)
- Running time: 155 minutes
- Countries: Italy; France
- Language: Italian

La terrazza is a 1980 Italian-French drama film directed by Ettore Scola. The all-star cast features the best of Italian Cinema of its era: Marcello Mastroianni, Ugo Tognazzi, Vittorio Gassman, Jean-Louis Trintignant, Serge Reggiani, Stefano Satta Flores, Stefania Sandrelli, Carla Gravina, Ombretta Colli, Milena Vukotic.

The film director Ettore Scola and the screenwriter Agenore Incrocci make cameo appearances.

== Plot ==
On a terrace in Rome, some old friends and colleagues, guests of a living room couple, periodically meet. The film focuses on the days following one of these encounters and recounts this time span in five different episodes from five different points of view.

The first episode tells of Enrico, an uninspired screenwriter who ends up in the throes of a very heavy nervous breakdown; the second episode tells of Luigi, an out-of-fashion, pleasure-seeking, womanizing journalist who tries to win back his wife, a politically engaged journalist who is twenty years his junior, and actively pursuing feminist causes; the third episode tells of Sergio, an anorexic and clinically depressed RAI official; the fourth episode tells of Amedeo, a successful film producer struggling with the artistic ambitions of his wife, who in fact endorses the career of a haughty director of scabrous arthouse films, and with which he no longer has any relationship despite his efforts to rekindle; the last episode tells of Mario, a deputy of the Italian Communist Party, facing a strong existential crisis who finds himself cultivating an adulterous relationship.

At the end of these five stories, the film closes with a new meeting on that same terrace, which takes place a year later.

== Cast ==
- Marcello Mastroianni - Luigi
- Vittorio Gassman - Mario
- Ugo Tognazzi - Amedeo
- Jean-Louis Trintignant - Enrico
- Stefania Sandrelli - Giovanna
- Serge Reggiani - Sergio
- Carla Gravina - Carla
- Stefano Satta Flores - Tizzo
- Marie Trintignant - Isabella
- Ombretta Colli - Enza
- Galeazzo Benti - Galeazzo
- Milena Vukotic - Emanuela
- Agenore Incrocci - Vittorio
- Leonardo Benvenuti - A guest
- Ugo Gregoretti - Another guest
- Lucio Lombardo Radice - Himself

== Awards ==
- 2 awards at the 1980 Cannes Film Festival: Best Screenplay, Best Supporting Actress (Carla Gravina)
- 2 Nastro d'Argento awards: Best Screenplay, Best Supporting Actress (Stefania Sandrelli)
