= Les Pas perdus =

- Directed by: Jacques Robin
- Written by: René Fallet (novel, dialogue & screenplay); Jacques Robin
- Starring: Michèle Morgan; Jean-Louis Trintignant
- Cinematography: Claude Lecomte
- Edited by: Nadine Trintignant
- Music by: Jacques Loussier
- Production company: Cinerora
- Distributed by: Setec
- Release date: 27 May 1964
- Running time: 98 min
- Country: France
- Language: French

Les Pas perdus (English title: The Last Steps) is a 1964 French drama film directed by Jacques Robin who co-wrote the screenplay with René Fallet, based on the latter's eponymous novel. The film stars Michèle Morgan and Jean-Louis Trintignant.

It tells the story of a rich attractive married woman who become involved in a love affair with a young worker she has met in the station.

== Principal cast ==
- Michèle Morgan - Yolande Simonnet
- Jean-Louis Trintignant - Georges Guichard
- Jean Carmet - Déde Lemartin
- Michel Vitold - Pierre Simonnet
- Catherine Rouvel - Sonia, dite Mazurka
