= The Hook (1963 film) =

1963 film by George Seaton

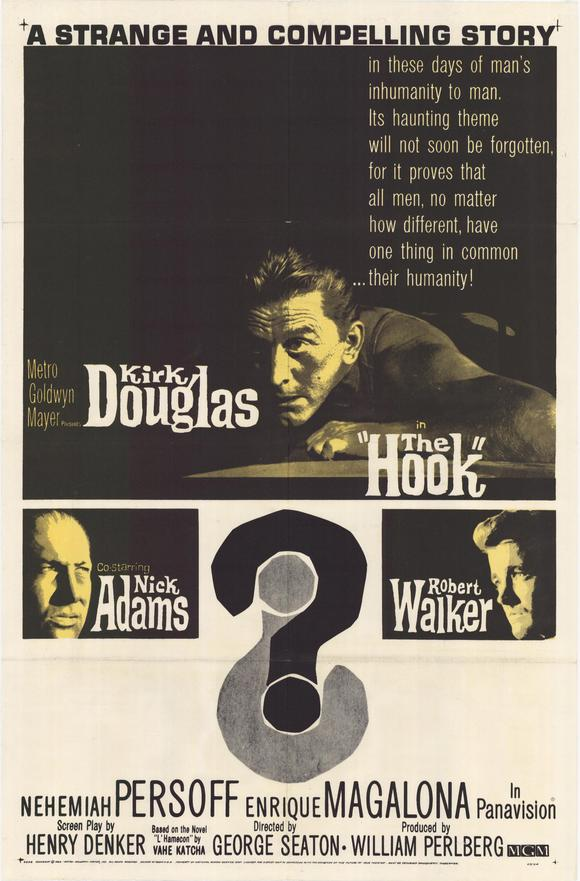
- Theatrical release poster with artwork by Reynold Brown
- Directed by: George Seaton
- Written by: Henry Denker
- Based on: L'Hameçon (novel, 1957) by Vahé Katcha
- Produced by: William Perlberg
- Starring: Kirk Douglas; Nick Adams; Robert Walker Jr. Nehemiah Persoff
- Cinematography: Joseph Ruttenberg
- Edited by: Robert James Kern
- Music by: Larry Adler
- Distributed by: Metro-Goldwyn-Mayer
- Release dates: January 16, 1963 (Washington, D.C.)
- Running time: 98 minutes
- Country: United States
- Language: English

The Hook is a 1963 Korean War war film directed by George Seaton based on the 1957 novel L'Hameçon by Vahé Katcha. The film's title comes from the translation of the title of the original novel rather than the Battle of the Hook. The film was shot off Santa Catalina Island, California.

== Plot ==
During the Korean War in 1953, a group of Eighth U.S. Army soldiers aboard a merchant ship capture the enemy Korean People's Army Air Force pilot of a plane they have shot down. They are ordered by the Republic of Korea Army headquarters to execute the prisoner, but none of the soldiers are able to will themselves to go through with the command. Just as Sgt. Briscoe is about to report his failure to carry out the order, word arrives that an armistice has been signed. The prisoner, uncomprehending, escapes and is found by Briscoe attempting to ignite gasoline to blow up the ship. Just before Briscoe kills the prisoner with a wrench, the man utters a single word that Briscoe later learns to mean "I can't."

== Cast ==
- Kirk Douglas as Sergeant P.J. Briscoe
- Nick Adams as Private V.R. Hackett
- Robert Walker as Private O.A. Dennison
- Enrique G. Magalona, Jr. as The Prisoner
- Nehemiah Persoff as Captain Van Ryn
- William Challee as Schmidt
- Mark Miller as Lieutenant D.D. Troy

== Critical reception ==
Bosley Crowther of The New York Times found the whole premise of the film dubious, considering it to be "of such doubtful occurrence and so little urgency ... that one finds it hard to get involved." He concluded that "the whole thing has the nature of a contrived hypothesis, for which the solution is so ready that the arrival at it is tedious." Variety called the film "ideally suited to the cinematic tastes of war action buffs but disappointing for the discerning customer." Philip K. Scheuer of the Los Angeles Times wrote, "The GIs—Douglas, Walker, Adams and briefly, Mark Miller—differentiate their characters fairly well within the confines of the script, though they remain essentially stereotypes." Richard L. Coe of The Washington Post wrote that Henry Denker's screenplay "begins on a tense, dramatic note and manages to keep the pitch for the story's 94 minutes," adding, "I was especially impressed with the mute performance of the Philippine actor, Enrique Magalona, as the prisoner. This is a memorable, creative portrait." The Monthly Film Bulletin found the script "technically excellent," but thought it was the "smug, unimpassioned way" in which the ethical theme was "grafted onto the stock story of another of Hollywood's neurotic bullies that faults the whole film."
