= The Duchess of Langeais (2007 film) =

2007 French-Italian period drama film

- Film poster
- Directed by: Jacques Rivette
- Screenplay by: Pascal Bonitzer; Christine Laurent; Jacques Rivette
- Based on: La Duchesse de Langeais by Honoré de Balzac
- Produced by: Roberto Cicutto; Martine Marignac; Luigi Musini; Ermanno Olmi; Maurice Tinchant
- Starring: Jeanne Balibar; Guillaume Depardieu
- Cinematography: William Lubtchansky
- Edited by: Nicole Lubtchansky
- Music by: Pierre Allio
- Production companies: Pierre Grise Productions; Cinemaundici; Arte France Cinéma
- Distributed by: Les Films du Losange
- Release dates: 15 February 2007 (Berlinale); 28 March 2007 (France)
- Running time: 137 minutes
- Countries: France; Italy
- Language: French
- Budget: €3.9 million
- Box office: $616,441

The Duchess of Langeais is a 2007 French-Italian period drama film directed by Jacques Rivette. Its original French title is Ne touchez pas la hache ("Don't touch the axe"). It is based on the 1834 novel of the same name by Honoré de Balzac. The film stars Jeanne Balibar and Guillaume Depardieu as lovers in the 1820s, who are involved in a tormented and frustrating relationship.

== Plot ==
Armand de Montriveau, a general under Napoleon but of no account under the Restoration régime, has traced Antoinette de Langeais, the woman he loves, to a convent in Majorca where she has hidden herself as a nun. He asks for an interview, which is granted when Antoinette claims he is her brother. When they meet, she shrieks that he is her lover and he is hustled out.

The scene shifts back to their first meeting at a party in Paris, where she is entranced by his tales of exploits in Egypt. She encourages him to visit the town house where she lives alone, her husband being elsewhere. She even receives him in her nightdress, claiming to be ill. For she is a born coquette, delighting in her power over Armand yet always denying any bodily intimacy. As well as reminding him she is married, she also plays the religion card by reminding him that adultery would be a sin. In time he starts playing her game in return, becoming capricious and moody. With masked friends, he even abducts her and threatens to torture her, but when she seems about to give in he lets her go. He stops answering her letters, and even stops opening them. In despair, she gives him an ultimatum: to meet her or never see her again. He does not keep the rendezvous and she disappears from Paris.

The scene shifts forward to Armand and his friends who, after the rebuff in the convent, decide to storm the place in the middle of the night and abduct Antoinette. Reaching her room, they find her laid out dead.

== Cast ==
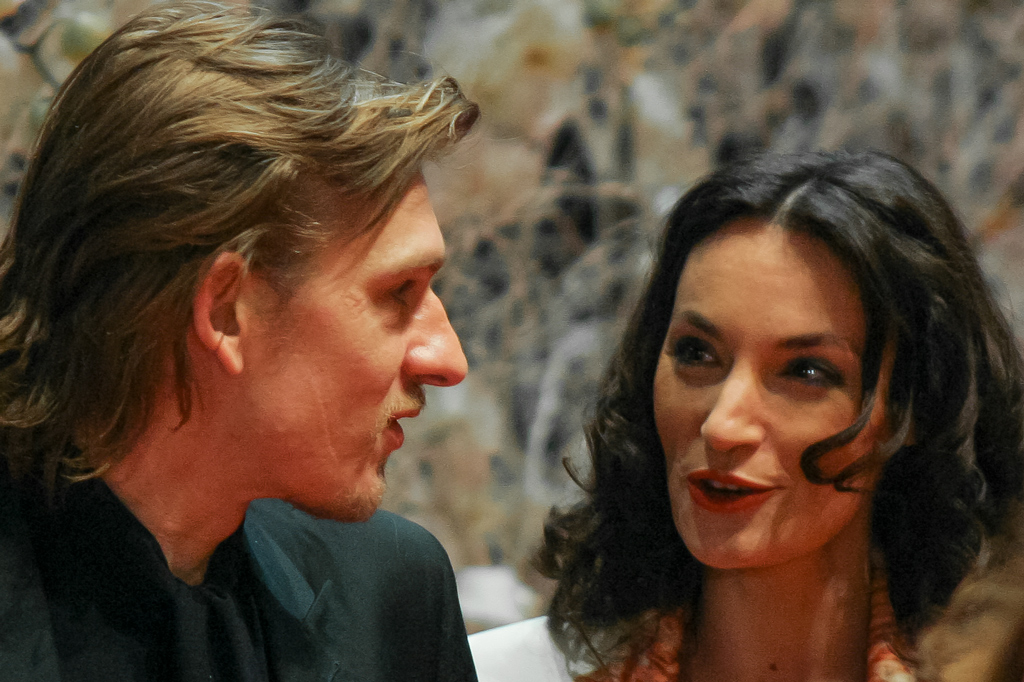
Guillaume Depardieu and Jeanne Balibar during the film's opening night at the Berlinale 2007.

- Jeanne Balibar as Antoinette de Langeais
- Guillaume Depardieu as Armand de Montriveau
- Michel Piccoli as Vidame de Pamiers
- Bulle Ogier as Princesse de Blamont-Chauvry
- Anne Cantineau as Clara de Sérizy
- Marc Barbé as Marquis de Ronquerolles
- Thomas Durand as Henri de Marsay
- Mathias Jung as Julien
- Julie Judd as Lisette
- Nicolas Bouchaud as Maxime de Trailles
- Beppe Chierici as Alcalde
- Victoria Zinny as Mother Superior
- Barbet Schroeder as The Duke of Grandlieu

== Reception ==
Review aggregation website Rotten Tomatoes reported an approval rating of 70%, based on 66 reviews, with an average score of 6.5/10. The site's critical consensus reads, "At times plodding and dialogue heavy, The Duchess of Langeais is nevertheless an intriguing and rewarding dissection of class and gender relations." At Metacritic, which assigns a normalized rating out of 100 to reviews from mainstream critics, the film received an average score of 74, based on 23 reviews, indicating "generally favorable reviews".

=== Accolades ===
| Award / Film Festival | Category | Recipients and nominees | Result |
|---|---|---|---|
| Berlin Film Festival | Golden Bear | | Nominated |
| Gaudí Awards | Best European Film | | Nominated |
| Lumière Awards | Best Actor | Guillaume Depardieu | Nominated |
