= The Childhood of Icarus =

- Directed by: Alex Iordăchescu
- Written by: Alex Iordăchescu; Marianne Brun; Marcel Beaulieu
- Produced by: Ruxandra Zenide; Daniel Burlac; Alex Iordăchescu
- Starring: Guillaume Depardieu; Alysson Paradis; Carlo Brandt; Sophie Lukasik; Dorotheea Petre
- Cinematography: Marius Panduru
- Music by: The Young Gods
- Release date: 2009
- Running time: 98 minutes
- Countries: France, Switzerland, Romania
- Language: French

The Childhood of Icarus (original French title: L'Enfance d'Icare) is a 2009 film co-written, co-produced, and directed by the Romanian-born Swiss director Alex Iordăchescu.

The film stars an ensemble cast that includes notable actors from France, Switzerland, and Romania: Guillaume Depardieu, Alysson Paradis, Carlo Brandt, Sophie Lukasik, Dorotheea Petre, Patricia Bopp, Jean-Pierre Gos, and Mădălina Constantin. It was released more than two years after the death of the leading actor, Depardieu, from an infection acquired while making this movie.

== Plot ==
Following an accident, Jonathan Vogel (played by Guillaume Depardieu) loses a leg. Professor Karr (played by Carlo Brandt) offers a revolutionary treatment that will change his life. But this crazy dream turns into a nightmare, and Vogel becomes the victim of a terrible medical mistake.
