= Guillaume Depardieu =

French actor (1971–2008)

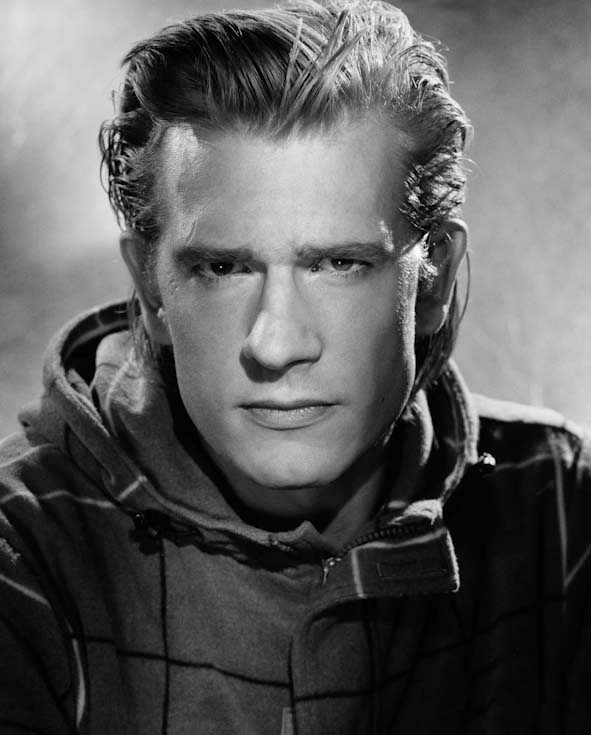
- Depardieu in 2005
- Born: Guillaume Jean Maxime Antoine Depardieu; 7 April 1971; Paris, France
- Died: 13 October 2008 (aged 37); Garches, France
- Occupation: Actor
- Years active: 1974–2008
- Spouse: Elise Ventre (m. 1999; div. 2001)
- Children: 1
- Parent(s): Gérard Depardieu; Élisabeth Depardieu
- Relatives: Julie Depardieu (sister); Alain Depardieu (uncle); Delphine Depardieu (cousin)
- Awards: Most Promising Actor; 1995 Les apprentis

Guillaume Jean Maxime Antoine Depardieu (French: [ɡijom dəpaʁdjø]; 7 April 1971 – 13 October 2008) was a French actor. The oldest child of Gérard Depardieu, Guillaume followed in his father's footsteps by starting an acting career in the early 1990s. He eventually achieved success, earning the César Award for Most Promising Actor for his role in the 1995 comedy The Apprentices. However, his career was disrupted by drug use, and later by health problems that culminated in the amputation of one of his legs in 2003. Depardieu died of pneumonia at the age of 37.

== Early life ==
Depardieu was the son of actor Gérard Depardieu and his wife, actress Élisabeth Depardieu (née Guignot). He was the older brother of actress Julie Depardieu. His two half-siblings, Roxane and Jean, were born when he was an adult.

== Career ==
Guillaume shared the screen with his father several times throughout his career, beginning with his first film role, aged three, playing Gérard's son in Claude Goretta's That Wonderful Crook (Pas si méchant que ça) in 1974. His next appearance beside his father was in Alain Corneau's Tous les matins du monde (1991) where they portrayed the same character at different ages—a performance that served as the younger Depardieu's breakthrough. The duo twice repeated this dynamic in television miniseries, playing younger and older versions of Edmond Dantès in Count of Monte Cristo (1998), and of Jean Valjean in Les Misérables (2000). In 2002, they co-starred in A Loving Father (Aime ton père), a film about a dysfunctional father-and-son relationship.

In 1993, Guillaume began a collaboration with director Pierre Salvadori, starring in his first feature film, Wild Target. He co-starred with François Cluzet in Salvadori's next film, the comedy The Apprentices (Les Apprentis, 1995) for which he won a César Award (France's national film award) as the most promising newcomer. The two partnered a third time for White Lies (1998). Several starring roles followed, notably in Leos Carax's Pola X which competed at the 1999 Cannes Film Festival. However, Depardieu's career was affected by his chaotic personal life which included drug addiction, several prison sentences and mounting health crises. He began staging a career comeback in 2007 with The Duchess of Langeais (Ne touchez pas la hache) and La France, followed by a role in the 2008 film On War (De la guerre). The latter film was released a few days before his death. Several other films were released posthumously.

== Personal life ==
Depardieu had a relationship with actress Clotilde Courau from 1997 to 1999, then married actress Elise Ventre on 30 December 1999. They had a daughter and separated in 2001. Depardieu was known to have had a strained relationship with his famous father, including a public falling out in 2003. He detailed their relationship in his 2004 autobiography Tout Donner (Giving Everything). Depardieu was said to have reconciled with his father shortly before his death.

Guillaume was often called an enfant terrible by the French magazine Paris Match and was called eccentric and bohemian by others. By 1993, he had already served two jail sentences for drug offences, which included dealing heroin and theft. In 2003, he was fined and given a nine-month suspended prison sentence for threatening a man with a gun. In 2008, he was arrested for driving his scooter while intoxicated.

In 1995, Depardieu crashed on his motorcycle when he ran over a suitcase that had fallen off a car and onto the roadway. He underwent surgery to repair damage to his knee. The wound developed a Staphylococcus aureus infection. Doctors performed seventeen subsequent operations in an attempt to clear the infection and save the leg; however, these efforts were unsuccessful, and Depardieu's leg was amputated above the knee in June 2003.

== Death ==
Depardieu's health was compromised by drug addiction, his 1995 motorcycle accident and subsequent surgeries. He contracted a severe viral pneumonia, caused by MRSA, while filming The Childhood of Icarus (L'Enfance d'Icare). He was unable to overcome the infection, and on 13 October 2008, died at the hospital in Garches, aged 37.

Gérard Depardieu later blamed his son's death on his first imprisonment for drug offenses, at age 17: he said that Guillaume had never recovered from the experience, and had been unfairly treated at the time by a "hateful" judge who wanted to put a Depardieu in jail. Gérard Depardieu commented: "They killed my son for two grams of heroin".

== Filmography ==
=== Cinema ===
Year	Film	Role	Notes
1974	Pas si méchant que ça	Guillaume	
1992	Tous les matins du monde	Young Marin Marais	Nominated – César Award for Most Promising Actor
1993	Wild Target	Antoine	
1995	Les apprentis	Fred	César Award for Most Promising Actor
1997	Marthe	Simon	
1997	Alliance cherche doigt	André Lechat	
1998	White Lies	Antoine	
1999	Pola X	Pierre	
2000	Elle et lui au 14e étage	Arthur	
2000	Les marchands de sable	Stéphane	
2001	Amour, prozac et autres curiosités	Willy	
2002	Once Upon an Angel	Grégoire	
2002	A Loving Father	Paul	
2002	Le pharmacien de garde	François Barrier	
2004	Process	Husband	
2006	Célibataires	Ben	
2007	The Duchess of Langeais	Armand de Montriveau	
2007	La France	François Robin	
2008	De la guerre		
2008	Versailles	Damien	
2008	Stella	Alain Bernard	
2008	Les inséparables	Boris	
2009	A Real Life		
2009	The Childhood of Icarus	Jonathan Vogel	(Final film role)

=== Television ===
Year	Film/series	Role	Notes
1996	Ricky		TV movie
1992	Le Lyonnais		TV series (1 episode)
1998	The Count of Monte Cristo	Young Edmond Dantès	Miniseries
2000	Les Misérables	Young Jean Valjean	Miniseries
2001	Caméra Café		TV series (1 episode)
2001	Zaïde, un petit air de vengeance		TV movie
2002	Napoleon	Jean-Baptiste Muiron	
2004	The Accursed Kings	King Louis X	Miniseries
2004	Milady	Athos	TV movie
2008	Château en Suède	Sébastien	TV movie

== Music Videos ==
Title	Year	Artist	Director
"Manu Chao"	2003	Les Wampas	Celia Canning & Joseph Dahan
"Y'a pas un homme qui soit né pour ça"	2004	Florent Pagny feat. Calogero and Pascal Obispo	Pascal Obispo

== Discography ==
- Post Mortem (2013)
