= Next Summer (film) =

- Directed by: Nadine Trintignant
- Written by: Nadine Trintignant
- Starring: Philippe Noiret; Claudia Cardinale
- Release date: 9 January 1985
- Running time: 100 minutes
- Country: France
- Language: French
- Box office: $2.8 million

Next Summer (French: L'été prochain) is a 1985 French drama film directed by Nadine Trintignant.

== Cast ==
- Philippe Noiret - Edouard
- Claudia Cardinale - Jeanne
- Fanny Ardant - Dina
- Jean-Louis Trintignant - Paul
- Marie Trintignant - Sidonie
- Jérôme Anger - Jude
- Pierre-Loup Rajot - Farou
- Hubert Deschamps - The neighbor
- Christian Marquand - Pierre
- Riton Liebman - Manuel
- Serge Marquand - Professor
- Benoît Régent - Doctor
- Judith Godrèche - Nickie
- Isabelle Mergault - Isabelle
