= Mr. Freedom =

1968 film by William Klein

- Film poster
- Directed by: William Klein
- Written by: William Klein
- Produced by: Guy Belfond; Christian Thivat; Michel Zemer
- Starring: John Abbey; Delphine Seyrig; Donald Pleasence; Philippe Noiret
- Cinematography: Pierre Lhomme
- Edited by: Anne-Marie Cotret; Valérie Mayoux; Monique Teisseire
- Music by: Serge Gainsbourg
- Distributed by: Films Paris-New York; Films du Rond-Point; O.P.E.R.A.
- Release dates: July 1968 (Festival d'Avignon); 8 January 1969 (France)
- Running time: 95 minutes
- Country: France
- Languages: English; French

Mr. Freedom is a 1969 French satirical superhero film written and directed by expatriate American photographer and filmmaker William Klein. An anti-imperialist farce, it concerns the exploits of the titular white nationalist superhero (John Abbey) and his sidekick, Marie-Madeleine (Delphine Seyrig), as they try to prevent a Communist takeover of France and solve the murder of a French superhero, Capitaine Formidable. In addition to Seyrig, the film features supporting roles and cameos by notable entertainers like Serge Gainsbourg (who also scored the film), Donald Pleasence, Philippe Noiret, Yves Montand and Simone Signoret.

== Plot ==
Mr. Freedom is a Washington D.C. police officer who drinks Colt 45 on duty and moonlights as a government-sanctioned, vigilante superhero. After the 1968 Washington, D.C., riots, he is summoned to the Freedom Tower — an office building housing the most powerful companies in the U.S. — to meet with Dr. Freedom, his handler, who informs him that another superhero, Capitaine Formidable, has been killed in France by operatives of the mysterious French Anti-Freedom (FAF) organization. Warning that this could be the first salvo in a Soviet invasion, Dr. Freedom dispatches Mr. Freedom to investigate his death and bring France back under the sway of western capitalist influences. As a last resort, Dr. Freedom equips him with "the Big One," a portable nuclear device to destroy the country in the event that it falls to Communist influence.

In France, Mr. Freedom joins forces with Capitaine Formidable's wife, the femme fatale Marie-Madeleine, to lead his own anti-communist Freedom organization. Marie-Madeleine explains that she and Capitaine Formidable ran a string of state-sponsored brothels, using the money they earned to finance anti-Communist activities while also gathering intelligence on the various diplomats and politicians who use their services. Arriving at a pro-USA rally, Mr. Freedom delivers an extended speech extolling the virtues of democracy and capitalism while also espousing white nationalist sympathies and warning of the encroaching influence of African Americans (whom he calls "niggers"), Jews, Asians, and other "undesirables" on the national stage. Assembling an army from the attendees of the rally, he expresses his intention not only to secure France against Communist influence, but also build a "white wall of freedom" around the United States.

Mr. Freedom travels to the U.S. embassy (a supermarket) to meet with the American ambassador to France, who warns him of the influence that a pair of foreign superheroes — the Russian Stalinist Moujik Man and Chinese Maoist Red China Man — have been exerting in the country. Mr. Freedom meets with his French counterpart, Super French Man (an inflatable), who expresses sympathies with their Communist ideologies, prompting Mr. Freedom to kill his sidekicks. Later he meets in a metro tunnel with Moujik Man and Red China Man (the latter a giant, talking Chinese Dragon/lion dog (another inflatable)) and the three discuss the virtues of their various political ideologies; Moujik Man makes friendly overtures to Mr. Freedom and disavows responsibility for the death of Capitaine Formidable. After he accidentally knocks himself unconscious, Moujik Man takes Mr. Freedom back to Communist Party headquarters to recuperate; after waking up, Mr. Freedom kills Moujik Man's girlfriend, Marie-Rouge.

Returning to Marie-Madeleine's apartment to have sex with her, Mr. Freedom suffers a crisis of conscience when her son calls him a fascist; he later realizes that his guilt is in fact coming from Red China Man, who is broadcasting subliminal messages to a radio receiver hidden in one of his teeth. After having the tooth removed, Mr. Freedom oversees the construction of a secret base from which his operatives can carry out anti-communist activities in France, and delivers a speech that works his followers into a violent frenzy, prompting them to begin looting, raping, and rioting. In response, the French begin holding anti-US demonstrations. Mr. Freedom opens fire into a crowd of peaceful protestors with a machine gun, to the horror of Marie-Madeleine, who subsequently reveals herself as an ally of Red Chinaman and a member of FAF. She further admits that she was the one who killed Capitaine Formidable. Mr. Freedom kills her, but FAF forces, demonstrators, and Moujik Man's soldiers — seeking revenge for Marie-Rouge's death — breach his compound and kill the rest of his followers.

Convinced that France neither desired nor deserved American democracy, Mr. Freedom detonates "The Big One." In a cutaway, Dr. Freedom reveals he'd actually supplied Mr. Freedom a "Medium One." The resulting explosion only took Mr. Freedom out, leaving everyone else unscathed. The French, meanwhile, continue their anti-US protest unfazed.

== Cast ==
- John Abbey as Mr. Freedom / Police Officer
- Delphine Seyrig as Marie-Madeleine
- Donald Pleasence as Dr. Freedom
- Jean-Claude Drouot as Dick Sensass
- Serge Gainsbourg as Mr. Drugstore
- Rufus as Freddie Fric
- Yves Lefebvre as Jacques Occident
- Sabine Sun as Betty Bopper
- Rita Maiden as False Hotel Maid
- Colin Drake as Teddy Tornado
- Pierre Baillot as Teddy Dripdry
- Raoul Billerey as Johnny Cadillac
- Philippe Noiret as Moujik Man
- Sami Frey as Jesus Christ
- Catherine Rouvel as Marie-Rouge
- Monique Chaumette as Virgin Mary
- Odile Astie as Odile Astier
- Albert Augier as Roger Marginal
- Jean-Claude Bouillaud as Dick Discount
- Michel Creton as Grand Duc Eddy
- Maria Lisa as Sheila In
- Guy D'Avout as Super French Man
- Albert Dray as Red China Man
- Henry Pillsbury as Joe Détergent

Uncredited

- Daniel Cohn-Bendit as Himself
- Yves Montand as Capt. Formidable
- Simone Signoret as FAF Soldier

== Reception ==
Fearing it might never be seen otherwise, Klein showed the film at the 1968 Avignon Festival. Marxist-Leninist groups criticized the political caricatures of Red China Man and other characters. In 2004, American film magazine Psychotronic Video appraised the "idea that the USA will destroy a country in order to save it is a true enough premise (then and now) but this political comedy is pretty hard to sit through."
