= The Open Road (novel) =

1951 novel by Jean Giono

- Author: Jean Giono
- Original title: Les Grands Chemins
- Translator: Paul Eprile
- Publisher: Éditions Gallimard
- Publication date: 1951
- English publication date: 17 August 2021
- Pages: 267

The Open Road (French: Les Grands Chemins) is a 1951 novel by the French writer Jean Giono. New York Review Books published it in English translation by Paul Eprile on 17 August 2021.

The Open Road was the basis for the 1963 film Of Flesh and Blood, directed by Christian Marquand.
