= Nadine Trintignant =

French writer and filmmaker (born 1934)

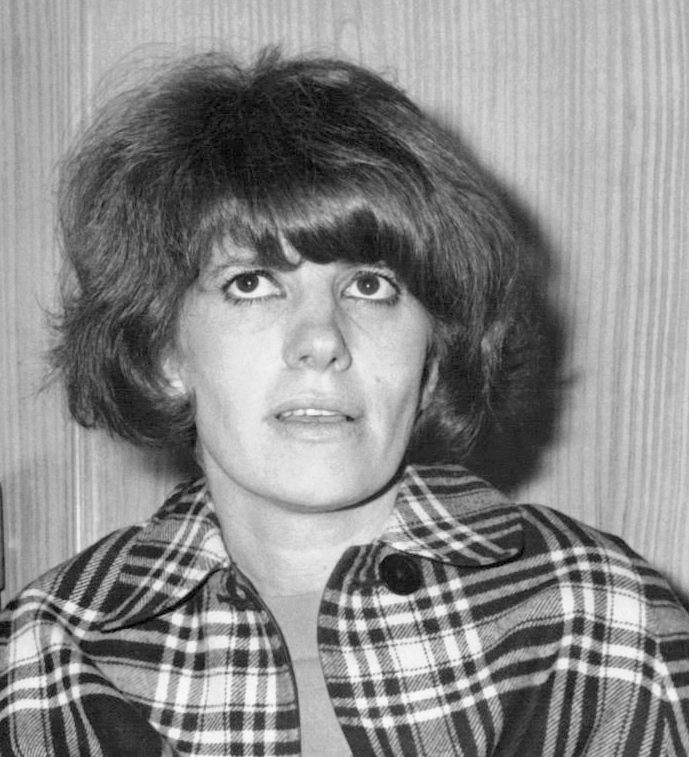
- Trintignant in 1968
- Born: Lucienne Marquand; 11 November 1934 (age 92); Nice, France
- Occupations: Film director; screenwriter; editor; author
- Spouses: Jean-Louis Trintignant (m. 1960; div. 1976) Alain Corneau (m. 1998; died 2010)
- Children: 3, including Marie Trintignant
- Relatives: Christian Marquand (brother); Serge Marquand (brother)

Nadine Trintignant, née Marquand (French: [nadin tʁɛ̃tiɲɑ̃]; born 11 November 1934), is a French filmmaker and novelist. She is known for making films that surround the topic of family and relationships, such as Ça n'arrive qu'aux autres and L'été prochain. Her film Mon amour, mon amour was nominated for the Palme d'Or at the 1967 Cannes Film Festival.

== Biography ==
Trintignant was born in Nice. She is the sister of the late actors Christian Marquand and Serge Marquand. In 1960, she married French actor Jean-Louis Trintignant, who had already starred in several of her early films. The couple had three children: a daughter, actress Marie Trintignant; another daughter, Pauline (who died as an infant); and a son, actor and screenwriter Vincent Trintignant-Corneau. They separated in 1976. Following their split, Nadine Trintignant started a relationship with French director Alain Corneau, who later adopted her children Marie and Vincent. Trintignant and Corneau lived together for 37 years until his death in 2010.

Trintignant has suffered the loss of two of her three children. In 1970, her nine-month-old daughter Pauline died of crib death, and in 2003 her older daughter Marie was murdered by her boyfriend, French musician Bertrand Cantat, during a domestic dispute.

In her films, Trintignant has focused on family and relationships, often borrowing from her own life. Much of her work took place during the 1970s, a time of great advancement for woman filmmakers in France. Trintignant's interest in feminist issues and the perils of the heterosexual couple can be seen in many of her films, such as Mon amour, mon amour (1967) and Le voyage des noces (1976). In 1971 she signed the Manifesto of the 343, published in the French magazine Le Nouvel Observateur. The article was signed by 343 women who admitted to having had abortions in order to end the ban on abortion and raise awareness of female reproductive rights.

== Career ==
=== Beginnings ===
At age 15, Trintignant's first experience with the film industry was as a lab assistant. Thereafter she held various small positions, mainly in editing, before turning to directing, with her first credited job as assistant editor of the 1955 film Du rififi chez les hommes. Following Rififi, Trintignant edited the films Si Paris nous était conté (1956), Une Parisienne (1957), Une Vie (1965), Léon Morin, Prêtre (1961), L'Eau à la bouche (1960), Le Coeur Battant (1961), Le Petit Soldat (1963), Les grands Chemins (1963), Le Chemin de la Mauvaise Route (1963), and Les Pas perdus (1964).

=== Film director ===
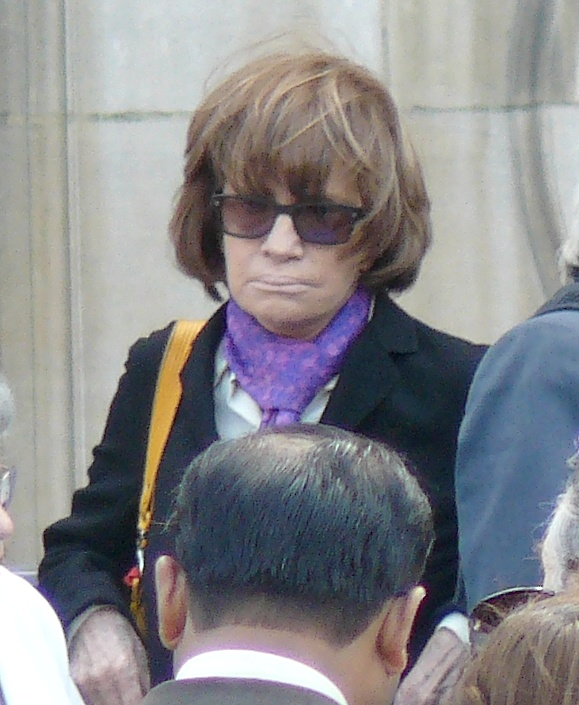
Trintignant in 2010

Trintignant made her directorial debut with her 1965 short film Fragilité, ton nom est femme. Two years later she wrote and directed Mon amour, mon amour, a dramatic film about a young woman's love affair with an architect and her secret struggle over whether to have an abortion. The film was nominated for the Palme d'Or at the 1967 Cannes Film Festival.

Following the death of her nine-month-old daughter Pauline in 1970, Trintignant wrote and directed Ça n’arrive qu’aux autres, a semi-autobiographical film related to her personal tragedy. The 1971 film starred Catherine Deneuve and Marcello Mastroianni as a couple coping with the death of their infant daughter. Trintignant blurred the boundaries between fiction and her life in several ways: she cast her brother Serge Marquand as Deneuve's character's brother, included her older daughter Marie in several scenes, and used actual images and footage of her daughter Pauline to depict the deceased child in the film.

Trintignant's next film, Défense de savoir, was released in 1973, followed by Le Voyage de noces in 1976. In the 1980s she wrote and directed many films focusing on relationships through a feminist lens, such as Premier Voyage (1980), L'été prochain (1985), and La maison de Jade (1988), despite the fact that according to critics such as Nina Darnton of The New York Times, the "fire of the women's liberation movement [was] no longer fanned to so bright a flame" by then.

In 1991 Trintignant joined 30 filmmakers to create Contre L'Oubli for Amnesty International. The project consisted of 30 short films, each directed by a different filmmaker paired with a public personality and dedicated to make a plea for human rights, focusing on a specific political prisoner. Trintignant collaborated with her daughter Marie for the segment on José Ramon Garcia-Gomez of Mexico.

In the 1990s and 2000s Trintignant continued to make films in collaboration with her family: Rêveuse Jeunesse (1994) and Fugeuses (1995) starred Marie; L'insoumise (1996) starred both Marie and Jean-Louis Trintignant, and was co-written by their son Vincent; and L'île Bleu was co-written again with Vincent. Trintignant's most recent directorial credit is the 2003 film Colette, une femme libre, a film that once again starred Marie. Marie's sudden death occurred during the film's production, but her scenes had already been shot, so Trintignant completed the film and dedicated it to her daughter.

=== Novelist ===
Trintignant has written several novels, including Ton Chapeau au vestiaire (1997), Combien d'enfants (2001), and Le Jeune homme de la rue de France (2002). After her daughter Marie died, Trintignant wrote the memoir Marie, ma fille (2003). She has since written several books about her personal life: her autobiography J'ai été jeune un jour (2006); a collection of short stories depicting her pain after Marie's death, Une étrange peine (2007); a memoir of her late partner Alain Corneau, Vers d'autres matins (2012); and an homage to her mother, La voilette de ma mère (2014).

== Filmography ==
Year	Original film title	English film title	Credited as	Notes
1955	Du rififi chez les hommes	Rififi	Assistant editor	as Nadine Marquand
1956	Si Paris nous était conté	If Paris Were Told to Us	Assistant editor	as Nadine Marquand
1957	Une Parisienne	La Parisienne	Assistant editor	as N. Marquand
1958	Une Vie	End of Desire	Assistant editor	as Nadine Marquand
1960	L'Eau à la bouche		Editor	as Nadine Marquand
1961	Léon Morin, Prêtre	Léon Morin, Priest	Assistant editor	as Nadine Marquand
1961	Le coeur battant		Editor, Script Supervisor	as Nadine Marquand
1962	Twist Parade		Editor	Documentary Short
1963	Le Petit Soldat	The Little Soldier	Editor	as Nadine Marquand
1963	Les grands chemins	Of Flesh and Blood	Editor	
1963	Le chemin de la mauvaise route		Editor	Documentary
1964	Les pas perdus	The Last Steps	Editor	
1965	Fragilité, ton nom est femme		Director, writer	Short
1967	Mon amour, mon amour	My Love, My Love	Director, writer	
1969	Le voleur de crimes	Crime Thief	Director, writer, producer	as Nadine Marquand Trintignant
1971	Ça n'arrive qu'aux autres	It Only Happens to Others	Director, writer	as Nadine Marquand Trintignant
1973	Défense de savoir		Director, writer	as Nadine Marquand Trintignant
1976	Le Voyage de noces	The Honeymoon Trip	Director, writer	as Nadine Marquand Trintignant
1978	Madame le juge (TV series)		Director	Episode: "Un innocent"
1980	Premier voyage	First Voyage	Director, writer	as Nadine Marquand-Trintignant
1981	Le vieil homme et la ville		Director, writer	Short
1985	L'été prochain	Next Summer	Director, writer	
1987	Qui c'est ce garçon? (TV miniseries)		Director, writer	2 episodes: #1.1, #1.2
1987	Le tiroir secret (TV miniseries)	The Secret Drawer	Director	Episode: "La mise au point"
1988	La maison de jade	The House of Jade	Director, writer	
1991	Contre l'oubli	Lest We Forget	Director	Segment: "José Ramon Garcia-Gomez, Mexique"
1993	Lucas		Director, writer	Television movie
1994	Rêveuse jeunesse		Director, writer	TV movie
1995	Fugeuses	Runaways	Director, writer	
1995	Lumière et compagnie	Lumière and Company	Director	Documentary
1996	L'insoumise		Director, writer	TV movie
2000	Victoire, ou la douleur des femmes (TV miniseries)		Director, writer	
2001	L'île bleue		Director, writer	Television movie
2004	Colette, une femme libre (TV miniseries)		Director, writer	
2009	Cadeau de rupture		Writer (Short Story)	Short

== Awards and nominations ==
Trintignant's 1967 film Mon amour, mon amour, which she wrote and directed, was nominated for the Palme d'Or at the Cannes Film Festival that year.
