= Helvio Soto =

Chilean filmmaker (1930-2001)

- Born: Helvio Ricarte Soto Soto; February 21, 1930; Santiago, Chile
- Died: November 29, 2001 (aged 71); Santiago, Chile
- Education: University of Chile
- Occupation: Film director

Helvio Ricarte Soto Soto (February 21, 1930 – November 29, 2001) was a Chilean filmmaker, regarded as one of the most important figures in Chilean cinema during the mid-1960s and 1970s. He was also the father of prominent Chilean journalist Ricarte Soto.

== Early life ==
Born to Luis Soto and Leonita Soto, he studied law, but never practiced. Drawn early on to the world of communication, he left Chile at a young age, working as an assistant on films shot in Argentina and taking up radio work in Ecuador. He also published several books, including Semana a semana, which received moderate critical attention.

== Career ==
By the time he returned to Chile, the national film scene was experiencing an unprecedented resurgence. The introduction of 16 mm cameras and new sociopolitical ideas brought fresh energy to filmmaking, not only in Chile, but throughout Latin America. His first film, Yo tenía un camarada (1964), was influenced by Italian neorealism and social themes, and was made with the support of the Experimental Cinema program at the University of Chile.

At the time, Experimental Cinema brought together a generation of young filmmakers who began portraying reality on-screen as never before. Figures like Pedro Chaskel (editing), Héctor Ríos (cinematography), and Gustavo Becerra (music) formed the core of this influential circle, which also launched the careers of Raúl Ruiz, Miguel Littín, Álvaro Ramírez, Carlos Flores Espinoza, Leonardo Céspedes, and a broad group of documentarians who would go on to define the New Chilean Cinema.

After several short films, Soto directed his first feature, Lunes 1°, domingo 7, with cinematography by Fernando Bellet. He followed this with his most controversial and remembered film, Caliche sangriento (1969). The film was censored by the government of Eduardo Frei Montalva under military pressure, and only released after an agreement was reached to remove title cards considered offensive at the time. Although the controversy gave the film considerable exposure, it received little press coverage once released.

After Salvador Allende assumed the presidency in 1970, Soto was appointed to an administrative position at Televisión Nacional de Chile, where he also directed several television series. In 1971, he released his next feature film, Voto + fusil, a critical examination of Chilean history that was met with a mixed response. He then began work on a film blending fiction and documentary, but it was never shown in Chile due to the 1973 military coup, which abruptly ended the country's democratic process. That film, known as Metamorfosis del jefe de la policía política, premiered in Europe, but received an indifferent response, in part because it critiqued the political divisions within the Chilean left.

His first "European" production would become the biggest success of his career. Llueve sobre Santiago (1975), which depicted the days leading up to the coup, as well as torture, kidnappings, and disappearances, was acclaimed across Europe, Asia, and North America, but was banned in Chile under the military regime. Soto went into exile and would not return to Chile until the 1990s, when he fully devoted himself to mentoring a new generation of filmmakers.

He spent his final years teaching, delivering masterclasses where he emphasized that a commitment to art was essential for understanding cinema as a form of expression rather than a commercial product.

== Filmography ==
=== Feature films ===
- Yo tenía un camarada (1964)
- El Analfabeto (1965)
- Ana (1) (1965)
- El ABC del amor (1966)
- Érase un niño, un guerrillero, un caballo… (1967)
- Lunes 1°, domingo 7 (1968)
- Caliche sangriento (1969)
- Voto + fusil (1971)
- Metamorfosis del jefe de la policía política (1973)
- Llueve sobre Santiago (1975)
- La triple muerte del tercer personaje (1979)
- Americonga: Mon ami Washington (1986)

=== Television ===
- Amalia (1967)
- El socio (1968)
- El loco Estero (1968)
- Santiago City (1997)
