= Jean-Louis Trintignant =

French actor (1930–2022)

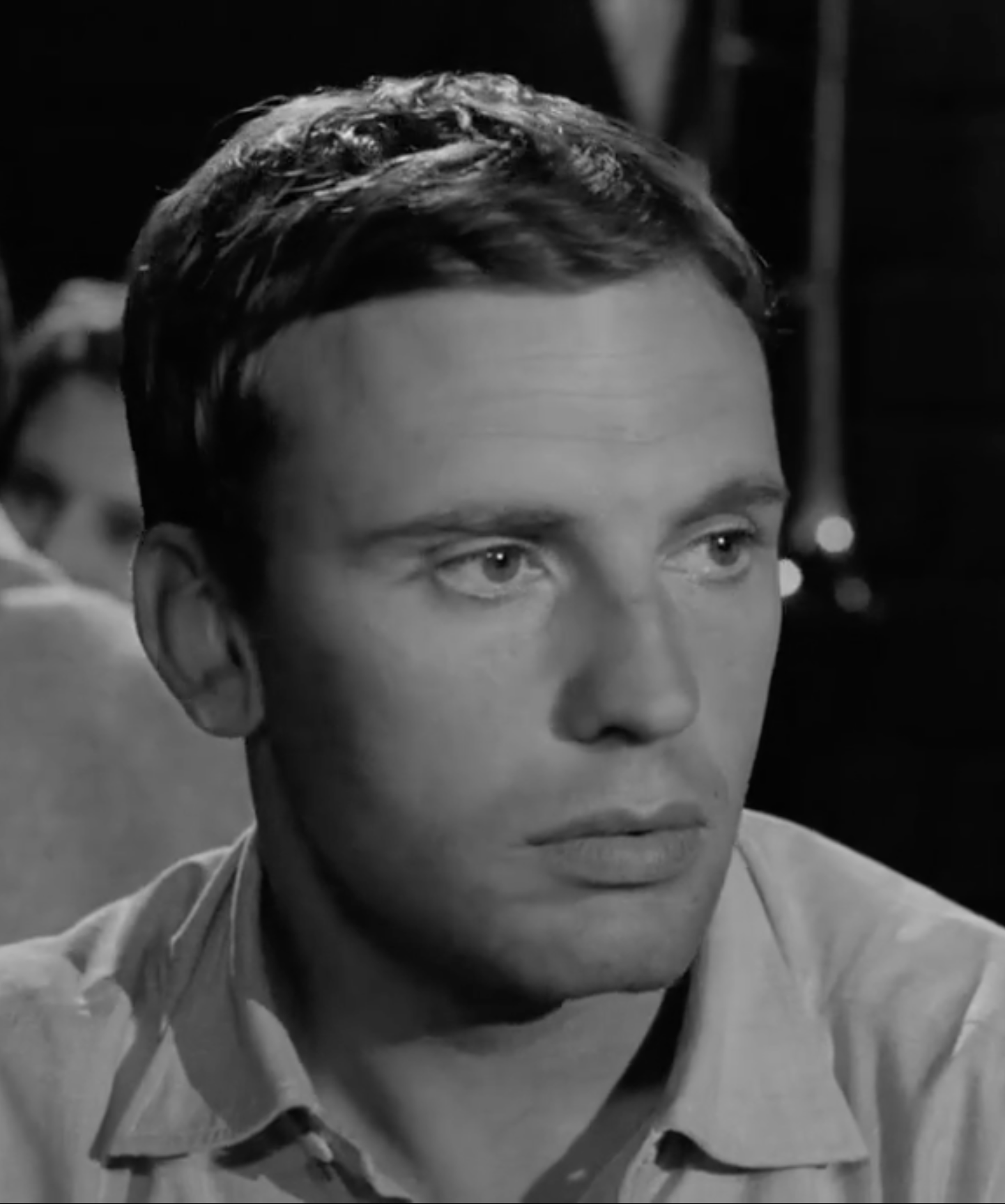
- Trintignant in Il Sorpasso (1962)
- Born: Jean-Louis Xavier Trintignant; 11 December 1930; Piolenc, France
- Died: 17 June 2022 (aged 91); Collias, France
- Education: Institut des hautes études cinématographiques
- Occupations: Actor; film director; racecar driver
- Years active: 1951–2019
- Spouses: Stéphane Audran (m. 1954; div. 1956) Nadine Marquand (m. 1960; div. 1976) Marianne Hoepfner (m. 2000)
- Children: 3, including Marie

Jean-Louis Xavier Trintignant (French pronunciation: [ʒɑ̃ lwi tʁɛ̃tiɲɑ̃]; 11 December 1930 – 17 June 2022) was a French actor. He made his theatrical debut in 1951, and went on to be regarded as one of the best French dramatic actors of the postwar era. He starred in many classic films of European cinema, and worked with many prominent auteur directors, including Roger Vadim, Costa-Gavras, Claude Lelouch, Claude Chabrol, Bernardo Bertolucci, Éric Rohmer, François Truffaut, Dino Risi, Krzysztof Kieślowski, and Michael Haneke.

He made a critical and commercial breakthrough in And God Created Woman (1956), followed by a starmaking romantic turn in A Man and a Woman (1966). He won the Silver Bear for Best Actor at the 1968 Berlin International Film Festival for his performance in The Man Who Lies and the Best Actor Award at the 1969 Cannes Film Festival for Costa-Gavras's Z. Trintignant's other notable films include The Great Silence (1968), My Night at Maud's (1969), The Conformist (1970), Three Colours: Red (1994), and The City of Lost Children (1995). He won the 2013 César Award for Best Actor for his role in Michael Haneke's Amour.

== Early life ==
Trintignant was born on 11 December 1930 in Piolenc, Vaucluse. He had a brother four years older. During World War II, his father joined the resistance against the Nazi regime by aiding Jews, and his mother began an affair with a Nazi officer. This horizontal collaboration affected Jean-Louis his entire life.

He grew up with the intention of studying law and enrolled in Aix-Marseille University. However, he soon discovered an interest in acting and moved to Paris at the age of 20 to study drama, making his theatrical debut in 1951.

== Career ==
After touring in the early 1950s in several theatre productions, his first motion picture appearance came in 1955, and the following year he gained stardom with his performance opposite Brigitte Bardot in Roger Vadim's And God Created Woman. Trintignant's acting was interrupted for several years by mandatory military service. After serving in Algiers, he returned to Paris and resumed his work in film. He had the leading male role in Claude Lelouch's film A Man and a Woman (Un homme et une femme, 1966), which was the most commercially successful French film internationally for some years.

In Italy, he was always dubbed into Italian, and he worked with Italian directors including Sergio Corbucci in The Great Silence, Valerio Zurlini in Violent Summer and The Desert of the Tartars, Ettore Scola in La terrazza, Bernardo Bertolucci in The Conformist, and Dino Risi in The Easy Life.

Throughout the 1970s, Trintignant starred in many films, including the English-language films The Outside Man in 1971 and Under Fire in 1983. Following this, he starred in François Truffaut's final film, Confidentially Yours, and reprised his best-known role in the sequel A Man and a Woman: 20 Years Later (Un homme et une femme, 20 ans déjà, 1986).

In 1994, he starred in Krzysztof Kieślowski's final film, Three Colors: Red. For the remainder of his career, he took an occasional film role but focused on stage work. After a 9-year gap, Trintignant came back to the screen for Michael Haneke's film Amour. Haneke sent Trintignant the screenplay, which had been written specifically for him. Trintignant said he chose film projects based on the director and said of Haneke that "he has the most complete mastery of the cinematic discipline, from technical aspects like sound and photography to the way he handles actors". He worked with Haneke again in 2017 when he starred in Happy End.

On 20 July 2018, Trintignant announced his retirement from cinema, but, in March 2019, he accepted a role in Claude Lelouch's film The Best Years of a Life (Les plus belles années d'une vie), a follow-up to A Man and a Woman and its sequel A Man and a Woman: 20 Years Later.

== Personal life ==
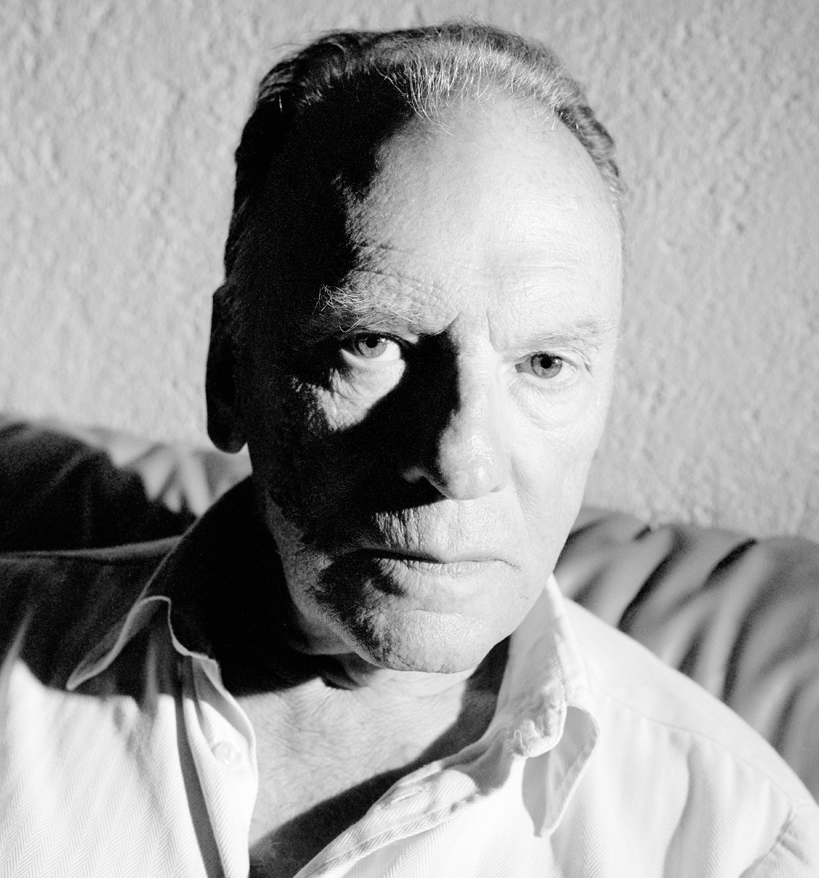
Trintignant in 2007

Trintignant came from a wealthy family. He was the nephew of racing driver Louis Trintignant, who was killed in 1933 while practising on the Péronne racetrack in Picardy. Another uncle, Maurice Trintignant (1917–2005), was a Formula One driver who twice won the Monaco Grand Prix as well as the 24 hours of Le Mans. Jean-Louis himself was an enthusiastic amateur rally driver and competed in a number of high-level rallies in the 1970s and 1980s, including several rounds of the World Rally Championship; he finished first in his class in the 1981 Monte Carlo Rally. Raised in and around automobile racing, Trintignant was the natural choice of film director Claude Lelouch for the starring role of a racing driver in the 1966 film A Man and a Woman. He suffered a leg injury from a motorbike accident in June 2007.

His first wife was actress Stéphane Audran. His second wife, Nadine Marquand, was an actress, screenwriter, and director. They had three children: Vincent, Pauline (who died of crib death in 1969), and Marie Trintignant (21 January 1962 – 1 August 2003). At age 17, Marie performed in La terrazza alongside her father and later became a successful actress. She was killed at the age of 41 by her boyfriend, rock musician Bertrand Cantat, in a hotel room in Vilnius, Lithuania.

In 2018, Trintignant announced that he was diagnosed with prostate cancer and would not be seeking treatment. In November 2021, it was reported that he was gradually losing his sight and was in declining health. He died at his home on 17 June 2022, at the age of 91.

== Filmography ==
Year	Title	Role	Director	Notes
1955	If All the Guys in the World	Jean-Louis	Christian-Jaque	
1956	La Loi des rues	Yves Tréguier	Ralph Habib	
1956	And God Created Woman	Michel Tardieu	Roger Vadim	
1956	Women's Club	Michel	Ralph Habib	
1959	Les liaisons dangereuses	Danceny	Roger Vadim	
1959	Violent Summer	Carlo Caremoli	Valerio Zurlini	
1960	Austerlitz	Ségur junior	Abel Gance	
1961	Pleins feux sur l'assassin	Jean-Marie de Kerloguen	Georges Franju	
1961	Journey Beneath the Desert	Pierre	Edgar G. Ulmer	
1962	Horace 62	Joseph Fabiani	André Versini	
1962	Le Combat dans l'île	Clément Lesser	Alain Cavalier	
1962	Il Sorpasso	Roberto Mariani	Dino Risi	
1963	Château en Suède	Éric	Roger Vadim	
1964	The Last Steps	Joe	Jacques Robin	
1964	Mata Hari, Agent H21	François Lasalle	Jean-Louis Richard	
1965	The Sleeping Car Murders	Éric Grandin	Costa-Gavras	
1966	A Man and a Woman	Jean-Louis Duroc	Claude Lelouch	
1966	Diamond Safari	Raphaële Vincente	Michel Drach	
1966	La Longue Marche	Philippe	Alexandre Astruc	
1966	Trans-Europ-Express	Elias	Alain Robbe-Grillet	
1967	Un homme à abattre	Raphaël	Philippe Condroyer	
1967	Col cuore in gola	Bernard	Tinto Brass	
1967	My Love, My Love	Vincent Falaise	Nadine Trintignant	
1968	Death Laid an Egg	Marco	Giulio Questi	
1968	Les Biches	Paul Thomas	Claude Chabrol	
1968	The Man Who Lies	Jan Robin / Boris Varissa	Alain Robbe-Grillet	
1968	The Great Silence	Gordon ("Silence")	Sergio Corbucci	
1968	The Libertine	Carlo De Marchi	Pasquale Festa Campanile	
1969	Z	Christos Sartzetakis	Costa-Gavras	
1969	Metti, una sera a cena	Michele	Giuseppe Patroni Griffi	
1969	My Night at Maud's	Jean-Louis	Éric Rohmer	
1969	L'Américain	Bruno	Marcel Bozzuffi	
1969	So Sweet... So Perverse	Jean Reynaud	Umberto Lenzi	
1970	The Conformist	Marcello Clerici	Bernardo Bertolucci	
1970	Le Voyou	Simon Duroc	Claude Lelouch	
1971	Ramparts of Clay	the entrepreneur	Jean-Louis Bertucelli	
1971	L'Opium et le Bâton	Chaudier	Ahmed Rachedi	
1971	Without Apparent Motive	Stéphane Carella	Philippe Labro	
1972	...and Hope to Die	Antoine Cardot	René Clément	
1972	The Assassination	François Darien	Yves Boisset	
1972	The Outside Man	Lucien Bellon	Jacques Deray	
1973	The Train	Julien Maroyeur	Pierre Granier-Deferre	
1973	A Full Day's Work		directed	
1974	Violins at the Ball	Michel	Michel Drach	
1974	Successive Slidings of Pleasure	the police officer	Alain Robbe-Grillet	
1974	Le Mouton enragé	Nicolas Mallet	Michel Deville	
1974	The Secret	David Daguerre	Robert Enrico	
1975	L'Agression	Paul Varlin	Gérard Pirès	
1975	Flic Story	Émile Buisson	Jacques Deray	
1975	Il pleut sur Santiago	Senator	Helvio Soto	
1975	Playing with Fire	le bel homme / l'homme de main	Alain Robbe-Grillet	
1975	The Sunday Woman	Massimo Campi	Luigi Comencini	
1976	The Desert of the Tartars	Rovin	Valerio Zurlini	
1976	Le Voyage de noces	Paul Carter	Nadine Trintignant	
	L'Ordinateur des pompes funèbres	Fred Malon	Gérard Pirès	
1977	The Passengers	Alex Moineau	Serge Leroy	
1977	Repérages	Victor	Michel Soutter	
1978	L'Argent des autres	Henri Rainier	Christian de Chalonge	
1980	The Lady Banker	Horace Vannister	Francis Girod	
1980	La terrazza	Enrico D'Orsi	Ettore Scola	
1980	Je vous aime	Julien	Claude Berri	
1981	Un assassin qui passe	Ravic	Michel Vianey	
1981	Passion of Love	the doctor	Ettore Scola	
1981	Malevil	Fulbert	Christian de Chalonge	
1981	Eaux profondes	Vic Allen	Michel Deville	
1982	Le Grand Pardon	Commissaire Duché	Alexandre Arcady	
1982	Boulevard des assassins	Daniel Salmon	Boramy Tioulong	
1982	Blow to the Heart	Dario	Gianni Amelio	
1982	The Night at Varennes	Monsieur Sauce	Ettore Scola	
1983	Confidentially Yours	Julien Vercel	François Truffaut	
1983	La Crime	Christian Lacassagne	Philippe Labro	
1983	Under Fire	Marcel Jazy	Roger Spottiswoode	
1984	Viva la vie!	François Gaucher	Claude Lelouch	
1985	Next Summer	Paul	Nadine Trintignant	
1985	Partir, revenir	Roland Rivière	Claude Lelouch	
1985	Rendez-vous	Scrutzler	André Téchiné	
1985	L'Homme aux yeux d'argent	Mayene	Pierre Granier-Deferre	
1986	A Man and a Woman: 20 Years Later	Jean-Louis Duroc	Claude Lelouch	
1986	La Femme de ma vie	Pierre	Régis Wargnier	
1987	The Ghost Valley	Paul	Alain Tanner	
1989	Bunker Palace Hôtel	Holm	Enki Bilal	
1991	Merci la vie	SS officier	Bertrand Blier	
1994	Three Colours: Red	Joseph Kern	Krzysztof Kieślowski	
1995	The City of Lost Children	Uncle Irvin	Jean-Pierre Jeunet and Marc Caro	Voice only
1995	Fiesta	Colonel Masagual	Pierre Boutron	
1996	A Self Made Hero	Albert Dehousse (the matured one)	Jacques Audiard	
1998	Those Who Love Me Can Take the Train	Lucien Emmerich / Jean-Baptiste Emmerich	Patrice Chéreau	
2003	Janis et John	Monsieur Cannon	Samuel Benchetrit	
2012	Amour	Georges	Michael Haneke	
2017	Happy End	Georges Laurent	Michael Haneke	
2019	The Best Years of a Life	Jean-Louis Duroc	Claude Lelouch	Final film released during Trintignant's lifetime
2024	The Most Precious of Cargoes	Narrator (voice)	Michel Hazanavicius	Posthumous release; final film role

== Awards and honours ==
Year	Award	Category	Nominated work	Result	Ref.
1968	Berlin International Film Festival	Silver Bear for Best Actor	The Man Who Lies	Won	
1969	Cannes Film Festival	Best Actor	Z	Won	
1986	César Award	Best Supporting Actor	La Femme de ma vie	Nominated	
1994	César Award	Best Actor	Three Colors: Red	Nominated	
1995	César Award	Best Actor	Fiesta	Nominated	
1998	César Award	Best Supporting Actor	Those Who Love Me Can Take the Train	Nominated	
2012	César Award	Best Actor	Amour	Won	
2012	European Film Award	Best Actor	Amour	Won	
2012	Lumière Awards	Best Actor	Amour	Won	
2012	Globes de Cristal Award	Best Actor	Amour	Nominated	
2012	International Cinephile Society Award	Best Actor	Amour	Nominated	
2012	London Film Critics Circle Award	Best Actor of the Year	Amour	Nominated	
