= Le Splendid =

Café-théâtre in Paris, France

Coordinates: 48°52′15″N 2°21′24″E

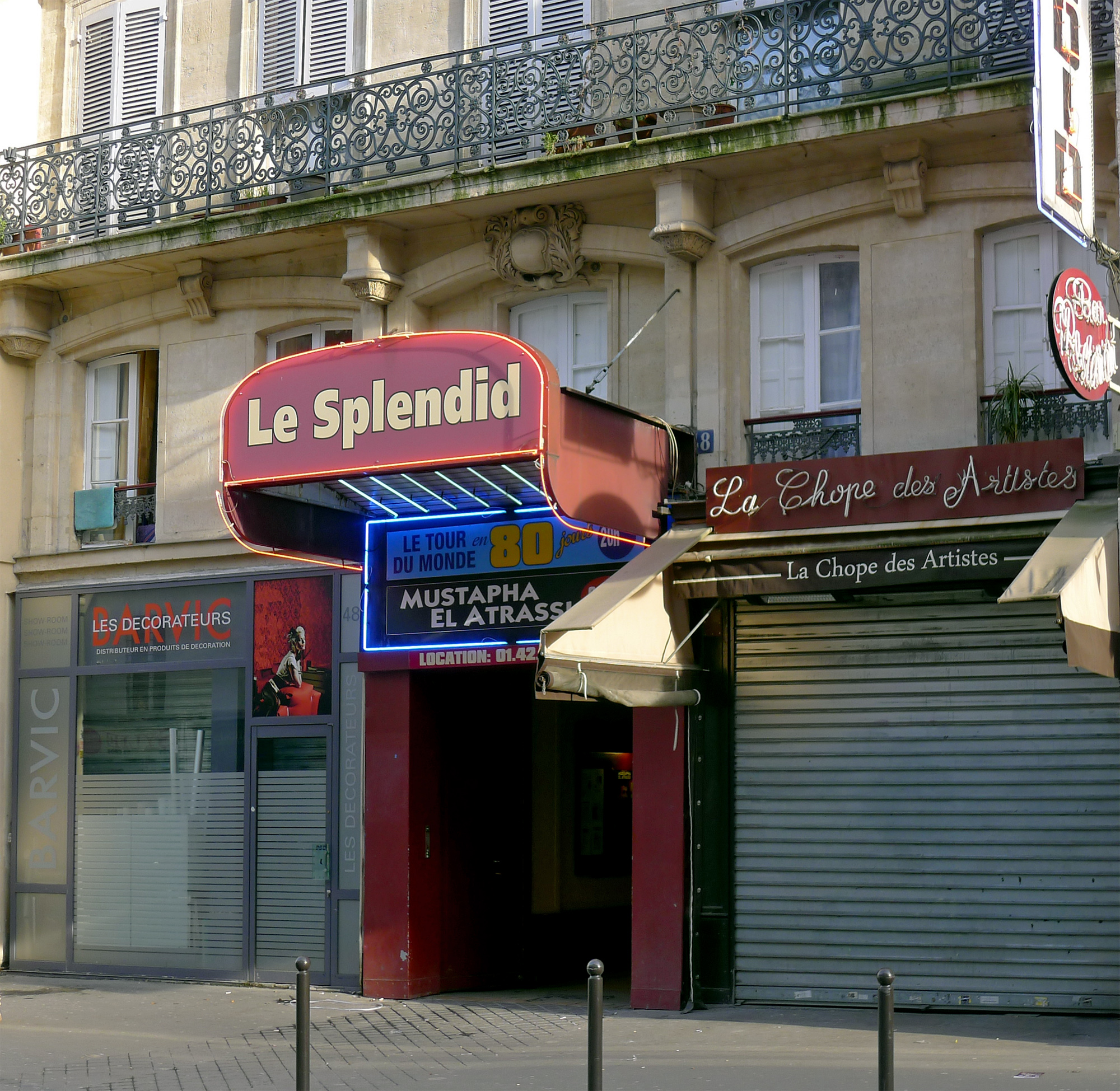
The theatre building on the Rue du Faubourg-Saint-Martin in Paris

Le Splendid is a café-théâtre founded in Paris by a collection of writers and actors in the 1970s: Christian Clavier, Michel Blanc, Gérard Jugnot, Thierry Lhermitte (four childhood friends who knew one another from the Lycée Pasteur in Neuilly-sur-Seine), Josiane Balasko, Marie-Anne Chazel, Bruno Moynot and Claire Magnin. The members of the company went on to become some of the most significant actors and directors in French cinema from the 1980s onwards and have collectively won many César Awards.

Anémone, Dominique Lavanant and Martin Lamotte have often worked with the troupe on stage and in films, but were not part of the collective. The café-théâtre was located in the Rue des Lombards in the 4th arrondissement of Paris.

== Members ==
=== Main members ===
- Josiane Balasko
- Michel Blanc
- Marie-Anne Chazel
- Christian Clavier
- Gérard Jugnot
- Thierry Lhermitte

=== Collaborators ===
- Anémone
- Dominique Lavanant
- Bruno Moynot
- Martin Lamotte

== Theatre ==
- Je Vais Craquer
- Ma Tête est Malade
- Le Pot de Terre Contre le Pot de Vin
- Bunny's Bar ou Les Hommes Préfèrent Les Grosses (adapted into film 1981)
- Amours, coquillages et crustacés (stage version of the film Les Bronzés)
- Le Père Noël est une ordure

== Filmography ==
- 1978 : French Fried Vacation directed by Patrice Leconte
- 1979 : French Fried Vacation 2 directed by Patrice Leconte
- 1982 : Santa Claus Is a Stinker directed by Jean-Marie Poiré
- 1983 : Gramps Is in the Resistance directed by Jean-Marie Poiré
- 1994 : Dead Tired directed by Michel Blanc
- 2006 : French Fried Vacation 3 directed by Patrice Leconte

Individually each member of Le Splendid has had a successful career, collectively comprising hundreds of films and plays.

== Box-office ==
Movies starring one or all members of the Splendid with more than a million of ticket sales.

	Films	Director	Members	Year	Tickets sold (France)
1	Asterix & Obelix: Mission Cleopatra	Alain Chabat	Clavier	2002	14,559,509
2	Les Visiteurs	Jean-Marie Poiré	Clavier & Chazel	1993	13,782,991
3	Serial (Bad) Weddings	Philippe de Chauveron	Clavier	2014	12,361,430
4	French Fried Vacation 3	Patrice Leconte	All	2006	10,355,930
5	The Dinner Game	Francis Veber	Lhermitte	1998	9,247,001
6	Asterix & Obelix Take On Caesar	Claude Zidi	Clavier	1999	8,948,624
7	The Chorus	Christophe Barratier	Jugnot	2004	8,636,016
8	The Visitors II: The Corridors of Time	Jean-Marie Poiré (2)	Clavier & Chazel	1998	8,043,129
9	Un indien dans la ville	Hervé Palud	Lhermitte	1994	7,870,802
10	Marche à l'ombre	Michel Blanc	Blanc	1984	6,168,425
11	My New Partner	Claude Zidi (2)	Lhermitte	1984	5,882,397
12	Les Anges gardiens	Jean-Marie Poiré (3)	Clavier	1995	5,793,034
13	Going Places	Bertrand Blier	Lhermitte & Jugnot	1974	5,726,031
14	Little Nicholas	Laurent Tirard	Jugnot	2009	5,520,562
15	The Closet	Francis Veber (2)	Lhermitte	2001	5,317,858
16	The New Adventures of Aladdin	Arthur Benzaquen	Blanc	2015	4,424,083
17	Gramps Is in the Resistance	Jean-Marie Poiré (4)	Clavier, Jugnot, Balasko, Blanc & Lhermitte	1983	4,104,082
18	French Twist	Josiane Balasko	Balasko	1995	3,990,094
19	Serial Teachers	Pierre-François Martin-Laval	Clavier	2013	3,957,176
20	Asterix and Obelix: God Save Britannia	Laurent Tirard (2)	Jugnot	2012	3,820,404
21	Je vous trouve très beau	Isabelle Mergault	Blanc	2005	3,567,222
22	Babysitting 2	Nicolas Benamou & Philippe Lacheau	Clavier	2015	3,203,541
23	Animal	Claude Zidi (3)	Balasko	1977	3,157,789
24	Tenue de soirée	Bertrand Blier (2)	Blanc	1986	3,144,799
25	Le Maître d'école	Claude Berri	Balasko	1981	3,015,596
26	Herbie Goes to Monte Carlo	Vincent McEveety	Jugnot & Balasko	1977	2,977,303
27	My New Partner II	Claude Zidi (4)	Lhermitte	1990	2,917,115
28	Didier	Alain Chabat (2)	Balasko	1997	2,902,960
29	Viens chez moi, j'habite chez une copine	Patrice Leconte (2)	Blanc & Chazel	1981	2,820,169
30	L'Enquête Corse	Alain Berbérian	Clavier	2004	2,667,275
31	The Vengeance of the Winged Serpent	Gérard Oury	Balasko	1984	2,663,303
32	Uranus	Arlette Langmann & Claude Berri (2)	Blanc	1990	2,545,412
33	Neuilly Yo Mama!	Gabriel Julien-Laferrière	Balasko	2009	2,517,140
34	The Umbrella Coup	Gérard Oury (2)	Jugnot	1980	2,451,606
35	Pinot simple flic	Gérard Jugnot	Jugnot	1984	2,418,756
36	The Lady Banker	Francis Girod	Lhermitte	1980	2,394,073
37	Babysitting	Nicolas Benamou & Philippe Lacheau (2)	Jugnot	2014	2,358,733
38	French Fried Vacation	Patrice Leconte (3)	All	1978	2,308,644
39	The Visitors: Bastille Day	Jean-Marie Poiré (5)	Clavier & Chazel	2016	2,188,217
40	The Joint Brothers	Hervé Palud (2)	Balasko	1986	2,179,370
41	A Crime in Paradise	Jean Becker	Balasko	2001	2,137,829
42	Back to Mom's	Éric Lavaine	Balasko	2016	2,120,106
43	Pardon Mon Affaire, Too!	Yves Robert	Balasko	1977	2,080,789
44	La Vengeance d'une blonde	Jeannot Szwarc	Clavier, Chazel & Lhermitte	1994	2,039,370
45	Too Beautiful for You	Bertrand Blier (3)	Balasko	1989	2,031,131
46	Dead Tired	Michel Blanc (2)	All	1994	2,015,230
47	Men Prefer Fat Girls	Jean-Marie Poiré (6)	Balasko & Lhermitte	1981	1,931,038
48	Le zèbre	Jean Poiret	Lhermitte	1992	1,866,623
49	Pas de problème !	Georges Lautner	Jugnot	1975	1,810,393
50	La 7ème compagnie au clair de lune	Robert Lamoureux	Jugnot	1977	1,792,134
51	Monsieur Batignole	Gérard Jugnot (2)	Jugnot	2002	1,773,472
52	Cours après moi ... que je t'attrape	Robert Pouret	Chazel & Blanc	1976	1,755,935
53	Scout toujours...	Gérard Jugnot (3)	Jugnot	1985	1,755,081
54	Une époque formidable...	Gérard Jugnot (4)	Jugnot	1991	1,672,754
55	La Totale!	Claude Zidi (5)	Lhermitte	1991	1,639,813
56	French Fried Vacation 2	Patrice Leconte (4)	All	1982	1,582,732
57	La nouvelle guerre des boutons	Christophe Barratier (2)	Jugnot	2011	1,542,231
58	Santa Claus Is a Stinker	Jean-Marie Poiré (7)	All	1979	1,535,781
59	Summer Things	Michel Blanc (3)	Blanc	2002	1,528,784
60	La Soif de l'or	Gérard Oury (3)	Clavier	1993	1,517,890
61	Les Rois du gag	Claude Zidi (6)	Jugnot & Lhermitte	1985	1,510,930
62	Le mariage du siècle	Philippe Galland	Lhermitte	1985	1,493,351
63	My Best Friend's Girl	Bertrand Blier (4)	Lhermitte	1983	1,485,746
64	L'opération Corned Beef	Jean-Marie Poiré (8)	Clavier	1991	1,475,580
65	The Race	Djamel Bensalah	Balasko & Jugnot	2002	1,456,267
66	Asterix and the Big Fight	Philippe Grimond	Chazel	1989	1,442,311
67	The Well-Digger's Daughter	Daniel Auteuil	Chazel	2011	1,401,319
68	Le coup de sirocco	Alexandre Arcady	Chazel & Jugnot	1979	1,387,034
69	Nuit d'ivresse	Bernard Nauer	Balasko, Lhermitte & Jugnot	1986	1,381,464
70	Absolutely Fabulous	Gabriel Aghion	Balasko	2001	1,370,394
71	Le prix à payer	Alexandra Leclère	Clavier	2007	1,368,791
72	Twist again à Moscou	Jean-Marie Poiré (9)	Clavier	1986	1,361,683
73	Le quart d'heure américain	Philippe Galland (2)	Jugnot	1982	1,337,893
74	Paris 36	Christophe Barratier (3)	Jugnot	2008	1,331,585
75	Promotion canapé	Didier Kaminka	Lhermitte	1990	1,324,814
76	Pour cent briques, t'as plus rien...	Édouard Molinaro	Jugnot	1982	1,303,784
77	On aura tout vu	Georges Lautner (2)	Jugnot, Blanc & Chazel	1976	1,290,565
78	The Toy	Francis Veber (3)	Jugnot	1976	1,249,452
79	La gitane	Philippe de Broca	Chazel	1986	1,248,434
80	Just Visiting	Jean-Marie Poiré (10)	Clavier	2001	1,217,623
81	Boudu	Gérard Jugnot (5)	Jugnot	2005	1,199,369
82	Ma femme s'appelle reviens	Patrice Leconte (5)	Blanc	1982	1,188,840
83	Most Promising Young Actress	Gérard Jugnot (6)	Jugnot & Lhermitte	2000	1,184,971
84	My Life Is Hell	Josiane Balasko (2)	Balasko	1991	1,170,523
85	Un été d'enfer	Michael Schock	Lhermitte	1984	1,138,383
86	The Roommates Party	Alexandra Leclère (2)	Balasko	2015	1,131,775
87	Let Joy Reign Supreme	Bertrand Tavernier	Blanc, Clavier, Lhermitte & Jugnot	1975	1,124,845
88	Mauvais esprit	Patrick Alessandrin	Lhermitte	2003	1,106,439
89	Merci la vie	Bertrand Blier (5)	Blanc	1991	1,088,777
90	Circulez y'a rien à voir	Patrice Leconte (6)	Blanc	1983	1,084,439
91	Signes extérieurs de richesse	Jacques Monnet	Balasko	1983	1,074,802
92	Lady Cops	Josiane Balasko (3)	Balasko	1987	1,071,467
93	Je vais craquer !!!	François Leterrier	Clavier	1980	1,053,217
94	Effroyables jardins	Jean Becker (2)	Lhermitte	2003	1,035,142
95	Memories	Jean-Paul Rouve	Blanc	2014	1,034,505
96	Le prince du Pacifique	Alain Corneau	Lhermitte	2000	1,028,640
97	Fanfan	Alexandre Jardin	Lhermitte	1993	1,020,679
98	Casque bleu	Gérard Jugnot (7)	Jugnot	1994	1,015,156
99	Do Not Disturb	Patrice Leconte (7)	Clavier	2014	1,006,867
100	La Gueule de l'autre	Pierre Tchernia	Blanc	1979	1,000,704

- Christian Clavier play in 25 movies over a million of entries. The films in which he played has sold 122 167 881 ticket.
- Thierry Lhermitte play in 29 movies over a million of entries. The films in which he played has sold 109 850 038 ticket.
- Gérard Jugnot play in 33 movies over a million of entries. The films in which he played has sold 105 415 238 ticket.
- Josiane Balasko play in 26 movies over a million of entries. The films in which she played has sold 78 534 082 ticket.
- Michel Blanc play in 21 movies over a million of entries. The films in which he played has sold 69 400 706 ticket.
- Marie-Anne Chazel play in 16 movies over a million of entries. The films in which she played has sold 60 138 655 ticket.

== Awards ==
=== Cannes Film Festival ===
Year	Category	Recipient	Film	Result
1986	Best Actor Award	Michel Blanc	Tenue de soirée	Won
1994	Palme d'Or	Michel Blanc	Dead Tired	Nominated
1994	Best Screenplay Award	Michel Blanc	Dead Tired	Won

=== César Award ===
Year	Category	Recipient	Film	Result
1985	César Award for Best First Feature Film	Michel Blanc	Marche à l'ombre	Nominated
1987	César Award for Best Actor	Michel Blanc	Tenue de soirée	Nominated
1988	César Award for Best Actor	Gérard Jugnot	Tandem	Nominated
1990	César Award for Best Actor	Michel Blanc	Monsieur Hire	Nominated
1990	César Award for Best Actress	Josiane Balasko	Too Beautiful for You	Nominated
1992	César Award for Best Actor	Gérard Jugnot	Une époque formidable...	Nominated
1994	César Award for Best Actor	Christian Clavier	Les Visiteurs	Nominated
1994	César Award for Best Original Screenplay or Adaptation	Christian Clavier	Les Visiteurs	Nominated
1994	César Award for Best Actress	Josiane Balasko	Not Everybody's Lucky Enough to Have Communist Parents	Nominated
1995	César Award for Best Original Screenplay or Adaptation	Michel Blanc	Dead Tired	Nominated
1996	César Award for Best Original Screenplay or Adaptation	Josiane Balasko	French Twist	Won
1996	César Award for Best Film	Josiane Balasko	French Twist	Nominated
1996	César Award for Best Director	Josiane Balasko	French Twist	Nominated
1998	César Award for Best Supporting Actor	Gérard Jugnot	Marthe	Nominated
2000	Honorary César	Josiane Balasko	—N/a	Won
2003	César Award for Best Original Screenplay or Adaptation	Michel Blanc	Summer Things	Nominated
2004	César Award for Best Actress	Josiane Balasko	That Woman	Nominated
2005	César Award for Best Actor	Gérard Jugnot	The Chorus	Nominated
2007	César Award for Best Actor	Michel Blanc	Je vous trouve très beau	Nominated
2008	César Award for Best Actor	Michel Blanc	The Witnesses	Nominated
2012	César Award for Best Supporting Actor	Michel Blanc	The Minister	Won

Thierry Lhermitte and Marie-Anne Chazel have never been nominated for a César Award. Josiane Balasko is the most awarded with 2 César and Michel Blanc, the most nominated with 8 nomination.

=== European Film Awards ===
Year	Category	Recipient	Film	Result
2004	European Film Award for Best Actor	Gérard Jugnot	The Chorus	Nominated

=== Golden Globe Awards ===
Year	Category	Recipient	Film	Result
1995	Golden Globe Award for Best Foreign Language Film	Josiane Balasko	French Twist	Nominated

=== Lumière Awards ===
Year	Category	Recipient	Film	Result
1996	Lumière Award for Best Screenplay	Josiane Balasko	French Twist	Won
2007	Lumière Award for Best Actor	Michel Blanc	Je vous trouve très beau	Nominated
2014	Lumière Award for Best Actor	Thierry Lhermitte	The French Minister	Nominated
