= Thierry Lhermitte =

French actor, director, writer and producer (born 1952)

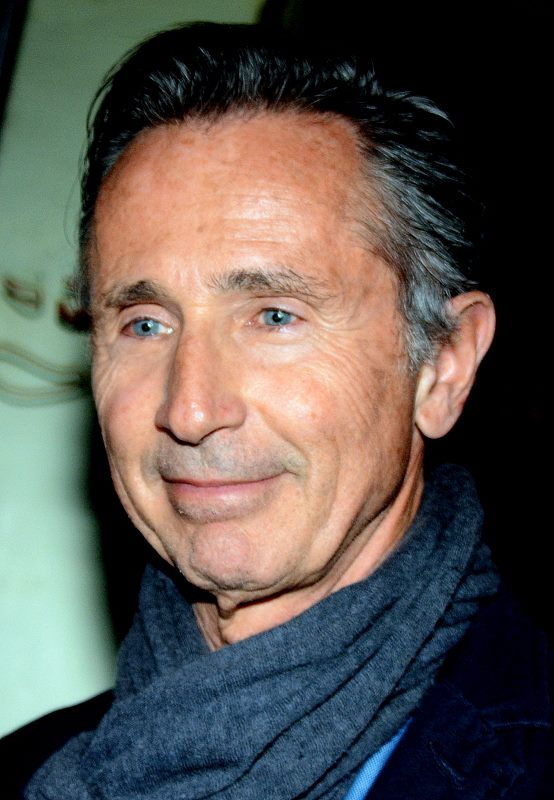
- Lhermitte in 2015
- Born: Thierry Michel Lhermitte; 24 November 1952 (age 73); Boulogne-Billancourt, France
- Occupations: Actor, director, writer, producer
- Years active: 1973–present

Thierry Michel Lhermitte (French pronunciation: [tjɛʁi lɛʁˈmit]; born 24 November 1952) is a French actor, director, writer and producer, best known for his comedic roles. He was a founder of the comedy troupe Le Splendid in the 1970s, along with, among others, Christian Clavier, Gérard Jugnot, and Michel Blanc. The group adapted a number of its stage hits for the cinema, and scored major successes with films such as Les Bronzés (1978), Les Bronzés font du ski (1979), Le Père Noël est une ordure (1982) and Un indien dans la ville (1994).

== Honours and awards ==
In 1981, he received the Prix Jean Gabin. He was made Chevalier of the Légion d'honneur in 2001. He was made Officier of the Ordre national du Mérite in 2005.

== Filmography ==
=== Actor ===
| Year | Title | Role | Director | Notes |
|---|---|---|---|---|
| 1973 | L'An 01 | | Jacques Doillon | |
| 1974 | Going Places | Doorman | Bertrand Blier | |
| 1974 | Les suspects | A photographer | Michel Wyn | |
| 1975 | C'est pas parce qu'on a rien à dire qu'il faut fermer sa gueule... | The young soldier | Jacques Besnard | |
| 1975 | Let Joy Reign Supreme | Count of Horn | Bertrand Tavernier | |
| 1975 | Le bol d'air | Thierry | Charles Nemes | Short |
| 1976 | Attention les yeux! | A cop | Gérard Pirès | |
| 1976 | F comme Fairbanks | The young executive | Maurice Dugowson | |
| 1977 | Le diable dans la boîte | | Pierre Lary | |
| 1977 | L'amour en herbe | François Josse | Roger Andrieux | |
| 1977 | Spoiled Children | Stéphane Lecouvette | Bertrand Tavernier | |
| 1977 | Vous n'aurez pas l'Alsace et la Lorraine | The Chief Herald | Coluche | |
| 1978 | Le dernier amant romantique | L'Hermitte | Just Jaeckin | |
| 1978 | Si vous n'aimez pas ça, n'en dégoûtez pas les autres | A spectator | Raymond Lewin | |
| 1978 | Les Bronzés | Popeye | Patrice Leconte | |
| 1979 | Heroes Are Not Wet Behind the Ears | The tire's thief | Charles Nemes | |
| 1979 | Les Bronzés font du ski | Popeye | Patrice Leconte | |
| 1980 | Alors heureux? | Richard | Claude Barrois | |
| 1980 | Tout dépend des filles... | Charles-Hubert | Pierre Fabre | |
| 1980 | Caméra une première | The tenant | Jean-Pierre Prévost | TV series (1 Episode) |
| 1980 | The Lady Banker | Devoluy | Francis Girod | |
| 1981 | Clara et les Chics Types | Bertrand | Jacques Monnet | |
| 1981 | L'année prochaine... si tout va bien | Maxime | Jean-Loup Hubert | |
| 1981 | Les hommes préfèrent les grosses | Hervé | Jean-Marie Poiré | |
| 1982 | Le voyageur imprudent | Pierre Saint-Menoux | Pierre Tchernia | TV movie |
| 1982 | Au théâtre ce soir | Paul Bratteur | Pierre Sabbagh | TV series (1 Episode) |
| 1982 | Elle voit des nains partout! | The traveler prince | Jean-Claude Sussfeld | |
| 1982 | Le Père Noël est une ordure | Pierre Mortez | Jean-Marie Poiré | |
| 1982 | Légitime violence | Edouard Kasler | Serge Leroy | |
| 1982 | La tribu des vieux enfants | Louis | Michel Favart | TV movie |
| 1983 | Un homme à ma taille | Georges | Annette Carducci | |
| 1983 | Rock 'n Torah | Pierre | Marc-André Grynbaum | |
| 1983 | L'indic | Dominique | Serge Leroy | |
| 1983 | Stella | Yvon | Laurent Heynemann | |
| 1983 | My Best Friend's Girl | Pascal | Bertrand Blier | |
| 1983 | The Bride Who Came In from the Cold | Paul | Charles Nemes | |
| 1983 | Papy fait de la résistance | The SS Colonel | Jean-Marie Poiré | |
| 1984 | La smala | The cop | Jean-Loup Hubert | |
| 1984 | My New Partner | François Lesbuche | Claude Zidi | |
| 1984 | Until September | Xavier de la Perouse | Richard Marquand | |
| 1984 | Un été d'enfer | Philippe Darlan | Michael Schock | |
| 1985 | Le père Noël est une ordure | Pierre | Philippe Galland | TV movie |
| 1985 | Les Rois du gag | François Leroux | Claude Zidi | |
| 1985 | Le mariage du siècle | Paul | Philippe Galland | |
| 1986 | Nuit d'ivresse | Jacques Belin | Bernard Nauer | |
| 1987 | Dernier été à Tanger | Richard Corrigan | Alexandre Arcady | |
| 1987 | Fucking Fernand | Fernand | Gérard Mordillat | |
| 1988 | Sueurs froides | Charles Vétheuil | Hervé Palud | TV series (1 Episode) |
| 1990 | My New Partner II | François Lesbuche | Claude Zidi | |
| 1990 | L'ex-femme de ma vie | Tom | Josée Dayan | TV movie |
| 1990 | La fête des pères | Thomas Bastide | Joy Fleury | |
| 1990 | 1001 Nights | The King | Philippe de Broca | |
| 1990 | Promotion canapé | The Minister | Didier Kaminka | |
| 1991 | Speaking of the Devil | Victor | Enzo Barboni | |
| 1991 | Les secrets professionnels du Dr Apfelglück | Doctor Apfelglück | | Also director, writer and producer |
| 1991 | La Totale! | François Voisin | Claude Zidi | |
| 1992 | Les danseurs du Mozambique | Pierre | Philippe Lefebvre | TV movie |
| 1992 | Le zèbre | Hippolyte Pecheral | Jean Poiret | |
| 1993 | Tango | Paul | Patrice Leconte | |
| 1993 | Fanfan | | Alexandre Jardin | |
| 1993 | L'ombre du doute | Alexandrine's Lawyer | Aline Issermann | |
| 1993 | Deux justiciers dans la ville | Arnold | | TV series (1 Episode) |
| 1993 | L'honneur de la tribu | The French Lieutenant | Mahmoud Zemmouri | |
| 1994 | La Vengeance d'une blonde | Gilles Favier | Jeannot Szwarc | |
| 1994 | Elles n'oublient jamais | Julien | Christopher Frank | |
| 1994 | Grosse Fatigue | Himself | Michel Blanc | |
| 1994 | Seven Sundays | Dodo | Jean-Charles Tacchella | |
| 1994 | Un indien dans la ville | Stephen | Hervé Palud | |
| 1995 | Augustin | Himself | Anne Fontaine | |
| 1996 | Ma femme me quitte | Pavel Kovacks | Didier Kaminka | |
| 1996 | Fallait pas!... | Doctor Simson | Gérard Jugnot | |
| 1997 | Les Soeurs Soleil | Brice d'Hachicourt | Jeannot Szwarc | |
| 1997 | Kings for a Day | The producer | François Velle | |
| 1997 | Quatre garçons pleins d'avenir | The cop | Jean-Paul Lilienfeld | |
| 1997 | Marquise | Louis XIV | Véra Belmont | |
| 1997 | An American Werewolf in Paris | Dr. Thierry Pigot | Anthony Waller | |
| 1998 | Le Dîner de Cons | Pierre Brochant | Francis Veber | |
| 1998 | Charité biz'ness | Photographer | Thierry Barthes & Pierre Jamin | |
| 1999 | Les collègues | The player | Philippe Dajoux | |
| 1999 | Trafic d'influence | Maxime de Labardière | Dominique Farrugia | |
| 1999 | Le plus beau pays du monde | Colonel Valogne | Marcel Bluwal | |
| 1999 | C'est pas ma faute! | Pierre Michaud | Jacques Monnet | |
| 2000 | Le prof | The rector | Alexandre Jardin | |
| 2000 | Most Promising Young Actress | An actor | Gérard Jugnot | |
| 2000 | Deuxième vie | Forsan | Patrick Braoudé | |
| 2000 | Le prince du Pacifique | Alfred de Morsac | Alain Corneau | |
| 2000 | Bon plan | Knut | Jérôme Lévy | |
| 2001 | The Closet | Guillaume | Francis Veber | |
| 2001 | Le roman de Lulu | Roman | Pierre-Olivier Scotto | |
| 2002 | A Private Affair | François Manéri | Guillaume Nicloux | |
| 2002 | Il giovane Casanova | Bernis | Giacomo Battiato | TV movie |
| 2002 | La bande du drugstore | Charlotte's father | François Armanet | |
| 2002 | And Now... Ladies and Gentlemen | Thierry | Claude Lelouch | |
| 2003 | Le Divorce | Edgar Cosset | James Ivory | |
| 2003 | That Woman | François Manéri | Guillaume Nicloux | |
| 2003 | Effroyables jardins | Thierry Plaisance | Jean Becker | |
| 2003 | Snowboarder | Popeye | Olias Barco | |
| 2003 | Entrusted | Andreas Lazik | Giacomo Battiato | TV movie |
| 2003 | Qui perd gagne! | Jacques Loriot | Laurent Bénégui | |
| 2003 | Mauvais esprit | Vincent Porel | Patrick Alessandrin | |
| 2003 | Ripoux 3 | François Lesbuche | Claude Zidi | |
| 2003 | The Car Keys | Himself | Laurent Baffie | |
| 2004 | L'enfant de l'aube | Jean | Marc Angelo | TV movie |
| 2004 | L'américain | Eddy | Patrick Timsit | |
| 2004 | Au secours, j'ai 30 ans! | Himself | Marie-Anne Chazel | |
| 2004 | Si j'étais elle | Didier | Stéphane Clavier | TV movie |
| 2004 | Entre vivir y soñar | Pierre | Alfonso Albacete & David Menkes | |
| 2005 | L'Antidote | Doctor Morny | Vincent De Brus | |
| 2005 | Foon | Bob | Benoît Pétré, Isabelle Vitari, ... | |
| 2005 | L'Ex-femme de ma vie | Tom | Josiane Balasko | |
| 2006 | Les Bronzés 3: Amis pour la vie | Popeye | Patrice Leconte | |
| 2006 | Incontrôlable | Denis | Raffy Shart | |
| 2006 | Mr. Average | President Chastain | Pierre-Paul Renders | |
| 2007 | La clef | François Manéri | Guillaume Nicloux | |
| 2007 | 13 m^{2} | Solitary | Barthélémy Grossmann | |
| 2007 | L'invité | Alexandre | Laurent Bouhnik | |
| 2008 | Ça se soigne? | Tom Bledish | Laurent Chouchan | |
| 2008 | Notre univers impitoyable | Master Nicolas Bervesier | Léa Fazer | |
| 2009 | Sans rancune! | Vapeur | Yves Hanchar | |
| 2009 | Park Benches | The medecin | Bruno Podalydès | |
| 2009 | Le siffleur | Jean-Patrick Zapetti | Philippe Lefebvre | |
| 2010 | Biographie sans Antoinette | | Roberto Maria Grassi | TV movie |
| 2010 | Thelma, Louise et Chantal | Philippe | Benoît Pétré | |
| 2010 | Le grand restaurant | A client | Gérard Pullicino | TV movie |
| 2010 | Le pigeon | Hubert Dorante | Lorenzo Gabriele | TV movie |
| 2010 | Gigola | Monsieur Henry | Laure Charpentier | |
| 2011–15 | Doc Martin | Doctor Martin Le Foll | Jean-Michel Fages, Stéphane Kappes, Jean-Pierre Sinapi, ... | TV series (26 Episodes) |
| 2012 | Les papas du dimanche | Morgan | Louis Becker | |
| 2012 | L'affaire Gordji, histoire d'une cohabitation | Jacques Chirac | Guillaume Nicloux | TV movie |
| 2012 | Le noir (te) vous va si bien | François | Jacques Bral | |
| 2012 | Nothing Sacred | Mayor of Paris | Dylan Ban & Morgan Pehme | |
| 2013 | La marque des anges - Miserere | Vernoux | Sylvain White | |
| 2013 | The French Minister | Alexandre Taillard de Worms | Bertrand Tavernier | Nominated - Lumière Award for Best Actor |
| 2014 | Benoît Brisefer : Les Taxis rouges | Arsène Duval | Manuel Pradal | |
| 2014 | Witnesses | Paul Maisonneuve | Hervé Hadmar & M Pink Christofalo | TV series (6 Episodes) |
| 2015 | Nos femmes | Simon | Richard Berry | |
| 2015 | Nothing Sacred | Mayor of Paris | Dylan Bank & Morgan Pehme | |
| 2016 | Ma famille t'adore déjà | Jean | Jérôme Commandeur & Alan Corno | |
| 2016 | The New Life of Paul Sneijder | Paul Sneijder | Thomas Vincent | |
| 2017 | Le Syndrome de l'Ecossais | Bruno | Jean-Louis Benoit | TV movie |
| 2017 | Scènes de ménages: enfin à la montagne | | Francis Duquet | TV movie |
| 2018 | La finale | Roland Verdi | Robin Sykes | |
| 2019 | All Inclusive | | Fabien Onteniente | |
| 2025 | Asterix and Obelix: The Big Fight | Getafix (voice) | Alain Chabat | TV miniseries |
| 2026 | De Gaulle | Antonin Baudry | Henri Giraud | Part 2 (J'écris ton nom) only |

== Selected writing credits ==
- 2006: Les Bronzés 3: Amis pour la vie
- 2000: Le prince du Pacifique
- 1999: It's Not My Fault! (adaptation and dialogue)
- 1997: Jungle 2 Jungle (earlier screenplay Un indien dans la ville)
- 1994: Un indien dans la ville (adaptation)
- 1991: Les secrets professionnels du Dr Apfelglück
- 1986: Nuit d'ivresse
- 1982: Le père Noël est une ordure
- 1979: Les bronzés font du ski (as L'équipe du Splendid)
- 1975: Le bol d'air (short as Le Splendid)
- 1975: C'est pas parce qu'on a rien à dire qu'il faut fermer sa gueule... (original idea)
- 1974: Bonne présentation exigée (short)
