= René Pétillon =

French cartoonist and comics artist (1945–2018)

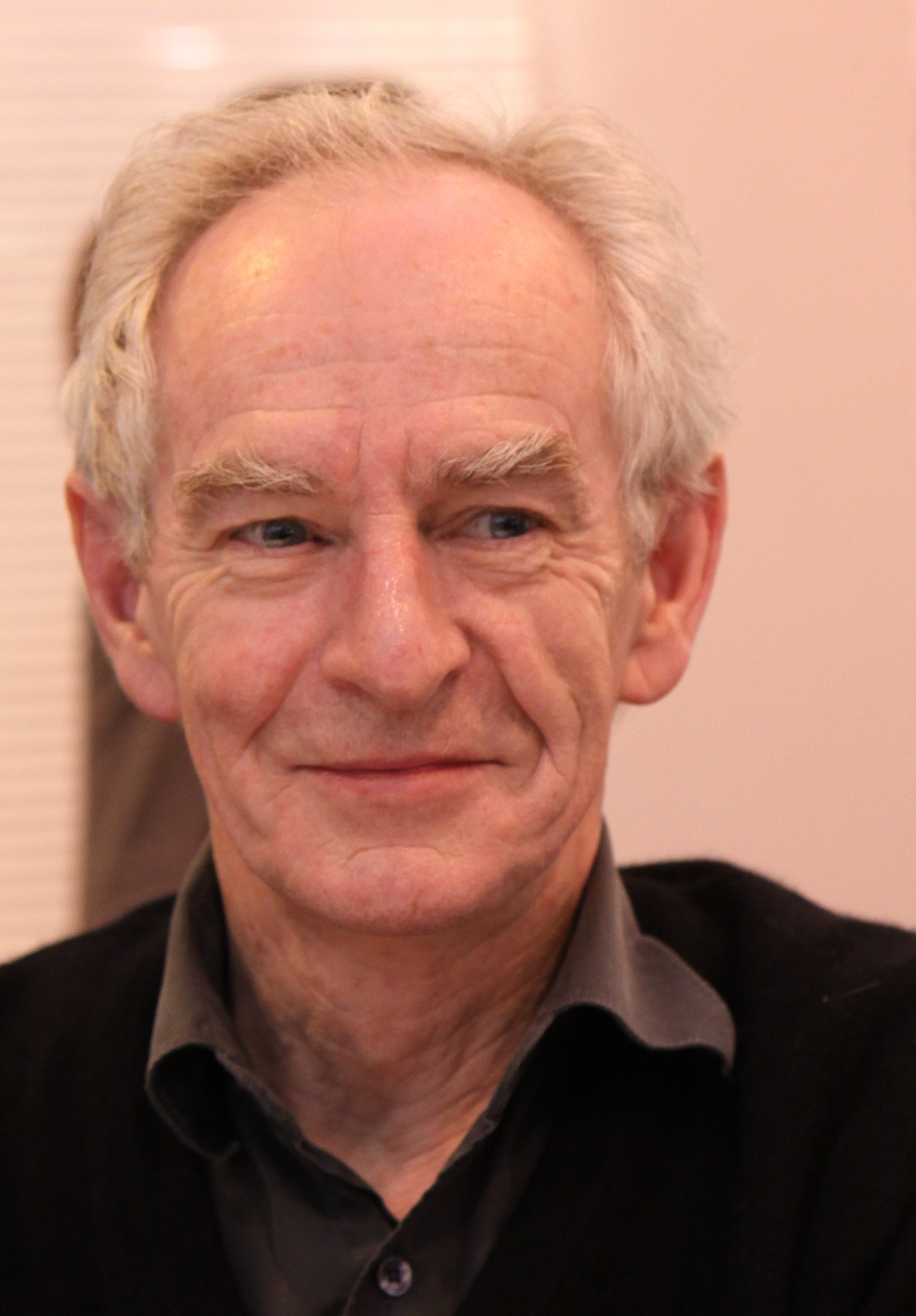
René Petillon at the Salon du livre de Paris, 2010

After the government suggested an amnesty for tax evaders having sent their capital abroad, a businessman reacts: Repatriating my capital? And then what? My factories? Le Canard enchaîné, 4 August 2004.

René Pétillon (French: [petijɔ̃]; 12 December 1945 – 30 September 2018) was a French satirical and political cartoonist and comics artist born in Lesneven. As a cartoonist, he was most famous for his work in Canard Enchaîné. As a comics artist, his best-known and longest-running series was the humorous comic strip Jack Palmer, about a goofy private detective.

Pétillon joined Pilote magazine in 1972. From 1993, he published cartoons in the Canard Enchaîné and he signed them as Pétillon.

In 1989, he was awarded the Grand Prix de la ville at the Angoulême International Comics Festival. In 2002 he get the Grand prix de l'humour vache at the Salon international du dessin de presse et d'humour in Saint-Just-le-Martel.

In 2001, he published L'Enquête Corse ("The Corsican Enquiry"), dealing with the "independentist" groups in Corsica. The album was a popular and critical success, with 300,000 printed in French plus 30,000 in Corsican. A movie of the same name, starring Jean Reno, was based on the book and released in 2004.

His work appeared in L'Écho des Savanes too and in 2015 he also published in Charlie Hebdo.

He died in Paris in 2018 after a long illness.
