= Michel Blanc =

French actor, writer and director (1952–2024)

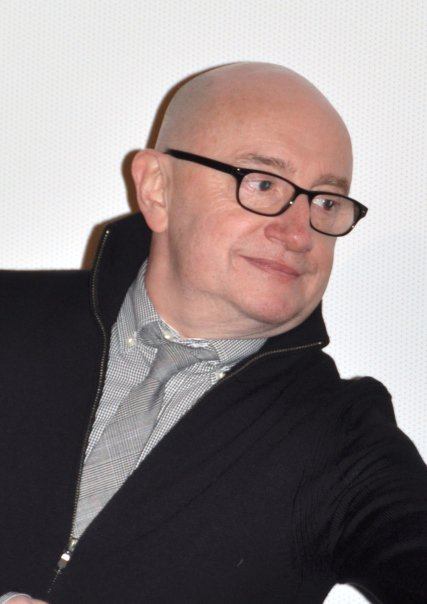
- Blanc in 2009
- Born: Michel Jean François Blanc; 16 April 1952; Courbevoie, France
- Died: 3 October 2024 (aged 72); Paris, France
- Occupations: Actor; director; writer
- Years active: 1974–2024

Michel Blanc (French: [miʃɛl blɑ̃]; 16 April 1952 – 3 October 2024) was a French actor, writer and director. He is noted for his roles of losers and hypochondriacs. He is frequently associated with Le Splendid, which he co-founded, along with Thierry Lhermitte, Josiane Balasko, Christian Clavier, Marie-Anne Chazel and Gérard Jugnot. He also appeared in more serious roles, such as the title role in the Patrice Leconte film Monsieur Hire.

== Life and career ==
Michel Blanc came from a modest family background; being the only son of Marcel, a removals man and Jeanine Blanc, a typist. His parents cosseted him when it was discovered shortly after birth that he had a heart murmur. He attended the Lycée Pasteur in Neuilly-sur-Seine, where he met Gérard Jugnot and the two became friends and later professional colleagues. He also met Marie-Anne Chazel, Christian Clavier, Thierry Lhermitte and Josiane Balasko in those school years, the group later becoming the Le splendid troupe.

Blanc's breakthrough role was in Les Bronzés, a 1978 comedy about French holidaymakers seeking romance at a resort in Côte d'Ivoire. Blanc's character, Jean-Claude Dusse, an awkward bachelor who just cannot manage to seduce women. Blanc feared, after two Les Bronzés sequels, that he might become typecast as "a lovable deadbeat". Blanc extended his range with serious film roles (such as in the films of André Téchiné), theatre work, screen-writing (from Les Bronzés to Un petit boulot in 2016) and film direction (Grosse Fatigue in 1994, Mauvaise Passe filmed in London in 1999, Embrassez qui vous voudrez in 2002 and Voyez comme on danse in 2018). He declined to direct Une petite zone de turbulences in 2009 while nonetheless preparing the screenplay and starring. Blanc began his directing career with the comedy Marche à l'ombre, starring alongside Gérard Lanvin in 1984. The sharp dialogue and the contrast between the main duo assured the film a great success that year with over 6 million cinema entries.

Blanc commented in 2010 "I'm very wary about forming habits when it comes to film-making, and art in general". In terms of his working methods as a writer, in adaptating a novel or text for a screen play he was wary of losing the original style, and he hated snipping scenes he liked. "So I always work the same way. I write. Then I leave it alone three weeks before reworking it. At that point, it's no longer the book I'm adapting, but my script. For A Spot of Bother I wrote five different versions, then Alfred worked on my final version to make his shooting script."

Michel Blanc translated and adapted several English-language plays for the French stage, such as Je veux faire du cinéma in 1992 (I ought to be in pictures) by Neil Simon, Temps variable en soirée in 1996 (Communicating Doors) after Alan Ayckbourn, Espèces menacées in 1997 (Funny money) by Ray Cooney, La Chambre bleue in 1999 (The Blue Room, after La Ronde) by David Hare, La Valse à Manhattan in 2001 (The West Side Waltz) by Ernest Thompson, L'amour est enfant de salaud in 2003 (Things we do for love) by Alan Ayckbourn, Frankie et Johnny au clair de lune in 2004 (Frankie and Johnny in the Clair de Lune) after Terrence McNally and Tantine et moi in 2005 (Vigil, aka Auntie and Me) after Morris Panych.

A devotee of classical music since childhood, in 2004 he gave the premiere of the monodrama for speaker and orchestra by Eric Tanguy, Sénèque, dernier jour in Paris with the Orchestre National de Bretagne. Blanc also wrote the text for Tanguy's theatrical work, Photo d'un enfant avec une trompette, for the Théâtre des Bouffes du Nord, which had its premiere during the theatre's 2013–2014 season.

As an actor he was sometimes dubbed a "sad clown" in the press, but he said this missed the mark. He told the French media and culture periodical Télérama "I'm not a sad clown at all, I'm a worried clown".

Blanc is one of a few people to have won awards at the Cannes Film Festival in both a creative and performing role, winning the Male Acting Prize in 1986 for Antoine in Tenue de Soirée, and the Best Screenplay Prize for Grosse Fatigue in 1994.

Blanc died of cardiac arrest, during a medical examination, at Saint-Antoine Hospital, Paris, on 3 October 2024, at the age of 72.

== Theater ==
=== As an actor ===
| Year | Title | Director | Notes |
|---|---|---|---|
| 1976 | Foot-ball | Michel Fagadau | |
| 1976 | Je vais craquer | Le Splendid | Théâtre du Splendid |
| 1976 | Ma tête est malade | Le Splendid | Théâtre du Splendid |
| 1977 | Le Pot de terre contre le pot de vin | Le Splendid | Théâtre du Splendid |
| 1978 | Amour, coquillages et crustacés | Le Splendid | Théâtre du Splendid |
| 1982 | Bunny's bar | Josiane Balasko | Théâtre du Splendid |
| 1985–88 | Nuit d'ivresse | Josiane Balasko | Théâtre du Splendid |
| 1992 | Je veux faire du cinéma | Michel Blanc | Théâtre de la Michodière |
| 1992 | 'Art' | Patrice Kerbrat | Théâtre des Champs-Élysées |
| 1995 | The Merchant of Venice | Jean-Luc Tardieu | Maison de la culture de Loire-Atlantique Nantes |

=== As a director ===
| Year | Title | Comedian | Notes |
|---|---|---|---|
| 1987 | L'Excès contraire | Dominique Lavanant | Théâtre des Bouffes-Parisiens written by Françoise Sagan |
| 1992 | Je veux faire du cinéma | Michel Blanc | Théâtre de la Michodière written by Neil Simon |

== Filmography ==
=== As an actor ===
==== Cinema ====
| Year | Title | Role | Director | Notes |
|---|---|---|---|---|
| 1974 | Les filles de Malemort | | Daniel Daërt | |
| 1974 | Bonne présentation exigée | The man who arrived | Charles Nemes | Short |
| 1975 | Let Joy Reign Supreme | Louis XV's valet | Bertrand Tavernier | |
| 1975 | Le bol d'air | Michel | Charles Nemes | Short |
| 1976 | The Tenant | Scope's Neighbor | Roman Polanski | |
| 1976 | On aura tout vu | A man at the theater | Georges Lautner | |
| 1976 | Attention les yeux! | A Cop | Gérard Pirès | |
| 1976 | The Best Way to Walk | Raoul Deloux | Claude Miller | |
| 1976 | Je t'aime moi non plus | A worker | Serge Gainsbourg | |
| 1976 | L'ordinateur des pompes funèbres | Choukroun | Gérard Pirès | |
| 1977 | Spoiled Children | The young man | Bertrand Tavernier | |
| 1977 | Le point de mire | The cop | Jean-Claude Tramont | |
| 1977 | Le diable dans la boîte | | Pierre Lary | |
| 1977 | Vous n'aurez pas l'Alsace et la Lorraine | Antremont | Coluche | |
| 1978 | Surprise Sock | The intern | Jean-François Davy | |
| 1978 | La tortue sur le dos | The reveller | Luc Béraud | |
| 1978 | French Fried Vacation | Jean-Claude Dusse | Patrice Leconte | |
| 1978 | Le beaujolais nouveau est arrivé | The Captain's son | Jean-Luc Voulfow | |
| 1979 | The Adolescent | M. Bertin | Jeanne Moreau | |
| 1979 | Rien ne va plus | Marcel Dupin | Jean-Michel Ribes | |
| 1979 | La Gueule de l'autre | Taboureau | Pierre Tchernia | |
| 1979 | French Fried Vacation 2 | Jean-Claude Dusse | Patrice Leconte | |
| 1979 | Cause toujours... tu m'intéresses! | The cop | Édouard Molinaro | |
| 1979 | Heroes Are Not Wet Behind the Ears | A passerby | Charles Nemes | |
| 1980 | The Horse of Pride | Corentin Calvez | Claude Chabrol | |
| 1981 | Viens chez moi, j'habite chez une copine | Guy | Patrice Leconte | |
| 1982 | Santa Claus is a Stinker | The obscene crank caller | Jean-Marie Poiré | |
| 1982 | Ma femme s'appelle reviens | Bernard Fizet | Patrice Leconte | |
| 1983 | Circulez y'a rien à voir | Inspector Leroux | Patrice Leconte | |
| 1983 | Gramps Is in the Resistance | Father Leboeuf | Jean-Marie Poiré | |
| 1984 | Nemo | Boris | Arnaud Sélignac | |
| 1984 | Marche à l'ombre | Denis | Michel Blanc | |
| 1984 | Retenez Moi...Ou Je Fais Un Malheur | Laurent Martin | Michel Gérard | |
| 1985 | Drôle de samedi | The learner driver | Bay Okan | |
| 1986 | Les Fugitifs | Doctor Bourdarias | Francis Veber | |
| 1986 | Evening Dress | Antoine | Bertrand Blier | Cannes Film Festival – Best Actor; Nominated – César Award for Best Actor |
| 1986 | Je hais les acteurs | Monsieur Albert | Gérard Krawczyk | |
| 1988 | Without Fear or Blame | Verdiglione | Gérard Jugnot | |
| 1988 | Une nuit à l'Assemblée Nationale | Walter Arbeit | Jean-Pierre Mocky | |
| 1989 | Monsieur Hire | Monsieur Hire | Patrice Leconte | Nominated – César Award for Best Actor |
| 1989 | Chambre à part | Martin | Jacky Cukier | |
| 1990 | Uranus | René Gaigneux | Claude Berri | |
| 1990 | Strike It Rich | Hotel Manager | James Scott | |
| 1991 | Merci la vie | Raymond Pelleveau | Bertrand Blier | |
| 1991 | Prospero's Books | Alonso | Peter Greenaway | |
| 1991 | The Professional Secrets of Dr. Apfelgluck | The Hindu | Alessandro Capone, ... | |
| 1992 | The Favour, the Watch and the Very Big Fish | Norbert | Ben Lewin | |
| 1993 | Toxic Affair | The suicidal | Philomène Esposito | |
| 1994 | Dead Tired | Himself / Patrick Olivier | Michel Blanc | |
| 1994 | The Monster | Paride Taccone | Roberto Benigni | |
| 1994 | Prêt-à-Porter | Inspector Forget | Robert Altman | |
| 1996 | Les Grands Ducs | Shapiron | Patrice Leconte | |
| 1999 | C'est plus fort que moi | | Gilles Marchand | Short |
| 2002 | Summer Things | Jean-Pierre | Michel Blanc | |
| 2004 | Madame Édouard | Inspector Léon | Nadine Monfils | |
| 2006 | You Are So Beautiful | Aymé Pigrenet | Isabelle Mergault | Nominated – César Award for Best Actor; Nominated – Lumière Award for Best Actor |
| 2006 | French Fried Vacation 3 | Jean-Claude Dusse | Patrice Leconte | |
| 2007 | The Witnesses | Adrien | André Téchiné | Nominated – César Award for Best Actor |
| 2007 | The Second Wind | Inspector Blot | Alain Corneau | |
| 2008 | Nos 18 ans | Professor Martineau | Frédéric Berthe | |
| 2008 | A Day at the Museum | Mosk | Jean-Michel Ribes | |
| 2009 | The Girl on the Train | Samuel Bleistein | André Téchiné | |
| 2010 | A Spot of Bother | Jean-Paul Muret | Alfred Lot | |
| 2011 | The Minister | Gilles | Pierre Schoeller | César Award for Best Supporting Actor |
| 2011 | The Day I Saw Your Heart | Eli Dhrey | Jennifer Devoldère | |
| 2013 | Demi-soeur | Paul Bérard | Josiane Balasko | |
| 2014 | The Hundred-Foot Journey | Mayor | Lasse Hallström | |
| 2015 | Memories | Michel | Jean-Paul Rouve | |
| 2015 | The New Adventures of Aladdin | Sultan | Arthur Benzaquen | |
| 2016 | Odd Job | Gardot | Pascal Chaumeil | |
| 2017 | Raid dingue | Jacques Pasquali | Dany Boon | |
| 2018 | Voyez comme on danse | Jean-Pierre | Michel Blanc | |
| 2019 | A Good Doctor | Serge Mamou-Mani | Tristan Séguéla | |
| 2021 | Les Tuche 4 | Jean-Yves Marteau | Olivier Baroux | |
| 2023 | Les cadors | Jean-Pierre Deloup | Julien Guetta | |
| 2023 | Les petites victoires | Emile Menoux | Mélanie Auffret | |
| 2023 | Marie-Line et son juge | Gilles d'Outremont | Jean-Pierre Améris | |
| 2025 | The Safe House | Père-Grand | Lionel Baier | |
| TBA | Le routard | Charoux | Julien Hervé & Philippe Mechelen | Post-Production |

==== Television ====
| Year | Title | Role | Director | Notes |
|---|---|---|---|---|
| 1977 | Au théâtre ce soir | Sandy Remington | Pierre Sabbagh | TV series (1 episode) |
| 1978 | Les héritiers | Ivan Chaulard | Pierre Lary | TV series (1 episode) |
| 1978 | Madame le juge | Colomar | Philippe Condroyer | TV series (1 episode) |
| 1978 | Le temps d'une République | The second officer | Michel Wyn | TV series (1 episode) |
| 1979 | Pierrot mon ami | | François Leterrier | TV movie |
| 1979 | Les 400 coups de Virginie | The antiquarian | Bernard Queysanne | TV mini-series |
| 1979 | Histoires insolites | Inspector | Maurice Ronet | TV series (1 episode) |
| 1979 | Les enquêtes du commissaire Maigret | Crotton | Yves Allégret | TV series (1 episode) |
| 1981 | Histoire contemporaine | Ernest de Bonmont | Michel Boisrond | TV mini-series |
| 1981 | Les enquêtes du commissaire Maigret | Belloir | Yves Allégret | TV series (1 episode) |
| 1982 | Le mystère du gala maudit | | Bernard Lion | TV movie |
| 1982 | Les enfants du rock | A classmate | Jean-Noël Roy | TV series (1 episode) |
| 1983 | Après tout ce qu'on a fait pour toi | Pierre | Jacques Fansten | TV movie |
| 1983 | Merci Bernard | Various | Jean-Michel Ribes | TV series (3 episodes) |
| 1988 | Palace | Inspector | Jean-Michel Ribes | TV series (1 episode) |
| 1988 | Un jour à Rome | Gilbert | Roger Guillot | TV series (1 episode) |
| 1988 | Médecins des hommes | Philippe | Alain Corneau | TV series (1 episode) |
| 2003 | L'affaire Dominici | Inspector Sébeille | Pierre Boutron | TV movie |
| 2004 | 93, rue Lauriston | Inspector Blot | Denys Granier-Deferre | TV movie |

=== As a director ===
| Year | Title | Notes |
|---|---|---|
| 1984 | Marche à l'ombre | Also Writer and Actor; Nominated – César Award for Best Debut |
| 1994 | Grosse fatigue | Also Writer and Actor; Cannes Film Festival – Best Screenplay; Nominated – Palme d'Or; Nominated – César Award for Best Original Screenplay or Adaptation |
| 1999 | The Escort | Also Writer |
| 2002 | Summer Things | Also Writer and Actor; Nominated – César Award for Best Original Screenplay or Adaptation |
| 2018 | Voyez comme on danse | |
