= 19th César Awards =

1994 French film awards ceremony

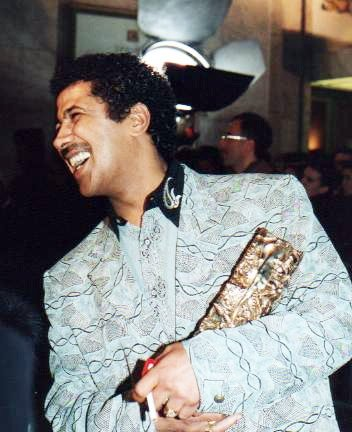
- Cheb Khaled Césars
- Date: 26 February 1994
- Site: Théâtre des Champs-Élysées, Paris, France
- Hosted by: Fabrice Luchini and Clémentine Célarié

Highlights
- Best Film: Smoking / No Smoking
- Best Actor: Pierre Arditi
- Best Actress: Juliette Binoche

Television coverage
- Network: Canal+

The 19th César Awards ceremony, presented by the Académie des Arts et Techniques du Cinéma, honoured the best French films of 1993 and took place on 26 February 1994 at the Théâtre des Champs-Élysées in Paris. The ceremony was chaired by Gérard Depardieu and hosted by Fabrice Luchini and Clémentine Célarié. Smoking / No Smoking won the award for Best Film.

== Winners and nominees ==
The winners are highlighted in bold:

- Best Film:
  **Smoking/No Smoking**, directed by Alain Resnais
  Germinal, directed by Claude Berri
  Ma saison préférée, directed by André Téchiné
  Trois Couleurs: Bleu, directed by Krzysztof Kieślowski
  Les Visiteurs, directed by Jean-Marie Poiré
- Best Foreign Film:
  **The Piano**, directed by Jane Campion
  Ba wang bie ji, directed by Chen Kaige
  Manhattan Murder Mystery, directed by Woody Allen
  Raining Stones, directed by Ken Loach
  The Snapper, directed by Stephen Frears
- Best Debut:
  **Mùi đu đủ xanh - L'odeur de la papaye verte**, directed by Tran Anh Hung
  Cible émouvante, directed by Pierre Salvadori
  Le Fils du requin, directed by Agnès Merlet
  Les Gens normaux n'ont rien d'exceptionnel, directed by Laurence Ferreira Barbosa
  Métisse, directed by Mathieu Kassovitz
- Best Actor:
  **Pierre Arditi**, for Smoking/No Smoking
  Daniel Auteuil, for Ma saison préférée
  Michel Boujenah, for Le Nombril du monde
  Christian Clavier, for Les Visiteurs
  Jean Reno, for Les Visiteurs
- Best Actress:
  **Juliette Binoche**, for Trois Couleurs: Bleu
  Miou-Miou, for Germinal
  Catherine Deneuve, for Ma saison préférée
  Sabine Azéma, for Smoking/No Smoking
  Josiane Balasko, for Tout le monde n'a pas eu la chance d'avoir des parents communistes
  Anouk Grinberg, for Un, deux, trois, soleil
- Best Supporting Actor:
  **Fabrice Luchini**, for Tout ça... pour ça !
  Jean-Pierre Darroussin, for Cuisine et dépendances
  Jean-Roger Milo, for Germinal
  Thomas Langmann, for Le Nombril du monde
  Didier Bezace, for Profil bas
- Best Supporting Actress:
  **Valérie Lemercier**, for Les Visiteurs
  Judith Henry, for Germinal
  Marthe Villalonga, for Ma saison préférée
  Marie Trintignant, for Les Marmottes
  Myriam Boyer, for Un, deux, trois, soleil
- Most Promising Actor:
  **Olivier Martinez**, for Un, deux, trois, soleil
  Guillaume Depardieu, for Cible émouvante
  Melvil Poupaud, for Les Gens normaux n'ont rien d'exceptionnel
  Christopher Thompson, for Les Marmottes
  Mathieu Kassovitz, for Métisse
- Most Promising Actress:
  **Valeria Bruni Tedeschi**, for Les Gens normaux n'ont rien d'exceptionnel
  Chiara Mastroianni, for Ma saison préférée
  Virginie Ledoyen, for Les Marmottes
  Karin Viard, for La Nage indienne
  Florence Pernel, for Trois Couleurs: Bleu
- Best Director:
  **Alain Resnais**, for Smoking/No Smoking
  Claude Berri, for Germinal
  André Téchiné, for Ma saison préférée
  Krzysztof Kieślowski, for Trois Couleurs: Bleu
  Bertrand Blier, for Un, deux, trois, soleil
  Jean-Marie Poiré, for Les Visiteurs
- Best Original Screenplay or Adaptation:
  **Jean-Pierre Bacri, Agnès Jaoui**, for Smoking/No Smoking
  Claude Berri, Arlette Langmann, for Germinal
  Pascal Bonitzer, André Téchiné, for Ma saison préférée
  Krzysztof Kieślowski, Krzysztof Piesiewicz, for Trois Couleurs: Bleu
  Jean-Marie Poiré, Christian Clavier, for Les Visiteurs
- Best Cinematography:
  **Yves Angelo**, for Germinal
  Renato Berta, for Smoking/No Smoking
  Sławomir Idziak, for Trois Couleurs: Bleu
- Best Costume Design:
  **Sylvie Gautrelet, Caroline de Vivaise, Moidele Bickel**, for Germinal
  Franca Squarciapino, for Louis, enfant roi
  Catherine Leterrier, for Les Visiteurs
- Best Sound:
  **Jean-Claude Laureux, William Flageollet**, for Trois Couleurs: Bleu
  Pierre Gamet, Dominique Hennequin, for Germinal
  Bernard Bats, Gérard Lamps, for Smoking/No Smoking
- Best Editing:
  **Jacques Witta**, for Trois Couleurs: Bleu
  Hervé de Luze, for Germinal
  Albert Jurgenson, for Smoking/No Smoking
  Catherine Kelber, for Les Visiteurs
- Best Music:
  **Khaled**, for Un, deux, trois, soleil
  Jean-Louis Roques, for Germinal
  Zbigniew Preisner, for Trois Couleurs: Bleu
  Eric Lévi, for Les Visiteurs
- Best Production Design:
  **Jacques Saulnier**, for Smoking/No Smoking
  Hoang Thanh At, for Germinal
  Jacques Bufnoir, for Justinien Trouvé, ou le bâtard de Dieu
- Best Short Film:
  **Gueule d'atmosphère**, directed by Olivier Péray
  Comment font les gens, directed by Pascale Bailly
  Emprientes, directed by Camille Guichard
- Honorary César:
  Jean Carmet

== See also ==
- 66th Academy Awards
- 47th British Academy Film Awards
