= Heroes Are Not Wet Behind the Ears =

- Directed by: Charles Nemes
- Written by: Gérard Jugnot; Charles Nemes
- Produced by: Georges V. Nemes
- Starring: Daniel Auteuil; Gérard Jugnot
- Cinematography: Étienne Fauduet
- Edited by: Marie-Sophie Dubus
- Music by: Jacques Delaporte
- Production companies: Atya Production; Terminus S.A.R.L.
- Distributed by: SND
- Release date: 17 January 1979
- Running time: 83 min.
- Language: French
- Box office: $155.000

Heroes Are Not Wet Behind the Ears or Les héros n'ont pas froid aux oreilles is a 1979 French comedy film directed by Charles Nemes.

== Plot ==
Two single men without stories that are cousins, working in the same bank and live in the same dwelling in Paris. Encouraged by their employer to break with a rhythm of monotonous life, they decided to rent a car (a new Ami 8 break ...) Scent of a Woman getaway to visit Bruges. However, their journey is just begun to finally abandoned after meeting a girl who hitchhiked.

== Cast ==
- Daniel Auteuil as Jean-Bernard
- Gérard Jugnot as Pierre
- Henri Guybet as Bertier
- Anne Jousset as Karine
- Nadia Barentin as Karine's Mother
- Michel Puterflam as Karine's Father
- Patricia Karim as Jacqueline
- Patrick Chauvel as Monsieur Blanquet
- Roland Giraud as The Director
- Josiane Balasko as A Client
- Martine Laroche-Joubert as A Client
- Gérard Lanvin as The Guard
- Jacques Legras as The Foreign Agent
- Michel Blanc as A Passerby
- Bruno Moynot as The Car Renter
- Thierry Lhermitte as The Tire Thief
- Christophe Malavoy as The Driver
- Martin Lamotte as The Bride
- Maaike Jansen as The Bride
- Marie-Anne Chazel as The 2CV Woman
- Christian Clavier as The 2CV Man
