= Zofia Borucka =

English model and actress (born 1972)

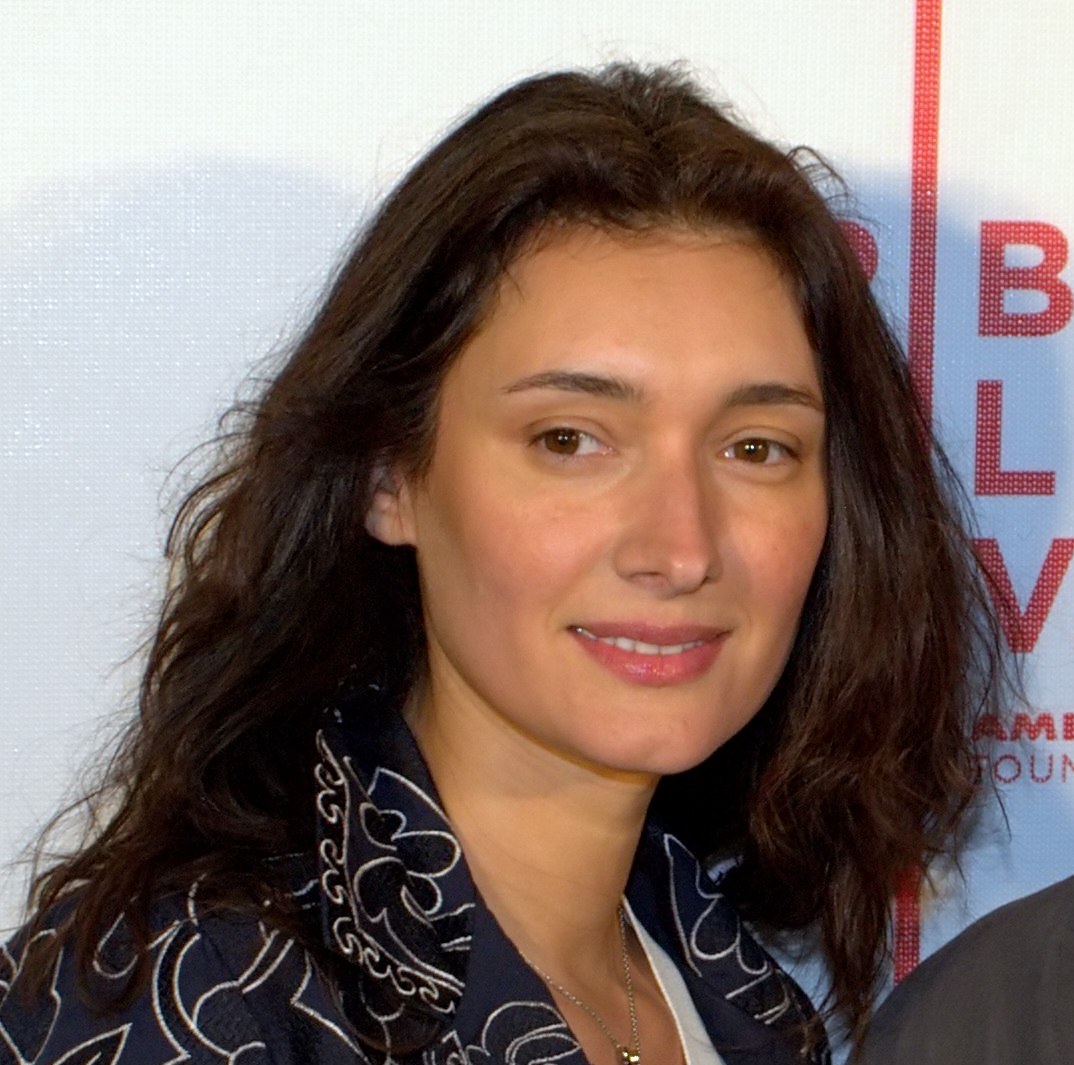
- Borucka in 2010
- Born: 24 February 1972 (age 54); London, England
- Citizenship: United Kingdom; United States; France
- Education: New York University
- Occupations: Actress; model
- Years active: 2000–present
- Spouse: Jean Reno (m. 2006)
- Children: 2

Zofia Borucka (born 24 February 1972) is an English model and actress.

== Early life and career ==
Born in London to Polish parents, Borucka grew up in England before moving to the United States to pursue her professional career. At the age of seventeen, she moved to the United States to study at New York University. There, she worked as a yoga instructor. She worked for many years for Ralph Lauren and later became the public face of the luxury brand Alexandre de Paris Accessoires. In addition, she has made small forays into the world of film.

== Personal life ==
In 2004, during the filming of The Pink Panther in New York, she met French actor Jean Reno, whom she would marry two years later in Les Baux. The ceremony had 300 guests, including celebrities from the world of cinema and other fields known to the couple, such as Muriel Robin, Luc Besson, Nicolas Sarkozy, Johnny Hallyday, Ron Howard, and Jean-Claude Gaudin.

Since 2007, they have lived together in New York.

She has two sons with him, named Cielo and Dean. Cielo was born in 2009 and Dean in 2011.

One of her closest friends is Jay-Z, whom she met when she moved to the United States.

== Filmography ==
=== Film ===
Year	Title	Role	Notes
2000	Lisa Picard Is Famous		
2001	K-PAX		
2002	Just a Kiss		
2003	Death of a Dynasty		
2006	Flyboys		
2009	The Pink Panther 2		

=== Television ===
Year	Title	Role	Notes
2003	Sex and the City	Hostess	Episode: "The Post-It Always Sticks Twice"
