= L'Antidote =

- Theatrical release poster
- Directed by: Vincent De Brus
- Written by: Éric Besnard; Jacques Besnard
- Produced by: Christian Fechner; Hervé Truffaut
- Starring: Christian Clavier; Jacques Villeret; Agnès Soral; Annie Grégorio; Alexandra Lamy; Thierry Lhermitte
- Cinematography: Laurent Machuel
- Edited by: Sylvie Gadmer
- Music by: Germinal Tenas
- Production companies: Les Films Christian Fechner; France 2 Cinéma
- Distributed by: Warner Bros. Pictures
- Release date: 30 March 2005
- Running time: 107 minutes
- Country: France
- Language: French
- Budget: €14.2 million
- Box office: $5.2 million

L'Antidote is a 2005 French comedy film directed by Vincent De Brus and produced by Christian Fechner. The film stars Christian Clavier and Jacques Villeret in the lead roles.

The film was released in France on 30 March 2005 by Warner Bros. Pictures. It drew around 766.921 admissions in France.

== Cast ==
- Christian Clavier as Jacques-Alain Marty
- Jacques Villeret as André Morin
- Agnès Soral as Nadine Marty
- Annie Grégorio as Andrée
- Alexandra Lamy as Elisabeth Fréoli
- Thierry Lhermitte as Doctor Morny
