= Christian Clavier =

French actor and screenwriter (born 1952)

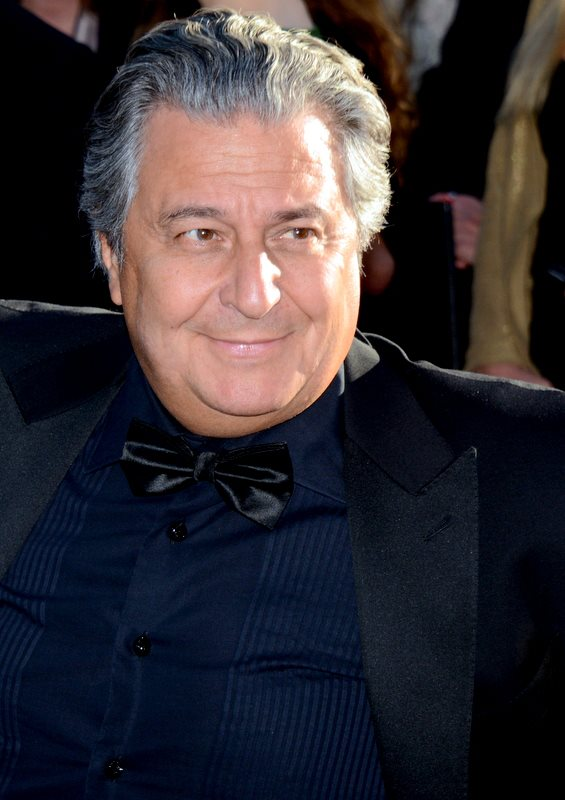
- Clavier at the 2013 Cannes Film Festival
- Born: Christian Jean-Marie Clavier; 6 May 1952 (age 74); Paris, France
- Citizenship: France; Belgium (since 2018)
- Occupations: Actor, screenwriter, film director, film producer
- Years active: 1973–present

Christian Jean-Marie Clavier (French pronunciation: [kʁistjɑ̃ ʒɑ̃ maʁi klavje]; born 6 May 1952) is a French actor, screenwriter, film producer and director. A co-founder of Le Splendid in the 1970s, a Parisian café-théâtre company which soon garnered success, he became widely popular after starring in two hit comedy series: Patrice Leconte's Les Bronzés and Jean-Marie Poiré's Les Visiteurs.

Clavier later furthered his popularity by taking the role of Asterix in screen adaptations of the renowned comic books by Albert Uderzo and René Goscinny. In 2023, President Emmanuel Macron saluted Clavier's work, stating: "You have been all the faces of the families of France, the infatuated son-in-law, the bewildered uncle, the pretentious cousin, the jealous husband, the cantankerous father. We have grown and aged with you and our children will grow and age with you".

He is the brother of director Stéphane Clavier.

== Life and career ==
After his high class studies at the Neuilly Lycée Pasteur (he is often mistakenly claimed to have studied at Institut d'Études Politiques de Paris (Sciences Po), which he never attended.) he started his actor career with the comedic theater troupe Splendid, which had hits with films like Les Bronzés font du ski and Le Père Noël est une ordure.

His most notable success without the Splendid group, and by far his biggest hit to date, was in the 1993 film les Visiteurs, where he played a character known as Jacquouille la Fripouille; the character's cry of "Okkkayyy!!" became a popular exclamation after the movie's success.

After les Visiteurs he was a star, participating in big-budget films like Astérix et Obélix contre César, Astérix & Obélix: Mission Cléopâtre, and the sequel and remake of Visiteurs. He also played several dramatic roles on television, including M. Thénardier in Les Misérables (2000 television version) and Napoléon in a biographical television film. In 2018, he returned to the character of Asterix, this time by providing the character's voice in the animated film Asterix: The Secret of the Magic Potion. Succeeding the character's original voice actor, Roger Carel, it was his first role in an animated movie.

Clavier has played in notable duos with:

- Jean Reno in les Visiteurs (the Visitors) and the US remake, Just Visiting, L'Opération Corned-Beef and L'Enquête Corse (The Corsican investigation).
- Gérard Depardieu in Astérix et Obélix (Asterix and Obelix) and Les anges gardiens.

He also runs a production company, Ouille Production.

He was made Chevalier (Knight) of the Ordre national du Mérite on 13 June 1998, and promoted Officier (Officer) in 2005. He was made Chevalier (Knight) of the Légion d'honneur in 2008.

He is a friend of former French président Nicolas Sarkozy, and in 2012 emigrated to the United Kingdom. He denies this was as a result of Francois Hollande's punitive tax policy.

In April 2025, he told Brut that the use of AI in cinema continues the tradition of early visual effects pioneered by Georges Méliès, saying that "cinema was already magical when it began."

== Filmography ==
=== Actor ===
Year	Title	Role	Director	Notes
1973	L'An 01	Viewer	Jacques Doillon	
1974	Les suspects	Photographer	Michel Wyn	
1974	Bonne présentation exigée	Heating Engineer	Charles Nemes	Short
1975	Let Joy Reign Supreme	Valet	Bertrand Tavernier	
1975	C'est pas parce qu'on a rien à dire qu'il faut fermer sa gueule...	Gay Cop	Jacques Besnard	
1975	Le bol d'air	Christian	Charles Nemes (2)	Short
1976	F comme Fairbanks	Waiter	Maurice Dugowson	
1976	Attention les yeux!	Cop	Gérard Pirès	
1977	This Sweet Sickness	François	Claude Miller	
1977	Spoiled Children	TV director	Bertrand Tavernier (2)	
1977	Vous n'aurez pas l'Alsace et la Lorraine	Narrator	Coluche	
1977	Le diable dans la boîte	Renaud	Pierre Lary	
1977	L'amour en herbe	Christian's friend	Roger Andrieux	
1978	Les Bronzés	Jerome Tarere	Patrice Leconte	
1978	La tortue sur le dos		Luc Béraud	
1979	Les Bronzés font du ski	Jerome Tarere	Patrice Leconte (2)	
1979	Heroes Are Not Wet Behind the Ears	2CV Man	Charles Nemes (3)	
1980	Cocktail Molotov	Beatnick	Diane Kurys	
1980	Je vais craquer!!!	Jérôme Ozendron	François Leterrier	
1981	Les Babas Cool	Antoine Bonfils	François Leterrier (2)	
1981	Clara et les Chics Types	Charles	Jacques Monnet	
1982	Le Père Noël est une ordure	Katia	Jean-Marie Poiré	
1982	Elle voit des nains partout!	The treacherous man	Jean-Claude Sussfeld	
1983	Papy fait de la résistance	Michel Taupin	Jean-Marie Poiré (2)	
1983	Rock 'n Torah	Isaac Stern	Marc-André Grynbaum	
1983	Merci Bernard			TV series (1 Episode)
1985	Tranches de vie	Charles-Henri	François Leterrier (3)	
1985	Le père Noël est une ordure	Katia	Philippe Galland	TV movie
1986	Twist again à Moscou	Iouri	Jean-Marie Poiré (3)	
1986	L'été 36	Alexis	Yves Robert	TV movie
1987	La vie dissolue de Gérard Floque	Edouard	Georges Lautner	
1988	Palace	Louis	Jean-Michel Ribes	TV series (1 Episode)
1988	Sueurs froides	Henri Descouet	Josée Dayan	TV series (1 Episode)
1989	My Best Pals	Jean-Michel Tuilier	Jean-Marie Poiré (4)	
1989	Les cigognes n'en font qu'à leur tête	DDASS's chief	Didier Kaminka	
1989	Fantômes sur l'oreiller	Brice	Pierre Mondy	TV movie
1989	Mieux vaut courir	Simon	Élisabeth Rappeneau	TV movie
1989	Double mixte	Bob Smith	Georges Folgoas	TV movie
1989	Si Guitry m'était conté		Yves-André Hubert	TV series (1 Episode)
1991	Les secrets professionnels du Dr Apfelglück	Lawyer	Thierry Lhermitte, Alessandro Capone, ...	
1991	L'Opération Corned-Beef	Jean-Jacques Granianski	Jean-Marie Poiré (5)	
1991	Les gens ne sont pas forcément ignobles	Pierre	Bernard Murat	TV movie
1992	Un fil à la patte	Fernand du Bois d'Enghien	Marion Sarraut	TV movie
1993	Les Visiteurs	Jacquouille la Fripouille	Jean-Marie Poiré (6)	Nominated – César Award for Best Actor; Nominated – César Award for Best Original Screenplay or Adaptation
1993	La Soif de l'or	Urbain Donnadieu	Gérard Oury	
1993	Homeward Bound: The Incredible Journey	Chance (voice)	Duwayne Dayne	French dub
1994	La Vengeance d'une blonde	Gérard Bréha	Jeannot Szwarc	
1994	Grosse Fatigue	Himself	Michel Blanc	
1995	Les Anges gardiens	Father Hervé Tarain	Jean-Marie Poiré (7)	
1996	Panique au Plazza		Jean-Marie Poiré (7)	TV movie
1997	Les Soeurs Soleil	Spectator	Jeannot Szwarc (2)	
1998	The Visitors II: The Corridors of Time	Jacquouille la Fripouille	Jean-Marie Poiré (8)	
1999	Asterix & Obelix Take On Caesar	Asterix	Claude Zidi	
2001	Just Visiting	Andre	Jean-Marie Poiré (9)	
2002	Asterix & Obelix: Mission Cleopatra	Asterix	Alain Chabat	
2002	Napoléon	Napoleon	Yves Simoneau	TV Mini-Series
2002	Les Misérables	Monsieur Thénardier	Josée Dayan	TV Mini-Series
2003	Lovely Rita, sainte patronne des cas désespérés	Edgar Lamarck	Stéphane Clavier	
2004	The Corsican File	Rémi François	Alain Berbérian	
2004	Albert est méchant	Patrick Lechat	Hervé Palud	
2005	L'Antidote	JAM	Vincent De Brus	
2006	Les Bronzés 3: Amis pour la vie	Jerome Tarere	Patrice Leconte (3)	
2006	L'Entente Cordiale	François de La Conche	Vincent De Brus (2)	
2006	The Crown Prince	Prime Minister Taaffe	Robert Dornhelm	TV miniseries
2007	L'Auberge rouge	Pierre Martin	Gérard Krawczyk	
2007	Le prix à payer	Jean-Pierre Ménard	Alexandra Leclère	
2007	Kaamelott	The Jurisconsult	Alexandre Astier	TV series (7 Episodes)
2008	Le malade imaginaire	Argan	Christian de Chalonge	TV movie
2009	La sainte Victoire	Vincent Cluzel	François Favrat	
2009	Le bourgeois gentilhomme	Monsieur Jourdain	Christian de Chalonge (2)	TV movie
2011	On ne choisit pas sa famille	César Borgnoli	Christian Clavier	
2011	La cage aux folles	Georges	Dominique Thiel	TV movie
2011	Les affaires sont les affaires	The Marquis de Porcellet	Philippe Bérenger	TV movie
2013	Serial Teachers	Serge Cutiro	Pierre-François Martin-Laval	
2013	Le Boeuf clandestin	M. Berthaud	Gérard Jourd'hui	TV movie
2014	Serial (Bad) Weddings	Claude Verneuil	Philippe de Chauveron	
2014	Do Not Disturb	Michel Leproux	Patrice Leconte (4)	
2014	Le grimoire d'Arkandias	Agénor Arkandias	Alexandre Castagnetti & Julien Simonet	
2015	Babysitting 2	Alain	Nicolas Benamou & Philippe Lacheau	
2016	Les Visiteurs: La Révolution	Jacquouille la Fripouille	Jean-Marie Poiré (10)	
2017	Un sac de billes	Doctor Rosen	Christian Duguay	
2017	With Open Arms	Jean-Étienne Fougerole		
2017	If I Were a Boy	Dr. Pace	Audrey Dana	
2018	Asterix: The Secret of the Magic Potion	Asterix	Louis Clichy & Alexandre Astier (2)	Voice role, replacing Roger Carel
2019	Serial (Bad) Weddings 2	Claude Verneuil		
2019	Convoi exceptionnel	Foster		
2021	Kaamelott: The First Chapter	The Jurisconsult	Alexandre Astier	

=== Producer ===
- Les Visiteurs 2 : Les Couloirs du temps (1998)
- Les Visiteurs en Amérique (2001)
- Le Cœur sur la main (2001)
- Lovely Rita, sainte patronne des cas désespérés (2003)

=== Box-office ===
Movies starring Christian Clavier with more than a million of admissions in France.

	Films	Director	Year	France (entries)
1	Asterix & Obelix: Mission Cleopatra	Alain Chabat	2002	14,559,509
2	Les Visiteurs	Jean-Marie Poiré	1993	13,782,991
3	Serial (Bad) Weddings	Philippe de Chauveron	2014	12,353,181
4	Les Bronzés 3: Amis pour la vie	Patrice Leconte	2006	10,355,930
5	Asterix & Obelix Take On Caesar	Claude Zidi	1999	8,948,624
6	The Visitors II: The Corridors of Time	Jean-Marie Poiré (2)	1998	8,043,129
7	Les Anges gardiens	Jean-Marie Poiré (3)	1995	5,793,034
8	Papy fait de la résistance	Jean-Marie Poiré (4)	1983	4,104,082
9	Les profs	Pierre-François Martin-Laval	2013	3,957,176
10	L'Enquête Corse	Alain Berbérian	2004	2,667,275
11	Les Bronzés	Patrice Leconte (2)	1978	2,308,644
12	La Vengeance d'une blonde	Jeannot Szwarc	1994	2,039,370
13	Grosse fatigue	Michel Blanc	1994	2,015,230
14	Le Père Noël est une ordure	Jean-Marie Poiré (5)	1982	1,582,732
15	Les Bronzés font du ski	Patrice Leconte (3)	1979	1,535,781
16	La Soif de l'or	Gérard Oury	1993	1,535,781
17	L'opération Corned Beef	Jean-Marie Poiré (6)	1991	1,475,580
18	Le prix à payer	Alexandra Leclère	2007	1,368,791
19	Twist again à Moscou	Jean-Marie Poiré (7)	1986	1,361,683
20	Just Visiting	Jean-Marie Poiré (8)	2001	1,217,623
21	Let Joy Reign Supreme	Bertrand Tavernier	1975	1,124,845
22	Je vais craquer!!!	François Leterrier	1980	1,053,217
23	Do Not Disturb	Patrice Leconte (4)	2014	1,006,867

== Honoring in modern art and media culture ==
Foto display of Christian Clavier on the photography mosaic panel of Thespian Fame, Facade of the Lichtburg Essen cinema theater. Lichtburg Essen is one of the oldest cinema theaters in FRG and till today the largest cinema hall in Germany.
