= Lovely Rita, sainte patronne des cas désespérés =

2003 film

- Directed by: Stéphane Clavier
- Written by: Christian Clavier; Louis Paraz
- Produced by: Christian Clavier; Alain Doutey
- Starring: Christian Clavier; Eddy Mitchell; Arielle Dombasle; Julie Gayet
- Cinematography: Yves Cape
- Edited by: Henri Revelou
- Music by: Michel Hardy; François Castello
- Production company: Gaumont
- Distributed by: Gaumont Buena Vista International
- Release date: 29 September 2003
- Running time: 80 minutes
- Country: France
- Language: French

Lovely Rita, sainte patronne des cas désespérés is a French film directed by Stéphane Clavier in 2003. The film stars his brother, Christian Clavier.

== Synopsis ==
Accounts expert, Edgar Lamark, is auditing the naval base of Thierry Ferrand on the Côte d'Azur. He's offered a prostitute recruited from a special website but has to get rid of the body of her previous client.

== Technical details ==
- Title : Lovely Rita, sainte patronne des cas désespérés
- Director: Stéphane Clavier
- Writer : Inspired by the crime novel by Benjamin Legrand (Série noire)
- Producers: Christian Clavier and Alain Doutey
- Country of origin : France
- Length : 80 minutes
- Release: 24 (France)

== Starring ==
- Christian Clavier : Edgar Lamarck
- Julie Gayet : Rita
- Eddy Mitchell : Thierry Ferrand
- Arielle Dombasle : Mlle Lecas
- Pierre Mondy : Marcel
- Marthe Villalonga : Renée
- Jean-Claude Dreyfus : The antique dealer
- Arnaud Giovaninetti : Kevin
- Yan Dron : Franck
- Christian Gazio : José
- Steve Tran : Danny
- Mhamed Arezki : City boy

== About the film ==
- The idea for the film was raised by Christian Clavier after having read the crime novel Lovely Rita by Benjamin Legrand
- Reviews were very poor, and the film was a commercial failure.
- The director Stéphane Clavier is the brother of the actor and writer Christian Clavier and the nephew of producer Yves Rousset-Rouard.
- The title of the film is a reference to Rita of Cascia, who is actually the saint of desperate cases.
