= The Corsican File =

- Theatrical release poster
- Directed by: Alain Berbérian
- Screenplay by: Christian Clavier; Michel Delgado
- Based on: The Corsican File by René Pétillon
- Produced by: Alain Goldman; Catherine Morisse
- Starring: Christian Clavier; Jean Reno; Caterina Murino; Didier Flamand
- Cinematography: Pascal Gennesseaux
- Edited by: Véronique Parnet
- Music by: Alexandre Desplat
- Production company: Gaumont
- Distributed by: Gaumont
- Release date: 6 October 2004
- Country: France
- Language: French

The Corsican File (French: L'Enquête Corse, lit. 'The Corsican investigation') is a 2004 French comedy film directed by Alain Berbérian. It is based on the comic book of the same name, one of the stories from the Jack Palmer series by René Pétillon. The film was produced by Gaumont and Legend, and written by Christian Clavier and Michel Delgado. The story follows the escapades of private investigator Jack Palmer, a pseudonym of Rémi Francois, trying to locate a man living on the island of Corsica who is to inherit a property from a will.

== Cast ==
- Christian Clavier as Rémi François / Jack Palmer
- Jean Reno as Ange Leoni
- Caterina Murino as Léa
- Didier Flamand as Dargent
- Pierre Salasca as Matéo
- Eric Fraticelli (credited as Pido) as Figoli
- Alain Maratrat as De Vlaminck
- François Orsoni as Balducci
- Nathanaël Maïni as Grappa
- Albert Dray as Le capitaine de gendarmerie
- Philippe Guerrini as Le Marseillais
- Daniel Delorme as Doumé
- Guy Cimino as Borgnoli
- Jo Fondacci as Diazep
- Tzek as Bruno

== Reception ==
Nicolas Jouenne of Le Figaro said, "And you must admit that the two actors stick to their characters perfectly! Although he has not adopted the unmistakable look of Jack Palmer, Christian Clavier is shown in a relatively convincing interpretation while retaining far from his usual bidding a bit boring. Facing him, Jean Reno turns out perfect in solitary independence leader and blood, in addition to the Corsican accent!"
