= Ma femme s'appelle reviens =

- Directed by: Patrice Leconte
- Written by: Michel Blanc; Patrice Leconte; Joseph Morhaim
- Produced by: Christian Fechner
- Starring: Michel Blanc; Anémone
- Cinematography: Robert Fraisse
- Edited by: Jacqueline Thiédot
- Music by: William Sheller
- Production company: Les Films Christian Fechner
- Distributed by: AMLF
- Release date: 1982
- Running time: 85 minutes
- Country: France
- Language: French
- Box office: $3.2 million

Ma femme s'appelle reviens (French: roughly translates as I wouldn't mind having my wife back) is a 1982 French comedy film directed by Patrice Leconte and starring Michel Blanc and Anémone.

== Plot ==
Bernard has been brutally left by his wife, without even a file for divorce, and attempts to absolutely get her back, on the sudden departure of her flight for Lausanne, but he fails. Having committed several infractions during his trip, he is arrested by the police but is finally free a few hours later.

Firmly convinced that they were happy together, Bernard does not understand why she is gone. Trying to forget it but having a hard time overcoming his sorrow, he goes living in a residence "for bachelors". Employed by SOS Médecins, he decides to ensure the overnight care to occupy his insomnia. He is demanded one evening to rescue a neighbor, Nadine Foulon, who has gotten ill in an elevator. Nadine is also crossing a difficult period, since her partner Terry, a singer and guitarist, has completely abandoned her and is continuing to "mess" with her feelings. Working as a photographer, she is unable to forget it and swings between depression and bulimia.

== Cast ==
- Michel Blanc ... Bernard Fizet
- Anémone ... Nadine Foulon
- Xavier Saint-Macary ... Philippe
- Christophe Malavoy ... Terry
- Catherine Gandois ... Mireille
- Pascale Rocard ... Anne
- Michel Rivard .. Alexandre
- Sylvia Zerbib ... daughter of the real-estate agent
- Patrick Bruel ... François, Anne's friend
- Charlotte de Turckheim ... Mademoiselle Gauthier
- Jean-Michel Ribes ... police officer
- Jean-Paul Lilienfeld ... thief in the bar
- Gilles Dyan ... Antoine
- Ellen Von Unwerth ... Kerstin
- Laura Gomez ... Caroline
