= Stéphane Clavier =

French film director, actor and screenwriter

- Born: 14 March 1955 (age 70); France
- Occupations: Screenwriter, director
- Years active: 1977–present
- Relatives: Christian Clavier (brother)

Stéphane Clavier (born 14 March 1955) is a French screenwriter and film director.

== Personal life ==
Stéphane is the brother of actor Christian Clavier.

== Filmography ==
Year	Title	Role	Box office	Notes
1977	Une fille cousue de fil blanc	Trainee	$5.3 million	Directed by Michel Lang
1978	French Fried Vacation	Trainee Assistant Director	$17.3 million	Directed by Patrice Leconte
1979	French Fried Vacation 2	Second Assistant Director	$11.5 million	Directed by Patrice Leconte (2)
1980	The Umbrella Coup	Second Assistant Director	$18.4 million	Directed by Gérard Oury
1980	Je vais craquer !!!	Assistant director	$7.9 million	Directed by François Leterrier
1981	Clara et les Chics Types	Assistant director	$3 million	Directed by Jacques Monnet
1981	Pourquoi pas nous ?	Second Assistant Director	$1.7 million	Directed by Michel Berny
1982	Elle voit des nains partout !	First Assistant Director	$3.3 million	Directed by Jean-Claude Sussfeld
1983	One Deadly Summer	Assistant director	$38.5 million	Directed by Jean Becker
1984	My New Partner	First Assistant Director	$44.1 million	Directed by Claude Zidi
1985	Le mariage du siècle	Assistant director & Actor	$11.2 million	Directed by Philippe Galland
1986	Le torero hallucinogène	Director & writer		Short; Nominated - César Award for Best Short Film
1987	Association de malfaiteurs	Assistant director	$9 million	Directed by Claude Zidi (2)
1991	The Professional Secrets of Dr. Apfelgluck	Director	$3.7 million	
1998	La voie est libre	Director & writer	$280.000	
2001	Le divin enfant	Director		TV movie
2002	Patron sur mesure	Director		TV movie
2003	Lovely Rita, sainte patronne des cas désespérés	Director & writer	$815.000	
2004	3 garçons, 1 fille, 2 mariages	Director		TV movie
2004	Si j'étais elle	Director		TV movie
2005-08	Merci, les enfants vont bien !	Director & writer		TV series (12 episodes); Luchon International Film Festival - Grand Prize Series
2006	Alice et Charlie	Director		TV series (1 episode)
2007	Je hais les vacances	Director		TV movie
2009	Drôle de famille !	Director		TV series (1 episode)
2010	Les Bleus	Director		TV series (3 episodes)
2011	L'épervier	Director & writer		TV series (6 episodes)
2011	Doc Martin	Director		TV series (3 episodes)
2012	À dix minutes des naturistes	Director		TV movie
2013	Vive la colo !	Director		TV series (6 episodes)
2015	Lettre à France	Director		TV movie
2016	Frères à demi	Director		TV movie
2016	Famille d'accueil	Director		TV series (2 episodes)
