= Les Visiteurs =

1993 fantasy film by Jean-Marie Poiré

- Theatrical release poster
- Directed by: Jean-Marie Poiré
- Written by: Jean-Marie Poiré; Christian Clavier
- Produced by: Alain Terzian
- Starring: Christian Clavier; Jean Reno; Valérie Lemercier; Marie-Anne Chazel; Christian Bujeau; Isabelle Nanty; Didier Pain
- Cinematography: Jean-Yves Le Mener
- Edited by: Catherine Kelber
- Music by: Eric Lévi (Era); Felix Mendelssohn Bartholdy
- Production companies: Gaumont; France 3 Cinéma; Alplles Productions; Amigo Productions
- Distributed by: Gaumont Buena Vista International
- Release date: 27 January 1993
- Running time: 107 minutes
- Country: France
- Language: French
- Budget: $9.5 million
- Box office: $98.8 million

Les Visiteurs (French pronunciation: [le vizitœʁ]; English: The Visitors) is a 1993 French fantasy comedy film directed by Jean-Marie Poiré. It stars the duo of Christian Clavier and Jean Reno, and Valérie Lemercier. It also features Marie-Anne Chazel, Christian Bujeau, Isabelle Nanty and Didier Pain in supporting roles. In the film, a 12th-century knight and his squire travel in time to the end of the 20th century and find themselves adrift in modern society.

Les Visiteurs was the highest-grossing film in France in 1993 and remains one of the highest-grossing films in the country today. The publicity for the film used the tagline Ils ne sont pas nés d'hier ("They weren't born yesterday"). After its box office success, the film was nominated eight times for the 19th César Awards. It won the César for Best Supporting Actress, awarded to Valérie Lemercier. The success of the film and its cliffhanger ending led to a sequel, The Visitors 2: The Corridors of Time, which was itself followed by a third film, The Visitors: Bastille Day, forming a trilogy, entirely produced by Jean-Marie Poiré. The film also has an English-language remake Just Visiting. The castle of Ermenonville in the Oise département served as the set for the castle of Montmirail in the modern day and the Cité de Carcassonne for the medieval castle.

== Plot ==
In the year 1123, King Louis VI, known also as Louis the Fat, is on a romantic escapade with the niece of the King of England. One of his vassals, Count Godefroy de Montmirail, nicknamed "the Bold", guards their meeting place. Having to flee from incoming enemy troops, Louis VI finds himself faced with an English soldier who seeks to capture him. The Count then saves his king's life by killing the English soldier. As a reward, Godefroy is promised to be married to his long-time beloved, Frénégonde de Pouilles, the daughter of Duke Fulbert de Pouilles. The Count sets out towards his castle where the wedding is set to take place. He is accompanied by his men and his faithful squire, Jacquouille la Fripouille. Along the way, they capture a witch living in a forest. They imprison her in a cage with the aim of bringing her to the inquisition afterwards.

Arriving near the castle, Godefroy changes outfits to present himself to his newly betrothed Frénégonde. Frénégonde is informed of the arrival of Godefroy and runs out of the castle to join him, pursued by her father who tries to restrain her eagerness. Taking advantage of a moment of inattention on the part of her jailers, the witch pours a potion into Godefroy's gourd, which Godefroy drinks shortly afterwards. He starts seeing hallucinations: he sees the castle distorting and his men with animal faces. When Godefroy sees his bride running across the fields, the potion makes him believe she is being chased by a bear, when it is in fact her father the Duke de Pouilles who is running behind her. Godefroy grabs his crossbow to protect Frénégonde and he kills his future father-in-law with a crossbow bolt to the head.

While the occupants of the castle gather in a chapel near the remains of the Duke, Frénégonde takes an oath to retire to a convent for the rest of her life: she says she cannot marry the man who killed her father. Jacquouille, who was busy keeping the flies away from the dead body, takes advantage of everyone else's departure to steal the Duke's heavy gold necklace, set with precious stones. He hides it behind the office in the hollow head of a statue.

Godefroy travels to the mage Eusæbius, a man versed in the magic of time, in order to repair his mistake and ensure he can create a lasting lineage with Frénégonde. The mage concocts a potion for Godefroy to send him back to the past shortly before the accident. The Count makes Jacquouille taste the potion, to make sure it is not poisoned, then drinks it himself. Eusæbius recites the magic formula and Godefroy and Jacquouille disappear together. The first is transformed into a crystal statue, the second into a pile of excrement. The mage then realizes that he has forgotten the quail eggs in the potion, an essential ingredient, and declares in alarm that "it's a catastrophe".

Jacquouille and Godefroy wake up in a wood that they do not recognize as the woods of Montmirail. While Godefroy finds trash in a pond, Jacquouille goes further and discovers an asphalt road. A Renault 4 car belonging to the French postal service arrives and brakes suddenly in front of Jacquouille, who is stunned when he sees the machine. The squire begins to hit the car and the postman, who is Black, gets out of the vehicle to complain. Jacquouille, frightened, runs back to the woods to warn his master of the presence of a "Saracen". While the postman is putting the sheet metal of his car back in place, he sees the two medieval men approaching him, with a menacing look. Godefroy throws at the car and the postman runs away while the two travelers conscientiously destroy the vehicle.

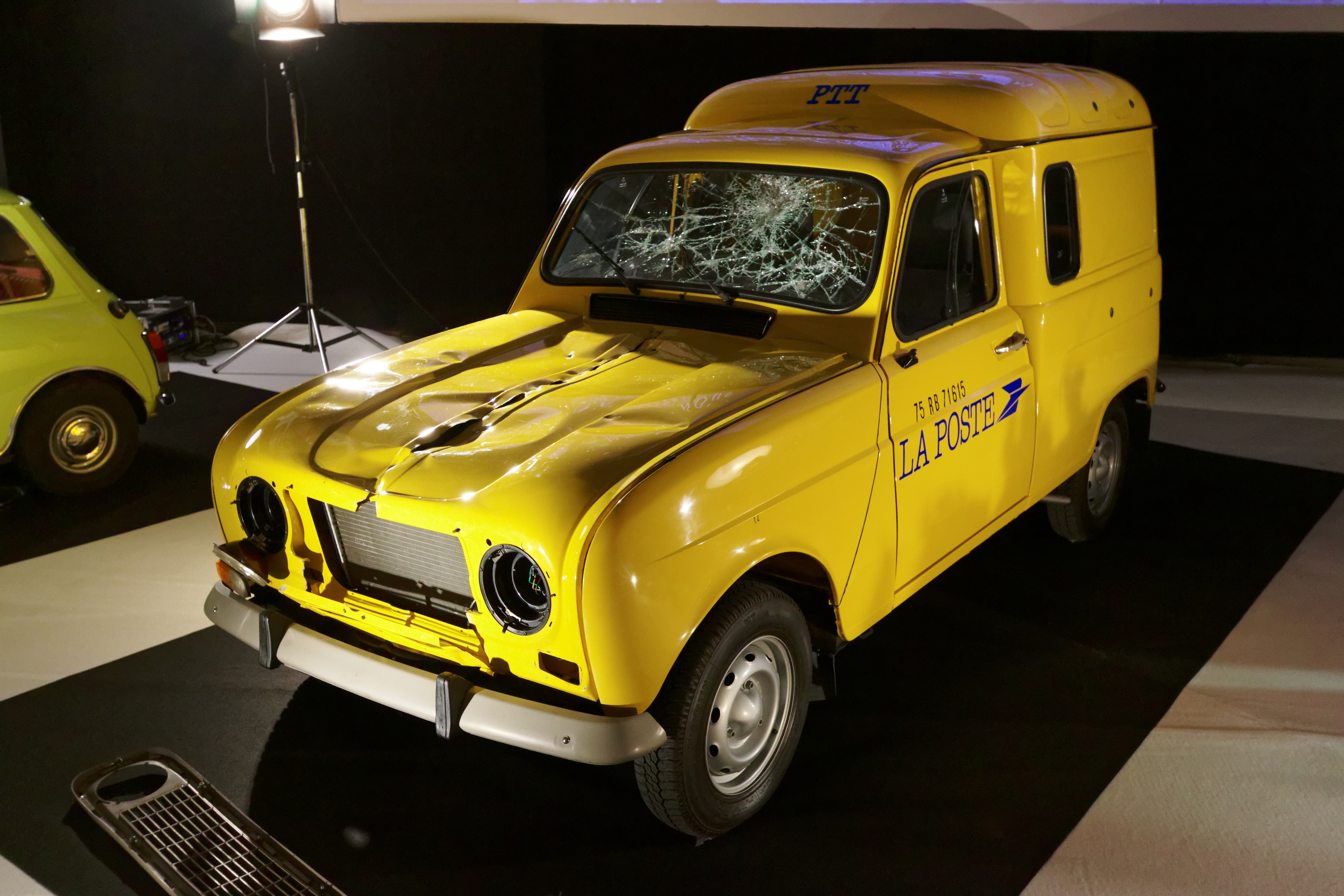
Renault R4 Fourgonnette

As Godefroy finds and rides a horse, followed by his squire, they steal food from a restaurant. They meet Ginette Sarcley, an eccentric homeless person who lives nearby. She receives a few coins in exchange for her leaving them. Not understanding their attire or their actions, she thinks they are in the "show business" and starts singing. After a scuffle with the restaurant manager who threatens them with a gun, Godefroy flees on horseback and loses sight of Jacquouille who leaves with Ginette in the opposite direction.

The Count feels lost in this new place, he recognizes nothing of his world as he rides across the fields. He enters a church with his horse, throws himself to the ground, and begs for asylum from the stunned priest. The priest contacts a woman from his parish, Béatrice de Montmirail, an upper-class mother, and informs her that a man claiming to be the Count de Montmirail and displaying his family's coat of arms on his tunic is with him at the office. Godefroy discovers with amazement, thanks to a calendar on the wall, that it is the year 1992.

When Béatrice introduces herself to him, he initially mistakes her for his betrothed, Frénégonde, before realizing that she is in reality his direct descendant. Béatrice does not take his claims that he comes from the 12th century seriously and calls the police on him. A fight occurs with the police and the doctor who has come to treat him. After throwing the doctor out the window, Godefroy goes outside, ready to face an entire squadron of riot police. While being attacked the Count will make Béatrice think twice about who he is by saying "Montjoie! St Denis!", the battle cry of French knights and more importantly "May I die if I weaken!", the motto of the first Count Godefroy and his house. Béatrice starts doubting that Godefroy is not of her family. Godefroy is overpowered by the riot police and sent to the psychiatric hospital.

Jacquouille, meanwhile, gets to know Ginette. She sees him as a man of the same condition as herself and speaks to him frankly. She misunderstands parts of what he tells her, but manages to understand that Godefroy is from the family of Béatrice de Montmirail. Ginette has already met the Countess, because she lives in the village next door. Together they go the Countess to talk about Godefroy, presented by Ginette as a "stuntman and wrestler". Béatrice misunderstands Godefroy's identity and believes that he is her cousin Hubert, another one of Godefroy's descendants and a rally driver who has been missing for several years. She thinks he came back with amnesia after an accident in Borneo. Béatrice realizes that she has sent a family member to the asylum by mistake. She goes there with her husband, Jean-Pierre, a dentist, to have him released. Béatrice takes the two time travelers to her home. They discover several novel elements of the modern world, causing various disasters such as the flooding of the living room. Godefroy is surprised that, as a Montmirail, she does not live in their ancestral castle. She tells him that the family has not lived at the castle for several years. The building was bought by Jacques-Henri Jacquart, a rich boy from the family of their former sharecroppers. Godefroy is appalled that a peasant now owns his castle. In the evening, Jacquart comes to visit them accompanied by Mr. Berney, president of a banking group who suffers from a toothache. While Jean-Pierre takes care of Mr. Berney, Jacquart, who turns out to be the direct descendant of Jacquouille, meets Godefroy and Jacquouille towards whom he expresses strong contempt. He is outraged that Béatrice mistakes him for Jacquouille's brother (to whom he closely resembles physically). Godefroy offers to buy the castle but Jacquart flatly refuses and leaves.

During the night, Godefroy wakes up Béatrice and asks her to teach him the history of France since the reign of Louis the Fat. While she presents him with the Larousse encyclopedia (which Godefroy does not like because he is not mentioned anywhere), she notices on his hand a ring bearing the seal of the Count Godefroy. She therefore thinks that her cousin Hubert has stolen it from the castle. The next day, she leaves for Montmirail accompanied by Godefroy and Jacquouille to return the ring to Jacquart. During the journey, the Count maintains that this ring is his, but Beatrice retorts that there is only one and that she cannot be both with him and at the castle. At the same time, the modern version of the ring begins to heat up and sizzle in a window of the castle, disturbing President Berney's meeting in the room. The closer the car gets to the castle, the worse this situation gets, and it culminates in the flying of the two rings, one through the window of the castle, the other through the roof of the car, which meet in the sky, explode and fall on Jacquart's SUV.

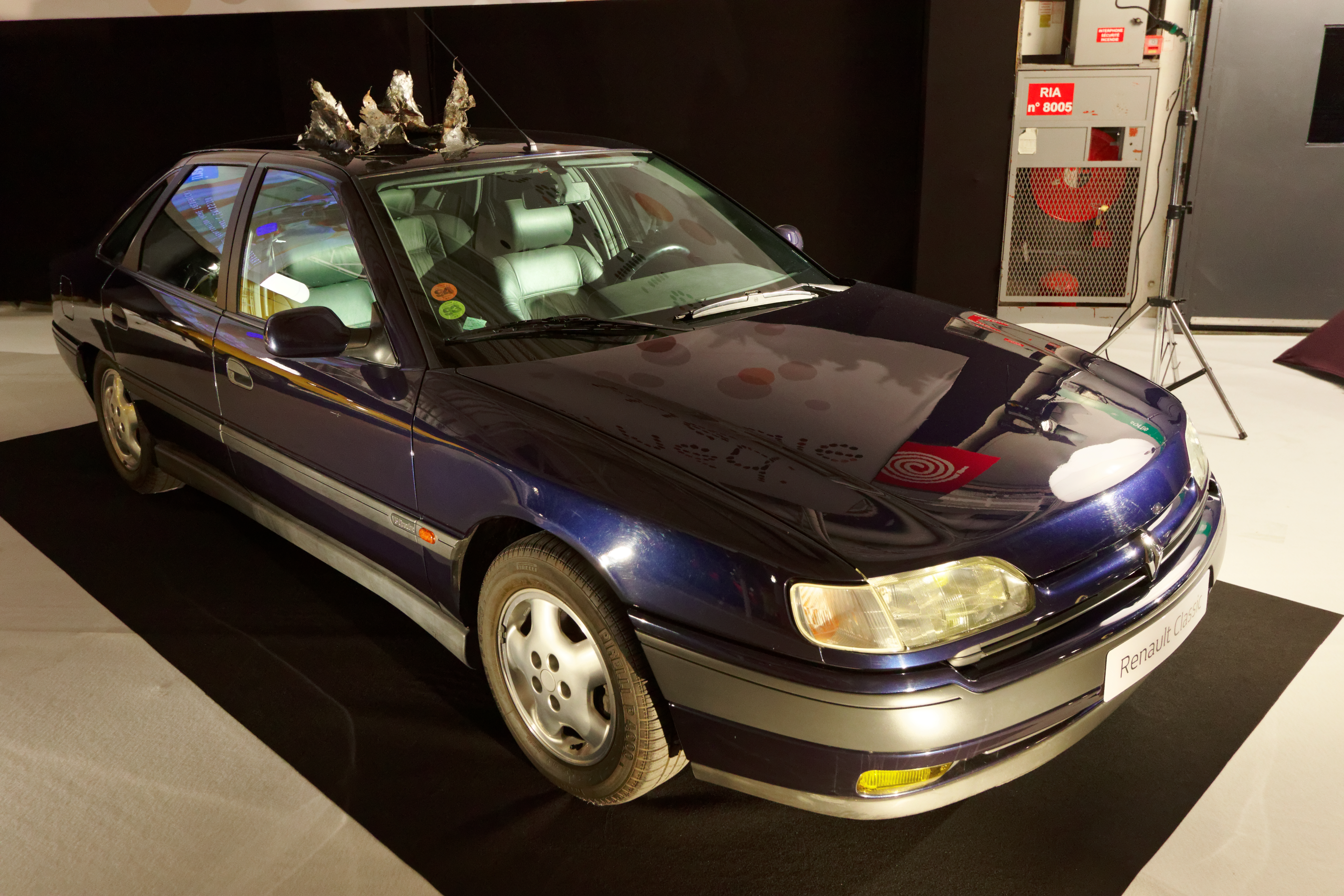
Béatrice's car, a Renault Safrane

Godefroy asks the receptionist to show him the Count's room. He tells Béatrice of his desire to stay in the castle, because "a Montmirail stays in Montmirail". Béatrice is reluctant given the high cost of such a stay, but when Godefroy wants to pay Jacquart with his own old coins, she agrees to pay. Godefroy and his squire go to the Count's room where they dismiss the receptionist harshly. Godefroy finds in the chimney (the last vestige of the medieval castle) a secret mechanism revealing an underground passage. Jacquart, Béatrice, and the receptionist try to find them. All three enter the suite while the two travelers are hidden in the secret passage which has closed behind them. Godefroy and Jacquouille return to the room with a loud noise and covered in soot. They make up a story about having to climb the chimney to free a large tow stuck in the chimney. Béatrice realizes they are lying and demands an explanation. Godefroy replies that he is not cousin Hubert, but the Count himself, which Béatrice still refuses to believe. After asking Jacquouille to fetch him a torch to explore the place, Godefroy then shows Béatrice the underground. Since the place is very dark, she goes back to look for a torch. During this time, Jacquouille meets Mr. Berney's assistant, Fabienne Morlot, who still mistakes him for Jacquart's brother. He tells her about the tragic fate of his parents. Fabienne leaves and Jacquouille goes to the aid of Ginette, who is being kicked out by the butler of the castle. He ends up leaving her alone, thinking also that Jacquouille is the boss's brother. After breaking a piece of armor in the management office, Ginette and Jacquouille are chased by a dog that Jacquart, exasperated, has unleashed on them. They rush into the castle's chapel where Jacquouille finds the duke's necklace that he had hidden in 1123. To escape, they manage to trap the dog by trapping it in a large bag in the chapel.

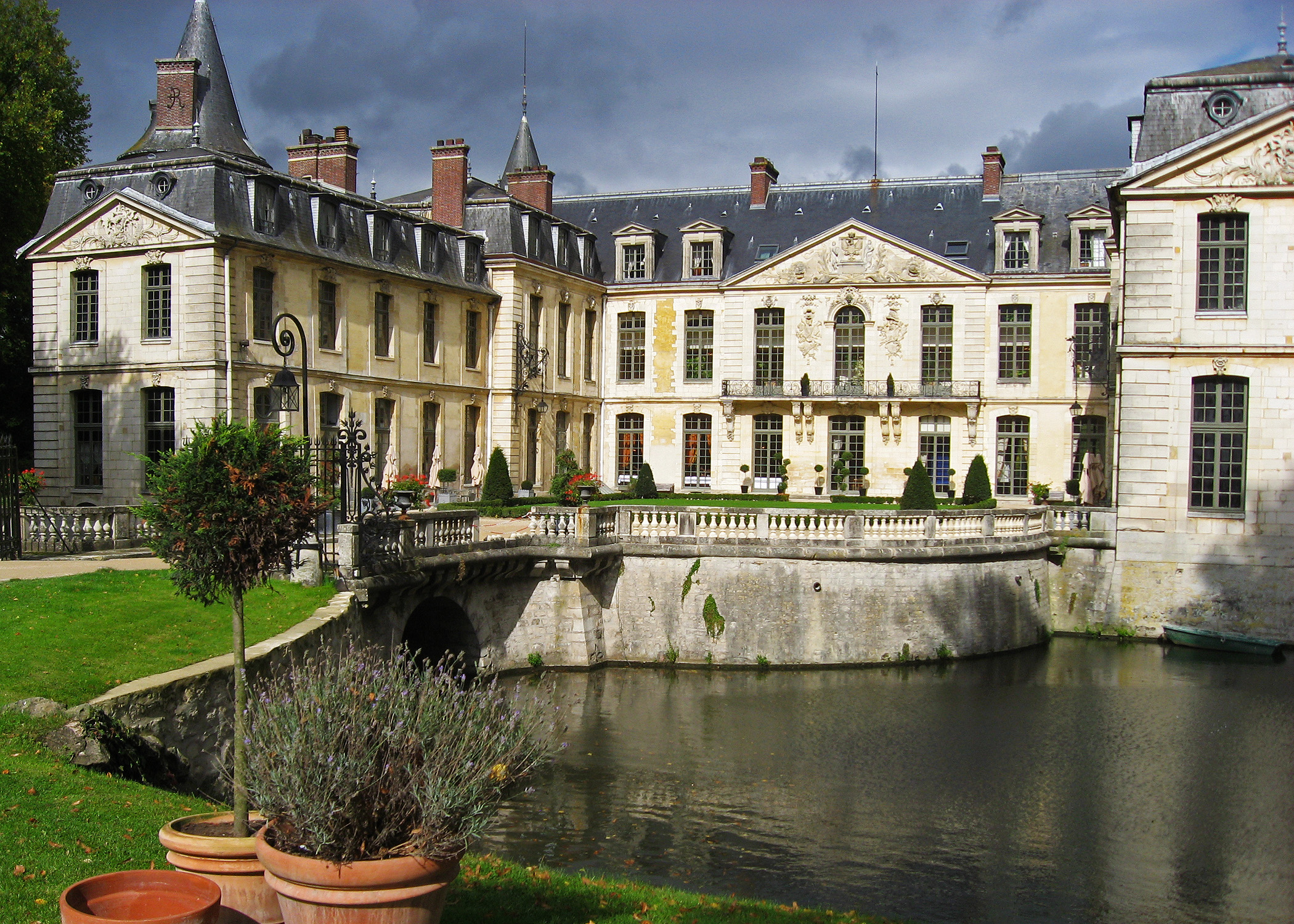
The modern Montmirail Castle, the castle of Ermenonville in real life.

Béatrice returns with a lamp, she and Godefroy explore the underground network. They eventually find the enchanter's laboratory, but the grimoires present are moldy and unusable. Béatrice then notices a note telling Godefroy to contact a certain Ferdinand Eusebius, a medium who turns out to be a descendant of the mage. Ferdinand has made for Godefroy, from his ancestor's grimoires, the potion that would allow him to return to his time. He asks the Count to leave as quickly as possible with his squire, otherwise another future where Godefroy will have no descendants will replace the current future. Back at the castle, Godefroy receives a call from Jacquouille, then at the bowling alley with Ginette. He tells his master that he wants to marry her and stay in this era. Godefroy then scares Jacquouille by telling his squire that if they do not leave, their bodies will rot and decompose. In the end, Jacquouille decides to return to the castle. Godefroy returns to his room and finds Béatrice there, who was showing Jean-Pierre around the underground network. The Count dismisses them, but Jacquart, accompanied by the police marshal, arrives in the room to confront Godefroy. Godefroy force-feeds them sleeping pills and locks them underground in cages.

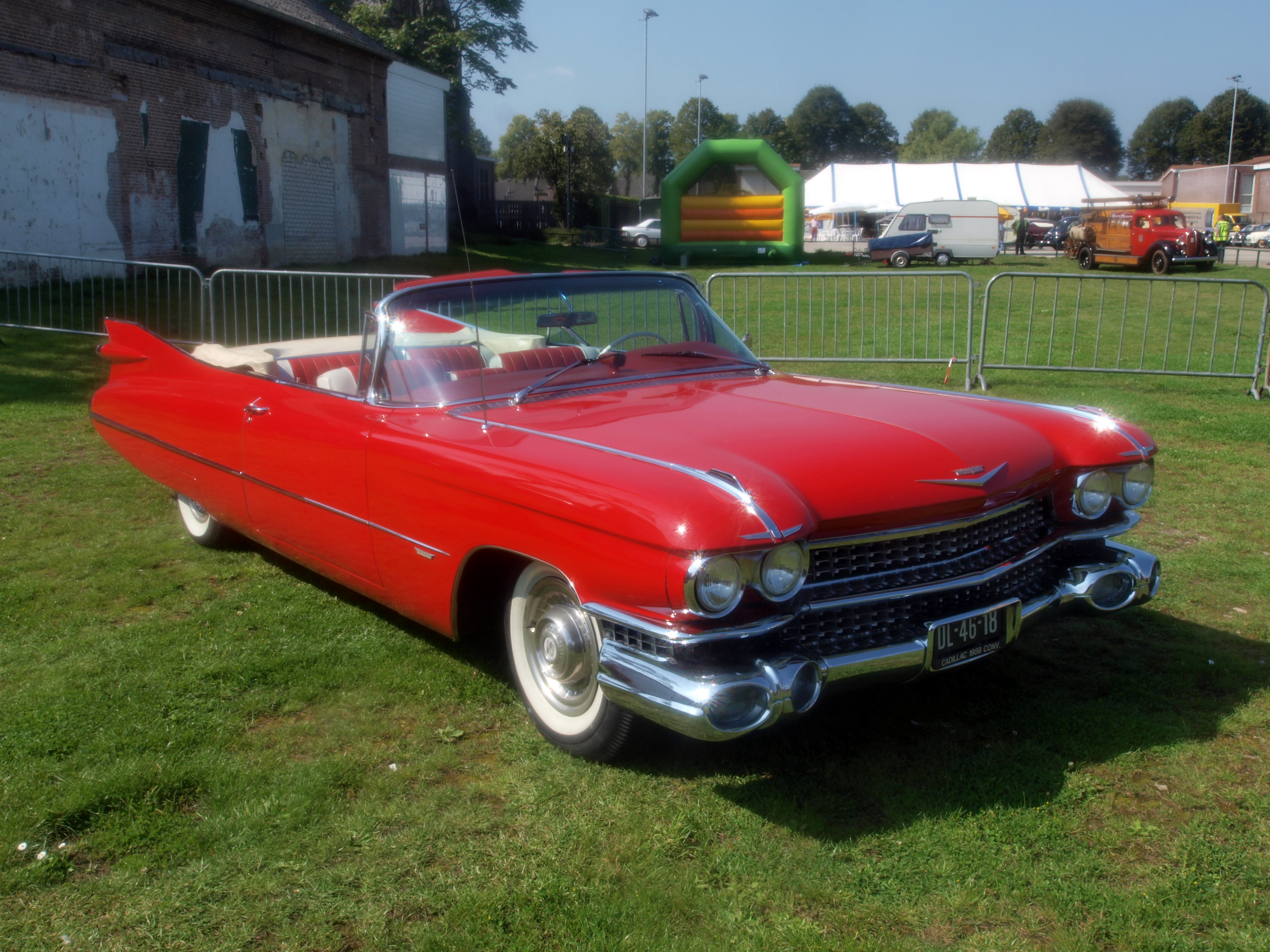
The Cadillac Series 62 car Jacquouille and Ginette ride in.

At dinner, while Godefroy recounts his old exploits, Jacquouille returns to the castle with Ginette at the wheel of a Cadillac, and announces to his master that he can stay here, because he has found "the cure against rot": toothpaste. Infuriated, Godefroy grabs Jacquouille, takes him to the Count's room and orders him to accompany him. Jacquouille refuses, preferring to be a free man in 1992 than a squire enslaved to his master in 1123. While he hears complaints coming from the underground, Godefroy explains to him that he has imprisoned Jacquart there. Béatrice knocks on the door and asks for explanations. While Godefroy repeats to her that he is indeed the first Count, Jacquouille takes advantage of this interruption to go underground and fetch Jacquart, still groggy from sleeping pills, exchange his clothes with his own and place him in his place in the bedroom. Godefroy then makes Jacquart drink the potion before reciting the formula to bring him back to 1123. Béatrice, moved by meeting her ancestor, understands that Godefroy is indeed who he claims to be. Just as moved, Godefroy in turn drinks the potion and, after bidding farewell to his descendant, recites the formula. Jean-Pierre and the police then burst into the room. Jacquouille then appears, before disappearing. Béatrice then understands that the wrong person has been sent back in time.

Godefroy is back in his time, a few moments before firing his crossbow. He remembers the enchanter's words and finds in himself enough willpower to deflect the shot. Godefroy concentrates, the bolt suddenly slows down and is redirected towards the witch. The Duke is saved and Godefroy happily finds Frénégonde, whom he can now marry. Jacquart wakes up stunned in the mud, surrounded by peasants and Godefroy's men, and, disoriented, runs after the man he still thinks is cousin Hubert, in desperation and confusion.

== Cast ==
- Christian Clavier: Jacquouille la Fripouille (in English, Jacquasse la Crasse) / Jacques-Henri Jacquard
- Jean Reno: Godefroy de Montmirail, Count of Montmirail, Apremont and Papincourt
- Valérie Lemercier: Frénégonde de Pouille / Béatrice de Montmirail
- Christian Bujeau: Jean-Pierre Goulard
- Marie-Anne Chazel: Ginette la Clocharde
- Isabelle Nanty: Fabienne Morlot
- Gérard Séty: Edgar Bernay
- Didier Pain: Louis VI le Gros (the Fat)
- Jean-Paul Muel: Maréchal-des-Logis Gibon
- Arielle Séménoff: Jacqueline
- Michel Peyrelon: Édouard Bernay
- Pierre Vial: Eusebius the Wizard / Monsieur Ferdinand
- François Lalande: The priest
- Didier Bénureau: Doctor Beauvin
- Frédéric Baptiste: Freddy

== Reception ==
Les Visiteurs received positive reviews and opened at number one in France with a gross of 17.6 million French francs ($3.3 million) for the week and remained there for ten weeks. It returned to number one for another 7 weeks and was the highest-grossing film in France in 1993 with 13,782,846 ticket sales and a gross of $78 million. It was the highest-grossing non-English language film worldwide that year with a gross of $98.8 million. It remains one of the highest grossing French films ever.

On the review aggregator website Rotten Tomatoes, 31% of 13 critics' reviews are positive.

== Awards and nominations ==
- César Awards (France)
  - Won: Best Actress – Supporting Role (Valérie Lemercier)
  - Nominated: Best Actor – Leading Role (Christian Clavier)
  - Nominated: Best Actor – Leading Role (Jean Reno)
  - Nominated: Best Costume Design (Catherine Leterrier)
  - Nominated: Best Director (Jean-Marie Poiré)
  - Nominated: Best Editing (Catherine Kelber)
  - Nominated: Best Film
  - Nominated: Best Music (Eric Levi)
  - Nominated: Best Original Screenplay or Adaptation (Christian Clavier and Jean-Marie Poiré)

== Home media ==
The film was released on video in France on 15 December 1993. Permission needed to be sought from the French government to release it less than a year after its theatrical release.

== Video game ==
A video game developed by Cryo Interactive and Darkworks Interactive and published by Ubisoft was released in March 1998 for the PC. It was developed with a budget of 5m Fr. A Game Boy Color game developed by Planet Interactive Development and published by Ubisoft would later be released in November 1999.

== Sequels and remake ==
A sequel, The Visitors II: The Corridors of Time followed in 1998, and an American remake, Just Visiting, made with the same stars, was released in 2001. Another sequel, The Visitors: Bastille Day, was released in 2016.

== See also ==
- The Navigator: A Medieval Odyssey
