= Circulez y'a rien à voir =

1983 film

- Directed by: Patrice Leconte
- Screenplay by: Patrice Leconte; Martin Veyron
- Produced by: Christian Fechner
- Starring: Jane Birkin; Michel Blanc; Jacques Villeret
- Cinematography: Robert Fraisse
- Edited by: Joëlle Hache
- Music by: Ramon Pipin; Jean-Philippe Goude
- Distributed by: AMLF
- Release date: 20 April 1983
- Running time: 85 minutes
- Country: France
- Language: French
- Box office: $2.9 million

Circulez y'a rien à voir (lit. 'Move along, nothing to see here', translating roughly as Keep it moving) is a 1983 French comedy film directed by Patrice Leconte, and starring Jane Birkin, Michel Blanc and Jacques Villeret.

== Plot ==
Hélène Duvernet (Jane Birkin), owner of an art gallery, is questioned by police detectives Pelissier (Jacques Villeret) and Leroux (Michel Blanc) for a routine affair. But Leroux becomes infatuated with Hélène, and starts finding any pretext to talk to her or keep an eye on her. He enters her house several times unexpectedly, takes her spinning, and even steels her car so she must pass by the police office. Ironically, Hélène seems to have something to reproach herself, because she does art traffic with her lover Marc. When she leaves for Geneva to sell paintings of Amedeo Modigliani hidden under a paint coating to let think that they are contemporary paintings, she defies Leroux to follow her flight by car, what he does. He finally discovers the truth once arrived in Switzerland, becomes angry at Hélène and suddenly has a pain. While Hélène gives her a cold shower, he kisses her by surprise.

Feeling troubled, he goes back to Paris, but both end by seeing each other at Hélène's house. They discover Marc taking a bath drying his hair. Hélène announces him that Leroux is there and has discovered their traffic. Marc is surprised and is electrocuted in his bathtub with his hairdryer. Hélène and Leaux work as a team to hide Marc's body. They finally throw it from the top a bridge, but it finally falls on a houseboat. Hélène flies alone to Brasil, estimating that she is the only one related to Marc's death. But Leroux realises that a part of his eternal raincoat has been torn and stayed on the corpse of Marc.

== Cast ==
- Michel Blanc as Inspecteur Leroux
- Jane Birkin as Hélène Duvernet
- Jacques Villeret as Inspecteur Pelissier
- Michel Robbe as Marc
- Gaëlle Legrand as Martine, girlfriend of Leroux
- Martin Lamotte as the joking chef
- Dominique Faysse as the housewife
- Luis Rego as Reska
- Alan Adair as Müller
- Wilfrid Durry as the station master
- Marc Adjadj as the hairdresser
- Mathieu Chardet as the customs agent at the Swiss border
- Jean-Paul Lilienfeld as the policeman on the bridge
- Jean-Marc Roulot as the CRS at Roissy Charles de Gaulle Airport
- Jean-Michel Ribes as the bar owner
