= Marche à l'ombre (film) =

- Directed by: Michel Blanc
- Written by: Michel Blanc; Patrick Dewolf
- Produced by: Bernard Artigues; Christian Fechner
- Starring: Gérard Lanvin; Michel Blanc
- Cinematography: Eduardo Serra
- Edited by: Joëlle Hache
- Music by: Jacques Delaporte; Téléphone; Renaud
- Distributed by: Gaumont Distribution
- Release date: 17 October 1984
- Running time: 90 min
- Country: France
- Language: French
- Box office: $16.6 million

Marche à l'ombre is a 1984 French comedy film written and directed by Michel Blanc. The film was the most popular film in France in 1984 with over 6 million admissions.

== Cast ==
- Gérard Lanvin - François
- Michel Blanc - Denis
- Sophie Duez - Mathilde
- Katrine Boorman - Katrina
- Mimi Félixine - Marie-Gabrielle
- Béatrice Camurat - Martine
- Maka Kotto - Joseph
- Jean-François Dérec - Raymond
- Bernard Farcy - Monsieur Christian
- François Berléand - Police Inspector
