= Just Visiting (film) =

2001 film by Jean-Marie Poiré

- Theatrical release poster
- Directed by: Jean-Marie Gaubert
- Screenplay by: Jean-Marie Poiré; Christian Clavier; John Hughes
- Based on: Les Visiteurs by Jean-Marie Poiré; Christian Clavier
- Produced by: Patrice Ledoux; Ricardo Mestres
- Starring: Jean Reno; Christina Applegate; Christian Clavier; Matthew Ross; Tara Reid; Bridgette Wilson-Sampras; Malcolm McDowell
- Narrated by: Kelsey Grammer
- Cinematography: Ueli Steiger
- Edited by: Michael A. Stevenson
- Music by: John Powell
- Production companies: Gaumont; Hollywood Pictures; Hughes Entertainment
- Distributed by: Buena Vista Pictures Distribution (Note: Distributed by Buena Vista Pictures Distribution through the Hollywood Pictures banner.) (United States)
- Release dates: April 6, 2001 (United States); April 11, 2001 (France)
- Running time: 88 minutes
- Countries: United States; France
- Languages: English; French
- Budget: $35 million
- Box office: $16.2 million

Just Visiting is a 2001 action comedy film, starring Jean Reno, Christina Applegate, Christian Clavier, Malcolm McDowell, Tara Reid, and Bridgette Wilson. It follows a medieval knight and his serf who travel to 21st-century Chicago, meeting the knight's descendant. It is a remake of the French film Les Visiteurs (which featured both Reno and Clavier), and both versions are directed by Jean-Marie Gaubert. It was also written by John Hughes, making it the final film he wrote and also the last film to have his name credited.

The film earned around $4.8 million domestically in the U.S. and approximately $11.4 million internationally. Despite a production budget of $35 million, the film did not achieve box office success and fell short of recouping its budget through ticket sales.

== Plot ==
The film takes place in 12th-century England, where Count Thibault Malefète is about to marry Princess Rosalind, the daughter of the reigning King Henry.

At the wedding banquet, an enemy known as the Earl of Warwick accidentally gives Thibault a potion which makes him hallucinate (and which was actually intended for Rosalind by a witch hired by the Earl), and under its influence, he kills his own bride Princess Rosalind believing she is a ferocious monster. While under sentence of death, he asks his servant, André Le Paté to find a wizard to help him. The wizard gives him a potion that will send him back to the moment before he killed Princess Rosalind. The wizard botches the spell, and instead, Thibault and André are sent into the 21st century.

Thibault and André end up in a museum in Chicago where they are arrested by the police after causing much panic, mischief, and chaos. They are rescued by Julia Malefète, a museum employee who closely resembles Princess Rosalind. She thinks that Thibault is her distant French cousin who drowned while yachting a couple of years ago. Thibault soon finds out that Julia is descended from his family and realizes he must return to the 12th century to correct the past.

Julia introduces them to the modern American style of life where norms from medieval times no longer apply. Before they return to his time, Thibault decides to protect Julia from her money-hungry fiance, Hunter Cassidy. Meanwhile, André falls for a gardener, Angelique who presents him with the world of equal rights for all people.

The wizard realizes his mistake and decides to time travel into the future to help Thibault. After he finds him, he successfully prepares a potion to return to the past. André confronts Thibault, telling him he does not want to return to the 12th century, Julia convinces Thibault that he should set him free. Hunter tries to prevent Thibault from interfering with his plans but Julia finds out his real intentions and breaks up with him. Before he leaves, Thibault tells Julia that she will meet a new and better man to marry. Then, he and the wizard drink the potion in the museum and return to the past just before the murder of Princess Rosalind. Thibault offers the tainted wine to the Earl as a peace offering, the latter of whom, not wanting to drink it, jumps out a window to his death. Thibault and Rosalind are then happily reunited. Back in the present, Hunter finds and drinks the remainder of the potion which sends him to the 12th century where he is captured.

Julia decides to reclaim her ancestral castle, much to the firm's delight, and meets a man named Francois Le Combier, who knows a great deal about her family's history. In the last scene, André and Angelique are seen driving in a hot rod towards Las Vegas, and André asks her who would protect him from the Devil. Angelique simply replies "Hey, at least you got me, babe", to which André happily agrees.

== Cast ==
- Jean Reno as Thibault Malefète
- Christina Applegate as Rosalind / Julia Malefète
- Christian Clavier as André le Paté
- Matthew Ross as Hunter Cassidy
- Tara Reid as Angelique
- Bridgette Wilson-Sampras as Amber
- John Aylward as Byron
- George Plimpton as Dr. Brady
- Malcolm McDowell as Wizard
- Sarah Badel as Queen
- Doug Barron as Reed Sikes
- Richard Bremmer as King Henry
- Lorenzo Clemons as Squad Chief
- Oliver Ford Davies as Pit Rivers
- Robert Glenister as Earl of Warwick
- Danny Goldring as Bartender
- Darryl Henriques as Monk
- Michelle Hurst as Pawnshop Broker
- Alexis Loret as François le Combier
- Molly Price as Miss Rodett
- Carl Wright as Station Master
- Kelsey Grammer as Narrator

== Soundtrack ==
Just Visiting

Film score by John Powell
- Released: April 10, 2001
- Recorded: 2001
- Genre: Score
- Length: 36:02
- Label: Varèse Sarabande

No.	Title	Length
1.	"Thibault Goes to England"	2:39
2.	"The Hag's Hut"	2:28
3.	"Rosalind & Thibault"	1:31
4.	"Hallucination and Execution"	1:10
5.	"To Chicago"	0:47
6.	"Kill the Car"	1:59
7.	"Thibault Sees Julia"	1:16
8.	"My Cousin, My Descendant"	1:28
9.	"Ode de Toilet"	0:26
10.	"Tub for Two"	1:03
11.	"So Many Descendants"	0:21
12.	"Kissing Cousins"	0:38
13.	"Searching for a Wizard"	0:50
14.	"Another Visitor"	0:44
15.	"On the Bridge"	1:55
16.	"Feel Like a Lady"	1:04
17.	"André Can't Ask"	0:34
18.	"The Wizard Pulls Himself Together"	1:02
19.	"The Wizard Cooks"	0:39
20.	"André Asks to Stay"	0:57
21.	"Not a Bunny"	1:04
22.	"The Big Chase"	2:01
23.	"What Will I Do Without You"	1:45
24.	"Thibault and the Wizard Return Home"	1:52
25.	"In the Icehall"	1:08
26.	"Hunter Gets It / Julia Sees the Castle"	1:43
27.	"Your Time Will Come" (performed by Kudson Kai)	2:56
Total length:		36:02

== Home media ==
The film was released on VHS and DVD on September 11, 2001.

== Box office ==
The film opened at No. 12 at the North American box office making $2,272,489 USD in its opening weekend.

== Reception ==
The film received generally negative reviews. Review aggregator Rotten Tomatoes gave the film a score of 33% based on reviews from 79 critics, with an average rating of 4.8/10. The site's consensus reads: "This remake of the French comedy Les Visiteurs ends up being a middling, forgettable effort -- not as good as the original". On Metacritic, the film holds a weighted average score of 38 out of 100 based on 25 critics, indicating "generally unfavorable" reviews. Audiences polled by CinemaScore gave the film an average grade of "A−" on an A+ to F scale.
