= Jean Reno =

French and Spanish actor (born 1948)

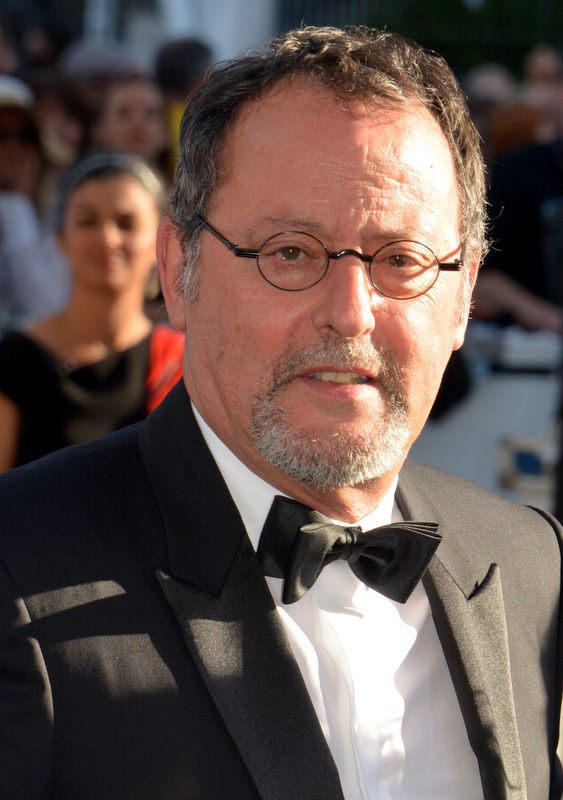
- Reno at the 2016 Cannes Film Festival
- Born: Juan Moreno y Herrera-Jiménez; 30 July 1948 (age 78); Casablanca, Morocco
- Citizenship: France; Spain
- Occupation: Actor
- Years active: 1977–present
- Spouses: Geneviève Reno (m. 1977; div. 1995); Nathalie Dyszkiewicz (m. 1996; div. 2001); Zofia Borucka (m. 2006)
- Children: 6

Signature
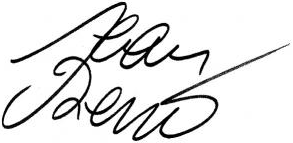

Juan Moreno y Herrera-Jiménez (born 30 July 1948), commonly known as Jean Reno (French: [ʒɑ̃ ʁeno]), is a French and Spanish actor. He established himself as a leading man of French cinema through his collaborations with director Luc Besson, and has worked in numerous international productions. He is a three-time César Award nominee - Best Actor for Les Visiteurs (1993) and Léon: The Professional (1994), and Best Supporting Actor for The Big Blue (1988).

Reno's other notable films include Le Dernier Combat (1983), La Femme Nikita (1990), Mission: Impossible (1996), Ronin (1998), Godzilla (1998), Crimson Rivers (2000), Wasabi (2001), The Pink Panther (2006), The Da Vinci Code (2006), Flushed Away (2006), Hector and the Search for Happiness (2014), The Promise (2016), and Da 5 Bloods (2020).

== Early life ==
Reno was born Juan Moreno y Herrera-Jiménez, on 30 July 1948 in Casablanca, French Morocco. His parents were Spanish, natives of Sanlúcar de Barrameda and Jerez de la Frontera in Andalusia. They had moved to North Africa to find work and escape Francoist Spain. Reno has a younger sister named María Teresa ("Maite"). Their father was a linotypist. Their mother died when he was a teenager.

At the age of 17, Reno and his family moved to France, where he studied acting at the Cours Simon School of Drama in Paris. Reno also served in the French Army, as his military service became mandatory once his family had gained French citizenship.

Reno learned Spanish from his parents, and French growing up in Morocco.

== Career ==
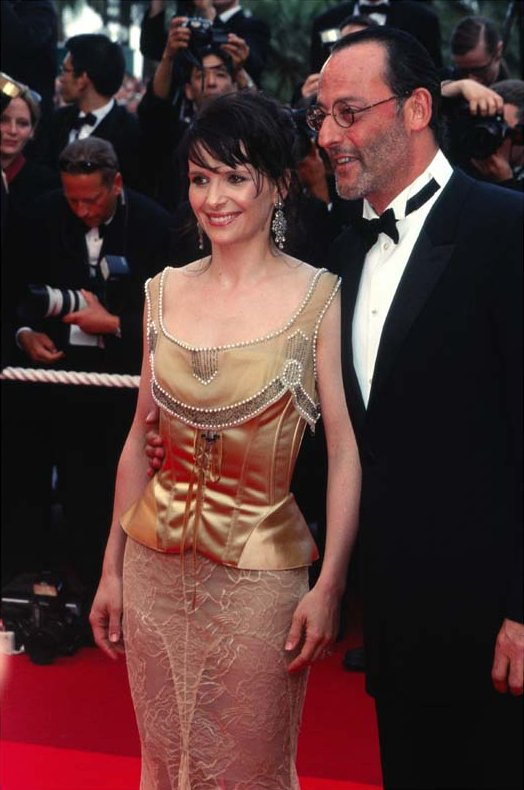
Jean Reno and Juliette Binoche at Cannes Film Festival in 2002

After he started to get acting jobs in France, Juan adopted the French version of his name, Jean, and shortened his surname to Reno. Due to his large frame (1.88 m or 6 ft 2 in), Reno was called on to play "heavies" in his early career. He later appeared in romantic comedies and action films. He began his film career in France, appearing in many films by director Luc Besson, including his early Le Dernier Combat (1983). The two have continued to work together, collaborating in films produced, written, or directed by Besson. Of their joint work, those that have achieved the most critical and commercial success include: La Femme Nikita (1990), and the English-language films The Big Blue (1988) and Léon: The Professional (1994).

Reno did the voice-over for Mufasa in the French-language version of The Lion King, a role originally performed in English by James Earl Jones. Reno has starred in such high-profile American films as French Kiss (1995) with Meg Ryan and Kevin Kline, Mission: Impossible (1996) with Tom Cruise, Ronin (1998) with Robert De Niro, and Godzilla (1998) with Matthew Broderick. Reno turned down the role of Agent Smith in The Matrix. He also acted in French productions: Les Visiteurs (1993) (which was remade in English as Just Visiting in 2001); The Crimson Rivers (2000), and Jet Lag (Décalage Horaire) by Danièle Thompson (2002), which was also a box-office success in France.

In 2006, Reno had a prominent role in The Pink Panther 2006 remake and its sequel The Pink Panther 2, playing Gilbert Ponton, opposite Steve Martin as Inspector Clouseau. He portrayed Captain Bezu Fache in the Ron Howard film The Da Vinci Code. Among his most successful films are Les Visiteurs and L'Enquète corse.

In other media, Reno was involved in the production of the third installment in the popular Capcom series Onimusha (Onimusha 3: Demon Siege), lending his likeness to the protagonist Jacques Blanc, as well as providing the voice for the character's French dialogue. In advertising work, Reno has appeared in American television commercials for UPS and portrayed Doraemon in a series of Toyota ads in Japan, as part of the "ReBorn" campaign. He also starred as Jo in the 2013 English-language TV series Jo.

In 2024, Reno released his first novel, Emma. He published a sequel titled L'Évasion in 2026, which was inspired by the abductions of Ukrainian children during the Russo-Ukrainian war; although based on real events, Reno stressed the story is apolitical.

== Personal life ==
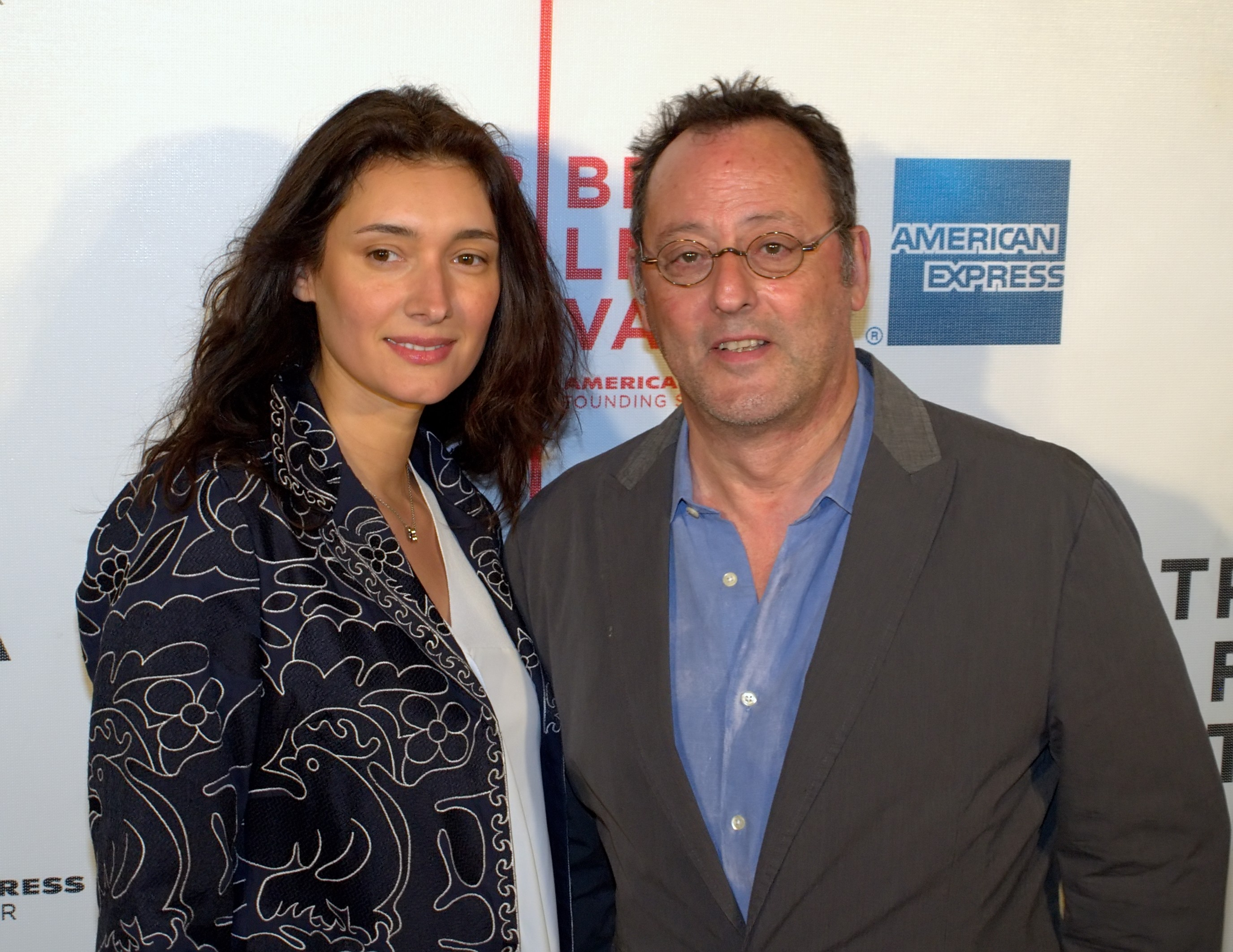
Reno with his wife Zofia Borucka at the 2010 Tribeca Film Festival

Reno married his first wife, Geneviève, in 1977; they divorced in 1988. Reno married his second wife, Polish model Nathalie Dyszkiewicz, in 1995. They divorced in 2001. On 29 July 2006, Reno married for the third time, to a British model and actress of Polish descent, Zofia Borucka, at the Les Baux-de-Provence city hall. The presidential candidate Nicolas Sarkozy served as his best man (Reno endorsed Sarkozy for the 2007 French presidential election). Reno has six children, two from each marriage.

Reno maintains three homes in Paris, Malaysia, and Los Angeles. He is a dual citizen of France and Spain. In a 2016 interview, Reno stated "his roots are above all Spanish, Andalusian."

== Filmography ==
=== Film ===
Year	Title	Role	Notes
1978	The Hypothesis of the Stolen Painting	Tableaux Personnel	
1979	Womanlight	Traffic policeman	
1980	The Moroccan Stallion		
1982	The Passerby	Angry Man	
1983	Signes extérieurs de richesse	Marc Letellier	
1983	Le Dernier Combat	The Brute	
1985	Le téléphone sonne toujours deux fois!!	Conman	
1985	Subway	The Drummer	
1986	I Love You	Dentist	
1988	The Big Blue	Enzo Molinari	
1990	La Femme Nikita	Victor	
1991	L'Homme au masque d'or	Father Victorio Gaetano	
1991	Loulou Graffiti	Pique la Lune	
1991	L'Opération Corned-Beef	Captain Philippe Boulier	
1992	Porco Rosso	Marco "Porco Rosso" Pagot (voice)	French dub
1993	Les Visiteurs	Godefroy de Papincourt, Comte de Montmirail	
1993	La Vis	Monsieur K	
1993	Paranoïa		Short subject
1993	Homeward Bound: The Incredible Journey	Shadow (voice)	French dub
1994	The Lion King	Mufasa (voice)	French dub
1994	Léon: The Professional	Leone "Léon" Montana	
1995	Les Truffes	Patrick	
1995	French Kiss	Inspector Jean-Paul Cardon	
1995	Al di là delle nuvole	Carlo	
1996	Mission: Impossible	Franz Krieger	
1996	Le Jaguar	Jean Campana	
1997	Roseanna's Grave	Marcello	
1997	Un amour de sorcière	Molok	
1997	Les Sœurs Soleil	Spectator	
1998	Les Visiteurs II: Les Couloirs du temps	Comte Godefroy de Montmirail, dit Godefroy	
1998	Godzilla	Philippe Roaché	
1998	Ronin	Vincent	
1999	The Book That Wrote Itself	Himself	
2000	Crimson Rivers	Pierre Niemans	
2001	Just Visiting	Count Thibault of Malfete	
2001	Atlantis: The Lost Empire	Vincenzo "Vinny" Santorini (voice)	French dub
2001	Wasabi	Hubert Fiorentini	
2002	Décalage horaire	Felix	
2002	Rollerball	Alexis Petrovich	
2003	Tais-toi!	Ruby	
2004	Crimson Rivers II: Angels of the Apocalypse	Commissaire Niemans	
2004	Hotel Rwanda	Mr. Tillens	Uncredited
2004	The Corsican Files	Ange Leoni	
2005	L'Empire des loups	Jean-Louis Schiffer	
2005	The Tiger and the Snow	Fuad	
2006	The Pink Panther	Gilbert Ponton	
2006	Flyboys	Captain Thenault	
2006	The Da Vinci Code	Captain Bezu Fache	
2006	Flushed Away	Le Frog (voice)	Also French dub
2008	Ca$h	Maxime - Dubreuil	
2009	The Pink Panther 2	Gilbert Ponton	
2009	Le Premier Cercle	Milo Malakian	
2009	Couples Retreat	Marcel	
2009	Armored	Quinn	
2010	The Round Up	Dr. Sheinbaum	
2010	The Philosopher	Baggio	
2010	22 Bullets	Charly Matteï	
2011	Zookeeper	Bernie the Gorilla (voice)	French dub
2011	You Don't Choose Your Family	Docteur Luix	
2011	Margaret	Ramon	
2012	Alex Cross	Giles Mercier	
2012	The Chef	Alexandre Lagarde	
2012	The Day of the Crows	Le père Courge	
2013	Days and Nights	Louis	
2014	My Summer in Provence	Paul	
2014	Hector and the Search for Happiness	Dr. Diego Baresco	
2014	Benoît Brisefer: Les Taxis rouges	Poilonez	
2015	The Squad	Serge Buren	
2015	Brothers of the Wind	Danzer	
2016	The Last Face	Dr. Mehmet Love	
2016	The Visitors: Bastille Day	Comte Godefroy de Montmirail	
2016	The Promise	Admiral Louis Dartige Fournet	
2017	Mes trésors	Patrick	
2017	The Girl in the Fog	Augusto Flores	
2017	The Adventurers	Pierre	
2019	4 Latas	Jean Pierre	
2019	Cold Blood	Henry	
2019	The Lion King	Mufasa (voice)	French dub
2019	Polina and the Mystery of a Film Studio	Screen Hologram	
2020	Waiting for Anya	Henri	
2020	Da 5 Bloods	Desroche	
2020	Rogue City	Ange Leonetti	
2020	The Doorman	Victor Dubois	
2021	Promises	Grandpa	
2024	Lift	Lars Jorgenson	
2024	My Penguin Friend	João	
2024	Family Pack	Gilbert Vassier	
2025	Tuner	Marius Maissner	
2025	Zootopia 2	Chèvre, Bushron (voices)	Cameos Also French dub
TBA	The Florist		Post-production

=== Television ===
Year	Title	Role	Notes
1993	Flight from Justice	Charlie Bert	TV movie
2013	Jo	Joachim "Jo" St-Clair	8 episodes
2021	Who Killed Sara?	Reinaldo Gómez de la Cortina	7 episodes
2022	A Private Affair	Héctor Hugo	8 episodes

=== Video games ===
Year	Title	Role	Notes
2004	Onimusha 3: Demon Siege	Jacques Blanc	Voice and likeness

== Stage credits ==
- Prends bien garde aux zeppelins (1977)
- Ecce Homo (1978)
- Celimare le bien-aimé (1978)
- Je romps et ne plie pas (1979)
- Société Un (1979)
- La Manufacture (1981)
- Terre étrangère (1984)
- Andromaque (1989)
- Montserrat (1991)
- Les Grandes Occasions (2006)
- Nos femmes (2015)

== Awards and nominations ==
Institution	Year	Category	Work	Result
César Award	1989	Best Supporting Actor	The Big Blue	Nominated
César Award	1994	Best Actor	Les Visiteurs	Nominated
César Award	1995	Best Actor	Léon: The Professional	Nominated
European Film Award	2000	Outstanding European Achievement in World Cinema	—N/a	Honored
Giffoni Film Festival	2012	François Truffaut Award	—N/a	Honored
Screen Actors Guild Award	2021	Outstanding Performance by a Cast in a Motion Picture	Da 5 Bloods	Nominated

== Honours ==
- 2003 Officer of the National Order of Merit
- 2007 Officer of the Order of Arts and Letters
- 2015 Gold Medal of Merit in the Fine Arts
- 2024 Commander of the Legion of Honor
