= Gaspard Ulliel =

French actor (1984–2022)

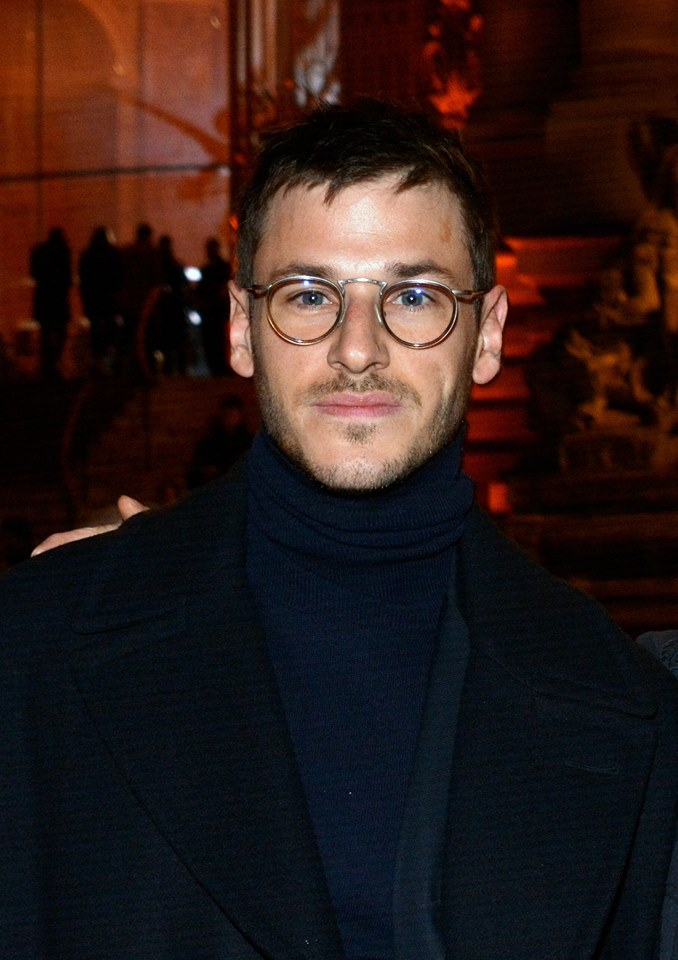
- Ulliel in 2018
- Born: Gaspard Thomas Ulliel; 25 November 1984; Neuilly-sur-Seine, Hauts-de-Seine, France
- Died: 19 January 2022 (aged 37); La Tronche, Isère, France
- Resting place: Père Lachaise Cemetery, Paris
- Education: University of Saint-Denis
- Occupation: Actor
- Years active: 1997–2022
- Partner: Gaëlle Pietri (2013–2020)
- Children: 1
- Awards: Full list

Gaspard Thomas Ulliel (French pronunciation: [ɡaspaʁ tɔmɑ yljɛl]; 25 November 1984 – 19 January 2022) was a French actor and model. He was known for having portrayed the young Hannibal Lecter in Hannibal Rising (2007), fashion designer Yves Saint Laurent in the biopic Saint Laurent (2014), and for being the face of Chanel men's fragrance Bleu de Chanel for twelve years. He also voiced Jack Frost in the French version of Rise of the Guardians (2012) and portrayed Anton Mogart in the Disney+ miniseries Moon Knight (2022).

Ulliel made his feature film debut in Brotherhood of the Wolf (2001) and had his breakthrough in Strayed (2003). He was nominated for the César Award for Most Promising Actor for three consecutive years for his performances in Summer Things (2002), Strayed (2003), and A Very Long Engagement (2004)—winning in 2005 for A Very Long Engagement as the World War I soldier Manech. In 2015 he earned his first César nomination for Best Actor for Saint Laurent. In 2017 he won the César Award for Best Actor for his role as a terminally ill playwright in It's Only the End of the World (2016). He became a Knight of the Order of Arts and Letters in France in 2015.

His other notable works include The Last Day (2004), Paris, je t'aime (2006), Jacquou le Croquant (2007), The Princess of Montpensier (2010), To the Ends of the World (2018), Sibyl (2019), and Twice Upon a Time (2019).

Ulliel died on 19 January 2022 at the age of 37 following a skiing accident at La Rosière resort in Savoie, France.

== Early life ==
Ulliel was born in the Paris suburb of Neuilly-sur-Seine, the only child to Christine, a stylist and runway show producer, and Serge Ulliel, a fashion designer. His great-grandfather, Raoul Ulliel (1889–1943), was a bronzesmith. His paternal grandmother was of Italian and Spanish descent.

He had a scar on his left cheek as a result of a doberman attacking him with its claws when, at the age of six, he attempted to ride the dog like a horse. He once quipped that the scar increased his emotional acting abilities because it looked like a dimple. His obituary in the French newspaper Libération described him as having the "most famous scar in French cinema".

Ulliel attended the bilingual school École Jeannine Manuel in Paris where he learned English.

Ulliel wanted to be a jazz musician and even tried playing the saxophone for a couple of years, but he quit because he thought he wasn't talented. He also learned how to play the piano and was interested in architecture and photography.

He dreamed of becoming a film director and attended the University of Saint-Denis in Paris, where he studied cinema for two years until he quit to focus on his acting career.

== Career ==
=== Early work and breakthrough (1997–2003) ===
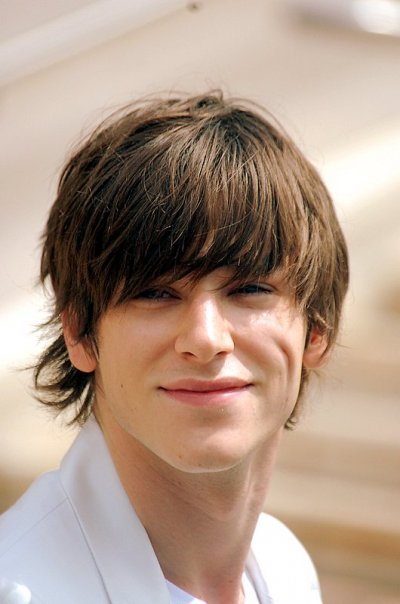
Ulliel at the 2006 Cannes Film Festival

While he was still at school, Ulliel began acting at the age of eleven when a friend of his mother's friend was working at an agency and looking for young actors. She asked Ulliel if he wanted to give it a try and he said yes, but just for fun. It was only after he turned seventeen that he really decided to continue working in the industry. He left the University of Saint-Denis after two years because he was getting more offers as an actor, but he still dreamed of writing and directing his own film, stating in a 2011 interview for Anthem Magazine: "I wake up every morning with this idea stuck in my mind that I want to write and direct my own film one day. As I work more and more on different sets, I see how hard it is to be a director. It's insane the amount of work and confidence that goes into it. I’m so respectful of filmmakers and I admire what they do. I hope that one day I'll find the right subject and the confidence to try it. I'm still young."

He made his acting debut with a small part in one episode of Une femme en blanc, a 1997 miniseries for French television starring Sandrine Bonnaire. He continued appearing in made-for-television films and TV series during the late 1990s and early 2000s and then became known as a film actor in France.

In 2001 Ulliel made his feature film debut with a minor role in Christophe Gans's Brotherhood of the Wolf alongside Vincent Cassel and Monica Bellucci.

In 2002 Ulliel played the role of Loic in Michel Blanc's romantic comedy-drama film Summer Things, for which he earned his first César Award nomination for Most Promising Actor and won the Lumière Award for Most Promising Actor.

He also performed at the drama school Cours Florent, where he was discovered by director André Téchiné, who cast him in the lead role of his World War II drama Strayed in 2003, starring opposite Emmanuelle Béart as a mysterious teenager who protects her family. For this breakthrough performance Ulliel was nominated for a César Award for Most Promising Actor, and he won the Étoiles d'Or for Best Male Newcomer.

=== A Very Long Engagement, English-language films and stage debut (2004–2012) ===
Ulliel had his first English-speaking role in Peter Greenaway's 2004 film The Tulse Luper Suitcases, Part 2: Vaux to the Sea, in which he played a French man named Leon.

In 2004 he starred in Jean-Pierre Jeunet's World War I drama A Very Long Engagement, co-starring with Audrey Tautou and Marion Cotillard. For this he won a César Award for Most Promising Actor as soldier Manech Langonnet, the fiancé of Tautou's character Mathilde. Manech disappears in the trenches in 1917, but Mathilde refuses to believe that he is dead and starts investigating what happened to him. That same year, he also starred in Rodolphe Marconi's drama The Last Day, opposite Mélanie Laurent and Nicole Garcia.

In 2005 Ulliel played Izik in Richard Dembo's World War II drama Nina's House.

In 2006 he appeared opposite Marianne Faithfull and Elias McConnell in Gus Van Sant's segment ("Le Marais") in the anthology film Paris, je t'aime, in which he played Gaspard, a young gay man flirting with a male print shop worker (McConnell).

In 2007 Ulliel portrayed the title role of the young Hannibal Lecter in Hannibal Rising, his first major English-language film. He also played the title role in Laurent Boutonnat's historical film Jacquou le Croquant, based on the 1899 novel by Eugène Le Roy about a peasant who leads a revolt against the Count of Nansac.

In 2008 he starred as François, a scientist researching black holes in the sci-fi film The Third Part of the World, directed by Eric Forestier. He also starred as Joseph, the son of Isabelle Huppert's character in Rithy Panh's drama The Sea Wall, based on the 1950 novel of the same name by Marguerite Duras.

In 2009 Ulliel starred opposite Jean Reno in the thriller Inside Ring (also known as Ultimate Heist), directed by Laurent Tuel. He also portrayed the angel Xas in Niki Caro's English-language romantic drama film The Vintner's Luck, based on the 1998 novel The Vintner's Luck by Elizabeth Knox, with Jérémie Renier, Vera Farmiga, and Keisha Castle-Hughes. Later that year he starred as Nathanaël in Alain Tasma's drama Ultimatum, set in 1990's Israel during the Gulf War.

In 2010 he portrayed Henry I, Duke of Guise, in Bertrand Tavernier's romance film The Princess of Montpensier, based on the 1662 novel of the same name by Madame de La Fayette. The following year he played William in Emmanuel Mouret's comedy film The Art of Love.

In 2012 Ulliel made his stage debut as the lead in Que faire de Mister Sloane?, an adaptation of English author Joe Orton's 1963 play Entertaining Mr. Sloane directed by Michel Fau at the Théâtre des Champs-Élysées in Paris. He then voiced Jack Frost in the French version of the animated film Rise of the Guardians and played Balthazar, one of the four sons of Nicole Garcia's character, in Brigitte Roüan's comedy film A Greek Type of Problem.

=== Saint Laurent and It's Only the End of the World (2014–2019) ===
He portrayed French fashion designer Yves Saint Laurent in the 2014 biographical film Saint Laurent, directed by Bertrand Bonello, which earned him a Lumière Award for Best Actor and nominations for the César and the Globe de Cristal for Best Actor.

In December 2014 Ulliel was a member of the jury of the Cinecoles Short Film section at the 14th Marrakech International Film Festival.

In 2015 Ulliel starred as Tomas in an adaptation of Lars Norén's play Démons, directed by Marcial Di Fonzo Bo, at the Théâtre du Rond-Point in Paris.

In 2016 he appeared in two films: Xavier Dolan's It's Only the End of the World as Louis, a playwright who returns home after twelve years to tell his family that he's dying, with Marion Cotillard, Vincent Cassel, Léa Seydoux, and Nathalie Baye; and in Stéphanie Di Giusto's The Dancer, an unconventional biopic of American dancer Loie Fuller, in which Ulliel portrayed Count Louis d'Orsay.

In 2017 he was nominated for the Jury Prize for Best Actor at the Riviera International Film Festival for It's Only the End of the World alongside co-star Vincent Cassel. Ulliel won his second César Award, this time for Best Actor, for his performance in the film and also received his second nomination for Best Actor for both the Lumière Awards and the Globe de Cristal awards (with Cassel also nominated for the latter).

In 2018 he co-starred with Isabelle Huppert in Benoît Jacquot's drama Eva, adapted from the 1945 novel Eve by James Hadley Chase. That same year, he voiced British poet Percy Bysshe Shelley in Le Brasier Shelley, a pictureless film in 3D sound. He also starred in Guillaume Nicloux's First Indochina War drama To the Ends of the World as French soldier Robert Tassen opposite Gérard Depardieu; F. J. Ossang's science-fiction film 9 Fingers; and Pierre Schoeller's French Revolution film One Nation, One King with Louis Garrel, Niels Schneider, and Adèle Haenel.

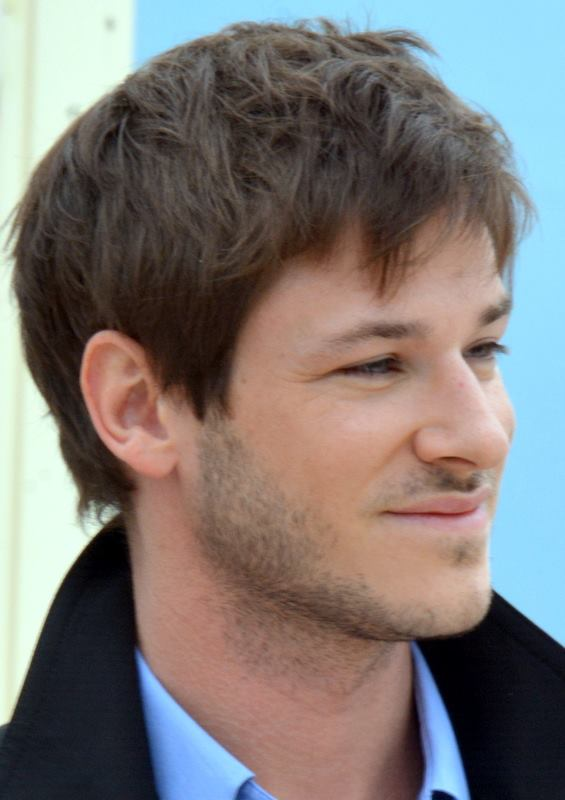
Ulliel at the 2016 Cannes Film Festival

In 2019 he portrayed actor Igor Maleski in Justine Triet's comedy-drama film Sibyl. He also played the lead role in the Arte/Netflix's time-travel miniseries Twice Upon a Time, directed by Guillaume Nicloux, as Vincent Dauda, a man who mistakenly gets delivered a mysterious wooden box that allows him to travel back in time to save his relationship with his ex-girlfriend, portrayed by Freya Mavor.

In 2007 and 2019 Ulliel was a member of the jury for the Deauville American Film Festival in France.

=== Final roles and unfinished projects (2021–2022) ===
In January 2021 he was a jury member at the Gérardmer Fantasy Film Festival in France.

Between April and May 2021 Ulliel filmed Alex Lutz and Arthur Sanigou's La Vengeance au Triple Galop, a comedy TV film for France's Canal Plus (and a parody of the 1983 Australian TV series Return to Eden), where he appeared as plastic surgeon Danley Marchal-Widkins opposite Marion Cotillard and Audrey Lamy. This was Ulliel's last film to be released during his lifetime, and it was broadcast by Canal Plus on 4 October 2021.

In June 2021 Ulliel finished shooting his penultimate film (and his last live-action) More Than Ever, directed by Emily Atef, which made its world premiere at the Cannes Film Festival on 21 May 2022.

In July 2021 Ulliel joined the cast of the Disney+ streaming superhero miniseries Moon Knight, set in the Marvel Cinematic Universe and released on 30 March 2022. He portrayed the villain Anton Mogart / Midnight Man opposite Oscar Isaac, Ethan Hawke, and May Calamawy, guest-starring in the episode "The Friendly Type".

Ulliel voiced the doll Scott in Bertrand Bonello's hybrid live-action and animation film Coma, which had its world premiere at the Berlin Film Festival and competed in the Encounters section on 12 February 2022, marking it as the first film released after Ulliel's death. Bonello said on 24 December 2021 that he had just finished filming Coma, which makes it the last film that Ulliel shot, but Ulliel's participation was kept a secret until it was selected for the Berlin Film Festival in February 2022. He was also set to collaborate for the third time with Bonello in the science-fiction film The Beast, co-starring with Léa Seydoux. Shooting was scheduled to start in April 2022.

In December 2021 Ulliel started shooting Of Money and Blood, a Canal Plus crime thriller miniseries about the carbon tax fraud where he would play a character inspired by French businessman Arnaud Mimran. In January 2022 Ulliel was on a break from shooting Of Money and Blood when he died after a skiing accident. The production, which was directed by Xavier Giannoli, still had 84 more days of shooting. Ulliel had been expected to return to the set on 24 January. On 18 February 2022 Canal Plus confirmed to France's Le HuffPost that actor Niels Schneider would replace Ulliel in the miniseries. Ulliel and Schneider were friends and co-stars in the films One Nation, One King (2018) and Sibyl (2019).

== Other endeavours ==
In 2003, at the age of 19, Ulliel walked the runway for the first and only time for Hedi Slimane's Dior Homme Autumn/Winter 2003 fashion show entitled "Luster".

In 2007, Ulliel appeared on the cover of the February issue of French Vogue with supermodel Doutzen Kroes.

In 2008, Ulliel was the face of Longchamp, a French leather and luxury goods company, along with Kate Moss.

=== Bleu de Chanel campaigns ===
Ulliel was announced as the face for Chanel new men's fragrance, Bleu de Chanel, on 16 February 2010, making him Chanel's first male ambassador. His first television commercial for the campaign was directed by Martin Scorsese, filmed in New York City and debuted on 25 August 2010.

Ulliel's second commercial for Bleu de Chanel was directed by James Gray and released on 5 February 2015. It was filmed in Los Angeles and featured Jimi Hendrix's cover of Bob Dylan's "All Along the Watchtower".

In 2016, Ulliel became the face of Chanel's first men's watch, Monsieur de Chanel.

His third commercial for Bleu de Chanel was released on 1 June 2018 and was directed by Steve McQueen. Shot in Bangkok and London, it featured Ulliel crossing the city looking for a woman while David Bowie's "Starman" plays in the background.

In June 2020, Ulliel narrated the last episode of the "Chanel Parfumeur" series, I Am a Fragrance Trail, in both French and English.

Ulliel was the face of Bleu de Chanel for twelve years. His last campaign for the fragrance was released on 8 December 2020. Upon his death, Chanel released a statement on their official Instagram and Facebook accounts paying tribute to him. Chanel also paid tribute to Ulliel during their Spring/Summer 2022 Haute Couture show at Paris Fashion Week on 25 January 2022. A model dressed as a bride finished the show by holding a bouquet of camellias—Coco Chanel's favorite flower—tinted midnight blue as a nod to Ulliel and the Bleu de Chanel perfume.

== In the media ==
Ulliel's androgynous look in films such as 2003's Strayed, 2006's Paris, je t'aime, and his performance as Yves Saint Laurent in the 2014 film Saint Laurent, turned him into a gay icon.

In January 2007, Ulliel was included on The Washington Post's "What's In and Out for 2007" list in the "In" category.

In June 2007, Ulliel was ranked No. 12 on France's Elle magazine's "15 Sexiest Men" poll.

On season 4, episode 5 of Call My Agent!, Sigourney Weaver (playing herself) wants Ulliel to be cast as the male lead in her upcoming film.

On 24 January 2022, he jumped from No. 8979 to No. 1 on IMDb's STARMeter chart based on page views following his death.

== Personal life ==
Ulliel dated French actress and singer Cécile Cassel (the younger sister of Vincent Cassel) from 2005 to 2007, and Chanel's then-International VIP relations officer, Jordane Crantelle, from 2008 to 2011. He was in a relationship with French model and singer Gaëlle Pietri from 2013 to 2020, with whom he had a son, born in January 2016.

In July 2015, he was made a Chevalier ("Knight") of the Order of Arts and Letters in France.

=== Philanthropy and environmentalism ===
In 2012, Ulliel supported the charity campaign "Juste Un Coeur" ("Just One Heart") by choosing a blue T-shirt whose sales were donated to UNICEF's Action Against Hunger. That same year, he donated the coat he had worn in the 2010 Bleu de Chanel commercial to be auctioned off for the "Vestiaire Solidaire" ("Solidarity Closet") campaign in support of the French Telethon and the French Muscular Dystrophy Association (AFM).

In 2015, Ulliel signed The Calais Appeal, which asked the French government for an emergency plan to end the undignified living conditions that migrants and refugees were facing in the Calais Jungle. In August 2018, he signed a petition supporting Aquarius, the humanitarian ship chartered by the European sea rescue organization SOS Méditerranée and carried out in partnership with Doctors Without Borders, demanding the ship to be allowed to return to the sea and continue to rescue people in mortal danger in international waters after being prevented from saving refugees and turned back from the rescue zone off the coast of Libya in June 2018. In November 2018, he signed French magazine L'Express's petition against homophobic attacks.

In 2020, he was one of the signatories of the tribune "Académie des Césars : nous n'avons aucune voix au chapitre" ("César Academy: we have no voice in the matter"), published on 10 February 2020 on the website of the French newspaper Le Monde asking for an in-depth reform of the César Awards Academy to remedy its "elitist and closed" functioning. In March 2021, he signed the petition of France's Society of Film Directors (SRF) entitled "Un jour sans fin" ("An Endless Day"), asking President Emmanuel Macron to reopen theaters in France following a decision to close them in 2020 due to the COVID-19 pandemic.

Ulliel was an environmentalist and committed to planetary health. He said in a 2019 interview for Madame Figaro that he was trying to fly less frequently for the sake of the environment, "but only action by governments will really make a difference." In 2019, he signed the petition "Résister et créer" ("Resist and Create"), created by the movement On Est Prêt along with Cyril Dion to challenge the world of cinema at a time of mobilizations for the climate, and also narrated the campaign "Nos objets ont plein d'avenirs" ("Our objects have plenty of future"), designed by DDB Paris for Ademe and the Ministry of Ecological and Solidarity Transition, which highlights all the actions to be taken to extend the life of objects and help preserve the planet's resources and reduce the production of waste.

While supporting the Monte-Carlo Gala for Planetary Health in September 2021, he said: "We are facing an unprecedented ecological crisis. Never before has our planet and life on earth been so threatened. [...] I want to be part of those fighting to leave a healthy planet for our future generations. Let's see this as a hopeful wake-up call. It is still within our reach, but not for long - we have entered this highly decisive period. Today, there are no more important concerns or priorities to address."

== Death ==
On 18 January 2022 at around 4:00 pm, Ulliel was critically injured while skiing at the resort of La Rosière in Savoie, France, when he collided with another skier at an intersection between two blue/intermediate slopes after turning left, presumably to join his friends on an adjoining slope, and suffered serious brain trauma. Ulliel was airlifted by helicopter to the trauma unit of the Centre Hospitalier Universitaire Grenoble Alpes in nearby La Tronche, where he died the following day around 4:00 p.m. at the age of 37. According to French magazine Paris Match, Ulliel arrived brain dead at the hospital. Ulliel's parents along with his last partner, Gäelle Pietri, decided to donate his organs, saving the lives of six people.

An investigation indicated that both skiers fell to the ground after the collision, and that Ulliel was motionless and unconscious when rescuers arrived. La Rosière's director, Jean Regaldo, told France's BFM TV that Ulliel was not wearing a helmet when rescuers arrived. Helmets are not required on French ski slopes. Regaldo also said weather conditions were "perfect" at the time of the accident and that there were no rocks in the area of the collision, which he described as easily accessible. The other skier, a Lithuanian man in his forties, was wearing a helmet and was not injured. He told the investigators that the collision was not too violent.

Upon hearing the Lithuanian skier and other eyewitnesses of the accident, the public prosecutor of Albertville, Anne Gaches, stated that wearing a helmet "would not necessarily have changed things", and that "it was not noted excessive speed, inappropriate behavior or fault of one of the two skiers". Following their testimonies, the prosecutor also declared that the two skiers were moving side by side when they collided. "For the moment, it is difficult to say whether it was the shock or the fall that led to Mr. Ulliel's death", she said. Gaches also stated that no autopsy would be performed on Ulliel's body. The resort offered psychological support for both the Lithuanian skier, who was very shocked, and for Ulliel's friends and relatives. Ulliel was on vacation at the resort with his friends.

On 27 January 2022, a memorial service for Ulliel was held at the Church of St. Eustache in Paris. It was attended by nearly a thousand people, including his family, friends and co-stars such as Audrey Tautou, Marion Cotillard, Louis Garrel, Jérémie Rénier (who also acted as a pallbearer), Isabelle Huppert, Vincent Lindon, Niels Schneider, Nathalie Baye, Léa Seydoux and Vincent Cassel. He was buried in a private ceremony at the Père Lachaise Cemetery in Paris. The resort, La Rosière, also paid tribute to Ulliel by stopping the ski lifts for one minute at 3:58 pm, the time of his accident on 18 January.

On 18 January 2023, a year after the accident, Albertville's public prosecutor, Anne Gaches, announced to French radio station RTL that the investigation on the accident had been officially closed with no further action several months before. Justice has officially cleared the Lithuanian skier of all responsibilities and he will not be subjected to any prosecution.

=== Tributes ===
Among those who paid tribute to Ulliel following his death were France's president Emmanuel Macron, who described Ulliel as "an icon of French elegance who dazzled the cameras", France's Prime Minister Jean Castex, and France's Culture Minister Roselyne Bachelot, as well as peers and collaborators such as Xavier Dolan, Martin Scorsese, Marion Cotillard, Isabelle Huppert, Juliette Binoche, Chanel, Disney, Cannes Film Festival director Thierry Fremaux, Cannes Film Festival president Pierre Lescure, Jean Dujardin, Peter Webber, Pierre Niney, Louis Garrel, André Téchiné, and Bertrand Bonello.

On 25 February 2022, the 47th César Awards ceremony opened with a tribute video to Ulliel featuring his last scene in the 2016 film It's Only the End of the World, and a message on the screen that read "this ceremony is dedicated to Gaspard Ulliel". Later in the evening, Xavier Dolan, who directed Ulliel in It's Only the End of the World, paid a tribute to him in the form of a letter addressed to Ulliel's mother, which he finished by saying "Because a mother's love is stronger than anything. I believe it. Stronger than life. Stronger than art itself. And certainly stronger than death." Dolan's speech was followed by the ceremony's "In Memoriam" segment, which also began with a tribute to Ulliel featuring scenes from the films A Very Long Engagement and Saint Laurent.

On 27 February 2022, Ulliel was honored in the "In Memoriam" segment from the 28th SAG Awards ceremony, which featured his last scene in A Very Long Engagement. Despite not being mentioned during the Oscars' In Memoriam segment on 27 March 2022, Ulliel was included in the online memorial from the official website of the Academy of Motion Picture Arts and Sciences among other artists who had died recently.

On 13 April 2022, that week's episode of the Marvel Studios miniseries Moon Knight, which featured Ulliel guest starring in the role of Anton Mogart, was dedicated to his memory with a tribute in the end credits. Marvel Studios also shared a tribute to Ulliel on their social media.

Ulliel's last partner, Gaëlle Pietri, wrote a book paying tribute to him titled Le Temps de te dire adieu ("Time to Say Goodbye"), published on 26 April 2023.

Bertrand Bonello dedicated the film The Beast to Ulliel, who was originally set to play the part of Louis in the film.

=== Aftermath ===
Following Ulliel's death, politicians and ski professionals urged for helmets to be made obligatory on the French slopes. Jean-Marc Peillex, the mayor of Saint-Gervais-les-Bains in Haute-Savoie, stated that they must impose helmet-wearing to reduce the risk of serious accidents and also reexamine on a case-by-case basis the dangerousness of different pistes and potentially reclassify their colors. When asked if helmets should be made compulsory for skiing in France – like they are in other European countries – during a press conference on 20 January 2022, government spokesperson Gabriel Attal said that it was "not the moment to begin a debate around the subject." It was reported that 97% of children under the age 12 do wear a helmet in France, but the National Mountain Safety Observation System noted that this percentage decreases as people get older. The Canadian Medical Association Journal estimates that wearing a helmet reduces the risk of head injury by 35%.

Ulliel's death caused a rise in the number of ski helmet sales in France.

On 19 February 2022, Ulliel's ex-girlfriend, Gaëlle Pietri, announced that the family wanted to honor his memory by contributing to the French non-governmental organization Tara Ocean Foundation, which has the mission of raising awareness about the impact of climate change and the current ecological crisis on the oceans. Pietri said: "Gaspard was a diver, sensitive to climate issues and concerned about the protection of underwater biodiversity, he would have liked the momentum generated by his death to go to the defense of these causes that were close to his heart." A special page was opened on the foundation's website in memory of Ulliel to support this cause.

== Filmography ==
=== Film ===
Year	Title	Role	Notes	Ref.
1999	Alias	Nicolas Trajet	Short film	
2001	Brotherhood of the Wolf (Le Pacte des Loups)	Louis		
2002	Summer Things (Embrassez qui vous voudrez)	Loïc		
2003	Strayed (Les Égarés)	Yvan		
2004	The Tulse Luper Suitcases, Part 2: Vaux to the Sea	Leon		
2004	A Very Long Engagement (Un long dimanche de fiançailles)	Manech Langonnet		
2004	The Last Day (Le Dernier jour)	Simon		
2005	Nina's House (La Maison de Nina)	Izik		
2006	Paris, je t'aime	Gaspard	Segment: "Le Marais"	
2007	Jacquou le Croquant	Jacquou		
2007	Hannibal Rising	Hannibal Lecter		
2007	The Stranger (L'Inconnu)	Stranger	Short film	
2008	Souvenir (Objet Trouvé)	Party guest	Short film	
2008	The Third Part of the World (La Troisième Partie du Monde)	François		
2008	The Sea Wall (Un barrage contre le Pacifique)	Joseph		
2009	Inside Ring (aka Ultimate Heist) (Le Premier Cercle)	Anton Malakian		
2009	The Vintner's Luck	The Angel Xas		
2009	Ultimatum	Nathanaël		
2010	The Princess of Montpensier (La Princesse de Montpensier)	Henri de Guise		
2011	The Art of Love (L'art d'aimer)	William		
2012	Mes amours décomposé(s)	Corps	Short film	
2012	The American Tetralogy	French lover	Short film	
2012	A Greek Type of Problem (Tu honoreras ta mère et ta mère)	Balthazar		
2012	Rise of the Guardians	Jack Frost	Animated film; French voice	
2014	Saint Laurent	Yves Saint Laurent		
2016	It's Only the End of the World (Juste la fin du Monde)	Louis		
2016	The Dancer (La Danseuse)	Louis		
2017	Ordeal (Ordalie)	Jean	Short film	
2018	Eva	Bertrand Valade		
2018	To the Ends of the World (Les Confins du Monde)	Robert Tassen		
2018	9 Fingers (9 Doigts)	The doctor		
2018	Le Brasier Shelley	Percy Bysshe Shelley	Voice; pictureless film	
2018	One Nation, One King (Un peuple et son roi)	Basile		
2019	Sibyl	Igor		
2022	Coma	Scott	Voice; posthumous release	
2022	More Than Ever (Plus que jamais)	Matthieu	Posthumous release	

=== Television ===
Year	Title	Role	Notes	Ref.
1997	Une femme en blanc		1 episode	
1997	Mission protection rapprochée	Olivier Rousseau	1 episode	
1998	Bonnes vacances	Joël	TV film	
1999	Le Refuge	Quentin	1 episode	
1999	La Bascule	Olivier Baron	TV film	
1999	Juliette	Nicolas Dastier	TV film	
2000	Julien l'apprenti	Julien at 14	TV film	
2000	L'Oiseau rare	Gaspard	TV film	
2004	Navarro	Thierry Morlaas	1 episode	
2009	Myster Mocky présente	Various	1 episode	
2016	Vadim Mister Cool	Récitant / Narrator (voice)	TV film	
2017	Calls	Thomas	1 episode	
2019	Twice Upon a Time (Il était une seconde fois)	Vincent Dauda	Miniseries; 4 episodes	
2021	La Vengeance au Triple Galop	Danley Marchal-Widkins	TV film	
2022	Moon Knight	Anton Mogart	Miniseries; 1 episode; posthumous release	

=== Theatre ===
Year	Title	Role	Author	Director	Notes	Ref.
2012	Entertaining Mr Sloane	Mr. Sloane	Joe Orton	Michel Fau		
2015	Démons	Tomas	Lars Norén	Marcial Di Fonzo Bo		

== Awards and nominations ==
Year	Award	Category	Work	Result
2003	César Award	Most Promising Actor	Summer Things	Nominated
2003	Lumière Awards	Most Promising Actor	Summer Things	Won
2004	César Award	Most Promising Actor	Strayed	Nominated
2004	Étoiles d'Or	Best Male Newcomer	Strayed	Won
2005	César Award	Most Promising Actor	A Very Long Engagement	Won
2015	César Award	Best Actor	Saint Laurent	Nominated
2015	Globes de Cristal Award	Best Actor	Saint Laurent	Nominated
2015	Lumière Awards	Best Actor	Saint Laurent	Won
2016	International Cinephile Society Awards	Best Actor	Saint Laurent	Won
2017	César Award	Best Actor	It's Only the End of the World	Won
2017	Globes de Cristal Award	Best Actor	It's Only the End of the World	Nominated
2017	Lumière Awards	Best Actor	It's Only the End of the World	Nominated
2017	Prix Iris	Best Actor	It's Only the End of the World	Nominated
2017	Trophées Francophones du Cinéma	Best Actor	It's Only the End of the World	Nominated
2018	Apolo Awards	Best Actor	It's Only the End of the World	Nominated

=== Decorations ===
- Knight of the Order of Arts and Letters (2015)
