= Poor Souls =

Poor Souls may refer to:

- Poor Souls (band), a Scottish band
- Poor Souls (novel), a 1995 novel by Joseph Connolly
