= Children of the Century =

- Film Poster ©1999 Studio Canal
- Directed by: Diane Kurys
- Written by: Diane Kurys; Murray Head; François-Olivier Rousseau
- Produced by: Alain Sarde
- Starring: Juliette Binoche; Benoît Magimel; Stefano Dionisi
- Cinematography: Vilko Filač
- Edited by: Joële Van Effenterre
- Music by: Luis Enrique Bacalov
- Distributed by: BAC Films
- Release dates: 13 September 1999 (TIFF); 22 September 1999 (France)
- Running time: 135 minutes
- Country: France
- Language: French
- Budget: $14.5 million
- Box office: $4.1 million

Children of the Century (French: Les Enfants du siècle) is a 1999 French biographical drama film co-written and directed by Diane Kurys. It is based on the tumultuous love affair between two French literary icons of the 19th century, novelist George Sand (Juliette Binoche) and poet Alfred de Musset (Benoît Magimel).

== Plot summary ==
The story begins as George Sand leaves her marital home and arrives in Paris with her two children. Meanwhile, the young poet and dandy Alfred de Musset is busy making a name for himself both as a womaniser and a talented poet and critic. Sand and Musset first meet at a literary dinner and quickly recognise in each other a like-minded love of literature. At first their relationship remains platonic, but soon the pair embark on a tumultuous affair that will lead them to Venice and the creation of their finest works of literature.

== Cast ==
- Juliette Binoche as George Sand
- Benoît Magimel as Alfred de Musset
- Robin Renucci as François Buloz
- Stefano Dionisi as Pietro Pagello
- Karin Viard as Marie Dorval
- Denis Podalydès as Charles-Augustin Sainte-Beuve
- Isabelle Carré as Aimée d'Alton
- Patrick Chesnais as Gustave Planche
- Olivier Foubert as Paul de Musset
- Marie-France Mignal as Madame de Musset
- Ludivine Sagnier as Hermine de Musset
- Robert Plagnol as Jules Sandeau
- Michel Robin as Larive
- Mathias Mégard as Eugène Delacroix
- Arnaud Giovaninetti as Alfred Tattet
- Pascal Ternisien as Boucoiran
- Victoire Thivisol as Solange
- Julien Léal as Maurice
- Jean-Claude de Goros as Capo de Feuillide

== Background and production ==
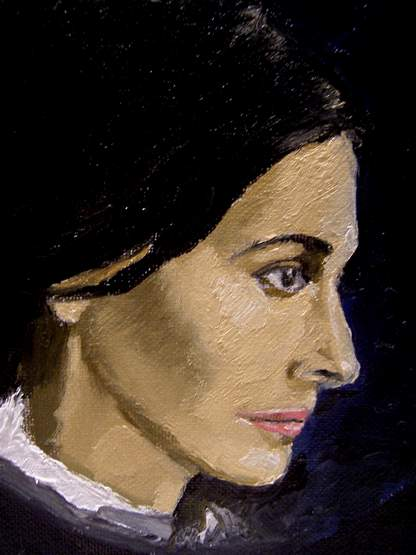
Study from life of Juliette Binoche as George Sand by Reginald Gray 1999. (collection Mrs. Fran Robinson, Yorkshire, UK.)

The film was shot on location in Paris, Nohant and Venice from August to December 1998. In an interview with The Irish Times, Kurys revealed that she was shooting in the actual rooms Sand and Musset had occupied in the Hotel Danieli, and Binoche revealed that Sand's estate had loaned the production some of her possessions including a sapphire ring and jewel-encrusted dagger. Musset's account of the affair, in his book La Confession d'un Enfant du Siècle, was Kurys' starting point for her screenplay. Binoche's attraction to the part was due to "Sand's combination of strengths and weaknesses". In 2024, Juliette Binoche revealed that a female extra was raped by an actor during the filming of an opium scene in a brothel.

=== Soundtrack ===
The soundtrack album to accompany the film was released by Decca Classics. The original music, composed by Luis Bacalov, was recorded in January 1999 by the Rome Symphony Orchestra, and featured Fábio Zanon on guitar and Leonid Kuzmin on piano. The film also features music by Ernst Eichner, Robert Schumann, and Franz Liszt, among others. The album was supervised by Murray Head.

== Release ==
=== Premiere ===
Les Enfants du Siècle made its world premiere out of competition at the 1999 Cannes Film Festival, before being released in French theatres on September 22, 1999.

The film made its North American debut at the 1999 Toronto International Film Festival.

The film made its UK debut as part of the Martell French Film Tour in September and October 2000, followed by a conventional cinematic run starting on April 6, 2001.

=== Critical reception ===
The film garnered a middling reception, with Rotten Tomatoes giving it a score of 43% based on 42 reviews and an average rating of 5.2 out of 10. The site's consensus states: "This romance is more soapy than historically compelling."

=== Versions ===
The film was released in two versions with different running times. The long version as released in France on September 22, 1999, has a running time of 135 minutes. It begins as Sand abandons her husband and arrives in revolution-torn Paris and Musset's father dies of cholera. A shorter version was released in Germany, the UK, and other territories, with a running time of 105 minutes. It begins at the literary event where Sand and Musset met and ends with their final meeting. The longer version goes on to show Sand's attempts to see the dying Musset, and ends with her reading her letters to him by his tomb.

The film was released under the English-language title Children of the Century in the US by Koch Lorber Films, but retained its French-Language title while on release in the UK, Canada, and Australia. The film was distributed in the UK by Film Four, in Canada by Alliance Atlantis, and in Australia by AE Classics.

== Books ==
Two books were published in conjunction with the film: Les Enfants du Siecle (ISBN 202037109X), a novelization of the screenplay by François-Olivier Rousseau; and Sand & Musset (ISBN 2732425575), a large format coffee-table book exploring the history of Sand and Musset and the production of the film, co-written by Jean-Pierre Guéno, Roselyne de Ayala, and Diane Kurys, with lavish illustrations by Maxime Rebiere.
