= More Than Ever (film) =

2022 European drama film

- Promotional release poster
- French: Plus que jamais
- Directed by: Emily Atef
- Written by: Emily Atef; Lars Hubrich
- Produced by: Xénia Maingot
- Starring: Vicky Krieps; Gaspard Ulliel
- Cinematography: Yves Cape
- Edited by: Sandie Bompar; Hansjörg Weißbrich
- Music by: Jon Balke
- Production companies: Niko Film; Eaux Vives Productions; Samsa Film; Mer Film; Bjoca; Jour2Fête; Ramona Productions; Bayerischer Rundfunk; Arte
- Distributed by: Jour2Fête (France); The Match Factory (Germany); Pandora Film Medien (Germany)
- Release dates: 21 May 2022 (Cannes Film Festival); 16 November 2022 (France)
- Running time: 123 minutes
- Countries: France; Germany; Luxembourg; Norway
- Languages: French; English; Norwegian
- Budget: €4.8 million
- Box office: $281,448

More Than Ever (French: Plus que jamais) is a 2022 drama film directed by Emily Atef, starring Vicky Krieps and Gaspard Ulliel in his penultimate film before his death. It is a co-production between France, Germany, Luxembourg, and Norway. The film made its world premiere at the 75th Cannes Film Festival in the Un Certain Regard section on 21 May 2022.

== Plot ==
Hélène is a 33-year-old French woman who lives in Bordeaux, France and has been in a happy marriage with Matthieu for many years. Their life turns upside down when Hélène is diagnosed with a rare lung disease. Hélène is lost on how to deal with this new situation. Looking for answers, Hélène stumbles across a Norwegian blogger by the name of Mister, who is seriously ill and documents his life with a mix of sincerity and a dry sense of humor. This and the incredible nature of Norway shown in some of his pictures attract Hélène. She contacts Mister and a genuine relationship starts between them as she seems to be able to articulate her feelings. Even if it is difficult to leave Matthieu behind, Hélène listens to her deepest instinct and travels across Europe all the way to Norway alone in order to be able to find her way. The overwhelming beauty of the vast, spectacular landscape as well as the unusual friendship with Mister do her good. When Matthieu comes to Norway to take her back to France, she realizes despite their intense love, her path is one she can only go on her own.

== Cast ==
- Vicky Krieps as Hélène
- Gaspard Ulliel as Matthieu
- Bjørn Floberg as Mister

== Production ==
=== Development and casting ===
The film is a co-production between France's Eaux Vives Productions, Bjoca, Jour2Fête, Ramona Productions and Arte with Luxembourg's Samsa Film, Norway's Mer Film, and Germany's Bayerischer Rundfunk. With a €4,8 million budget, the production is 33.07% French, 33.07% German, 23.85% Luxembourgish, and 10.01% Norwegian. The film was financially backed by Arte Grand Accord, Arte, the French National Film Board (CNC), and the French-Germany co-production treaty. Other backers include the Filmförderung Hamburg, Regional Fund Medienboard, DFFF, Pandora, Luxembourg Film Fund, Norwegian Film Fund and Zefyr Regional Fund Norway.

The film's original title was "Mister". Director Emily Atef had the idea for the film in 2010, and it took her more than ten years to get this film off the ground, find her story and convince the financiers. On 22 February 2018, Screen Daily reported that Emily Atef was preparing her first French-language production entitled Mister. Producer Xenia Maingot said Atef "wanted to aim high" for the casting of the film and that negotiations were underway with a possible high-profile French actress for the female lead. The film was scheduled to shoot in early Summer 2019.

On 21 August 2020, Screen Daily reported that the cast assembled included Luxembourgish actress Vicky Krieps, French actor Gaspard Ulliel, Danish actor Jesper Christensen, and Norwegian actress Liv Ullmann. Norwegian actor Bjørn Floberg was announced in the cast on 29 April 2021. Director Emily Atef told French newspaper Le Parisien on 20 May 2022, that it was Vicky Krieps who suggested Gaspard Ulliel for the role of Matthieu because they were friends but had never worked together. However, in an interview for France's Prèmiere magazine a few days later, Atef said that Krieps suggested Ulliel for the film after meeting him during a casting. Atef said that three years before the film was made, Ulliel went to see her with notes such as the first name of his character and that he offered her many things regarding the film. Atef also said that Ulliel remained faithful to the project despite its many delays and money problems.

=== Filming ===
Filming started in France on 14 April 2021. Filming took place in Bordeaux, France, between 14 and 23 April, before moving to a Luxembourg studio in late April. In the meantime, Gaspard Ulliel was also filming La Vengeance au Triple Galop between April and May 2021. Production then moved to Norway on 11 May 2021, followed by a compulsory period of quarantine (due to the COVID-19 pandemic), where it wrapped filming on 4 June 2021.

Gaspard Ulliel died on 19 January 2022 following a skiing accident in France. More Than Ever was the penultimate film that Ulliel shot before his death, although it is often cited and promoted as his last film. After finishing More Than Ever on 4 June 2021, he filmed the miniseries Moon Knight, and in December 2021 he completed Bertrand Bonello's 2022 film Coma, but Ulliel's role in Coma was kept a secret until the film was selected for the Berlin Film Festival in February 2022, making it the first film released after his death despite being the last one he filmed.

Ulliel had been scheduled to do post-synchronization for More Than Ever three weeks after the skiing accident that caused his death.

== Release ==
The film made its world premiere at the 75th Cannes Film Festival in the Un Certain Regard section on 21 May 2022. It will be released in France by Jour2Fête on 16 November 2022.

== Reception ==
Review aggregator Rotten Tomatoes reports that 93% of 30 reviews are positive, with an average rating of 7.1/10.

== Accolades ==
Award	Date of ceremony	Category	Recipient(s)	Result	Ref(s)
Cannes Film Festival	27 May 2022	Un Certain Regard	Emily Atef	Nominated	
