= Twice Upon a Time (miniseries) =

2019 French miniseries

- Promotional poster
- French: Il était une seconde fois
- Genre: Drama; Sci-Fi; Thriller; Romance
- Created by: Guillaume Nicloux
- Written by: Guillaume Nicloux; Nathalie Leuthreau
- Directed by: Guillaume Nicloux
- Starring: Gaspard Ulliel; Freya Mavor; Patrick d'Assumçao; Richard Dillane; Claire Sermonne; Eva Ionesco; Alaa Safi; Steve Tran; Julianne Binard; Émile Berling; Sylvain Creuzevault; Juliette Anquetil
- Composer: Julia Kent
- Country of origin: France
- Original languages: French; English
- No. of seasons: 1
- No. of episodes: 4

Production
- Producers: Bruno Nahon; Caroline Nataf
- Cinematography: Yves Cape
- Running time: 52 minutes
- Production companies: Unité de Production; Arte France

Original release
- Network: Arte
- Release: 29 August 2019

Twice Upon A Time (French: Il était une seconde fois) is a four-part French sci-fi drama miniseries first broadcast in 2019, directed by Guillaume Nicloux, starring Gaspard Ulliel and Freya Mavor. The miniseries was broadcast in France via the network Arte on 29 August 2019. It was released in the United States on Netflix on 19 December 2019. Twice Upon A Time was the second collaboration between director Guillaume Nicloux and actor Gaspard Ulliel, the first was the 2018 war film To the Ends of the World.

== Plot ==
Vincent Dauda, in his thirties, dreams of winning back his ex, Louise. He's grief-stricken and driven to despair, kisses the break-up goodbye with nocturnal parties, ephemeral affairs... until the day when a delivery man gives him a parcel he never ordered. A strange box, without any bottom, through which he can time travel, which takes him back to Louise's side, before they split up.

== Cast ==
- Gaspard Ulliel as Vincent Dauda
- Freya Mavor as Louise Arron
- Patrick d'Assumçao as André
- Jonathan Manzambi as Livreur
- Steve Tran as Than
- Claire Sermonne as Nadège
- Richard Dillane as David Arron
- Jonathan Couzinié as Romain
- Sacha Canuyt as Stanley
- Yves Cape as François
- Steve Whiteley as James
- Marie Gaillet as Chloé
- Yvan Delatour as Jordan
- Esteban Carvajal Alegria as Thibault
- Sylvain Creuzevault as Alexis
- Eva Ionesco as Annie Arron
- Alaa Safi as Nordine
- Paul Bandey as the English doctor
- Lukas Ionesco as Clément
- Émile Berling as Raphaël
- Julianne Binard as Sophie
- Éric Viellard as Franck Rivière
- Aurélia Thierrée as Madam Reverty
- Anthony Paliotti a Stéphane
- Magali Heu as Claire
- Thomas Rodriguez as Jordan
- Juliette Joy Anquetil as Gwen

== Production ==
=== Casting ===
Gaspard Ulliel was announced as the male lead on 18 September 2017. Stacy Martin was announced as the female lead on 26 December 2017. Martin's name was still listed in casting calls until 5 January 2018. Freya Mavor replaced Martin on 18 January 2018, a week before filming started.

=== Filming ===
Filming started on 29 January 2018 and ended on 6 April 2018. Shooting took place in Paris, London, Bordeaux, and Iceland.

== Release ==
On February 11, 2019, it was announced that Federation Entertainment had acquired worldwide rights to the series. Federation holds worldwide rights to the series outside Germany and German-speaking territories.

All of the four episodes of the miniseries were screened at the Berlin International Film Festival on 12 February 2019.

The miniseries aired on the French TV channel Arte on 29 August 2019, and was made available for streaming in full on arte.tv from August 22 to 26 October 2019. It was released in the United States through Netflix on 19 December 2019.
