= 3 Days in Quiberon =

2018 film by Emily Atef

- Film poster
- Directed by: Emily Atef
- Written by: Emily Atef
- Produced by: Karsten Stöter
- Starring: Marie Bäumer; Birgit Minichmayr; Charly Hübner; Robert Gwisdek; Denis Lavant
- Cinematography: Thomas W. Kiennast
- Edited by: Hansjörg Weißbrich
- Music by: Christoph M. Kaiser; Julian Maas
- Production companies: Rohfilm Factory; Dor Film; Sophie Dulac Productions; Tita B Productions; Departures Film
- Distributed by: Prokino Filmverleih 20th Century Fox (Germany); Filmladen Filmverleih (Austria); Sophie Dulac Distribution (France)
- Release dates: 19 February 2018 (Berlinale); 12 April 2018 (Germany)
- Running time: 115 minutes
- Countries: Germany; Austria; France
- Languages: German; French; English

3 Days in Quiberon (German: 3 Tage in Quiberon) is a 2018 drama film written and directed by Emily Atef, based on an idea by Denis Poncet. It is an international co-production between Germany, Austria, and France. It stars Marie Bäumer as famous actress Romy Schneider, with Birgit Minichmayr, Charly Hübner, Robert Gwisdek, and Denis Lavant in supporting roles. It focuses on three days during the last year of Schneider's life.

The film had its world premiere at the 68th Berlin International Film Festival on 19 February 2018, and was released in Germany on 12 April 2018, by Prokino Filmverleih. It received positive reviews from critics, who mostly praised Atef's direction and the performances of the cast. It earned ten nominations at the 68th German Film Awards, winning in seven categories: Best Film, Best Director, Best Actress (for Bäumer), Best Supporting Actress (for Minichmayr), Best Supporting Actor (for Gwisdek), Best Cinematography, and Best Score. At the 31st European Film Awards, Bäumer was nominated for Best Actress, while Christoph M. Kaiser and Julian Maas won Best Composer.

== Plot ==
In 1981 at a spa in Quiberon, the celebrated actress Romy Schneider is undergoing a cure. Ignoring the strict regime, she largely exists on tobacco, alcohol, and tranquillisers. Hilde, an old friend from Vienna, comes to spend a couple of days with her and she is also visited by another old friend, the photographer Robert Lebeck. He brings a journalist, Michael Jürgs, to whom Romy has agreed to give an in-depth interview for the German magazine Stern.

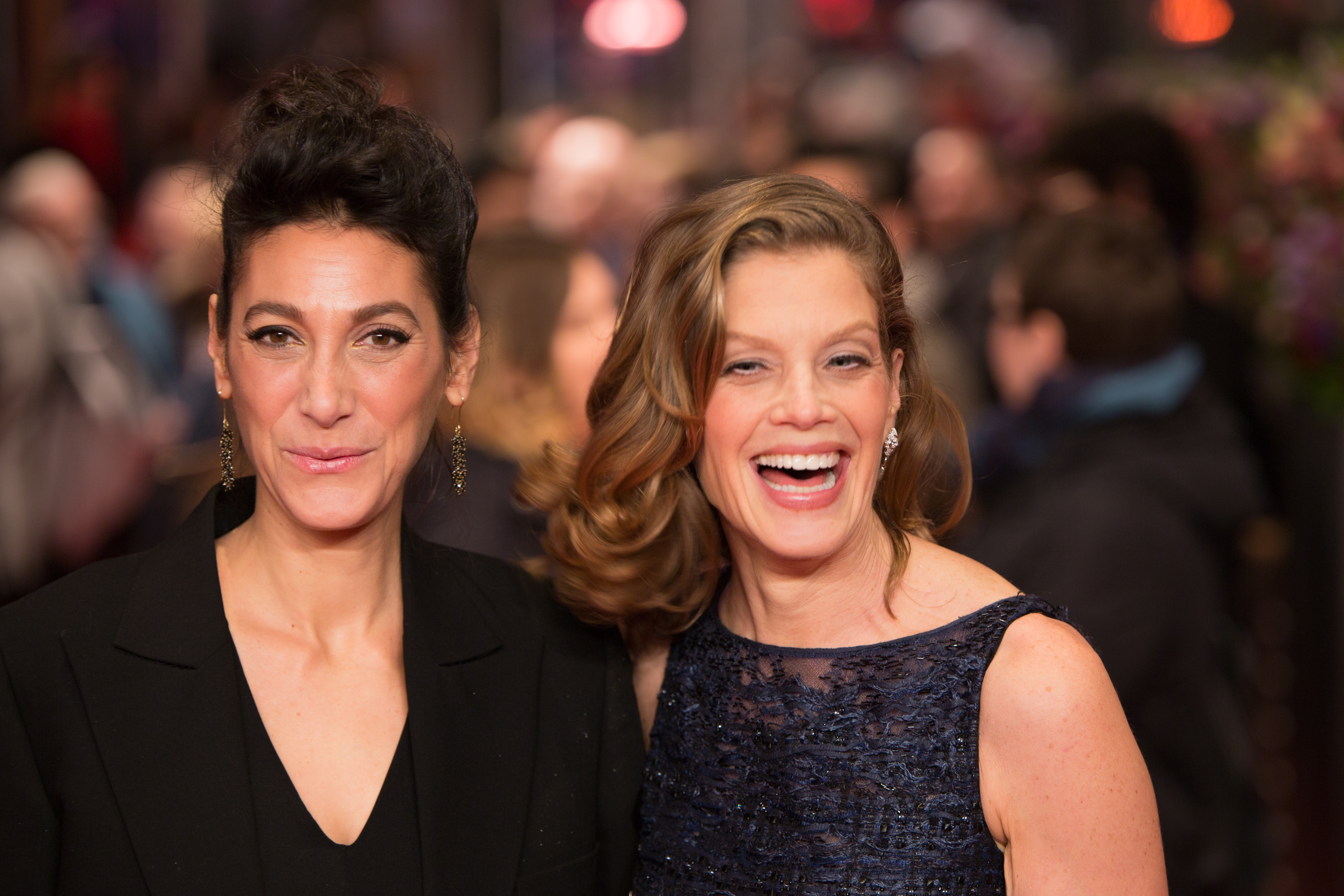
Emily Atef and Marie Bäumer at the Berlinale 2018

Michael does not attempt to ingratiate himself or first win her confidence but in a clinical way probes with continually penetrating questions. Their sessions take on the air of a Catholic confessional or a psychiatrist's consulting room, for Romy seems ready to be open and to put on record much about her life. Indeed, both Hilde and Robert at different times try to protect her from going too far.

Romy says her main worry is the constant pressure of film work and her resulting absence from the lives of her children. After the interviews are over, she dances for joy on the rocks and breaks her ankle. Unable to work, she is confined to her Paris flat with her little daughter when Robert brings the proofs of the interview for her to approve. She makes virtually no changes, accepting that Michael had captured a true picture of her.

== Cast ==
- Marie Bäumer as Romy Schneider
- Birgit Minichmayr as Hilde Fritsch
- Charly Hübner as Robert Lebeck
- Robert Gwisdek as Michael Jürgs
- Denis Lavant as Fischer Poet
- Christopher Buchholz as Dr. Frelin
- Vicky Krieps as Hotel maid
- Yann Grouhel as Receptionist
- Vincent Furic as Dr. Moriette
- Loïc Baylacq as Innkeeper

== Production ==
3 Days in Quiberon was initially developed by French producer Denis Poncet, who died while production was underway. He chose Marie Bäumer for the role of Schneider. Poncet and Bäumer then approached Emily Atef with the project. Atef said about her narrative concept: "It was a conscious decision not to do a biopic. I didn't want to tell the story of her life, but rather concentrate on three day in Romy's life." She did not see the film as an homage to Schneider either, but rather as a "snapshot of a period in her life, in which she manages for a moment to free herself from a massive crisis".

The film was produced by Karsten Stöter's Leipzig-based Rohfilm Factory in co-production with Austria's Dor Film, France's Sophie Dulac Productions and Tita B Productions, and Germany's Departures Film. Principal photography took place in France and Germany. It was shot in black-and-white in 32 days, from November 2016 to January 2017.

== Release ==
In February 2018, Beta Cinema acquired international distribution rights to 3 Days in Quiberon. The film premiered in the main competition section of the 68th Berlin International Film Festival on 19 February 2018. It was theatrically released in Germany on 12 April 2018, by Prokino Filmverleih through 20th Century Fox, and in Austria and France the following day, by Filmladen Filmverleih and Sophie Dulac Distribution, respectively. Afterwards, it was released on Blu-ray in Germany by Euro Video and Prokino on 20 September 2018, and in select cinemas in the United Kingdom by Modern Films on 16 November 2018.

== Reception ==
=== Box office ===
3 Days in Quiberon grossed over $1.8 million worldwide.

=== Critical response ===
On the review aggregator website Rotten Tomatoes, 83% of 12 critics' reviews are positive, with an average rating of 7.3/10.

Stephen Dalton of The Hollywood Reporter stated, "3 Days in Quiberon gives Bäumer ample room to play flighty, brittle, defiant, needy, haughty, seductive and fifty shades of vulnerable. While technically a four-hander, this is really a one-woman show. But a single knockout performance does not make a compelling film, and Atef's intimate psychodrama ultimately lacks the imaginative verve and narrative meat to fill its overlong running time." Jay Weissberg of Variety opined, "Bäumer's uncanny resemblance and fine central performance anchor what is ultimately a predictable treatment of a tortured actress, nicely lensed in black and white, that will find resonance in countries where Schneider remains a much-beloved star." However, Vladan Petković of Cineuropa commented, "3 Days in Quiberon is not a biopic in the literal sense, but it certainly feels like one. The way Romy is portrayed fits all of the prejudices and ideas that the audience might have about her. [...] The only thing that really separates the film from standard Hallmark Channel-style biographies is Thomas Kiennast's elegant black-and-white cinematography and meticulous framing."

Peter Bradshaw of The Guardian gave the film 3 out of 5 stars, describing it as "a curious movie: ruminative, lugubrious and theatrical – intense at some moments; at others low-key and almost inconsequential." Wendy Ide of The Observer gave the film 4 out of 5 stars, calling it "handsome, scrupulously well-crafted" and writing that "the camera brilliantly mirrors Schneider's mercurial moods."

=== Accolades ===
At the 68th German Film Awards, 3 Days in Quiberon received a leading ten nominations and won seven awards: Golden Lola for Best Film, Best Director (for Atef), Best Actress (for Bäumer), Best Supporting Actress (for Minichmayr), Best Supporting Actor (for Gwisdek), Best Cinematography (for Kiennast), and Best Score (for Kaiser and Maas). For their performances, Bäumer was given a Bavarian Film Award and Minichmayr earned an Austrian Film Award nomination. The film was also nominated for Best Actress (for Bäumer) and Best Composer (for Kaiser and Maas) at the 31st European Film Awards, winning the latter.
