= Summer Things =

2002 French-British-Italian romantic comedy-drama film

- French theatrical release poster
- French: Embrassez qui vous voudrez
- Directed by: Michel Blanc
- Written by: Michel Blanc
- Based on: Summer Things by Joseph Connolly
- Produced by: Yves Marmion
- Starring: Charlotte Rampling; Jacques Dutronc; Carole Bouquet; Michel Blanc; Karin Viard; Gaspard Ulliel
- Cinematography: Sean Bobbitt
- Edited by: Maryline Monthieux
- Music by: Mark Russell
- Production companies: Mercury Film Productions; Dan Films; Alia Film; France 2 Cinéma
- Distributed by: UGC Fox Distribution (France); UGC Films (United Kingdom)
- Release dates: 9 October 2002 (France); 31 October 2002 (Italy); 4 March 2003 (United Kingdom)
- Running time: 103 minutes
- Countries: France; United Kingdom; Italy
- Languages: French; English
- Budget: €11.4 million
- Box office: US$8,7 million

Summer Things (French: Embrassez qui vous voudrez; Italian: Baciate chi vi pare, also known as See How They Run) is a 2002 romantic comedy-drama film written and directed by Michel Blanc, based on the 1998 novel of the same name by Joseph Connolly. The ensemble cast includes Charlotte Rampling, Jacques Dutronc, Carole Bouquet, Michel Blanc, Karin Viard, Gaspard Ulliel and Mélanie Laurent. The film is a co-production between France, the United Kingdom and Italy.

The film was released to critical acclaim and was a box-office hit in France, with over 1 million tickets sold. Karin Viard won the César Award for Best Supporting Actress for her performance as Véronique. Gaspard Ulliel won the Lumière Award for Most Promising Actor for his performance as Loïc.

== Plot ==
Elizabeth and Bertrand are typical representatives of Parisian society. Behind the facade of a perfect marriage is dissatisfaction and boredom. He is a successful real estate agent having fun with much younger women or men behind the back of his wife. She suffers under the crushing uneventful life of a housewife and looks forward to a family holiday with daughter Emily. Bertrand backs out at the last minute and sends in his place Julie, Elizabeth's best friend and his former lover. He is free for a new love affair in Paris. The neighbors, Véro and Jérôme have very different problems. Jérôme is unemployed and collects gas meters. He hides his feelings of failure from Véro and son Loic. Since Véro wants to keep up with the neighbors, both families end up in the same resort. Numerous mistakes, misunderstandings and surprises are inevitable.

== Cast ==
- Charlotte Rampling as Elizabeth Lannier
- Jacques Dutronc as Bertrand Lannier
- Carole Bouquet as Lulu
- Michel Blanc as Jean-Pierre
- Karin Viard as Véronique
- Denis Podalydès as Jérôme
- Clotilde Courau as Julie
- Vincent Elbaz as Maxime
- Lou Doillon as Emilie
- Sami Bouajila as Kévin
- Gaspard Ulliel as Loïc
- Mélanie Laurent as Carole

== Reception ==
=== Critical response ===
On Rotten Tomatoes, the film holds an approval rating of 100%, based on 6 reviews, with an average rating of 7.4/10.

AlloCiné, a French cinema website, gave the film an average rating of 4.0/5, based on a survey of 23 French reviews.

=== Box office ===
In France, Summer Things was released to 408 screens, where it debuted at number three at the box office, selling 480,951 tickets. It sold a total of 1,336,579 tickets after 6 weeks in cinemas, ranking at number 24 of the highest-grossing films in France in 2002. The film grossed a total of $8,738,101 worldwide.

== Accolades ==
Year	Award / Film Festival	Category	Recipient(s)	Result	Ref.
2003	César Awards	Best Supporting Actor	Denis Podalydès	Nominated	
2003	César Awards	Best Supporting Actress	Karin Viard	Won	
2003	César Awards	Best Original Screenplay or Adaptation	Michel Blanc	Nominated	
2003	César Awards	Most Promising Actor	Gaspard Ulliel	Nominated	
2003	Lumière Awards	Most Promising Actor	Gaspard Ulliel	Won	
