= The Princess of Montpensier =

2010 French film by Bertrand Tavernier

- Theatrical release poster
- French: La Princesse de Montpensier
- Directed by: Bertrand Tavernier
- Screenplay by: Jean Cosmos; François-Olivier Rousseau; Bertrand Tavernier
- Story by: Madame de La Fayette
- Produced by: Marc Silam; Eric Heuman
- Starring: Mélanie Thierry; Gaspard Ulliel; Grégoire Leprince-Ringuet; Lambert Wilson; Raphaël Personnaz
- Cinematography: Bruno de Keyzer
- Edited by: Sophie Brunet
- Music by: Philippe Sarde
- Production companies: Paradis Films; StudioCanal
- Distributed by: StudioCanal
- Release dates: 16 May 2010 (Cannes); 3 November 2010 (France)
- Running time: 139 minutes
- Country: France
- Language: French
- Budget: $14.5 million
- Box office: $7 million

The Princess of Montpensier (French: La Princesse de Montpensier) is a 2010 French period romance film directed by Bertrand Tavernier, inspired by a short story of the same name published anonymously by Madame de La Fayette in 1662. It stars Mélanie Thierry in the title role, alongside Gaspard Ulliel, Grégoire Leprince-Ringuet, Lambert Wilson and Raphaël Personnaz.

The film mixes fiction and history in the years of bloody conflict known as the Wars of Religion, which not only opposed Catholics with Protestants but also involved bitter power struggles between factions of the nobility and the royal family. The culminating event is the St Bartholomew's Day massacre in 1572, during which mobs of armed Catholics hunted down and slaughtered thousands of their Protestant neighbours. Amid these dramatic events, the central story is that of the Princess, who loves a childhood friend but is forced into marriage with another man and is in turn loved by her older tutor. The film competed at the 63rd Cannes Film Festival and was released in French cinemas on 3 November 2010.

== Plot ==
Sickened at the meaningless bloodshed between Catholics and Protestants in the French Wars of Religion (1562-1598), the Count of Chabannes, a Huguenot Protestant, of middle age, decides to desert from the Prince of Condé's army. Captured by bandits who are about to hang him, he is rescued by a former pupil, the young Prince of Montpensier, who has been fighting for the Catholic side, but who bears a high regard for his former tutor. The two ride together to the castle of the Mézières family, whom the prince's father has been visiting to negotiate a marriage between his son and their daughter. This is Marie Mézières age 17. She has never met her intended husband, but has been on intimate terms with her childhood friend, the hot-headed young Henri Duke of Guise of the powerful and ambitious Guise family. Guise is outraged to hear that Marie is to be given to another. He and Montpensier draw swords, but Chabannes stops the fight and tries to reconcile them. The grateful Montpensier takes Chabannes, whose life is in danger since he is now considered an enemy by the Catholics and a deserter by the Huguenots, into his protection.

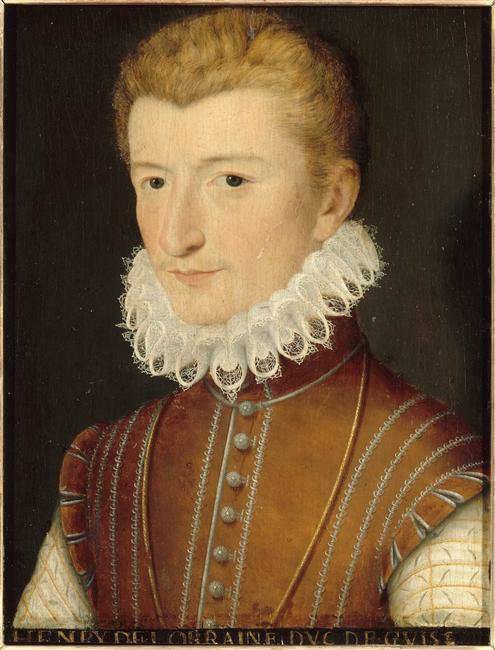
Henri, duc de Guise

After their marriage the newly-weds, accompanied by Chabannes, travel to Montpensier's castle. On the way Chabannes confesses to Marie his revulsion at the brutality of the religious wars and his remorse over his former part in them, for in the heat of battle, he had killed a pregnant woman.

Not long after their arrival a summons from the royal court in Paris abruptly separates the young couple, who are still barely acquainted. The prince leaves Marie to the care of Chabannes as her tutor, directing him to polish up her humanistic education so that she can be presented at court. In the course of their studies the lonely bride and the disillusioned count become close, so much so that the older man, struck by Marie's quickness of mind as well as her beauty, imprudently confesses his hopeless love. She answers that she will forget his words, for she values his friendship.

Montpensier returns home for a while but soon receives a letter summoning him again to Paris. When Chabannes takes the letter to the bedroom, he finds couple asleep naked, and Marie does not attempt to cover herself. Before Montpensier can take his departure, however, Guise appears on their estate with his cousin, the elegant and polished Duke of Anjou, brother of the childless and ailing King Charles IX, and next in line to the throne. By chance, the visiting noblemen see Marie standing in a boat on the river, accompanied by her women. Anjou, too, is struck by Marie's beauty. Reluctantly, Montpensier, who is now prey to the most intense jealousy, invites them into the castle for dinner, where Anjou, Guise, Montpensier, and Chabannes, all now in love with Marie, engage in tense conversation.

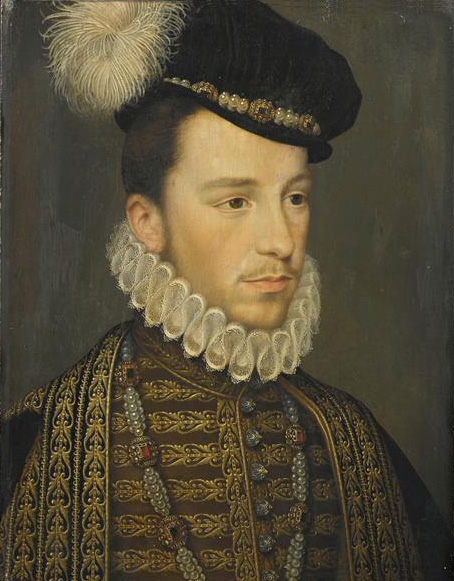
Henri, duc d'Anjou

The party then travels to Paris, where Montpensier surprises Guise and Marie talking intimately together. Swords are again drawn. This time it is Anjou who breaks up the fight. Guise then catches Marie on a staircase and starts kissing her, but she breaks away. She confides in Chabannes, who advises her to keep well clear of Guise. Guise, he warns her, is simultaneously courting another woman, the royal princess Marguerite of Valois, sister of Anjou.

But Marie, driven by passion, still desires a meeting with Guise. At a masked ball she asks Guise to meet her on the same staircase as before. However, the man behind the mask is not Guise but Anjou. Anjou immediately finds Guise and tells him to stay away from Marie. He then goes to Marie and also warns her that Guise is an unscrupulous character who is presently courting his sister, Princess Marguerite.

Montpensier, maddened with helpless jealousy and humiliation, orders Chabannes to escort Marie back to the country in the morning. That night, however, Guise, shows up, puts a dagger to Chabannes' throat, and demands to be taken to Marie's bedroom. Once admitted, Guise declares his love, but hearing blows on the locked door, he escapes. Montpensier breaks in and, furious to find Chabannes in his wife's bedroom, dismisses him from his service and departs. Guise then slips back in and has a night of love with Marie.

Marie rides home alone, while the now penniless Chabannes takes a room in a modest inn in exchange for working in the stables. Marie and her husband decide to separate, though the prince still hopes for a reconciliation. On the evening of 24 August 1572 the dread Massacre of Saint Bartholomew begins: Catholic mobs led by Guise start massacring all the Protestants they can find. While protecting a pregnant woman, Chabannes is killed.

Montpensier rides to see Marie to give her the news that Chabannes is dead, that Anjou is going away to be king of Poland, and that Guise is marrying a wealthy heiress at Blois the next day. Marie rides immediately to Blois and tells Guise she is ready to leave Montpensier for him, but he answers that he no longer loves her and must keep his engagement. Marie remembers the last words to her of Chabannes: "As you have lost the trust of your husband and the heart of your lover, at least you have my true friendship." Dressed in black, through a snow-covered landscape, she rides to his tomb.

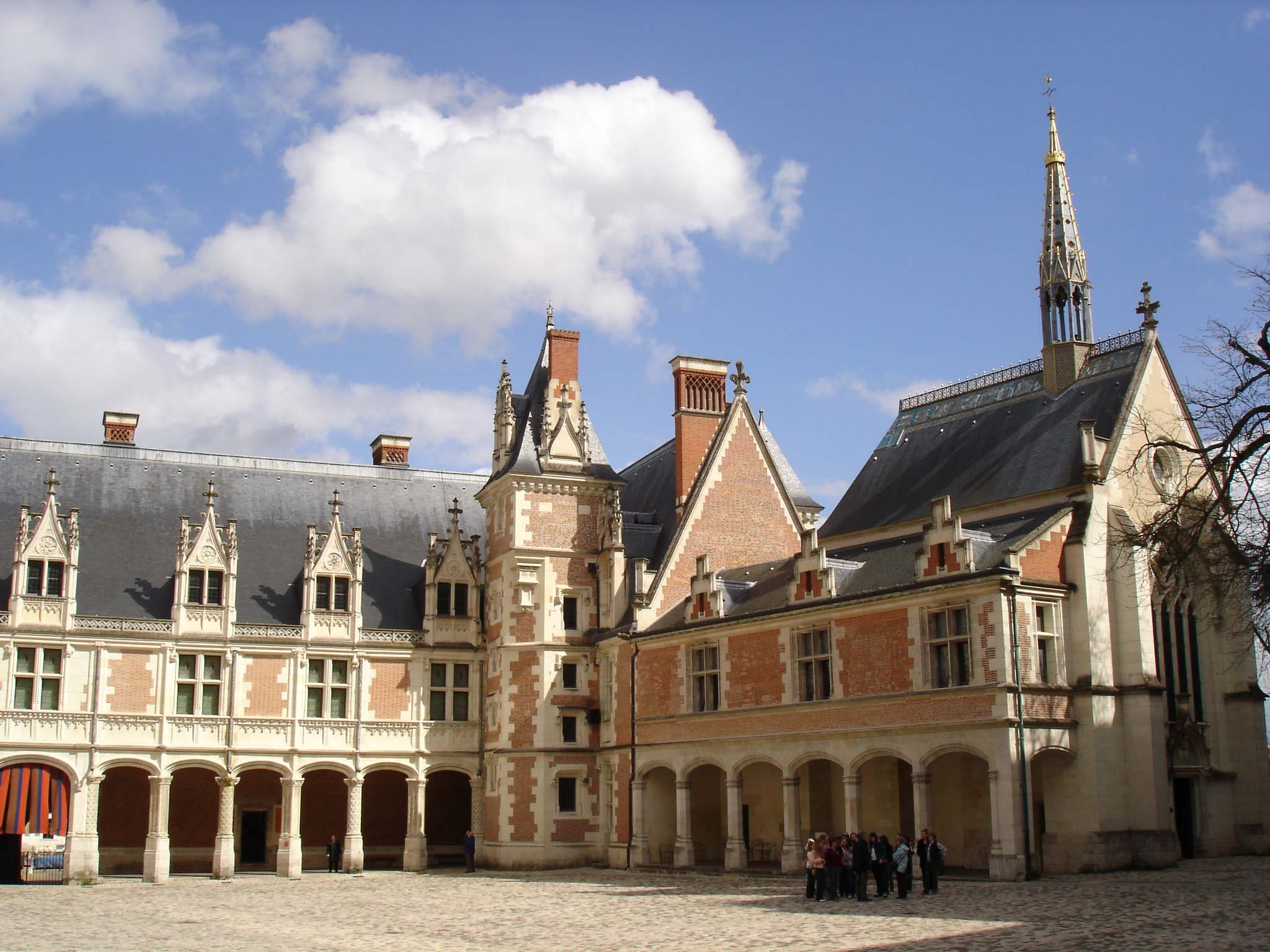
Château de Blois

== Cast ==
- Mélanie Thierry as Marie, Marquise of Mézières
- Gaspard Ulliel as Henri, Duke of Guise
- Grégoire Leprince-Ringuet as Philippe, Prince of Montpensier
- Raphaël Personnaz as Henry, Duke of Anjou
- Lambert Wilson as François, Count of Chabannes
- Michel Vuillermoz as the Duke of Montpensier, Philippe's father
- Judith Chemla as Catherine of Guise, sister of Henri, Duke of Guise
- Philippe Magnan as the Marquis of Mézières, Marie's father
- Jean-Pol Dubois as Charles, Cardinal of Lorraine
- César Domboy as Charles, Duke of Mayenne, brother of Henri, Duke of Guise
- Anatole de Bodinat as the Duke of Joyeuse
- Éric Rulliat as the Count of Quélus
- Samuel Theis as La Valette
- Florence Thomassin as the Marquise of Mézières, Marie's mother

== Production ==
Unusual for a Bertrand Tavernier project, the director was not attached from the very start. When he became involved, there was already a first version of a screenplay written by François-Olivier Rousseau. With his usual co-writer Jean Cosmos, Tavernier went back to the original source in order to adapt the script to his own vision. The screenplay was not an entirely faithful adaptation of the original short story, published anonymously in 1662. "Mme de La Fayette, who was from the 17th century, wrote about the 16th. Knowing that the 17th century had become very puritanical, while the 16th was not, we removed some filters, but never bent the feelings portrayed", Tavernier explained in Le Figaro.

The film was produced by Paradis Films. It received co-production support from StudioCanal, the television channels France 2 and France 3 and the German company Pandora. Additional funding was provided by the National Center of Cinematography and the Deutsch-Französische Förderkommission. The budget was 13.35 million euro.

Costumes were made in Italy and England. An inspiration for the costume design was the 1994 film La Reine Margot, which is set during the same period. What Tavernier liked about the film was how casual the costumes were, and not at all based on the ceremonial clothing seen in paintings from 16th century. Horses were brought to the set from Paris. Lambert Wilson and Raphaël Personnaz were the only actors with previous riding experience, and all main actors prepared for their roles by taking riding lessons.

Filming started 28 September 2009 and lasted nine weeks, in the city Angers and the regions Centre and Cantal. Filming locations included the Château de Blois and the Château de Messilhac, with more than 100 people working permanently on the sets. Scenes were also shot at the Palais Jacques Cœur in Bourges, the Château de Meillant in Meillant, on the streets of Chinon and in the village of Lacalm. For the riding scenes, a steadicam was placed on a motorcycle or a small car in order to provide freedom of movement for the riders. Tavernier drew inspiration from old Western films, where important conversations often take place on horseback. The lighting was inspired by film noir, as the director primarily aimed to create an atmosphere of emotional tension, "not imitate paintings or pictorial reconstruction". The film was shot in Panavision and contains no artificial special effects or computer-generated imagery.

== Release ==
The film premiered on 16 May as part of the main competition of the 2010 Cannes Film Festival. StudioCanal released it in 384 French cinemas on 3 November the same year. Distribution rights for the United States were bought in Cannes by IFC Films, which releases it on 1 April 2011.

== Reception ==
As of June 2020, the film holds an 85% approval rating on Rotten Tomatoes, based on 66 reviews with an average rating of 7.01 out of 10. At Metacritic, the film has a score of 78 out of 100 based on 20 reviews, indicating "generally favorable reviews".

François-Guillaume Lorrain reviewed the film for Le Point and was impressed by the adaptation: "Tavernier knows how to give breath, get rid of dust, be modern, without ever sullying the original". Lorrain complimented the performances of Wilson, Vuillermoz, Personnaz and Leprince-Ringuet, and wrote that the film "reconciles the taste of unbound feelings and sharp blades". Léo Soesanto of Les Inrockuptibles was less enthusiastic and described the film as "the wars of religion in a teen movie". He did think it had a certain sense of fresh air and lucidity, but that "the flamboyant feelings and the battles are freeze-dried", which only left an impression of emptiness. It received the top rating of three stars in Le Parisien, where Marie Sauvion wrote: "The beauty of the images, of the costumes, the delight of a dusted off romance, of an inspiring troupe of actors, of amazing supporting roles ... , all of this contributes to make The Princess of Montpensier an ambitious and poignant film."

In the U.S., the film has received largely favorable reviews, including one from Roger Ebert. Stanley Kauffmann of The New Republic wrote: "The Princess of Montpensier proves again that Tavernier is a master, partly because his mastery extends to sustaining his work without quite the people he needs".

== Accolades ==
Award / Film Festival	Category	Recipients and nominees	Result
Cannes Film Festival	Palme d'Or		Nominated
Cabourg Film Festival	Male Revelation	Raphaël Personnaz	Won
César Awards	Most Promising Actor	Grégoire Leprince-Ringuet	Nominated
César Awards	Most Promising Actor	Raphaël Personnaz	Nominated
César Awards	Best Adaptation	Jean Cosmos, Francois-Olivier Rousseau and Bertrand Tavernier	Nominated
César Awards	Best Cinematography	Bruno de Keyzer	Nominated
César Awards	Best Original Music	Philippe Sarde	Nominated
César Awards	Best Costume Design	Caroline de Vivaise	Won
César Awards	Best Production Design	Guy-Claude Francois	Nominated
Lumière Awards	Best Actor	Lambert Wilson	Nominated

== See also ==
- 17th-century French literature
- Duchy of Montpensier
- Counts and Dukes of Guise
- House of Valois
