= Angst (2003 film) =

2003 film

- Theatrical release poster
- Directed by: Oskar Roehler
- Written by: Oskar Roehler
- Produced by: Eberhard Junkersdorf; Dietmar Güntsche; Bernd Burgemeister
- Cinematography: Hagen Bogdanski
- Edited by: Uli Schön
- Music by: Martin Todsharow
- Distributed by: X Verleih AG (through Warner Bros.)
- Release dates: 14 February 2003 (Berlinale); 24 April 2003
- Running time: 92 minutes
- Country: Germany
- Language: German

Angst (in English: fear) (German: Der alte Affe Angst) is a 2003 German drama film directed by Oskar Roehler, starring André Hennicke, Marie Bäumer and Vadim Glowna. It follows a stage director who goes through a personal crisis.

== Cast ==
- André Hennicke as Robert
- Marie Bäumer as Marie
- Vadim Glowna as Klaus
- Hilde von Mieghem as Brigitte
- Hermann Beyer as Marie's father
- Jutta Hoffmann as Marie's mother
- Christoph Waltz as psychoanalyst
- Herbert Knaup as Wolfgang
- Ralf Bauer as Markus
- Michaela Hinnenthal as Gregor's mother
- Peter Benedict as dramaturge
- Nina Petri as psychiatrist
- Catherine Flemming as mother
- Eva Habermann as Laura
- Ingrid van Bergen as Hannelore K.

== Production ==
The film was produced through Neue Bioskop Film Produktions & Vertrieb, TV 60 Filmproduktion and Bayerischer Rundfunk. Filming took place in Berlin and Wolfen from 9 April to 5 June 2002.

== Release ==
The film premiered on 14 February 2003 in competition at the 53rd Berlin International Film Festival. It was released in German cinemas by X Verleih on 24 April 2003.
