= The Last Day (2004 film) =

2004 film by Rodolphe Marconi

- Theatrical release poster
- French: Le Dernier Jour
- Directed by: Rodolphe Marconi
- Written by: Rodolphe Marconi
- Produced by: Paulo Branco
- Starring: Nicole Garcia; Gaspard Ulliel; Mélanie Laurent; Bruno Todeschini; Alysson Paradis; Thibault Vinçon; Christophe Malavoy
- Cinematography: Hélène Louvart
- Edited by: Isabelle Devinck
- Production company: Gémini Films
- Distributed by: Gémini Films
- Release date: 3 November 2004 (France)
- Running time: 104 minutes
- Country: France
- Language: French

The Last Day (French: Le Dernier Jour) is a 2004 French romantic drama film written and directed by Rodolphe Marconi, starring Nicole Garcia and Gaspard Ulliel.

== Plot ==
At Christmas, 18-year-old Simon arrives at his parents' home with a young woman he has just met on the night train. During the stay, a phone call comes to stir this family that has been keeping a secret for twenty years. At the same time, Simon is dealing with his unrequited love for another man.

== Cast ==
- Gaspard Ulliel as Simon
- Nicole Garcia as Marie
- Mélanie Laurent as Louise
- Bruno Todeschini as Marc
- Alysson Paradis as Alice
- Christophe Malavoy as Jean-Louis
- Thibault Vinçon as Mathieu

== Release ==
The film was released in France by Gémini Films on 3 November 2004. Strand Releasing acquired the U.S. rights to the film and released it on DVD on 13 December 2005.

== Reception ==
French cinema website AlloCiné gave the film an average rating of 3.3/5, based on a survey of 15 French reviews.
