= François Florent =

French actor (1937–2021)

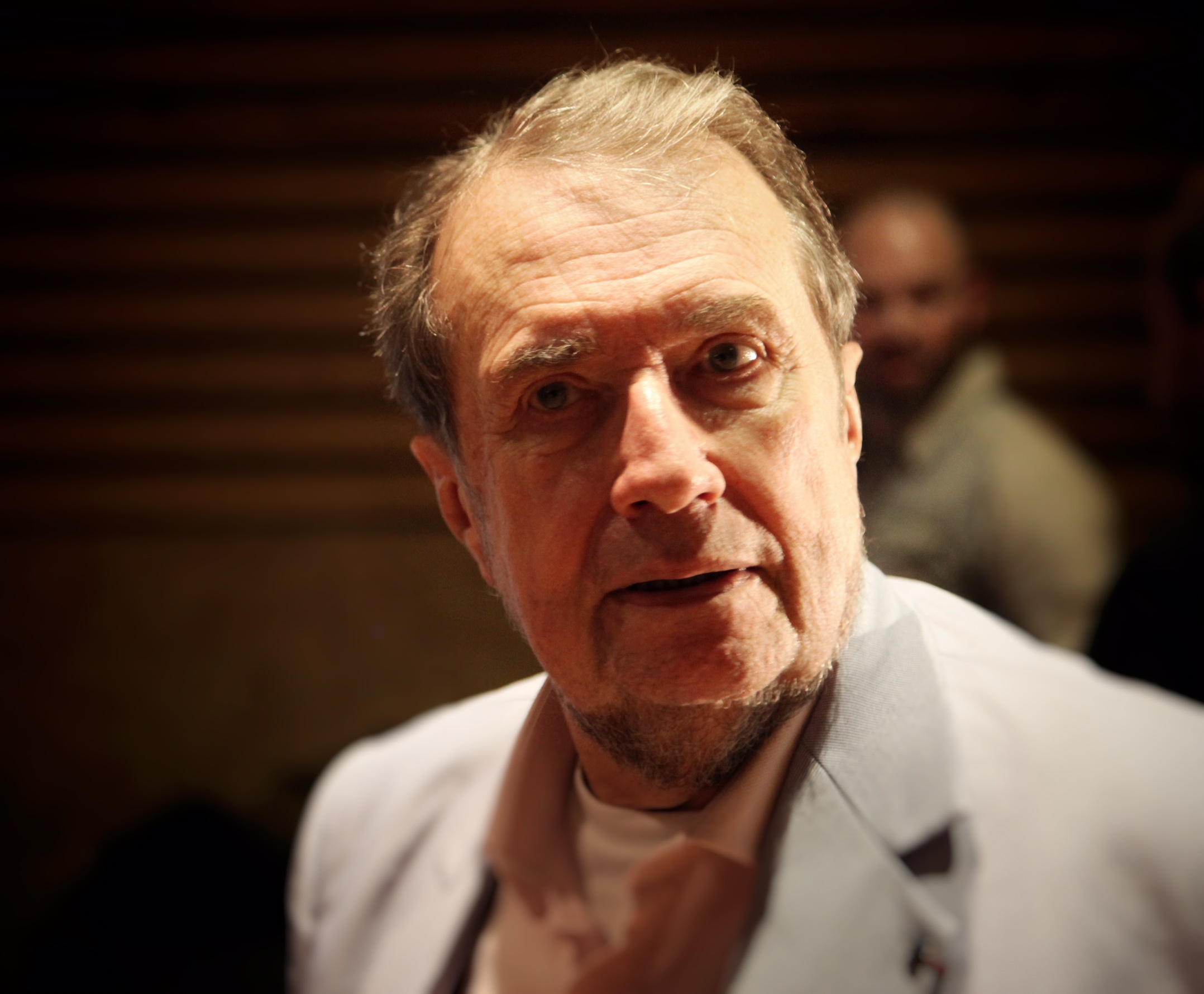
François Florent in 2015

François Florent, stage name of François Eichholtzer (30 April 1937 – 27 September 2021) was a French theater actor. He was the founder of the eponymous drama school Cours Florent, the alumni of which include Isabelle Adjani and Audrey Tautou.

He was married to actress Martine Grimaud.
