= Emily Atef =

French-Iranian filmmaker

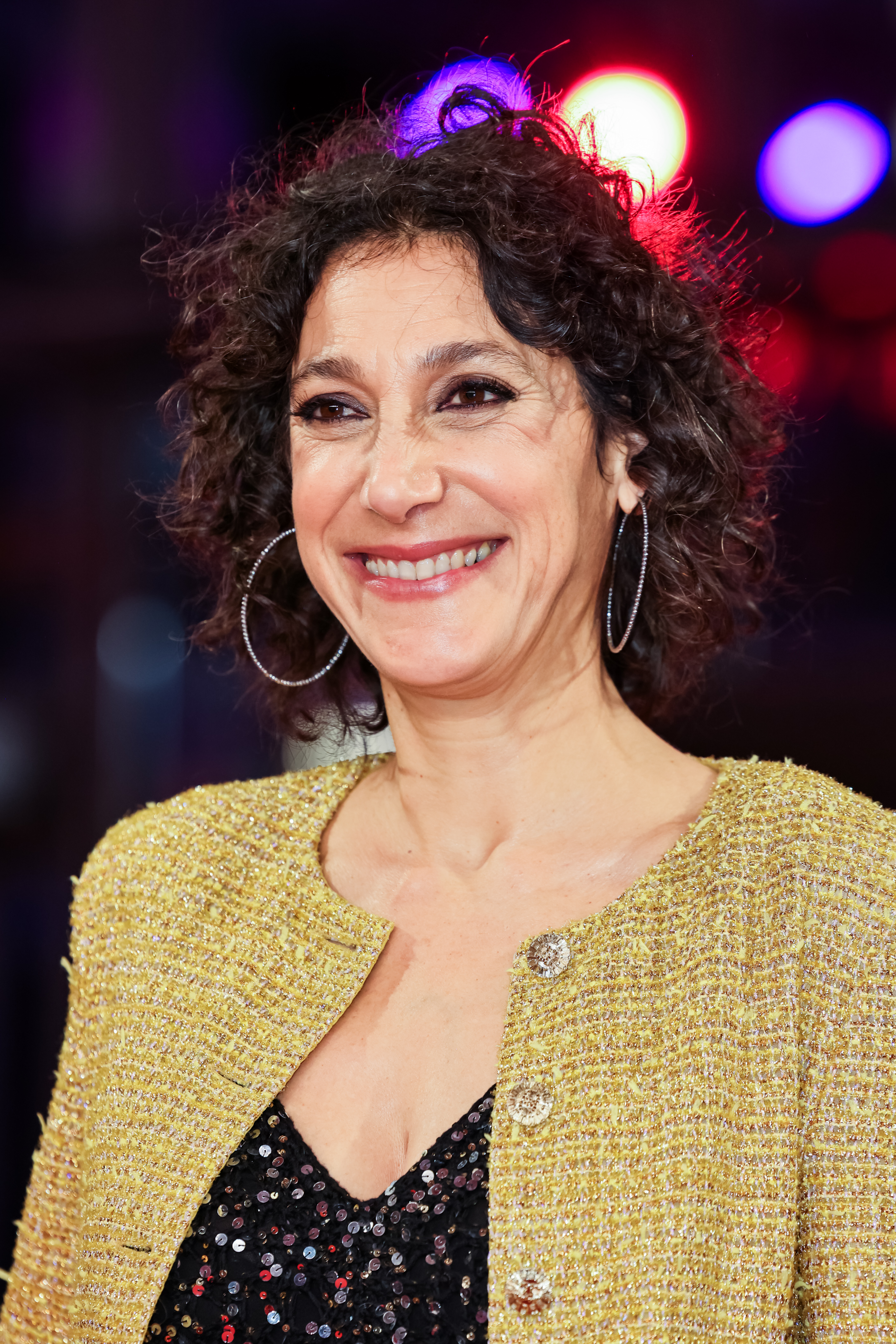
- Atef at the 2023 Berlin International Film Festival
- Born: 6 May 1973 (age 53); West Berlin, West Germany
- Occupations: Director; screenwriter; actress
- Years active: 2002–present

Emily Atef (Persian: امیلی عاطف; born May 6, 1973) is a German-born French-Iranian filmmaker, most known for her films 3 Days in Quiberon (2018) and More Than Ever (2022).

== Early life ==
At the age of 7, Atef moved from West Berlin to Los Angeles with her French-Iranian parents and her brother, the drummer Cyril Atef. She was 13 when they moved to France, where Atef finished school; later she moved to London to work as an actor in the London theater scene. Atef returned to Berlin to study film direction at the Deutsche Film- und Fernsehakademie Berlin (DFFB).

== Career ==
While finishing her studies at the DFFB, Atef directed her first feature-length film Molly's Way which, like her 2 following feature films was co-authored by Esther Bernstorff. The film won the esteemed Newcomer Award at the Munich International Film Festival (Filmfest München) for best script and the Grand Jury Award at the Mar del Plata Film Festival, among several other awards. Her second feature-length film Das Fremde in mir (The Stranger in Me) had its world premiere at the prestigious International Critics' Week of the Cannes Film Festival. and won numerous awards. For the development of her third feature film, Töte Mich (Kill Me), she received a scholarship from the Cinéfondation of the Cannes Film Festival. The film was distributed by Les Films du Losange.

Atef's next project for the big screen was 3 Days in Quiberon. Written and directed by Atef, it depicts three emotional days for one of Europe's biggest stars and icons, Romy Schneider. 3 Days in Quiberon had its world premiere in the competition section of the 68th Berlin International Film Festival and competed for the Golden Bear. 3 Days in Quiberon was the big winner at the German Academy Awards in 2018 taking home seven Lolas: The Golden Lola for Best Film as well as statuettes for Best Director for Atef, Lead Actress Marie Bäumer, Supporting Actors Birgit Minichmayr and Robert Gwisdek, DoP Thomas W. Kiennast, and Composers Christoph M. Kaiser and Julian Maas.

The film was followed by Atef's first French film, More Than Ever (Plus Que Jamais), starring Vicky Krieps and Gaspard Ulliel in his last cinematic role. The film premiered in the section Un Certain Regard at the 75th Cannes Film Festival. More Than Ever was critically acclaimed: Robert Abele for the Los Angeles Times wrote, "director and co-writer Emily Atef's thoughtful character study, anchored by one of the current film landscape's great actors, Phantom Thread's Vicky Krieps, is to eschew sentimentality and foreground a search for a new, unexplored peace." Writing for Indiewire, Steph Green said, "Atef bypasses the inevitable funeral and instead closes off with what is surely one of the best sex scenes in recent cinematic memory."

Someday We'll Tell Each Other Everything (German: Irgendwann werden wir uns alles erzählen) is Atef's first novel adaptation, based on the novel of the same name by Daniela Krien who also co-adapted the novel with Atef for the screen. The film starring Marlene Burow and Felix Kramer is set in the summer of 1990 in the former East Germany, and follows a young woman who begins a relationship with a charismatic horse breeder twice her age. It was selected to compete for the Golden Bear at the 73rd Berlin International Film Festival, where it had its world premiere on 17 February 2023.

Atef's prolific body of work also contains several films for TV and streaming, among them TV dramas Wunschkinder written by the Grimme-Preis winner Dorothee Schön and produced by X Filme Creative Pool, Königin der Nacht (Queen of the Night) and Macht euch keine Sorgen (Don't worry, I'm fine). She was also responsible for the black comedy episode for Germany's oldest and most acclaimed crime series Tatort, Tatort: Falscher Hase (Run Rabbit Run) that she co-wrote and directed, inspired by the Coen Brothers' film Fargo. Shortly after she directed the thriller Jackpot, nominated for the renowned German TV award Goldene Kamera.

In 2022, Atef directed 2 episodes of the 4th and last season of the black comedy series Killing Eve, Episode 5 Don't Get Attached. and Episode 6 Oh Goodie, I'm the Winner, which was the best-rated episode of the season.

Atef co-wrote and directed Call Me Queen a bold feature film set in Kenya that confronts the AIDS crisis of the 1990s through a gripping story of women from the Global South standing up against injustice. Featuring a striking blend of local and international talent, the film is currently in post-production. Set against the backdrop of late 1990s Nairobi, it follows a Rwandan woman and an Irish journalist as they take on the powerful forces at the heart of the crisis, in a story of courage, defiance, and female empowerment. The film is expected to reach cinemas by the end of 2026.

== Favourite films ==
In 2022, Atef participated in the Sight & Sound film polls of that year. It is held every ten years to select the greatest films of all time, by asking contemporary directors to select ten films of their choice.

Atef selections were:

- A Woman Under the Influence (1974)
- The Decalogue (1989)
- La ciénaga (2001)
- Melancholia (2011)
- Örökbefogadas (1975)
- Crimson Gold (2003)
- Sátántangó (2016)
- Elena (2011)
- Timbuktu (2014)
- Woman in the Dunes (1964)

== Filmography ==
=== Feature films ===
Year	English title	Original title	Notes
2005	Molly's Way		
2008	The Stranger in Me	Das Fremde in mir	
2012	Kill Me	Töte mich	
2018	3 Days in Quiberon	3 Tage in Quiberon	
2022	More Than Ever	Plus que jamais	
2023	Someday We'll Tell Each Other Everything	Irgendwann werden wir uns alles erzählen	
2026	Call Me Queen		

=== Short films ===
- XX to XY: Fighting to Be Jake (2002)

=== Only actress ===
- Marseille (2004)

=== Television ===
Year	Title	Notes
2015	Queen of the Night	TV film
2016	Wunschkinder	TV film
2017	Don't Worry, I'm Fine	TV film
2019	Tatort: Falscher Hase	TV series episode
2020	Jackpot	TV film
2022	Killing Eve	2 TV series episodes

== Accolades ==
- An advancement award for Molly's Way
- German Independence Awards for The Stranger in Me
- Otto Sprenger Award for The Stranger in Me
- Best Film at the German Film Awards for 3 Days in Quiberon
- Best Film Award at Cinemania Film Festival for More Than Ever
