= French Society of Cinematographers =

French association of professional cinematographers

Association française des directrices et directeurs de la photographie cinématographique
- AFC
- Founder: Henri Alekan, Raoul Coutard, Alain Derobe, Pierre-William Glenn, Georges Strouvé
- Type: Association loi de 1901
- Location: Paris
- Key people: Co-Presidents; Claire Mathon, Jean-Marie Dreujou General Secretary; Baptiste Magnien

The French Society of Cinematographers (French: Association française des directrices et directeurs de la photographie cinématographique), or the AFC (Note: Following in the model of the American Society of Cinematographers (ASC), the official abbreviations of cinematographers' professional associations are often composed of 3 letters, the last of which is "C", as in the English word Cinematographer: British Society of Cinematographers (BSC), Associazione Italiana Autori della Fotografia Cinematografica (AIC), etc. Therefore, the AFC writes its full name as follows: Association Française des directrices et directeurs de la photographie Cinématographique.) for short, is France's foremost professional organization of French cinematographers. Founded in 1990 by Henri Alekan, Raoul Coutard, Alain Derobe, Pierre-William Glenn, and Georges Strouvé, who were soon joined by Eduardo Serra, Pierre Lhomme, and Robert Alazraki, the AFC today has 179 members.

The AFC receives financial support from the Centre national de la cinématographie, and is a co-founder of Imago, The European Federation of Cinematographers.

Its headquarters are located at 8, rue Francœur in the 18e arrondissement of Paris, next to the Fémis cinema academy.

== Members of the Board of Directors for 2023 ==
- Claire Mathon, Jean-Marie Dreujou, President.e
- Nathalie Durand, Gilles Porte, attached to the Presidency
- Baptiste Magnien, General Secretary
- Yves Cape, Treasurer
- Pascale Marin, Attached to relations with Associates Members

== Activities ==
- The AFC publishes a journal entitled Lumières.
- The AFC drew up the Charte de l'image
- The AFC partner with French manufactures of cinematographic equipment.
- Every year, the AFC hosts its annual trade fair, the Micro Salon, in Paris, where equipment manufacturers, service providers, and users gather to discuss cinematographic innovations.
- Every year, the AFC hosts the Journées AFC de la Postproduction
- The AFC participates in the Cannes Film Festival, and organizes professional events on an international scale at its stand, the Pavillon de l'Image.
- The AFC publishes original interviews granted by cinematographers whose films have been selected by the Festival.
- The AFC publishes its monthly la AFC Newsletter.
- The AFC has created and maintains Le CinéDico, a thematic multilingual dictionary for cinematographic and audiovisual terminology, with translations in French, English, German, Chinese, Spanish, Italian, Polish, Portuguese, and Russian.
- The AFC hosts the French Society of Cinematographers Awards annually since 2024.
