= Eighty Years of Book Cover Design =

2009 book by Joseph Connolly

- First edition
- Author: Joseph Connolly
- Language: English
- Publisher: Faber and Faber
- Publication date: 2009
- Publication place: United Kingdom

Eighty Years of Book Cover Design is a 2009 book by Joseph Connolly published by Faber and Faber. It illustrates the distinctive cover designs used by Faber over the years.
