= Ultimatum (2009 film) =

2009 French-Israeli-Italian drama film

- Film poster
- Directed by: Alain Tasma
- Screenplay by: Alain Tasma; Valérie Zenatti
- Based on: En retard pour la guerre by Valérie Zenatti
- Produced by: Thomas Anargyros; Édouard de Vésinne
- Starring: Gaspard Ulliel; Jasmine Trinca; Michel Boujenah; Anna Galiena; Sarah Adler; Hana Laszlo; Lior Ashkenazi
- Cinematography: Dominique Bouilleret
- Edited by: Marie-Sophie Dubus
- Music by: Cyril Morin
- Production companies: Cipango; Lama Films; Film Kairos; Studio 37; France 3 Cinéma
- Distributed by: Mars Distribution
- Release date: 30 September 2009 (France)
- Running time: 102 minutes
- Countries: France; Israel; Italy
- Languages: French; Hebrew; Italian; English

Ultimatum is a 2009 French-Israeli-Italian drama film co-written and directed by Alain Tasma, starring Gaspard Ulliel and Jasmine Trinca. The film was released in France on 30 September 2009 by Mars Distribution.

== Plot ==
1990, New Year's Eve; the United Nations calls the United Nations called on Iraq to withdraw its soldiers from Kuwait on pain of NATO military intervention. In the West, people imagine the possibility of a third world war, while in Jerusalem, there are concerns about chemical and biological weapons.

Luisa, a 23-year-old Franco-Italian, studies ancient history in Jerusalem. Nathanaël, also 23, is a painter and works as a security guard in East Jerusalem. As Saddam Hussein threatens to launch SCUD missiles at Israel, the young couple deals with the ramifications of world events on their relationship.

== Cast ==
- Gaspard Ulliel as Nathanaël
- Jasmine Trinca as Luisa
- Michel Boujenah as Victor
- Anna Galiena as Rachel
- Sarah Adler as Tamar
- Hana Laszlo as Bella
- Lior Ashkenazi as Gil
