= Strayed (2003 film) =

2003 film

Strayed (Les Égarés)
- Theatrical release poster
- Directed by: André Téchiné
- Screenplay by: Gilles Taurand; André Téchiné
- Based on: Le Garçon aux yeux gris by Gilles Perrault
- Produced by: Adam Betteridge
- Starring: Emmanuelle Béart; Gaspard Ulliel; Grégoire Leprince-Ringuet
- Cinematography: Agnès Godard
- Edited by: Martine Giordano
- Music by: Philippe Sarde
- Distributed by: Mars Distribution
- Release dates: 16 May 2003 (Cannes); 20 August 2003 (France)
- Running time: 95 minutes
- Country: France
- Language: French
- Budget: €5.3 million
- Box office: $482,757

Strayed (French: Les Égarés) is a 2003 French drama film directed by André Téchiné, starring Emmanuelle Béart and Gaspard Ulliel. The plot follows a widowed mother, who escaping occupied Paris with her two young children during World War II, finds shelter with an itinerant teenager at an abandoned rural house. The film is an adaptation of Gilles Perrault's novel The Boy With Grey Eyes (Le Garçon aux yeux gris).

== Plot ==
In June 1940, as German troops are advancing on Paris, Odile, an attractive widow in her late thirties, joins the exodus from the city with her two children: 13-year-old Philippe and 7-year-old Cathy. Like many others, they are heading south in a long line of refugees escaping Paris by whatever means of transport possible. After fifty kilometers, German planes bomb the choked road filled with civilians. Odile's car is destroyed and in the chaos, she runs from the roadside fields into the nearby woods, looking for shelter. They are helped by a shaven-headed wiry teenager, Yvan, who recommends that they continue off-road.

Resourceful and fiercely independent, Yvan, who is seventeen, can hunt and knows his way around the forest, so he can be of big help to Odile and her children. Odile regards this enigmatic scamp with overt suspicion, but Yvan charms Cathy and especially Philippe, who admires his rogue self-sufficiency and take-charge attitude. Afraid that Yvan will leave them, Philippe bribes him to stay, using his late father's watch as an inducement. After a night in the open, the four fugitives stumble upon a large house. Yvan unhesitatingly breaks in. Odile just would like to make a phone call, but Yvan convinces them all that the abandoned house is a safe and comfortable refuge from the war, at least temporarily. As he goes inside, Yvan cuts the phone lines and hides an existing radio, before opening the door to the others, ensuring their isolation from what is happening in the outside world..

An almost idyllic peaceful life follows for the four refugees, away from the war around them. The house is large and comfortable and as Odile soon discovers it was a country retreat owned by a Jewish married couple of musicians who left for abroad. Odile takes on house chores providing a sense of normalcy for her children. Her husband was killed recently fighting the Germans and she, a former school teacher, was ill prepared by the subsequent upheavals created by the war.

With time, Odile's suspicions about the young stranger begin to fade away, as Yvan makes himself indispensable providing food. Knowing the countryside and its dangers well, he hunts rabbits and catches fish from a nearby river during the day; at night he makes excursions to retrieve objects from dead soldiers and provisions from abandoned homes. Cathy enjoys his company and Philippe admires him as an ideal older brother, but when Yvan finds a gun and grenade, Odile hides it from him. Philippe refuses to tell Yvan where it is and they quarrel. Realizing that Yvan is illiterate, Odile begins to teach him how to read and write. She begins to open up to him, but Yvan does not give much information about his past only that he was orphaned and it is evident that he was in a reformatory. As he lays aside his brash attitude, he confesses to her that he loves her and wishes to become her husband. She is surprised and bemused, but flattered.

Days later, two French soldiers named Georges and Robert arrive leaving the war. There has been an armistice. Odile provides the soldiers with food and shelter but Yvan, who hides from them, does not trust them. Certain that they want to rape Odile, he intends to kill them, but ends up hitting Philippe when he tries to stop him. Yvan decides to stay away. At night Odile walks out of the house where the soldiers sleep to find Yvan. They make love passionately, since he does not know any other way, they have anal sex. As he is hungry, Yvan leaves to find something to eat. He promises to come back the next day and celebrate the soldier's departure.

The next morning policemen arrive at the house, having caught Yvan stealing. The clothing Yvan was wearing led the police to the abandoned house. Yvan and Odile remain silent, but Philippe confesses that they know him, he is their friend. Odile then tells the police how the young man helped them.

Sometime later Odile and her children are seen with many others in a camp for refugees. The policeman approaches Odile in private. He wants to see if she has more information about Yvan, but she lies and tells him that he never even mentioned his name. The policeman bluntly informs her that her friend committed suicide by hanging the night before. Yvan's real name was Jean Delmas, a fugitive from a reformatory in Mettray. When Philippe asks his mother about Yvan, Odile lies and says that he escaped.

== Cast ==
- Emmanuelle Béart as Odile
- Gaspard Ulliel as Jean Delmas alias Yvan
- Grégoire Leprince-Ringuet as Philippe
- Clémence Meyer as Cathy
- Samuel Labarthe as Robert
- Jean Fornerod as Georges
- Eric Kreikenmayer as The guard

== Production ==
Strayed (Les Égarés), Téchiné's fifteenth film, was a commissioned project. Jean Ramsay Levi of FIT productions had the idea to make a film from Gilles Perrault's short novel The Boy With Grey Eyes (Le Garçon aux yeux gris) published in 2001. It is Téchiné's first literary adaptation. The script was written by Téchiné with his longtime collaborator Gilles Taurand.

There are some notable differences between the film and the novel. In the book Odile belongs to the upper class while in the movie she is a school teacher. The father is dead, unlike in the novel. Téchiné and Taurand made an emphasis in the period in the house and made its owners Jewish musicians. In Perrault's narration the soldiers are threatening brutes and Odile is rescued to be raped by Yvan. The soldiers in the film are a pair basically just trying to make their way home from the war. Perrault's story was in many respects autobiographical, based on his own memories of the exodus from Paris in June 1940 when he, age nine, like Philippe in the film, had to escape to the south with his mother and his younger sister.

Filming took place in the Tarn department, including in the villages of Sorèze and Arfons, as well as in the Lacaune Mountains near Murat-sur-Vèbre.

== Reception ==
Strayed premiered at the 2003 Cannes Film Festival. In France it was well received by critics.

Review agreagator Rotten Tomatoes reported that 73% of critics gave the film positive reviews, based on 59 reviews, with an average rating of 6.6/10. The website's critical consensus reads, "Understated but compelling wartime drama". Metacritic reported the film had an average score of 70 out of 100, based on 27 reviews, indicating "generally favorable reviews".

In his review for Los Angeles Times, Kevin Thomas wrote: "What makes this film special, as in his other films, is the getting there. Téchiné is the master of subtle shifts in mood, an acute delineator of psychological interplay, and therefore demands the utmost of his actors." Dennis Lim, writing for The Village Voice, said that "As with Téchiné's best work, Strayed is a peculiar, lingering blend of robustness and delicacy — a movie with hardly a single wasted frame, incongruous word, or false gesture." Influential film critic Roger Ebert described Strayed as "a film about the nature of male and female, about middle-class values and those who cannot afford them, about how helpless we can be when the net of society is broken." In Variety, David Stratton commented that, with Strayed, "Techine creates a considerable degree of suspense with minimal ingredients here, and he has been judicious in his casting choices." Lisa Schwarzbaum from Entertainment Weekly gave the film a favorable review describing it as "beautifully ambiguous, exquisitely underplayed".

== Accolades ==
Award / Film Festival	Category	Recipients and nominees	Result
Cannes Film Festival	Palme d'Or		Nominated
César Awards	Most Promising Actor	Gaspard Ulliel	Nominated
César Awards	Most Promising Actor	Grégoire Leprince-Ringuet	Nominated
César Awards	Best Cinematography	Agnès Godard	Nominated
César Awards	Best Sound	Olivier Goinard, Jean-Pierre Laforce, Jean-Paul Mugel	Nominated
