= Alain Defossé =

French novelist and translator (1957–2017)

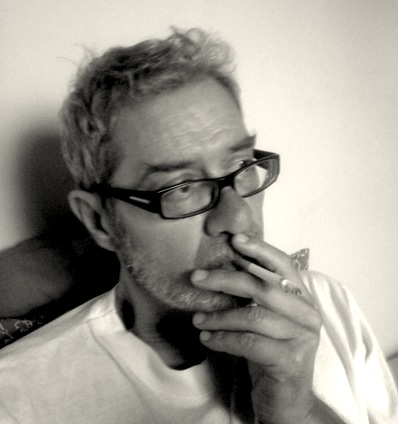
- Alain Defossé in 2014
- Born: 11 February 1957; Nantes, France
- Died: 14 May 2017 (aged 60); Paris, France
- Education: Cours Florent
- Occupations: Novelist, translator

Alain Defossé (11 February 1957 – 14 May 2017) was a French novelist and translator.

== Early life ==
Alain Defossé was born on 11 February 1957 in Nantes. Early on, he was interested in music, jazz in particular, and also cinema, and he studied at the Cours Florent in Paris.

== Career ==
Defossé authored nine novels. His first novel, Les fourmis d'Anvers, was published in 1991. He also translated several books from English into French. For example, he translated Crazy Cock by Henry Miller in 1990. He also translated American Psycho by Bret Easton Ellis in 1993. In 2006, he translated The Night Watch by Sarah Waters. Two years later, in 2008, he translated Rant by Chuck Palahniuk. Other novelists whose work he translated are Irvine Welsh and Joseph Connolly.

In his books L'Homme en habit [The Man in Clothes] and On ne tue pas les gens [We Don't Kill People], Defossé discusses his homosexuality, telling an interviewer in 2015: "my books are, generally speaking, made up of disparate elements that I have kept, consciously or not, in a secret drawer and which, at a certain moment, reappear and aggregate until they form a story and a book ... in my novels, there are also a lot of ghosts, which are certainly my ghosts, but which are also ghosts which belong only to themselves".

== Death ==
Defossé died on 14 May 2017 in Paris.

== Novels ==
- — (1991). Les fourmis d'Anvers. Paris: Salvy. ISBN 9782905899200. OCLC 781205279.
- — (1996). Retour à la ville. Paris: Salvy.
- — (2000). Dimanche au Mont Valérien. Nantes: Joca seria. ISBN 9782908929737. OCLC 45647184.
- — (2004). Dans la douceur du soir. Paris: PARC. ISBN 9782912010216. OCLC 470117289.
- — (2006). Chien de cendres. Paris: Éditions du Panama. ISBN 9782755701234. OCLC 470515837.
- — (2007). L'Homme en habit. Monaco: Éditions du Rocher.
- — (2011). Mes inconnues : Solange, Denise, Mado. Paris: Phébus. ISBN 9782752904942. OCLC 697265036.
- — (2012). On ne tue pas les gens. Paris: Flammarion. ISBN 9782081255852. OCLC 785327115.
- — (2015). Effraction. Paris: Fayard. ISBN 9782213687025. OCLC 976502106.
