= Cours Florent =

French drama school in Paris

Coordinates: 48°53′02″N 2°22′24″E

- Type: Private
- Founder: François Florent
- President: Frédéric Montfort
- Students: 2,500
- Location: Paris, France; Brussels, Belgium; Montpellier, France; Bordeaux, France
- Language: French, English
- Website: coursflorent.education

The Cours Florent is a private drama school in Paris, France, established in 1967 by French theater actor François Florent.

== Location ==
The school's facilities are located on three sites in the 19th arrondissement of Paris: Rue Archereau, Rue Mathis, and Avenue Jean-Jaurès. The Cours Florent also has satellite campuses in Brussels, Belgium; Montpellier, France; and Bordeaux, France.

== Programs ==
The Cours Florent is known as one of France's most prestigious drama schools. It offers a three-year acting and theatre program for children, teenagers, and adults.

In addition to its traditional acting programme, Cours Florent offers a range of specialised courses, including stand-up comedy, musical theatre, artistic project management, improvisation and performance, and songwriting and performing.

Since 2011 through a partnership with Regent's University London, Cours Florent also offers students the opportunity to earn a Bachelor of Arts with Honours, a three-year degree programme taught in French and English for both French and foreign English-speaking students. Auditions take place in May and September, and two intensive summer programs are available in July and August.

The school also hosts a specialized class to prepare students for the competitive examination of the prestigious Conservatoire national supérieur d'Art dramatique de Paris (CNSAD), as well as the École nationale supérieure des arts et techniques du théâtre (ENSATT) in Lyon and the École supérieure d'art dramatique of the National Theatre of Strasbourg.

Many renowned actors and acting teachers have taught classes at the Cours Florent, including Francis Huster, Olivier Marchal, Gilles Lellouche, and alumni Diane Kruger, Gad Elmaleh, Guillaume Canet, and Jacques Weber.

== Notable alumni ==
Many notable actors, French and foreign, have graduated or attended the Cours Florent:

- Isabelle Adjani
- Morjana Alaoui
- Yvan Attal
- Daniel Auteuil
- Édouard Baer
- Jeanne Balibar
- Malik Bentalha
- Dominique Blanc
- Guillaume Canet
- Jil Caplan (teacher)
- Isabelle Carré
- Cecil Castellucci
- Nicolas Cazalé
- Pauline Chalamet
- Anne Consigny
- Clotilde Courau
- Jean-Pierre Darroussin
- Alain Defossé
- Cyril Descours
- Emmanuelle Devos
- Guillaume de Tonquédec
- Marie de Villepin
- Vincent Elbaz
- Gad Elmaleh
- Mylène Farmer
- Stéphane Freiss
- Thierry Frémont
- Guillaume Gallienne
- José Garcia
- Olivier Gourmet
- Eva Green
- Marina Hands
- Francis Huster (teacher)
- Agnès Jaoui
- Pom Klementieff
- Yael Michal
- Diane Kruger
- Samuel Le Bihan
- Vincent Lindon
- Luce
- Sophie Marceau
- Ali Marhyar
- Noémie Merlant
- Thierry Mugler
- Pierre Niney
- Jérôme Pradon
- Cristiana Reali
- Muriel Robin
- Sebastian Roché
- Jean-Paul Rouve
- Éric Ruf
- Mathilde Seigner
- Audrey Tautou
- Gaspard Ulliel
- Arnaud Valois
- Tasha de Vasconcelos
- Jacques Weber
- Elia Zaharia
- Océane Zhu
- Elsa Zylberstein
