= Le Premier Cercle =

Film by Laurent Tuel

- Original release poster
- Directed by: Laurent Tuel
- Written by: Laurent Tuel; Laurent Turner; Simon Moutaïrou
- Produced by: Alain Terzian; Christine Gozlan
- Starring: Jean Reno; Gaspard Ulliel; Vahina Giocante; Sami Bouajila
- Cinematography: Laurent Machuel
- Edited by: Marion Monestier
- Music by: Alain Kremski
- Production companies: Alter Films; Thelma Films; TF1 International; TF1 Films Production; Medusa Film
- Distributed by: TFM Distribution
- Release date: 4 March 2009
- Running time: 94 minutes
- Country: France
- Languages: French; Armenian
- Budget: €15 million
- Box office: $2,322,421

Le Premier Cercle (French pronunciation: [lə pʁəmje sɛʁkl], The First Circle), also known as Inside Ring and The Dead List in English and as Ultimate Heist on USA video, is a 2009 French-language film by Laurent Tuel.

It tells the story of Milo Malakian (Jean Reno), a gang leader in France, and his son Anton, the descendants of Armenian genocide survivors.

Having been co-produced by Thelma Films and Alter Films, this thriller formerly called Riviera was co-written by the scriptwriters Laurent Tuel, Laurent Turner and Simon Moutaïrou.

Production companies include TF1 and Canal+.

According to producer Alain Terzian, the surname of the film's hero, Malakian, was chosen in regard of film director Henri Verneuil, a friend of Terzian.

== Cast ==
- Jean Reno as Milo Malakian
- Gaspard Ulliel as Anton Malakian
- Vahina Giocante as Elodie
- Sami Bouajila as Saunier
