= Marie Bäumer =

German actress (born 1969)

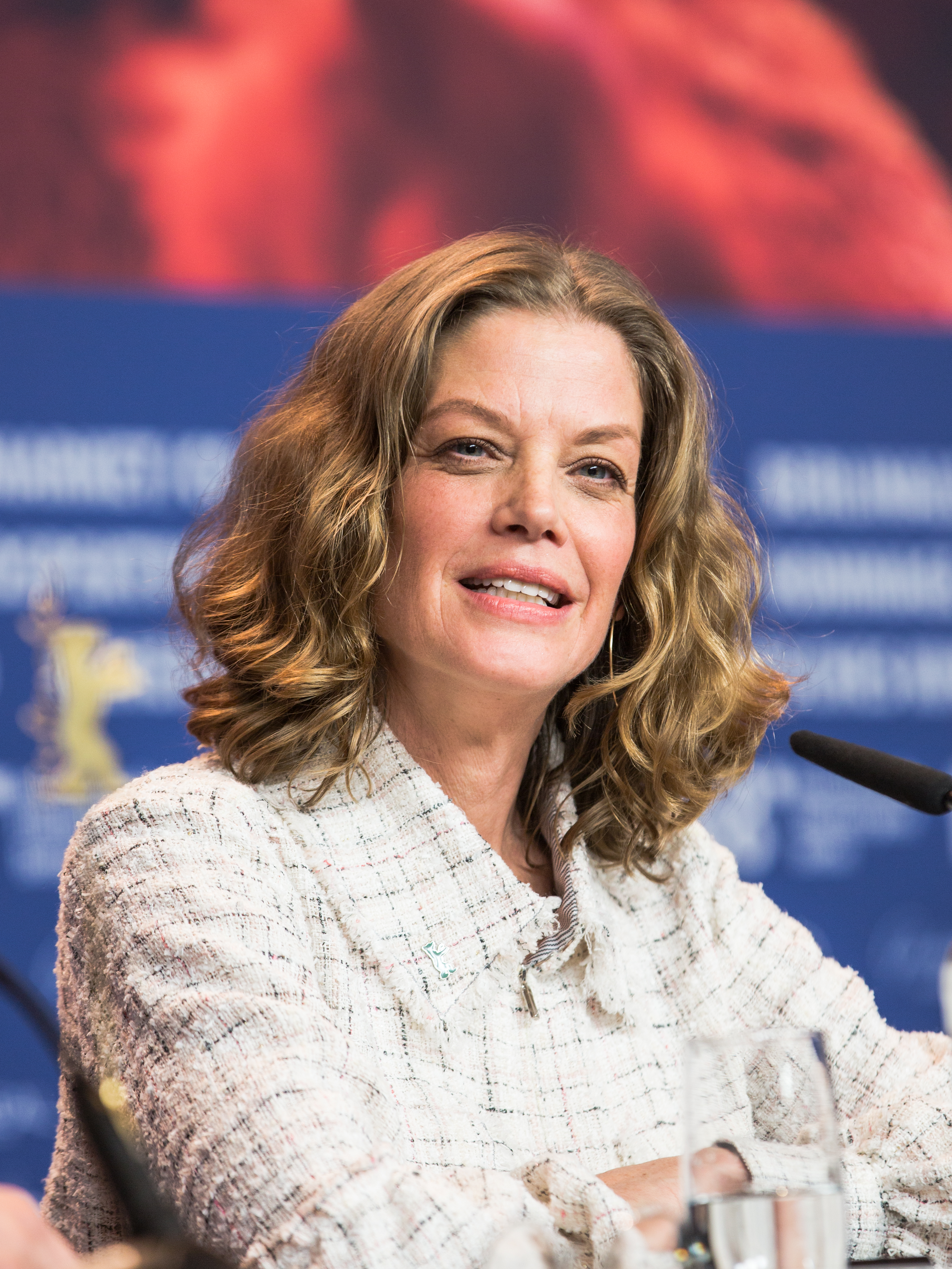
- Bäumer at the Berlinale 2018
- Born: Henrike Marie Bäumer; 7 May 1969 (age 56); Düsseldorf, North Rhine-Westphalia, West Germany (now Germany)
- Education: Hamburg University of Music and Theatre
- Occupation: Actress
- Years active: 1993–2018
- Children: 1

Henrike Marie Bäumer (German: [ma.ˈʁiː ˈbɔɪ̯.mɐ]; born 7 May 1969) is a German actress. She won two Bavarian Film Awards for her performances in Angst (2003) and 3 Days in Quiberon (2018). For her portrayal of Romy Schneider in the latter, she also won a German Film Award and was nominated for a European Film Award.

== Selected filmography ==
Year	Title	Role	Director	Notes
1995	Das Schwein – Eine deutsche Karriere	Rita Krüger	Ilse Hofmann	TV miniseries
1996	Jailbirds	Emilia Bauer	Detlev Buck	
1998	Night Time	Alexandra	Peter Fratzscher	
1999	Latin Lover	Anna Glaser	Oskar Roehler	TV film
2001	She	Roxane	Timothy Bond	
2001	Der Schuh des Manitu	Uschi	Michael Herbig	
2001	Resurrection	Missy	Paolo and Vittorio Taviani	TV film
2002	Poppitz	Lena Schartl	Harald Sicheritz	
2002	Napoléon	Caroline Bonaparte	Yves Simoneau	TV miniseries
2003	Angst	Marie	Oskar Roehler	
2004	Home on the Range	Grace (voice)	Frank Lenart (German dub)	German dub
2006	Dresden	Maria Goldberg	Roland Suso Richter	TV film
2007	Armin	Gudrun	Ognjen Sviličić	
2008	10 Sekunden	Franziska Hofer	Nicolai Rohde	
2009	Sometime in August	Hanna	Sebastian Schipper	
2009	Haus und Kind	Lena Neubauer	Andreas Kleinert	TV film
2010	The Day of the Cat	Marie	Wolfgang Panzer	
2010	The Frontier	Nadine Manz	Roland Suso Richter	TV film
2010	Im Angesicht des Verbrechens	Stella	Dominik Graf	TV miniseries
2013	The Other Child	Leslie Cramer	Urs Egger	TV film
2013	Hotel Adlon: A Family Saga	Hedda Adlon	Uli Edel	TV miniseries
2013	A Pact	Anna	Denis Dercourt	
2013	Planes	Heidi (voice)	Benedikt Rabanus, Thomas Amper (German dub)	German dub
2013	The Taste of Apple Seeds	Inga	Vivian Naefe	
2014	Therapy Crashers	Sylvie	Anno Saul	
2015	En équilibre	Alexandra	Denis Dercourt	
2015	Letter to My Life	Toni	Urs Egger	TV film
2018	3 Days in Quiberon	Romy Schneider	Emily Atef	

== Awards ==
- Grimme-Preis (2011)
- Kitzbuehel Film Festival Honorary Award (2018)
