= The Princess of Montpensier (novella) =

1662 novel by Madame de La Fayette

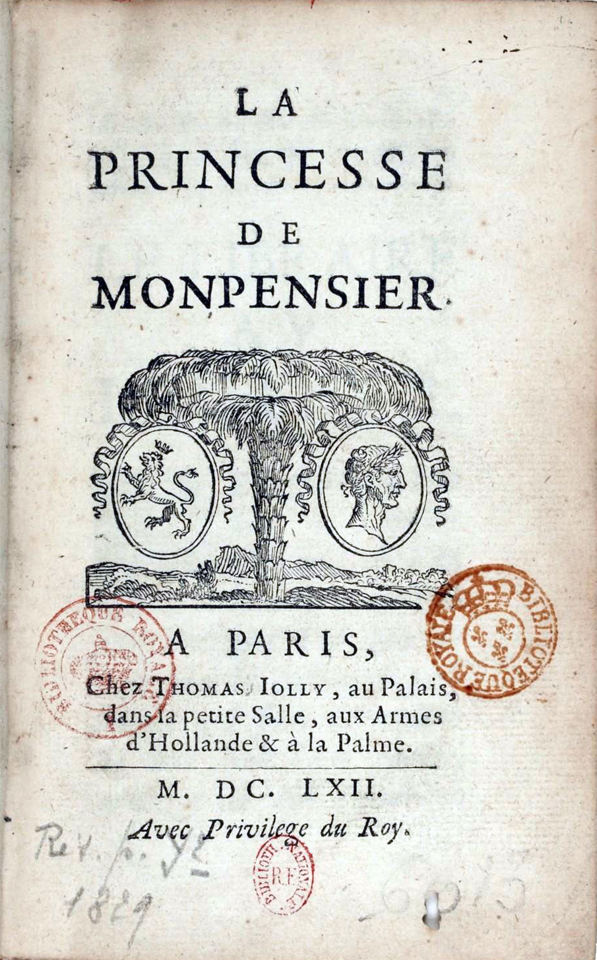
Frontispiece, first edition

The Princess of Montpensier is a short novel by Madame de La Fayette which came out anonymously in 1662 as her first published work. It is regarded not only as one of the first modern novels in French, but also as both the prototype and a masterpiece of the historical novel.

Set in France during the Wars of Religion, it tells the story of a young noblewoman, married without affection and loved platonically by her husband's best friend, who cannot refuse her former fiancé's impetuous brother and collapses under the emotional stress. Some of the characters are historical and some made up for the story.

== Plot ==
The intelligent and good-looking Renée d'Anjou-Mézières (Note: While the historical figure was named Renée, the novella omits her first name and refers to her only by her married name, as the Princess of Montpensier. In the 2010 film adaptation, she is rechristened Marie by the screenwriters.) is promised to the Duke of Mayenne, but she loves his brother, the Duke of Guise, who loves her back. Unfortunately, France becomes convulsed in the Wars of Religion and the leading families are forced to take sides. To the fury of Guise, her parents prefer an alliance with the powerful Montpensier family and she is married to the young Prince of Montpensier. As he has to go off to the wars, he leaves her at his castle in the care of the Count of Chabanes, his oldest and most trusted friend, who is to be her tutor. Chabanes soon falls in love with the girl and, being intrinsically honest, admits it to her. She says they must remain friends and nothing more.

Her peaceful life in the country is disrupted when two great men are riding across the estate and see her in a boat on the river. One is her former suitor Guise, who has not stopped wanting her, and the other is the heir to the throne, the Duke of Anjou. Determined to see more of her, Anjou invites himself and Guise to the castle, where Montpensier arrives as well to be their host. At the dinner table, the princess is surrounded by four men who desire her and, in the case of Montpensier and Guise, hate each other. When the Montpensiers are summoned to Paris, Guise tells Renée he still loves her while Anjou tries to win her favour. At a masked ball, the princess thinks she is talking to Guise and says how Anjou is pursuing her. In fact the man she whispered to was Anjou, who forms a deep hatred for Guise.

Suspicious, Montpensier orders his wife back to their castle and she then prevails on Chabanes, whom everybody trusts, to carry messages to and from Guise. This becomes dangerous when Montpensier returns to the castle. Through Chabanes, Guise says he must see Renée face to face and, when she agrees, Chabanes smuggles him into her bedroom. A noise wakes up Montpensier who, finding Renée 's bedroom door locked, in fury starts breaking it down. When he bursts in, he finds Chabanes standing calmly and the princess fainted on the tiled floor. Chabanes says things are not what they seem and that Renée, in a state of nervous collapse, needs putting to bed.

She never recovers from the shock. Chabanes is murdered by followers of Guise in the St. Bartholomew's Day massacre and Guise swiftly makes an advantageous marriage. When the princess hears the news, she dies unable to overcome the grief of having lost the respect of her husband, the heart of her lover, and the best friend there ever was.

== Major themes ==
Love versus duty is the overriding theme of the book. An attractive and thoughtful young woman is torn between her desire for another man and her responsibilities as a wife. In this, she prefigures both the author's later novel The Princess of Cleves and the tragic heroines in the plays of Jean Racine. Her fate reflects the danger of uncontrolled emotion in a strictly regulated society, where a woman's reputation is destroyed by perceived imprudence.

== Style ==
Compared with the floweriness and pomposity of much preceding French fiction, Madame de La Fayette writes in a pared-down prose which almost has the air of a dispassionate observer.

== Background ==
Novellas by Jean Regnault de Segrais pioneered what has become the modern French novel. Following Spanish models, he used a simple linear plot line and replaced artificial classical names with real French names. But he left locations vague, psychology inconsistent, and external events prevailed over internal emotions. Madame de La Fayette's developments in her first work were bold and unprecedented. The principal character is based on a real French woman in named places at a specific time in history, with her emotional trajectory described and analysed. Breaking away from the improbabilities of heroic and pastoral romances, believable characters live through the actual dramatic events of the period, recreated with accuracy, and it is their internal conflicts which are the subject of the novel.

== Publication history ==
The first edition, in octavo with 142 pages, was published anonymously by T. Jolly in Paris in 1662. Handwritten copies of the work had been circulating for some time before, leading the author to complain that the novella 'is racing all over the place, but happily not under my name'. Recent critical editions are:

- Cuénin, Micheline (ed.) Histoire de la Princesse de Montpensier sous le règne de Charles IXe Roi de France et Histoire de la Comtesse de Tende, Geneva, Droz, 1979.
- Esmein-Sarrazin, Camille (ed.) Madame de Lafayette, Œuvres complètes, Paris, Gallimard in the collection Bibliothèque de La Pléiade, 2014.

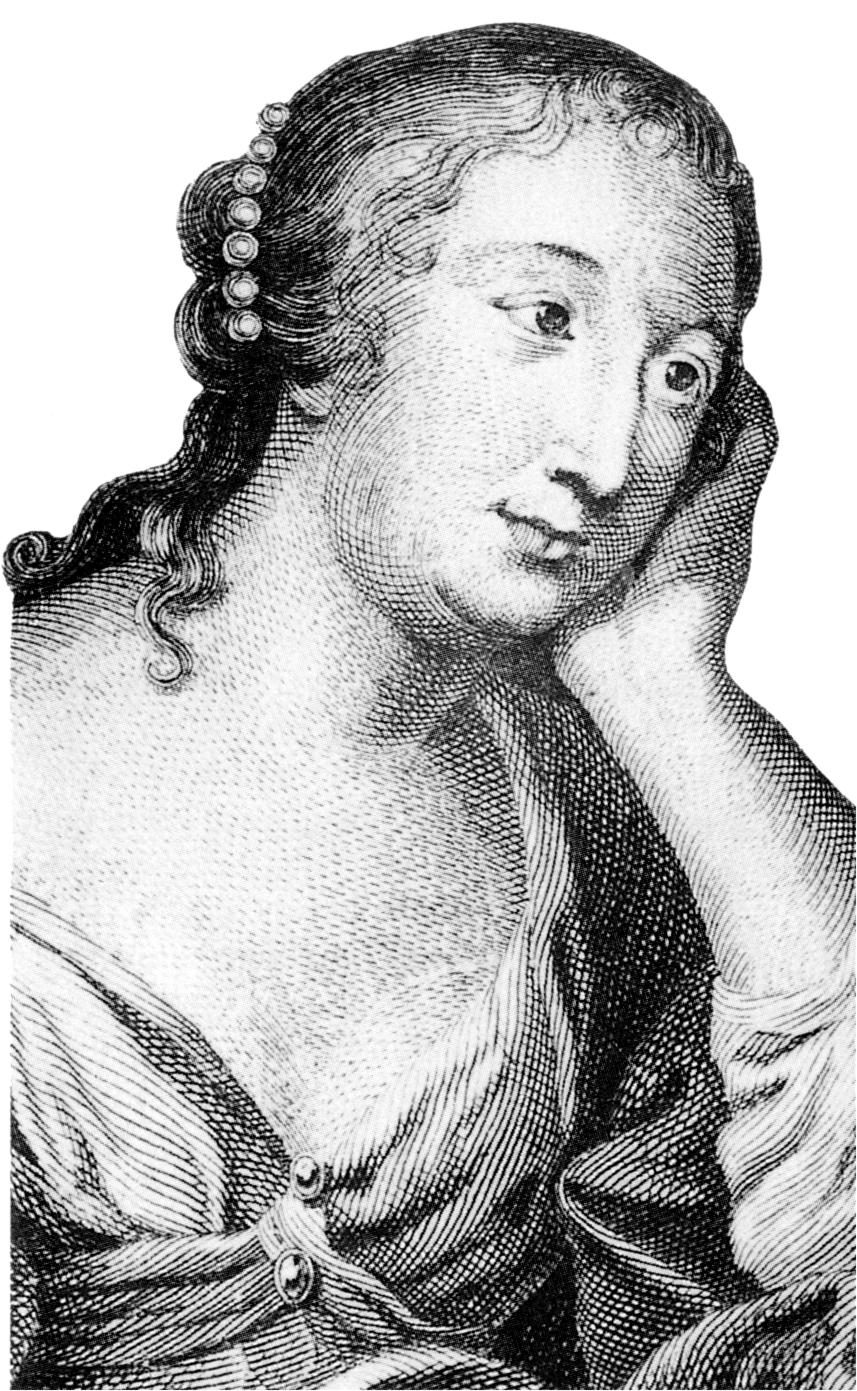
Madame de La Fayette

== Reception ==
After over 350 years the book is still widely read in France, where for the 2017–18 academic year it was a set book in the baccalauréat littéraire, the first time in the history of the examination that a work by a woman author had been included. Its inclusion made the book a core part of the syllabus, as one of the two major works studied in the school year.

== Adaptations ==
An adaptation for cinema was the 2010 film The Princess of Montpensier, directed by Bertrand Tavernier and scripted by him and Jean Cosmos from a treatment by François-Olivier Rousseau, which starred Mélanie Thierry as the conflicted heroine. The film was included alongside the novella in the French baccalauréat in order to offer a comparative analysis.
