= Joseph Connolly (author) =

English writer and bibliophile, born 1950

Joseph Connolly (born 23 March 1950) is an English journalist, novelist, and non-fiction writer.

== Biography ==
For many years he owned The Flask Bookshop in Hampstead, London. Having started writing fiction rather late in life, he is best known today for comic novels, especially in France, where they have been translated by Alain Defossé. He also contributes to The Times and other publications.

His son is Charles Connolly, a musician. The two live in Hampstead.

== Work ==
=== Novels ===
- Poor Souls (1995)
- This Is It (1996)
- Stuff (1997)
- Summer Things (1998) (filmed in France in 2002 by Michel Blanc as Embrassez qui vous voudrez starring Charlotte Rampling, Jacques Dutronc and Carole Bouquet)
- Winter Breaks (1999)
- It Can't Go On (2001)
- S.O.S. (2001)
- The Works (2003)
- Love Is Strange (2005)
- Jack the Lad and Bloody Mary (2007)
- England's Lane (2012)
- Boys and Girls (2014)
- Style (2015)
- This is 64 (2016)

Most of his novels were published by Faber and Faber. England's Lane, Boys and Girls, Style, and This is 64 were published by Quercus.

=== Non-fiction ===
- Collecting Modern First Editions (1975) (a standard work on book collecting)
- Modern First Editions: Their Value to Collectors (1984)
- Children's Modern First Editions: Their Value to Collectors (1988)
- P.G. Wodehouse (1979) (biography)
- Jerome K. Jerome (1982) (biography)
- Beside the Seaside (1999)
- All Shook Up: A Flash of the Fifties (2000)
- Christmas And How to Survive It: Laughter Matters (2003)
- Eighty Years of Book Cover Design (2008)
- The A-Z of Eating Out (2014)
