= Le Père Noël =

- Theatrical release poster
- Directed by: Alexandre Coffre
- Written by: Rachel Palmieri; Fabrice Carazzo; Alexandre Coffre; Laurent Zeitoun; Carol Noble; Yoann Gromb
- Produced by: Arnaud Bertrand; Dominique Boutonnat; Hubert Caillard; Nicolas Duval-Adassovsky; Laurent Zeitoun; Yann Zenou
- Starring: Tahar Rahim; Victor Cabal
- Cinematography: Pierre Cottereau
- Edited by: Hervé de Luze
- Music by: Klaus Badelt
- Production companies: Quad Productions; Atitlan; Mars Films; M6 Films; Kinology; La Compagnie Cinématographique; Panache Productions; Radio Télévision Belge Francophone; Proximus
- Distributed by: Mars Distribution
- Release date: 10 December 2014 (France)
- Running time: 80 minutes
- Countries: France; Belgium
- Language: French
- Budget: $10.8 million
- Box office: $3.5 million

Le Père Noël is a 2014 French-Belgian comedy film directed by Alexandre Coffre and starring Tahar Rahim and Victor Cabal.

== Plot ==
Six-year-old Antoine wishes for Christmas, in addition to lots of toys, to take Santa Claus on his sleigh ride so that he can visit his papa, who lives on a star in heaven - at least that's what his mother had always told him. When Antoine wakes up on Christmas night and looks up at the evening sky, a burglar suddenly lands on his balcony. Since he disguised himself as Santa Claus, the boy is convinced that his wish will now come true. But the man in the red and white coat simply climbs on to the next floor without admitting any presents. Of course that is not possible and Antoine climbs afterwards. The burglar tries everything to get rid of the boy, but he clings to him like a burr. When "Santa Claus" is unexpectedly checked by the police, he can quickly put his booty (coins and jewelry) in the boy's backpack so that he is not exposed. So the two stay together for the next few hours and the unequal couple moves through wintry Paris. Antoine is even "allowed" to help Santa Claus, because after a fall, "Santa's" climbing skills are limited and he uses the ignorant child for his own purposes. He owes someone money, which is why he inevitably uses this ruse. Antoine of course likes to be able to help "Santa Claus" and says he only has to steal the things so that Santa's sleigh can fly again. After a few break-ins, the couple threatens to be discovered and Antoine comes to the conclusion that this Santa Claus is probably not real after all. Antoine insists on bringing the things back. The burglar has developed a certain relationship with the boy over the course of the night and does not want to disappoint him, and since he actually stole everything because of his debts, he has an idea. He lures the man whom he had referred to Antoine as Knecht Ruprecht into a trap. He dumps the stolen goods under the Christmas tree of one of the families he stole with Antoine's help. This is now arrested by the police and "Santa Claus" brings Antoine back home, where his mother is still sleeping and had not noticed the absence of her boy.

Days later, Antoine goes to a toy store with his mother and meets the "burglar Santa Claus" there, but this time without a coat. They both look at each other and smile. Christmas can be so magical!

== Cast ==
- Tahar Rahim as Père Noël
- Victor Cabal as Antoine
- Annelise Hesme as Antoine's Mother
- Michaël Abiteboul as The bogeyman
- Charlie Dupont as The robbed
- Philippe Rebbot as Camille
- Amélie Glenn as Marie
- Steve Tran as Taxi driver

== See also ==
- List of Christmas films
