= François-Olivier Rousseau =

French journalist and writer (born 1947)

François-Olivier Rousseau (born 20 September 1947, Boulogne-Billancourt) is a French journalist and writer.

== Biography ==
A young literary critic at Le Matin de Paris at the end of the 1970s, he became a novelist, met with success immediately and collected several literary prizes. He then left Paris for the Isle of Man where he settled in the capital, Douglas, a town of barely more than 20,000 inhabitants. He devotes himself only to the writing between two voyages.

French detesting France, a specialist in the period from Napoleon III to the First World War (which he considers to be "an accident that is incomprehensible to me, I try to understand what could have provoked this manifestation of the death instinct of the West and I like to dream what would have been this century without the war"), he particularly likes to depict with many details the lives of artists going through this era.

The Éditions du Seuil published a novelization of the film he co-wrote, Children of the Century, devoted to the love affair between George Sand and Alfred de Musset.

== Bibliography ==
- 1977: Le Regard du voyageur, Stock
- 1981: L'Enfant d'Édouard, Mercure de France prix Médicis 1981
- 1985: Sébastien Doré, Mercure de France, prix Marcel Proust 1986, prix Bertrand de Jouvenel of the Académie française
- 1988:La Gare de Wannsee, Grasset, Grand prix du roman de l'Académie française 1988)
- 1991: Andrée Putman, Éditions du Regard
- 1991: Le Jour de l'éclipse, Grasset
- 1995: L'Heure de gloire, Grasset
- 1999: Les Enfants du siècle, Le Seuil
- 2001: Le Passeur, Stock
- 2003: Le Plaisir de la déception, Stock
- 2003: Grand Hôtel du Pacifique, Éditions du Rocher
- 2004: Princesse Marie, Le Seuil
- 2006: Le Faux Pli, Gallimard

== Filmography ==
as screenwriter:

- Children of the Century by Diane Kurys
- Absolument fabuleux by Gabriel Aghion
- Nuit noire 17 octobre 1961 by Alain Tasma
- Nathalie... by Anne Fontaine
- The Princess of Montpensier by Bertrand Tavernier
- Princesse Marie by Benoît Jacquot
