= Yves Cape =

Belgian cinematographer (born 1960)

Yves Cape (born November 1, 1960) is a Belgian cinematographer. He is a member of French Society of Cinematographers.

== Career ==
Yves Cape studied at the INSAS film school in Brussels. After having started out as an assistant he made his debut as cinematographer on short films in the 90s. His encounter with Alain Berliner on the short film Rose (1993) led to the signing for the photography of the feature Ma vie en rose. He has worked with notable film directors such as Bruno Dumont, Claire Denis, Patrice Chéreau, Cédric Kahn, Martin Provost, Bertrand Bonello and Guillaume Nicloux.

== Selected filmography ==
- 2011: Hors Satan
- 2011: The First Man
- 2011: Love Lasts Three Years
- 2012: Holy Motors
- 2013: Hadewijch
- 2013: The Nun
- 2014: Two Men in Town
- 2015: Chronic
- 2015: Call My Agent!
- 2016: The Wounded Angel
- 2016: Orphan
- 2017: The Midwife
- 2017: April's Daughter
- 2018: The Prayer
- 2018: Ad Vitam
- 2019: Twice Upon a Time
- 2019: Zombi Child
- 2019: Happy Birthday
- 2020: New Order
- 2021: Peaceful
- 2021: Sundown
- 2022: Un alibi
- 2022: Irréductible
- 2023: Memory
- 2025: Dreams

== Bibliography ==
- The information in this article is based on that in its French equivalent.
