= Leonid Kuzmin =

Belarusian pianist

Leonid Kuzmin is a Belarusian pianist.

He won the Belarusian State Competition and the Prague Competition before settling in the United States in the 1980s. He subsequently shared the 1991 Liszt-Bartók Competition's 2nd prize with Midori Nohara.
