= Jean-Marc Peillex =

French politician (born 1954)

Jean-Marc Peillex (born 1 May 1954) is a French local and regional politician from the DVD / Union of Democrats and Independents / Les Républicains, currently serving as Mayor of Saint-Gervais-les-Bains and Conseiller Général of the canton of Saint-Gervais, later Conseiller Départemental of the newly formed canton Mont-Blanc in the department of Haute-Savoie. In May 2014 he was re-elected for 6 years (until 2020).

He became known nationally and internationally by his long campaign for a regulation of the access to Mont Blanc, the highest summit of the Alps, via the popular Goûter Route which lies within his municipality.

== Campaign for regulation ==
For decades, overcrowding of the Goûter Hut and the Goûter Route became a growing problem during the summer months on Mont Blanc, more than elsewhere in the Alps, because of its implications for security and ecology, at a local level interacting with the global climate change affecting the mountain landscape and mountaineering, leading to more rockfall and crevasse forming by high-altitude permafrost degradation, which also attributed to a rise in the number of accidents with alpinists.

Because of these concerns, mountain tourism and the safety of public in the area became a controversial topic, and Peillex stood up as major spokesman about the issue, often addressed by the media requesting his comments after tragic fatal accidents and lurid incidents on the mountain.

As the accountable authority for the public order and safety in his municipality, Peillex campaigned during 15 years for regulation by means of a permit system in order to restrict the number of climbers attempting to summit the mountain via the Goûter Refuge, for both safety and ecological reasons, in his initiative “La Montagne à l'Etat Pur” (The Mountain in its purest state) to "responsibilitize" the climbers.

In the debate over his propositions, he accused the neighbouring municipality Chamonix-Mont Blanc of blocking attempts to regulate the crowds of climbers, allegedly it had “sacrificed Mont Blanc on the altar of money and turned it into a new Disneyland.”

In September 2006 Peillex hosted a public meeting to which he invited mountain guides, tour organisers and representatives of climbing organisations to discuss his ideas. He put forward some fairly radical propositions; an obligatory permit – of which the number issued would be restricted by the total capacity of the refuges of Tête Rousse and the New Goûter Hut): 210 per day. Or making it obligatory for climbers to hire a guide, in order to prevent overcrowding in the mountain huts and an increasing number of inexperienced and ignorant visitors risking their lives without the skills to climb the mountain.

== Summer of 2017 ==
On 21 June 2017, Spanish trail runner Kilian Jornet livestreamed on his Facebook page himself on the summit ridge of Mont Blanc on running shoes and dressed in t-shirt and shorts. This footage then became controversial when the "deadly summer" of 2017 resulted in a record number of victims, including two trail runners trying to imitate this stunt.

The second accident happened shortly after Peillex decided on 17 August to issue an order with immediate effect by which anyone who accessed the summit should carry adequate equipment.

He also launched a desperate rhetoric appeal to the French national government, taunting the passivity of president Macron and the responsible ministers Collomb (Interior) and Hulot (Ecology) in the debate.

To enforce the equipment regulations, on 25 August, the prefect of Haute-Savoie announced a reinforcement of the control at the Tête Rousse Hut on the mountain: gendarmes will check the equipment of climbers and dissuade those ill-equipped to pursue their goal.

In an interview with L'Express in August 2017, the Mayor believes that Mont Blanc had become "un endroit banal", a trite and sordid place. "There is a false impression of facility: Mont Blanc has been very popular in recent years, with the mistaken impression of being in an urban environment with relief everywhere."

== Summer of 2018 ==
In 2018 the authorities of the department Haute-Savoie came to terms with the laments and indignation inexorably expressed by Peillex.

During the heat wave in June 2018, Peillex and the prefect issued together an official communiqué with a negative advice, discouraging the climb, and early August 2018, another communiqué alerting for the dangers of the stonefall in the couloir.

On 13 July, Pierre Lambert, the prefect of the department Haute-Savoie in Annecy, had already followed Peillex's proposals by issuing a decree that temporarily restricted the route to climbers with a reservation for the hut, which was extended repeatedly. The question was raised if such a restriction should become permanent

On 17 August Peillex issued another communiqué in which he vented his indignation about "attitudes ahurrisantes et intolérables" of impetuous climbers.

After another accident-ridden summer and several illustrations of the frivolity of some aspiring climbers, as well as incidental aggressive confrontations and antisocial behaviour, on 3 September Peillex could announce to impose in 2019 a permanent restriction in the form of a daily limit of 214 climbers for the route to the Goûter Refuge, according to a decision of the prefecture of the department who had finally yielded by instituting the proposed regulation.

Starting 2019, climbers on the Goûter Route without guides must pick up a "free" permit from the local tourism office to prove they have a bona fide place in a refuge on a given day. Peillex called it "a historic day"
