= Poor Souls (novel) =

1995 novel by Joseph Connolly

- First edition
- Author: Joseph Connolly
- Cover artist: Robert Clifford
- Language: English
- Publisher: Faber & Faber
- Publication date: 1995
- Publication place: United Kingdom
- Media type: Print
- Pages: 262
- ISBN: 978-0-57117-3952

Poor Souls is the debut novel by English author Joseph Connolly published in 1995 by Faber and Faber.

== Plot ==
The novel is set in 1985 and begins with Barry and Susan who arrive at dinner party hosted by Moira and Gavin; both couples believe that the other couple are happy. Barry is becoming an alcoholic, is a failed editor and has gambled all his money away, unbeknown to his wife Susan. Moira and Gavin are comfortably off but hate each other. Meanwhile Annie is in love with Barry and encourages him to sort out his life. Hilary regularly sleeps with George and Susan sleeps with several men and then with Hilary. Barry's life then comes off the rails, eventually leading to showdowns with Moira, Gavin and Sarah's boyfriend.

== Reception ==
- Steven Poole from The Independent is applauds the novel "The evening is over, but Joseph Connolly has only just started. These are two marriages ripe for disintegration, and he pulls them apart with impish glee...Barry drinks so much that occasionally you feel the bottle mountain is piled this high, the better for the plot to see where it should go next. Still, like James Kelman in How Late It Was, How Late, Connolly is good at showing, not merely describing, his hero's drunken state of mind. The syntax becomes obsessively coordinated, a breathless stream of "and.. .and...and..." punctuating ever-lengthening sentences, which pulse with mercurial changes of mood and subject...allowing this satire on human behaviour to become timeless, despite its modern trappings. This is borne out by the dark, tender pathos of the novel's ending, where we learn guiltily that all this droll vice has claimed a real, human victim."
- Rebecca Swift writing in the same newspaper has misgivings though "The idea behind Poor Souls is a good one: to produce a sharp, nasty, funny satire about mid-Eighties life in Thatcher's Britain. However, despite the simple, hypnotic prose which makes this an easily digestible read, Connolly's characters just aren't interesting enough: they are clichés, and self-consciously constructed as such. What's more, they talk in cliché: "He felt it as deep in his bones. He'd been a fool. He smiled: cliché. A blind fool. Yes, cliché. Did it matter? No, didn't matter". But, despite a great deal of ironic and clever double-bluffing on the author's part, it does matter."
