= To the Ends of the World =

2018 film by Guillaume Nicloux

To the Ends of the Earth
- Film poster
- Directed by: Guillaume Nicloux
- Screenplay by: Guillaume Nicloux; Jérôme Beaujour
- Produced by: Benoît Jaubert; Philippe Godeau
- Starring: Gaspard Ulliel; Guillaume Gouix; Lang Khê Tran; Gérard Depardieu
- Cinematography: David Ungaro
- Edited by: Guy Lecorne
- Music by: Shannon Wright
- Production company: Les Films du Worso
- Distributed by: Ad Vitam
- Release date: 10 May 2018 (Cannes)
- Running time: 103 minutes
- Country: France
- Language: French

To the Ends of the World (French: Les Confins du Monde) is a 2018 French film directed by Guillaume Nicloux. It was selected to screen in the Directors' Fortnight section at the 2018 Cannes Film Festival.

== Cast ==
- Gaspard Ulliel : Robert Tassen
- Guillaume Gouix : Cavagna
- Lang Khê Tran : Maï
- Gérard Depardieu : Saintonge
- Jonathan Couzinié : Lieutenant Maussier
- Kevin Janssens : Commandant Orlan
- Anthony Paliotti : Capitaine Sirbon
- Vi Minh Paul : Dao
- Vianney Duburque : Armand
