= Anna Chalon =

French singer-songwriter and guitarist

Anna Chalon (born 30 October 1989), also known under the stage name Kiddo, is a French singer-songwriter, guitarist, and performer. She wrote and performed the song Run and Hide for the film Je l'aimais (Somebody I Loved), based on the book by Anna Gavalda. She composes and performs the title Hush Hush played during the end credits of No et moi based on the novel of Delphine de Vigan. She is the daughter of Zabou Breitman and sister of Antonin Chalon.

== Biography ==
After obtaining her law degree from the Panthéon-Assas University, Anna Chalon studied music. She is a graduate of the London Music School and the Berklee College of Music in Boston.

In 2009, her song Run and Hide was nominated for the World Soundtrack Awards in the category of Best Original Song written specifically for film. The song was up against those by established artists such as Jamie Cullum, Kyle Eastwood, Bruce Springsteen and Allah Rakha Rahman.

The release of her first studio album was in 2012. This was done in collaboration with Jay Newland, who has worked on the first album of Norah Jones, Come Away with Me.

== Filmography ==
- 2001: Se souvenir des belles choses by Zabou Breitman
- 2006: L'Homme de sa vie by Zabou Breitman
- 2009: Je l'aimais by Zabou Breitman
- 2010: No et moi by Zabou Breitman
