= François Levantal =

French actor (born 1960)

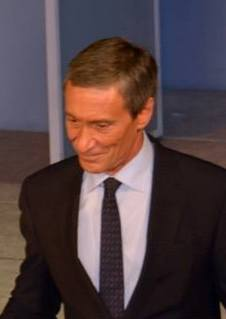
- Born: 14 October 1960 (age 65); Paris, France
- Occupation: Actor
- Years active: 1983-present
- Children: 1

François Levantal (born 14 October 1960) is a French actor. He has appeared in more than one hundred films since 1986.

== Filmography ==
Year	Title	Role	Director	Notes
1983	L'exile	Guerchard	Bernard Ristroph	TV movie
1986	Family Business		Costa-Gavras	
1989	La Révolution française	Romeuf	Robert Enrico	
1989	Les nuits révolutionnaires		Charles Brabant	TV mini-series
1992	L.627	Inspector	Bertrand Tavernier	
1992	Commissaire Moulin	Franck	Yves Rénier	TV series (1 episode)
1993	Flash - Der Fotoreporter	Dubois	Philippe Triboit	TV series (1 episode)
1994	Revenge of the Musketeers	Courtier	Bertrand Tavernier (2)	
1994	Cognacq-Jay	Henry	Laurent Heynemann	TV movie
1994	3000 scénarios contre un virus	The man	Laurent Heynemann (2)	TV series (1 episode)
1995	La Haine	Astérix	Mathieu Kassovitz	
1995	The Bait	Cop	Bertrand Tavernier (3)	
1995	L'instit	Chastaings	Laurent Heynemann (3)	TV series (1 episode)
1995	Chercheur d'héritiers	The archivist	Laurent Heynemann (4)	TV series (1 episode)
1996	A Self Made Hero	Delavelle	Jacques Audiard	
1996	Captain Conan	Forgeol	Bertrand Tavernier (4)	
1996	Homo automobilis		Vincent Mayrand	Short
1996	La poupée qui tue		Bruno Gantillon	TV movie
1997	Dobermann	Léo	Jan Kounen	
1997	On Guard	The knight	Philippe de Broca	
1997	Assassin(s)	Inspector	Mathieu Kassovitz (2)	
1997	Le ciel est à nous	Lou	Graham Guit	
1997	Shabbat Night Fever	Eric	Vincent Cassel	Short
1998	La voie est libre	Xavier	Stéphane Clavier	
1998	Zonzon	Rico	Laurent Bouhnik	
1998	Le poulpe	The aggressor	Guillaume Nicloux	
1998	L'annonce faite à Marius	The intern	Harmel Sbraire	
1998	Menhir - C'est citer		Hubert Koundé	Short
1998	L'histoire du samedi	Pierre	Françoise Decaux-Thomelet	TV series (1 episode)
1998	Deux flics	Captain Vanton	Laurent Heynemann (5)	TV series (1 episode)
1999	Quasimodo d'El Paris	The psychopath	Patrick Timsit	
1999	Une vie de prince	Corbiau	Daniel Cohen	
1999	Clara qui êtes aux cieux	Langel	Pascal Demolon & Jean-François Hirsch	Short
1999	Les duettistes : Une dette mortelle	Decker	Alain Tasma	TV movie
1999	La crim'	Saintonge's father	Miguel Courtois	TV series (1 episode)
2000	Sade	Latour	Benoît Jacquot	
2000	Murderous Maids	The Gazé	Jean-Pierre Denis	
2000	The Crimson Rivers	Pathologist	Mathieu Kassovitz (3)	
2000	Le sens des affaires	Etienne Bac	Guy-Philippe Bertin	
2000	Même pas mal		Diastème	Short
2000	Passage interdit	Gérard Le Sech'	Michaël Perrotta	TV movie
2000	Une femme d'honneur	Denis Frankin	Alain Bonnot	TV series (1 episode)
2001	Belphegor, Phantom of the Louvre	Mangin	Jean-Paul Salomé	
2001	Beautiful Memories	Daniel	Zabou Breitman	
2001	Gregoire Moulin vs. Humanity	The vindictive	Artus de Penguern	
2001	Confession d'un dragueur	Kovacs	Alain Soral	
2001	Vertiges de l'amour	The seller	Laurent Chouchan	
2001	Le nouveau big bang	CEO	Nicolas Koretzky	Short
2001	Le barbier	S.S. Officer	Jon Carnoy	Short
2001	La nuit du chien		Robin Sykes	Short
2001	Rastignac ou les ambitieux	Monsieur Langeais	Alain Tasma (2)	TV mini-series
2001	P.J.	Thierry Carvenne	Christian Bonnet	TV series (1 episode)
2002	The Red Siren	Sorvan	Olivier Megaton	
2002	Gangsters	Eddy Dahan	Olivier Marchal	
2002	Le nouveau Jean-Claude	Marco	Didier Tronchet	
2002	La guerre à Paris		Yolande Zauberman	
2002	Corto Maltese - Sous le signe du capricorne		Richard Danto & Liam Saury	
2002	À l'abri des regards indiscrets	Golden-boy	Ruben Alves & Hugo Gélin	Short
2002	L'ancien		Nicky Naudé & Emmanuel Rodriguez	Short
2002	Le juge est une femme	Paul Savary	Charlotte Brandström	TV series (1 episode)
2002-04	Avocats & associés	Nicolas Foucault	Alexandre Pidoux, Philippe Triboit (2), ...	TV series (26 episodes)
2003	Michel Vaillant	Bob Cramer	Louis-Pascal Couvelaire	
2003	Mauvais esprit	Freddy	Patrick Alessandrin	
2003	Le veilleur		Frédéric Brival	
2003	À cran	Pelletier	Alain Tasma (3)	TV movie
2003	Les enquêtes d'Éloïse Rome	Peter Mateos	Christophe Douchand	TV series (1 episode)
2004	A Very Long Engagement	Gaston Thouvenel	Jean-Pierre Jeunet	
2004	Blueberry	Pete	Jan Kounen (2)	
2004	Narco	The twins's father	Tristan Aurouet & Gilles Lellouche	
2004	Nos amis les flics	Gégé	Bob Swaim	
2004	Transit		Julien Leclercq	Short
2004	La chepor	BCBG	David Tessier	Short
2004	À cran, deux ans après	Pelletier	Alain Tasma (4)	TV movie
2005	Love Is in the Air	The Sydney passenger	Rémi Bezançon	
2005	Burnt Out	Jean	Fabienne Godet	
2005	L'amour aux trousses	Carlos	Philippe de Chauveron	
2005	Nèg maron	Marcus	Jean-Claude Flamand-Barny	
2005	L'antidote	Pierre Verneuil	Vincent De Brus	
2005	La battante	Denis Pasco	Didier Albert	TV mini-series
2006	Camping	Boyer	Fabien Onteniente	
2006	Sheitan	The pumpman / surgeon	Kim Chapiron	
2006	L'Entente Cordiale	Jean-Éric Berthaud	Vincent De Brus (2)	
2006	Demain la veille	The jailer	Julien Lecat & Sylvain Pioutaz	Short
2006	L'affaire Pierre Chanal	Pierre Chanal	Patrick Poubel	TV movie
2006	David Nolande	Verbeck	Nicolas Cuche	TV series (1 episode)
2007	L'île aux trésors	Ben Gunn	Alain Berbérian	
2007	La lance de la destinée	Herard	Dennis Berry	TV mini-series
2007	Élodie Bradford	François Forcalquier	Olivier Guignard	TV series (1 episode)
2007	Les Bleus	Boris Lukacs	Patrick Poubel (2)	TV series (2 episodes)
2007-10	Sur le fil	Commandant Philippe Munoz	Frédéric Berthe & Bruno Garcia	TV series (18 episodes)
2008	Dante 01	Lazare	Marc Caro	
2008	Orange Juice	Charles	Ronan Moucheboeuf	Short
2008	La mort n'oublie personne	Schots	Laurent Heynemann (6)	TV movie
2009	Black	Degrand	Pierre Laffargue	
2009	Lascars	Judge Santiepi	Emmanuel Klotz & Albert Pereira-Lazaro	
2009	Vendetta	JB	Patrick Bossard	Short
2009	Cartouche, le brigand magnifique	D'Argenson	Henri Helman	TV movie
2009	Kaamelott	Publius Servius Capito	Alexandre Astier	TV series (6 episodes)
2010	Proie	Nicolas	Antoine Blossier	
2010	Vivre, jusqu'au bout...	Stephen	Vincent Plaidy	Short
2010	Les bons tuyaux	Louis Skelington	Olivier Riffard	Short
2011	A Gang Story	Joan Chavez	Olivier Marchal (2)	
2011	L'Élève Ducobu	Pension Professor	Philippe de Chauveron (2)	
2011	Enfant de la partie	Coach	Kim Chapiron (2)	Short
2011	Ni vu, ni connu	Oscar Merini	Christophe Douchand (2)	TV movie
2011	Braquo	Aymeric Gauthier Dantin	Philippe Haïm & Eric Valette	TV series (8 episodes)
2012	Porn in the Hood	The sex-shop seller	Franck Gastambide	
2012	Peter	Captain Hook	Nicolas Duval	Short
2012	Pari	Photographer	Jovanka Sopalovic	Short
2012	Foot Lose	Gérard Girardetti	Charles Meurisse	TV series (1 episode)
2013	Les invincibles	The dentist	Frédéric Berthe (2)	
2013	Quarante	Xavier		Short
2013	Les petits joueurs		Guillaume Breton	Short
2013	Julie Lescaut	Alexandre Staniak	René Manzor	TV series (1 episode)
2013-16	Les Kassos	Various	Alexis Beaumont, Julien Daubas, ...	TV series (21 episodes)
2014	Les Francis	Captain Boullont	Fabrice Begotti	
2014	Murders at Rouen	François	Christian Bonnet (2)	TV movie
2014	La petite histoire de France	Philippe Honoré de Roche Saint-Pierre	Jonathan Barré	TV series (1 episode)
2016	Raid dingue	Patrick Legrand	Dany Boon	
2022	Bigbug	Yonyx Leader	Jean-Pierre Jeunet	Netflix

== Theater ==
Year	Title	Author	Director	Notes
1985	The Birds	Aristophanes	Jean-Louis Barrault	Théâtre Renaud-Barrault
2010	La Médaille	Lydie Salvayre	Zabou Breitman	Théâtre du Rond-Point
2014-15	Le Placard	Francis Veber	Francis Veber	Théâtre des Nouveautés

== Music videos ==
Year	Song	Artist	Director
2002	Danser	TTC	Kim Chapiron
2011	Disque De Lumière	Rockin' Squat	Mohamed Mazouz & Mathias Cassel
