= Julie-Marie Parmentier =

French actress (born 1981)

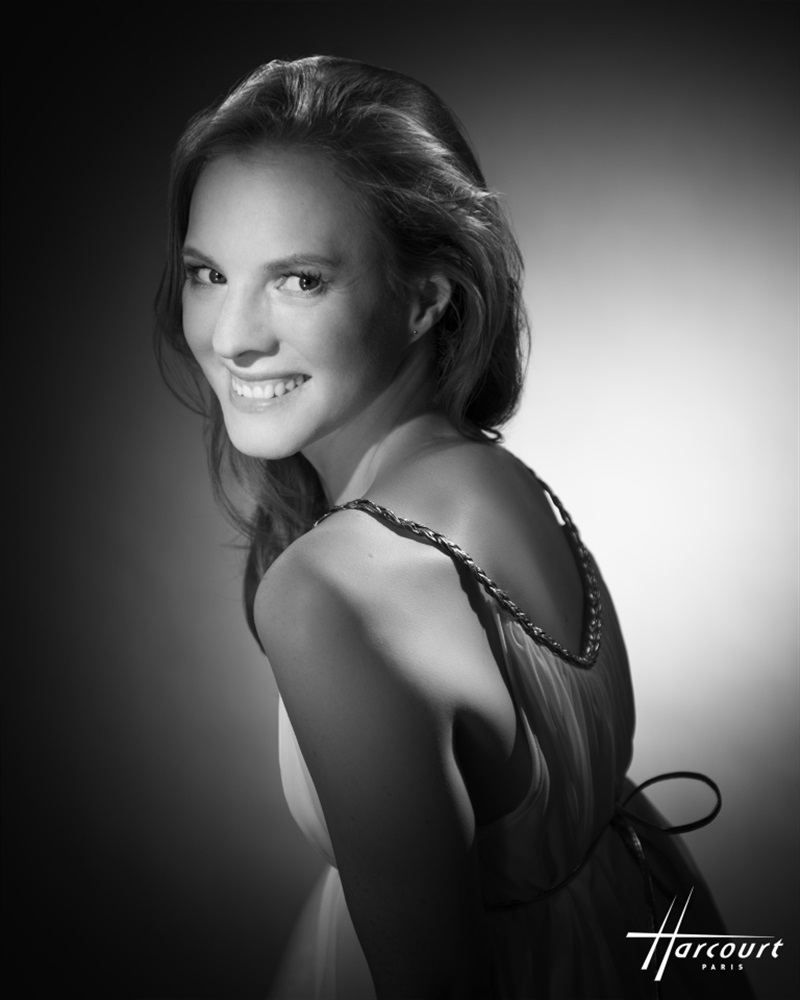
- Julie-Marie Parmentier by Harcourt
- Born: 13 June 1981 (age 44); Saint-Quentin, Aisne, France
- Occupation(s): Actress and writer
- Years active: 1997–present

Julie-Marie Parmentier (born 13 June 1981) is a French actress.

She began practising theater at nine years old, in Saint-Quentin, Aisne.

At the age of fifteen, she played in her first feature film, Petites, by Noémie Lvovsky. Since then, she has worked with many important directors.

She garnered critical acclaim for her roles in films such as Les Blessures Assassines by Jean-Pierre Denis, Charly by Isild Le Besco and No et moi by Zabou Breitman. She has been nominated for the César Award for Most Promising Actress for her role in Les Blessures Assassines and for which she won a Best Actress Award at the Mar del Plata Film Festival. She has also appeared in such films as Sheitan by Kim Shapiron, Around a Small Mountain by Jacques Rivette and Les Adieux à la reine by Benoît Jacquot.

She is also a famous actress on stage. She has collaborated for more than ten years with André Engel, for who she played, among others, Cordelia in King Lear along Michel Piccoli, and Catherine in La petite Catherine de Heilbronn.

Julie-Marie worked at the Comédie-Française, where she was praised for Agnès in L'école des Femmes and Camille in On ne badine pas avec l'amour.

She won the Jean-Jacques Gauthier prize for Best Drama Actress for her monologue La séparation des songes by Jean Delabroy directed by Michel Didym.

== Selected filmography ==
Film
Year	Title	Role	Director	Notes
2017	Demain et tous les autres jours		Noémie Lvovsky	
2016	Les Visiteurs, la Révolution	Norah	Jean-Marie Poiré	
2015	Evolution	The mother	Lucile Hadzihalilovic	
2012	Farewell, My Queen		Benoît Jacquot	
2011	The Snows of Kilimanjaro		Robert Guediguian	
2010	No et moi	No	Zabou Breitman	
2009	Around a Small Mountain		Jacques Rivette	
2007	Charly	Charly	Isild Le Besco	Prix du meilleur film européen au festival Crossing Europe de Linz
2006	Sheitan		Kim Shapiron	
2004	Folle embellie		Dominique Cabrera	
	Le ventre de Juliette	Juliette	Martin Provost	
2002	Marie-Jo and Her Two Lovers		Robert Guediguian	
2000	Murderous Maids		Jean-Pierre Denis	Award de la Meilleure actrice au Festival international du film de Mar del Plata Award de la Meilleure actrice au Festival international du film d'amour de Mons
2000	The Town Is Quiet		Robert Guediguian	
1998	La vie ne me fait pas peur	Stella	Noémie Lvovsky	Léopard d'Argent au Festival international du film de Locarno

== Literature ==
Julie-Marie Parmentier has always been impassioned with English language. She learnt it to be able to read, speak and write in English.

She has also been learning Chinese.

In 2014, she wrote a children book Les aventures de Pip-Pip le moineau published at the Éditions L'Harmattan. Since then, she has written many novels.

== YouTube Channel ==
In 2019, Julie-Marie launched her theater channel on YouTube : Julie-Marie's Little Theater which she sees as an artistic experiment and performance. She does everything by herself, she writes some of the texts and plays poems in English.

She has a French channel, Le petit Théâtre de Julie-Marie, where she tells story for children and the history of theater. She plays monologues and various scenes.

== Awards and nominations ==
=== Awards ===
- 2001: Best Actress at the Mar del Plata Film Festival for Les Blessures Assassines
- 2010: Jean-Jacques Gauthier prize for Best Drama Actress

=== Nominations ===
- 2001: César Award for Most Promising Actress for Les Blessures Assassines
- 2008: Moliere Award: nominated for Best Promising Actress for La Petite Catherine de Heilbronn
