= Angie David =

French writer, actress and publisher

Angie David (born 1978) is a French writer, actress and publisher.

== Biography ==
Angie David joined the Éditions Léo Scheer in 2002. The editorial secretary of La Revue littéraire in 2006, she also was a critic in the team of the Tout arrive radio program on France Culture until 2012. Since 2013, she has been the executive director of the Éditions Léo Scheer.

In 2006, she was awarded the Prix Goncourt de la Biographie for her book Dominique Aury.

== Publications ==
- 2006: Dominique Aury, La Vie secrète de l'auteur d'Histoire d'Ô, Éditions Léo Scheer, ISBN 2756100307
- 2007: Frédéric Beigbeder, Éditions Léo Scheer, ISBN 2756100927
- 2008: Marilou sous la neige, Éditions Léo Scheer, ISBN 2756101451
- 2010: Kim, Éditions Léo Scheer, ISBN 9782756102351
- 2013: Sylvia Bataille, Éditions Léo Scheer, ISBN 9782756104133

== Filmography ==
Actress

- 2004: Happily Ever After by Yvan Attal
- 2006: The Man of My Life by Zabou Breitman
- 2006: Les Gens dans mon lit by Victoria Cohen (short film)
