= Pierre Vassiliu =

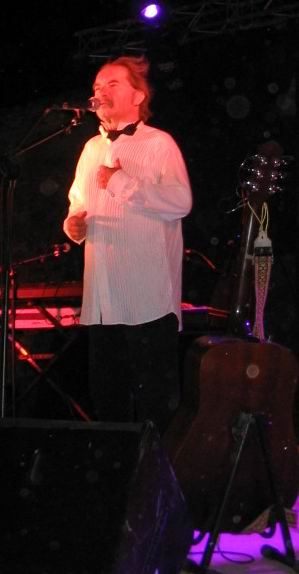
- Pierre Vassiliu performing at a concert in Cambieure in 2004.

Background information
- Born: 23 October 1937; Villecresnes, Seine-et-Oise, France
- Died: 17 August 2014 (aged 76) Sète, Hérault, France
- Occupations: Musician, songwriter, actor
- Label: Decca Barclay RCA

Pierre Vassiliu (23 October 1937 – 17 August 2014) was a French singer, songwriter and actor.

== Career ==
His first record, "Armand", co-written with his brother Michel, appeared in 1962. It was an enormous success, selling 150,000 copies. This opened the doors of the Olympia in Paris to him, where he opened for the Beatles in 1964. He went on to a two-month stand with Françoise Hardy, Jacques Dutronc, and Johnny Hallyday. He had a string of hits, including "Charlotte", "Ivanhoe", and "La femme du sergent", censored because of the Algerian War.

His 1973 song "Qui c'est celui-là?" was a cover of the 1972 song Partido Alto by Chico Buarque. It sold more than 300,000 copies and secured for him a place in the memories of the teenagers of the time. That same year he was also the voice of minstrel Alan-a-Dale in the French version of the Disney animated movie Robin Hood.

With his vocal trio, he resurrected the old French song "Belle qui tiens ma vie", sung a cappella.

In 2002, he covered Boby Lapointe's "L'Été, où est-il ?" with Thallia on the album Boby Tutti-Frutti – L'hommage délicieux à Boby Lapointe by Lilicub.

In 2003, he made a CD with Senegalese griots of the Kalone Orchestra of Casamance. Vassiliu lived a part of his life in the Casamance, the region of Senegal lying to the south of the Gambia.

He died in his sleep in 2014, after years of battling Parkinson's.
