= Isabelle Carré =

French actress (born 1971)

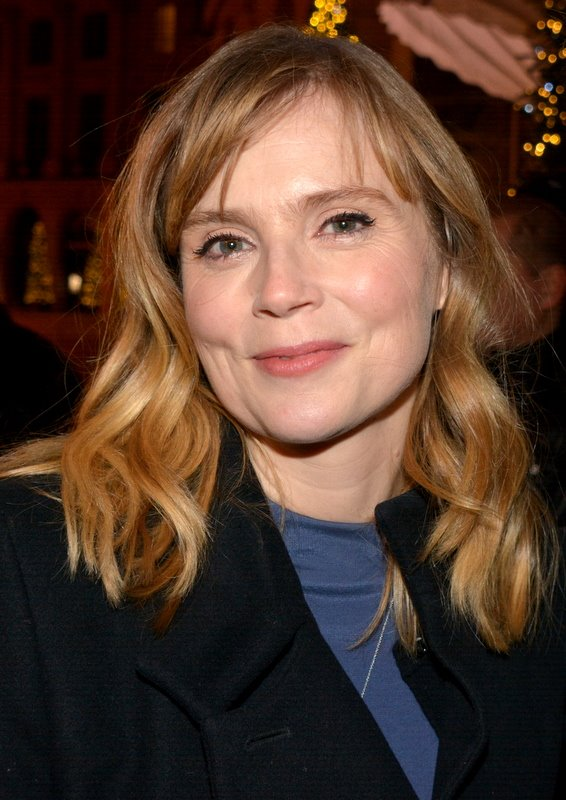
- Isabelle Carré in 2016
- Born: 28 May 1971 (age 55); Paris, France
- Other name: Izzy
- Occupations: Actress, novelist
- Years active: 1989–present
- Spouse: Bruno Pésery (2006–present)
- Partner: Clément Sibony (1999–2005)

Isabelle Carré (French: [izabɛl kaʁe]; born 28 May 1971) is a French actress. She has appeared in more than 70 films since 1989. She won a César Award for Best Actress for her role in Se souvenir des belles choses (2001), and has been nominated a further six times for Beau fixe (1992), Le Hussard sur le toit (1995), La Femme défendue (1997), Les Sentiments (2003), Entre ses mains (2005) and Anna M. (2007).

Since 26 August 2006, she has been married to film producer Bruno Pésery, with whom she has a son, Antoine, born on 11 October 2008. Her brother, Benoît Carré, is a member of the band Lilicub.

== Selected filmography ==
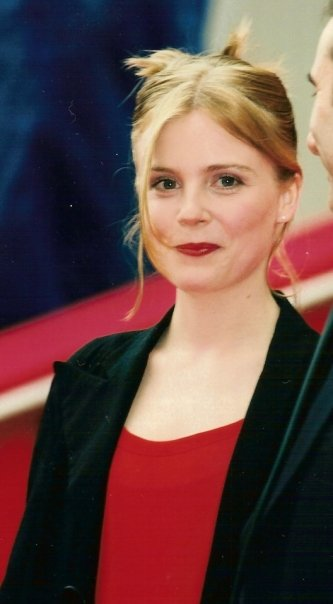
Isabelle Carré at the 1997 Cannes Film Festival

Year	Title	Role	Director
1992	Beau fixe	Valerie	Christian Vincent
1994	The Horseman on the Roof	the tutor	Jean-Paul Rappeneau
1995	Beaumarchais	Rosine	Édouard Molinaro
1996	Les Soeurs Soleil	Murielle	Jeannot Szwarc
1996	The Banned Woman	Muriel	Philippe Harel
1998	Children of the Century	Aimée d'Alton	Diane Kurys
1999	The Children of the Marshland	Marie	Jean Becker
1999	Season's Beatings	Annabelle	Danièle Thompson
2000	Taking Wing (L'Envol)	Julie	Steve Suissa
2001	He Loves Me... He Loves Me Not (À la folie... pas du tout)	Rachel	Laetitia Colombani
2002	Beautiful Memories	Claire Poussin	Zabou Breitman
2003	Holy Lola	Géraldine	Bertrand Tavernier
2003	Les Sentiments	Edith	Noémie Lvovsky
2004	Entre ses mains	Claire Gauthier	Anne Fontaine
2006	Private Fears in Public Places	Gaëlle	Alain Resnais
2006	Anna M.	Anna M.	Michel Spinosa
2006	Four Stars	Franssou	Christian Vincent
2007	The Fox and the Child	narrator	Luc Jacquet
2008	Cliente	Fanny	Josiane Balasko
2008	Musée haut, musée bas	Carole Province	Jean-Michel Ribes
2009	Tellement proches	Nathalie	Éric Toledano and Olivier Nakache
2010	The Refuge	Mousse	François Ozon
2010	Romantics Anonymous	Angélique	Jean-Pierre Améris
2011	Headwinds	Josée Combe	Jalil Lespert
2012	Cherry on the Cake	Florence	Laura Morante
2012	Looking for Hortense	Aurore	Pascal Bonitzer
2014	Respire	Vanessa	Mélanie Laurent
2014	Marie's Story	Sister Marguerite	Jean-Pierre Améris
2015	21 Nights with Pattie	Caroline	Arnaud and Jean-Marie Larrieu
2015	Love at First Child	Gabrielle	Anne Giafferi
2015	Paris-Willouby	Claire Lacourt	Arthur Delaire; Quentin Reynaud
2017	Garde alternée	Virginie	Alexandra Leclère
2020	De Gaulle	Yvonne de Gaulle	Gabriel Le Bomin
2021	Delicious	Louise	Éric Besnard
2022	Continental Drift (South)	Nathalie Adler	Lionel Baier
2024	Prodigieuses		

== Theatre ==
- 1990: Une nuit de Casanova
- 1990: The Cherry Orchard
- 1992: L'École des Femmes
- 1993: On ne badine pas avec l'amour
- 1993: Il ne faut jurer de rien
- 1993: Le Mal court
- 1995: Dostoïevsky va à la plage
- 1995: Le Père humilié
- 1995: Arloc
- 1996: Slaves
- 1999: Mademoiselle Else
- 2000: Résonances
- 2001: The Tragedy of Othello, the Moor of Venice
- 2001: Léonce et Léna
- 2002: Hugo à deux voix
- 2003: La Nuit chante
- 2004: L'Hiver sous la table
- 2006: Blanc
- 2009: Un garçon impossible (by Petter S. Rosenlund, directed by Jean-Michel Ribes)

== Awards ==
- Prix Romy Schneider, 1998
- Lumière Award for Best Actress, Se souvenir des belles choses, 2003
- César Award for Best Actress, Se souvenir des belles choses, 2003

=== Nominations ===
- 1993: Nominated for the César Award for Most Promising Actress for Beau fixe
- 1996: Nominated for the César Award for Most Promising Actress for Le Hussard sur le toit
- 1998: Nominated for the César Award for Most Promising Actress for La Femme défendue
- 2004: Nominated for the César Award for Best Actress for Les Sentiments
- 2006: Nominated for the César Award for Best Actress for Entre ses mains (In His Hands)
- 2006: Nominated for the Globes de Cristal Award for Best Actress for Entre ses mains (In His Hands)
- 2008: Nominated for the César Award for Best Actress for Anna M.
- 2008: Nominated for the Globes de Cristal Award for Best Actress for Anna M.
- 2011: Nominated for the César Award for Best Actress for Les Émotifs anonymes

=== Theatre ===
- 1999: Molière Award for Best Actress, Mademoiselle Else
- 2004: Molière Award for Best Actress, L'Hiver sous la table

== Decorations ==
- Officer of the Order of Arts and Letters (2016)
