= Around a Small Mountain =

2009 film

- Theatrical release poster
- Directed by: Jacques Rivette
- Written by: Shirel Amitay; Pascal Bonitzer; Sergio Castellitto; Christine Laurent; Jacques Rivette
- Produced by: Martine Marignac; Maurice Tinchant
- Starring: Jane Birkin; Sergio Castellitto
- Cinematography: Irina Lubtchansky
- Edited by: Nicole Lubtchansky
- Music by: Pierre Allio
- Production company: Pierre Grise Productions
- Distributed by: Les Films du Losange (France); Bolero Film (Italy)
- Release dates: 8 September 2009 (Italy); 9 September 2009 (France)
- Running time: 84 minutes
- Countries: France; Italy
- Language: French

Around a Small Mountain (French: 36 vues du pic Saint-Loup) is a 2009 French drama film directed by Jacques Rivette, which was his final film before his death on 29 January 2016, and starred Jane Birkin and Sergio Castellitto. It was screened in the main competition at the 66th Venice International Film Festival.

== Plot ==
Kate (Jane Birkin) is driving along a winding mountain road when her car stalls. Vittorio (Sergio Castellitto) happens along, stops, and fixes her car without ever speaking to her. After he drives away, he slows down and decides to turn back. Something about the woman has interested him.

Later in town, Vittorio learns that Kate has returned to join her family's traveling circus after leaving under mysterious conditions fifteen years ago. Kate's lover was killed during a performance. Intrigued by Kate's story, Vittorio stays for the show, and then decides to stay in town for a while, booking the room above a local cafe. He begins to attend all the shows, fascinated by the circus and the lives of its performers—all the while trying to discover the secret that led to Kate's sudden departure.

When the circus caravan leaves town, Vittorio follows. With nowhere to go and nothing else to do, both he and Kate seem to be running away with the circus. Gradually he learns about the buried past of the circus and the buried careers of its performers.

== Cast ==
- Jane Birkin as Kate
- Sergio Castellitto as Vittorio
- André Marcon as Alexandre
- Jacques Bonnaffé as Marlo
- Julie-Marie Parmentier as Clémence
- Hélène de Vallombreuse as Margot
- Tintin Orsoni as Wilfrid
- Vimala Pons as Barbara
- Mikaël Gaspar as Tom
- Stéphane Laisné as Stéphane
- Dominique D'Angelo as Dom
- Hélène De Bissy as La patronne de l'auberge
- Pierre Barayre as Le patron de l'auberge
- Marie-Paule André as Estelle
- Julie-Anne Roth as Xénie
- Elodie Mamou as Elodie

== Reception ==
=== Critical reception ===
On review aggregator website Rotten Tomatoes, the film holds an approval rating of 74% based on 19 reviews, and an average rating of 6.3/10. On Metacritic, the film has a weighted average score of 63 out of 100, based on 6 critics, indicating "generally favorable reviews".

In his review for the Chicago Sun-Times, Roger Ebert gave the film three out of four stars, writing:

Sometimes a film is simply a story we might have found interesting to live. Its message may be no more than that we all have to weather hard times. To ordinary life may be added some style and artifice, allowing the filmmaker to tweak reality into a more pleasing form. Maybe that's what Jacques Rivette has in mind with Around a Small Mountain.

=== Awards and nominations ===
- 2010 Italian National Syndicate of Film Journalists Silver Ribbon Nomination for Best Actor (Sergio Castellitto)
- 2009 Venice Film Festival Golden Lion Nomination (Jacques Rivette)
