= Flash - Der Fotoreporter =

Flash - Der Fotoreporter is a 1993 German television series, about a press photographer named Flash. Six 90 minute episodes were produced by Taurus Film. It stars Oliver Tobias, Catherine Alric, Frédéric Darié and Saïd Amadis. Claudia Cardinale and François Levantal appeared as guests in the TV Series.
