= Adrien's Story =

- Directed by: Jean-Pierre Denis
- Written by: Jean-Pierre Denis; Françoise Dudognon
- Produced by: Jean-Pierre Denis
- Starring: Bernard Sautereau; Serge Dominique
- Cinematography: Denis Gheerbrant
- Edited by: Catherine Mabilat
- Music by: Joan P. Verdier
- Distributed by: Gaumont Distribution
- Release dates: 12 May 1980 (Cannes); 14 January 1981 (France)
- Running time: 95 minutes
- Country: France
- Language: Occitan

Adrien's Story (French: Histoire d'Adrien) is a 1980 Occitan language French drama film written, directed and produced by Jean-Pierre Denis. It was screened in the International Critics' Week section at the 1980 Cannes Film Festival where it won the Caméra d'Or.

== Cast ==
- Bernard Sautereau as The young Adrien
- Serge Dominique as The adult Adrien
- Marcelle Dessalles as The mother
- Pierre Dienade as The father
- Jean-Paul Geneste as Roger
- Marie-Claude Kergoat as The Shepherdess
- Christian Murat as The brother
- Odette Peytoureau as The grandmother
- Nadine Reynaud as Marguerite
