= L'Opération Corned-Beef =

- Theatrical release poster
- Directed by: Jean-Marie Poiré
- Screenplay by: Jean-Marie Poiré; Christian Clavier
- Produced by: Alain Terzian
- Starring: Christian Clavier; Jean Reno; Isabelle Renauld; Mireille Rufel; Valérie Lemercier; Jacques François
- Music by: Eric Levi
- Production company: Gaumont
- Distributed by: Gaumont Distribution
- Release date: 6 February 1991
- Running time: 105 minutes
- Country: France
- Box office: Ffr 23 million (France)

L'Opération Corned Beef is a French film directed by Jean-Marie Poiré. It was filmed during the summer of 1990 and released on 6 February 1991.

It was the fifth collaboration between screenwriters Jean-Marie Poiré and Christian Clavier. The film also brought actors Christian Clavier and Jean Reno together, before their appearance in Les Visiteurs.

== Synopsis ==
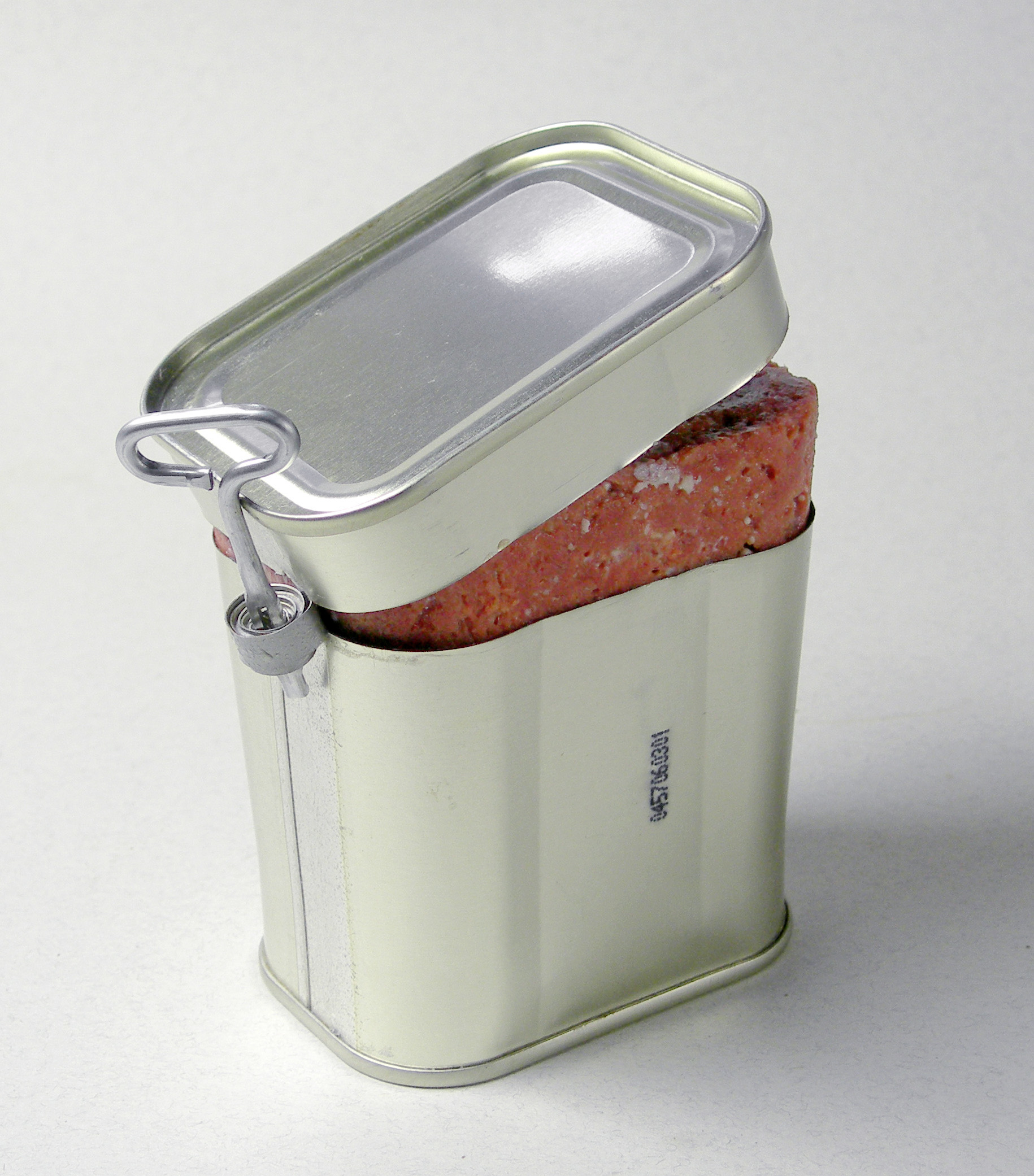
A can of corned beef

The film begins in Bogotá, Colombia. Captain Philippe Boulier, called 'Le Squale' (The Shark) (Jean Reno), is monitoring the actions of Augusto Zargas (André Schmit), a former Argentinian colonel and current arms dealer.

To track his movements, the French secret service (DGSE) hides a microphone in the engagement ring of Marie-Laurence Granianski (Valérie Lemercier), an interpreter for the consul general, one of Zargas' associates (Marc de Jonge).

Ms. Granianski wants to take a few days off to celebrate her wedding anniversary with her husband, Jean-Jacques (Christian Clavier). 'Le Squale' tries to sabotage the couple's relationship by tempting the husband with a beautiful woman, so that Ms. Granianski will cancel her wedding anniversary and remain at the consulate.

'Le Squale' does not know that the agent they send is actually his own fiancé, Isabelle (Isabelle Renauld), but in the end, Jean-Jacques Granianski, an average Frenchman and corporate psychologist, resists the secret agent.

== Technical details ==
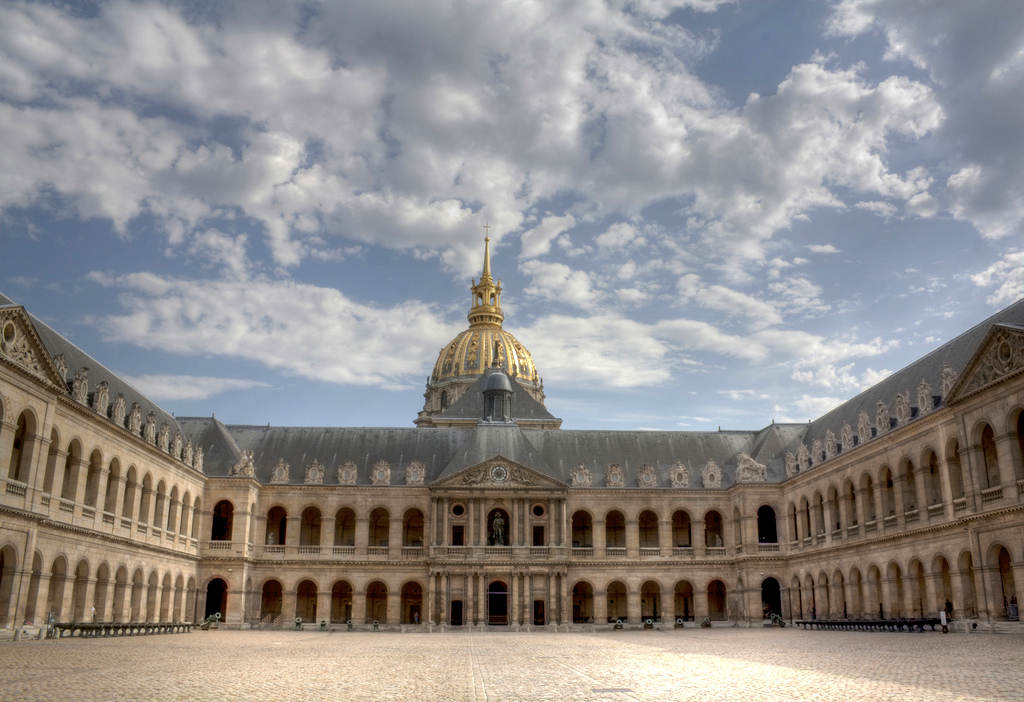
The final scene takes place in the courtyard of Les Invalides.

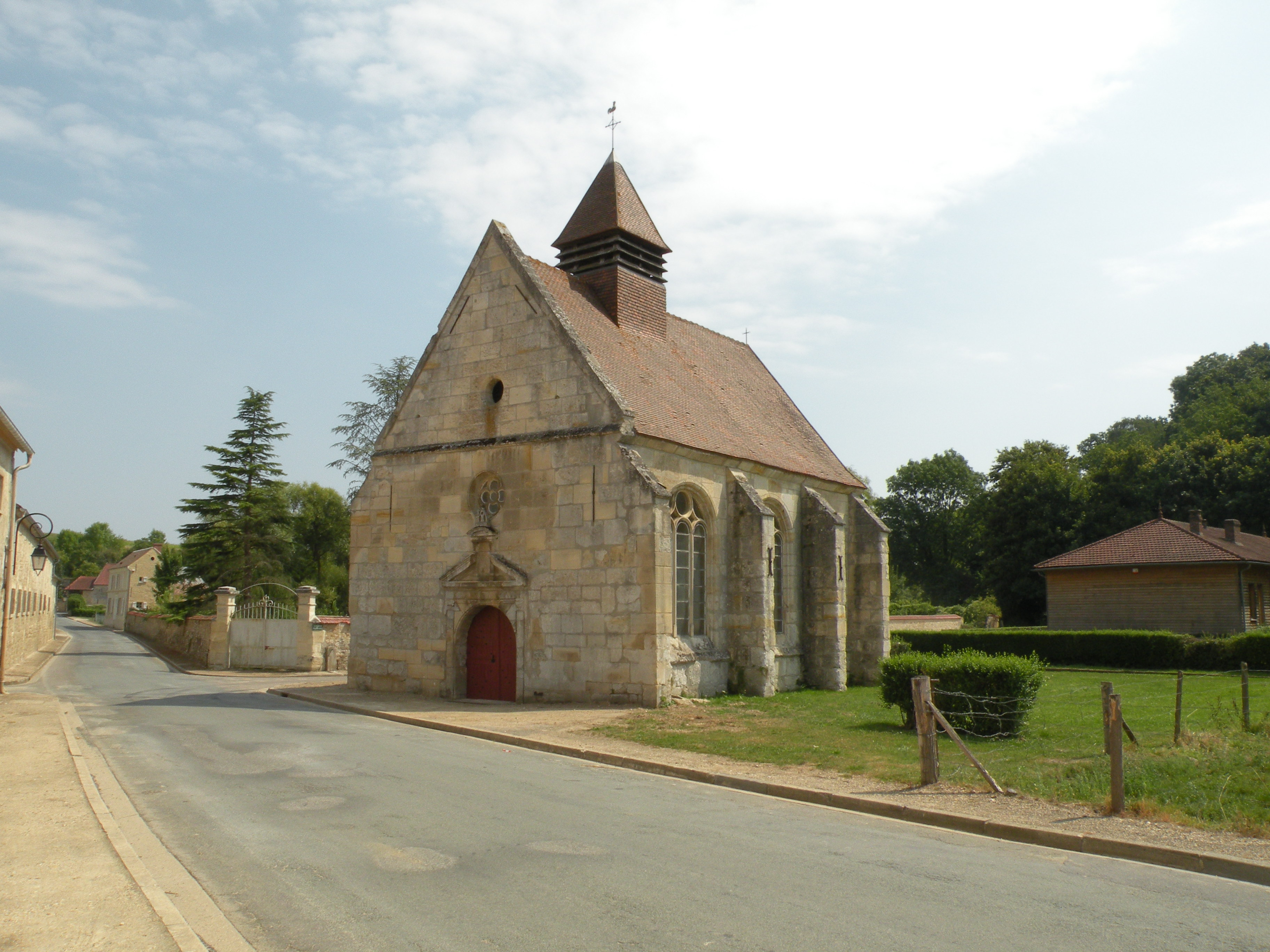
The scene where the elderly lady returns through the hospice gateway was filmed in Theuville, Val-d'Oise.

- Title: L'Opération Corned Beef
- Director: Jean-Marie Poiré
- Assistant director: Alain-Michel Blanc, Paul Gueu and Simon Lelouch
- Screenplay and script: Christian Clavier, Jean-Marie Poiré
- Sets: Hugues Tissandier
- Costumes: Sophie Marcou
- Director of photography: Jean-Yves Le Mener
- Sound: Pierre Charles Lenoir
- Music: Eric Lévi
- Editing: Catherine Kelber
- Casting director: Françoise Menidrey
- Producer: Alain Terzian
- Production companies: Gaumont, Alpilles productions, Amigo productions, Alter Films, (Note: Alter Films is the production company of Alain Terzian ("Al" for Alain and "Ter" for Terzian).) TF1 Films Production
- Country: France
- Language: French (with some dialogue in Spanish and German)
- Format: colour – 35mm – CinemaScope
- Length: 105 minutes
- Genre: Comedy, action, adventure
- Release dates:
  - France: 6 February 1991
  - Germany: 13 June 1991
  - Hungary: 21 February 1992 (titled Marhakonzerv akció)
  - Spain: 11 March 1994 (titled Operación Chuleta de Ternera)
  - Japan: 5 March 1997 (direct-to-video)

== Cast ==
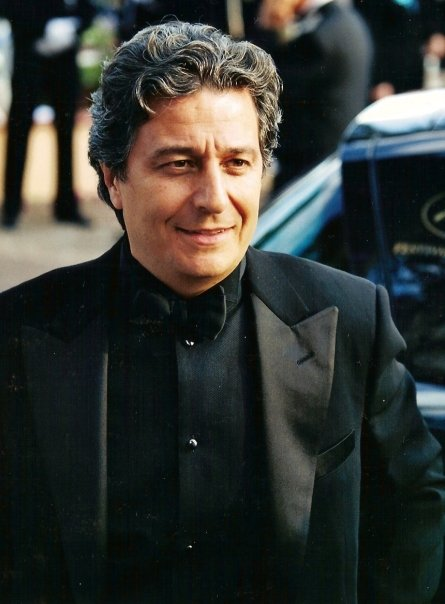
Christian Clavier plays Jean-Jacques Granianski, a corporate psychologist who finds himself mixed up in Opération Corned-Beef.

- Christian Clavier: Jean-Jacques Granianski
- Jean Reno: Captain Philippe Boulier called "le Squale" ('the shark'), agent of the DGSE.
- Valérie Lemercier: Marie-Laurence Granianski
- Isabelle Renauld: Lieutenant Isabelle Fourreau
- Mireille Rufel: Aspirant Monique Garcia
- Jacques François: General Masse, of the DGSE.
- Francis Coffinet: Georges Favart, coworker of Boulier at the DGSE.
- Marc de Jonge: Horst Burger, the Austrian consul.
- Jacques Dacqmine: General Moulin, of the DST.
- Raymond Gérôme: Ghislain Chauffereau, the father-in-law of Jean-Jacques Granianski.
- Dimitri Rougeul: Geoffroy, one of Granianski's two sons.
- Jacques Sereys: Defence Minister
- André Schmit: Argentinian colonel Augusto Zargas
- Philippe Laudenbach: Minister of Home Affairs
- Jean-Marie Cornille: Adjoint-general secretary Froment, who walks François Mitterrand's dog.
- Yves Barsacq: The president's butler
- Dan Simkovitch: 2nd class Delphine Granger
- Jean-Pierre Clami: Traveller that Boulier prevents from leaving the toilets at the airport.
- Luc Barney: Singer who performs the song Robin des Bois (Robin Hood) at the Élysée Palace
- Didier Gustin: President François Mitterrand (voice)
- Unknown: François Mitterrand, from the back.
- Unknown: Helmut Kohl, from the back.
- Jean-Marie Poiré: A client at the cafeteria of the gas station (cameo).

== Production ==
=== Genesis and development ===
Christian Clavier and Jean-Marie Poiré pitched the film to producer Alain Terzian over dinner one evening. He was enthusiastic, but unsure about the title. He suggested renaming the film Le Squale (after the main character), but the authors preferred to retain the original title.

Jean-Marie Poiré had great difficulty getting the project started because of his recent failure with Mes meilleurs copains.

=== Casting ===
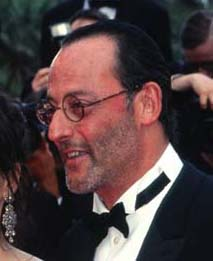
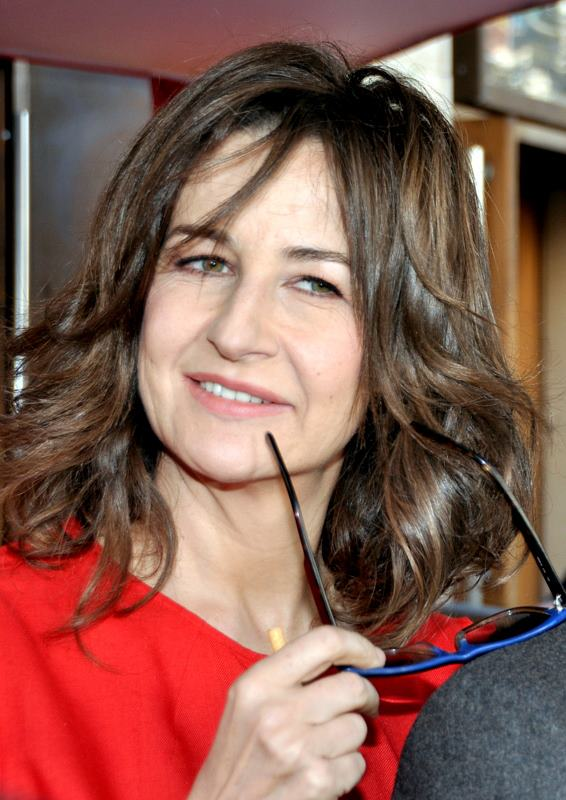
While Jean Reno was taking his first lead role in a comedy, Valérie Lemercier gained her first major supporting role in a film, after some minor appearances in other films.

Gérard Depardieu was initially asked to play "Le Squale", but he refused. He nevertheless shot Les Anges gardiens with Jean-Marie Poiré and Christian Clavier four years later. Other actors were considered, such as Daniel Auteuil (who was shooting the film Lacenaire), Thierry Lhermitte, Gérard Lanvin, Pierre Arditi, and Bernard Giraudeau. It was Marie-Anne Chazel, companion of Christian Clavier, who suggested Jean Reno for the role of "Le Squale".

Producer Alain Terzian, in an interview with Première, narrated the hiring of Jean Reno:

[... So I asked Luc who was his agent, and Luc said, 'This is my father! Reno is in Yucatán, but my dad can bring him the script. He was shooting L'Homme au masque d'or with Marlee Matlin. Three days later, the phone rang in my office, avenue de Messine:

Hello, it's Jean. It's amazing. When do we shoot? When do we sign?

And while we were talking, a fax was coming in:

Name: Jean Reno. Movie: Operation Corned Beef. Salary: You will put what you want.

It was launched.

— Alain Terzian, Première no. 456

Jean-Marie Poiré had great faith in this duo, which mixed the generations of Le Splendid with Christian Clavier and The Big Blue with Jean Reno.

Catherine Jacob had to turn down the part of Marie-Laurence Granianski because she was already cast in Merci la vie, directed by Bertrand Blier. Ironically, she received a César Award nomination for Best Supporting Actress alongside Valérie Lemercier who was cast as Marie-Laurence Granianski. Carole Bouquet was also approached for the role. It was Françoise Menidrey, a casting director, who suggested that Jean-Marie Poiré and Alain Terzian see a performance of the play Un fil à la patte at the Théâtre du Palais-Royal and pay attention to one of the supporting actresses, Valérie Lemercier: Poiré and Terzian "laughed their head off" during the play and she was hired for the film.

This film marks the first collaboration of the quartet Poiré–Clavier–Reno–Lemercier, who were reunited in Les Visiteurs two years later, in 1993.

Many young actresses auditioned for the role of Isabelle Fourreau. Poiré finally chose Isabelle Renauld, who was at the beginning of her career.

To represent the President of the Republic, a character only seen from behind in the film, a "casting of skulls" was made to find an actor whose head looked closest to that of François Mitterrand.

=== Shooting ===
==== Stunts ====
Initially, the scenes taking place aboard the Citroën BX had to be made on a voiture travelling, a common filming technique where the actor pretends to drive the vehicle. However, in these conditions, the travelling car can only roll at low speed and this posed problems during the shooting of the scene on the national road, where the BX is supposed to roll at 140 km/h. Because the car was travelling slowly, they were overtaken by trucks that honked at them or flashed their lights, which made the filming impossible. Jean Reno himself made the decision to actually drive the BX 140 km/h on the national, among the flow of normal traffic, with a remote camera attached to the hood of the car and the sound recording equipment installed in the trunk. Also, with Jean Reno performing some "simple" stunts at the wheel of the BX, Christian Clavier's fears, as a passenger, were very real.

==== Cars ====
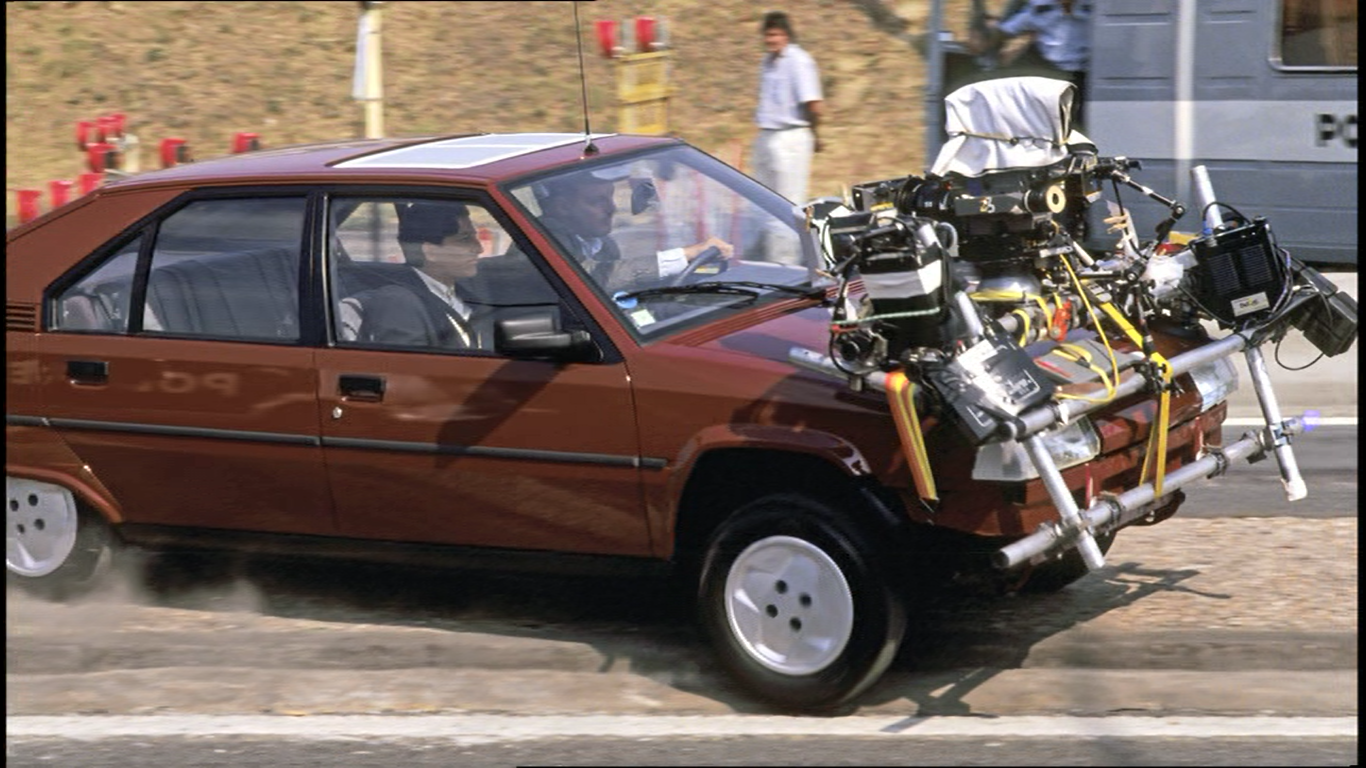
Filming of a scene with Jean Reno, Christian Clavier and the Citroën BX 16 TGS, colour Rouge Delage.

The film honors the Citroën range of the moment, where several contemporary models of the brand appear throughout this comedy (AX, BX, XM, CX EVASION Ambulance, C 25). All cars were loaned by Citroën:

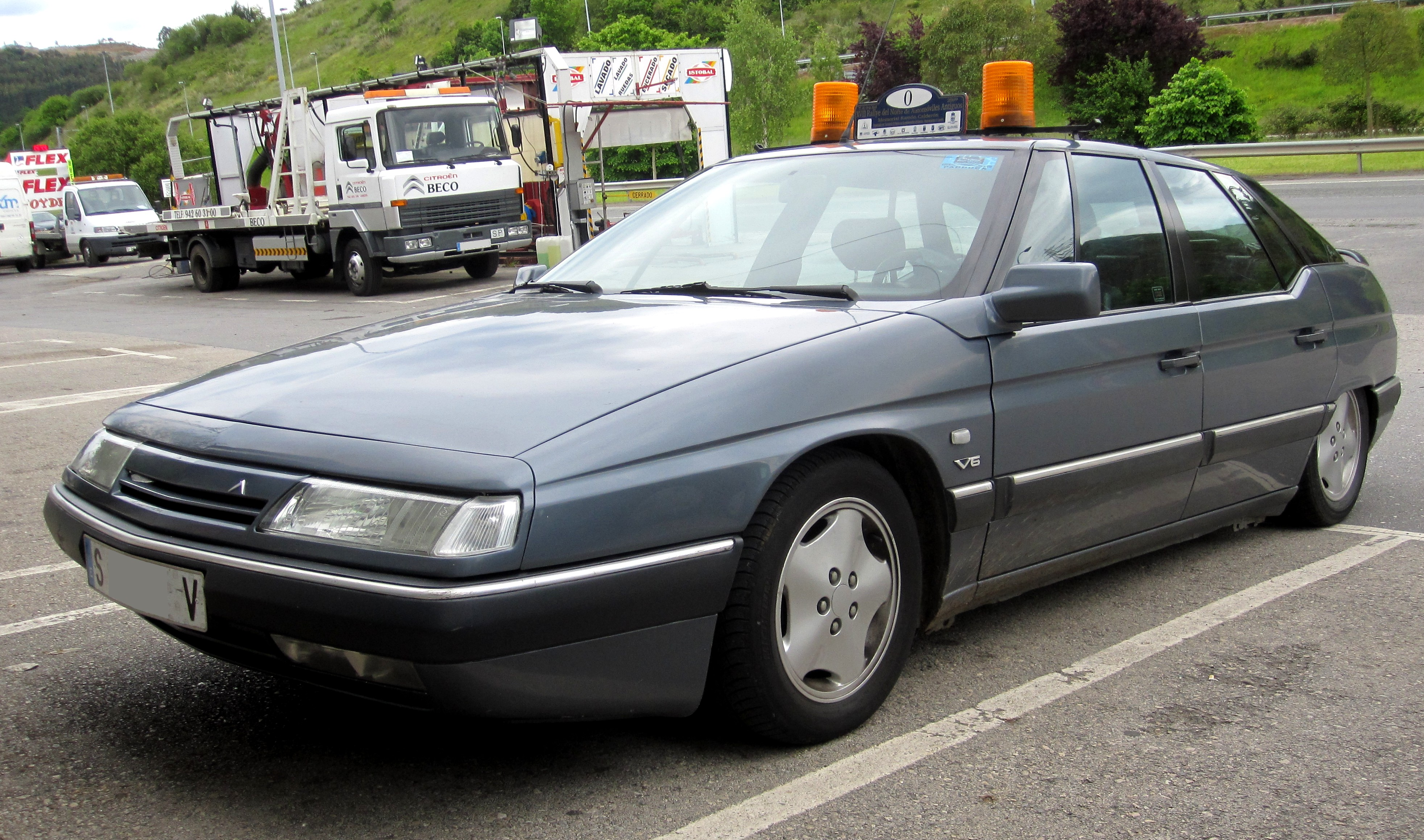
A Citroën XM similar to the one used by Général Masse.

- The Citroën BX Jean-Jacques Granianski (Christian Clavier) is a BX 16 TGS model 1990 Red Delage color. For the purposes of the film, no less than six BXs were used: a new BX with 2,000 km on the clock was used for "calm" scenes and on-board shots and, for the eventful or waterfall scenes, five other older cars have been made up to look like new. The car appears in the scene in the sunflower field and the BX used for this sequence is older because its interior is brown while it is gray in the new BX.
- The Citroën XM of General Masse (Jacques François) - that is offered to Jean-Jacques Granianski (Christian Clavier) at the end of the film, in compensation for the destruction of his BX brand new by the Squale (Jean Reno) - is an XM V6 finish "Ambiance" model 1990, pearl gray metallic varnished color. There was a small mistake in the shooting: during the first scene with this XM, where the Squale and General Masse start a conversation, the passenger seat and the passenger door panel of the car are velvet gray, unlike the driver's seat which is black leather.
- The van Citroën C25 of General Moulin (Jacques Dacqmine) is a C25E Combi Comfort model 1987, metallic Satellite Gray color varnished.

==== Filming locations ====
The scenes supposed to take place in Colombia were shot in Mexico. During one scene, the Mexican flag is visible on a building.

The Saviem SM 7 truck of occupational medicine, which acts as a "submarine" for DGSE agents, is parked in front of 74 avenue d'Iéna at Paris, in the 16th arrondissement, near the Arc de Triomphe. On his arrival to visit his wife Marie-Laurence (Valérie Lemercier) at the Consulate, Jean-Jacques Granianski (Christian Clavier) parks his Citroën BX in front of 74 avenue de Jena. The consulate is located opposite rue Auguste-Vacquerie.

When Le Squale (Jean Reno) returned to Paris by plane from Colombia, he landed at Orly West Airport. Later in the film, in this airport Le Squale accompanies Graninski for a weekend in Venice with Maryline.

The scenes where the Citroën BX rolls on the national road with Jean Reno and Christian Clavier on board take place on Route nationale 12 between the villages of Cherisy and Houdan.

The scenes taking place at the home of the Granianski are supposed to happen at Dreux, at the fictional address "24 avenue du Paris, residence Pompadour". In reality, the shooting took place on Allée des Terres Neuves in Croissy-sur-Seine.

The scene where the old lady enters the portal of a hospice was shot in Theuville, in the Val-d'Oise.

The Citroën XM of General Masse (Jacques François) is parked in the underground parking George V, Avenue George V in Paris 8th arrondissement. When Le Squale (Jean Reno) and Aspirant Garcia (Mireille Rufel) return to Paris after the explosion of the Granianski BX, and after abandoning it in the middle of the countryside, they park the SEAT Marbella level 41 avenue George V, at the time before Bank Hervé (now replaced by an Armani store). In the background, there is a poster of the film Bienvenue à bord!, a French film by Jean-Louis Leconte with Pierre Richard and Martin Lamotte, released in September 1990. Scenes are then shot at the Hotel Prince de Galles.

For the end of the film, many scenes were shot in the Parc Astérix and on its parking lot. A particular scene takes place on the aquatic attraction named at the time "The Descent of the Styx".

=== Dubbing ===
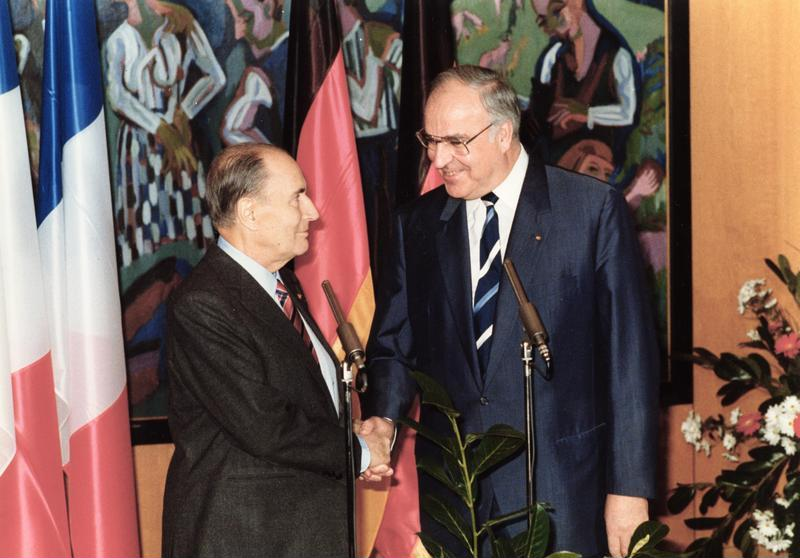
François Mitterrand and Helmut Kohl

Didier Gustin, at that time little known, imitates François Mitterrand and Helmut Kohl in a short scene, as they appear only from the back.

=== Music ===
Music for the film was composed by Eric Lévi, former member - and founder - of the group Shakin' Street, whose song "Solid As Rock", written by Fabienne Shine, appears in the film. The main song of the film, "Passion For War / Love", was written by R. Stone and Éric Lévi and sung by Joan Paladin (Joan Peltz).

The album containing the music from the film, titled simply Bande Originale du Film L'Opération Corned-Beef, was released the same year as the film.

Bande Originale du Film L'Opération Corned-Beef

Soundtrack album by Eric Lévi and various artists
- Released: France 21 February 1991
- Label: Versailles (division de Sony Music Entertainment France)
- Producer: Eric Lévi

Credits

All tracks are written by Eric Lévi.

No.	Title	Length
1.	"Taxi Ride in Bogota (1st version)"	02:21
2.	"La Veuve en noir"	00:45
3.	"No Deal"	04:02
4.	"Passion For War / Love" (sung by Joan Paladin)	03:44
5.	"Suspens"	00:38
6.	"Down Under"	01:02
7.	"Zargas"	00:36
8.	"Night Bite"	00:50
9.	"I Love Kisses" (with Frederick Rousseau)	00:45
10.	"I Love Kisses (instrumental version)" (with Frederick Rousseau)	00:44
11.	"Coney Island"	00:36
12.	"La Clef d'Herman" ( (Note: The track "La Clef d'Herman" is a nod to pianist Richard Clayderman.))	01:40
13.	"Bad Girl"	00:19
14.	"The Big Fall"	00:48
15.	"Zargas' Landing"	00:25
16.	"Zargas' Fallin"	00:38
17.	"Zargas' Parade"	01:00
18.	"Black Escort 1"	00:23
19.	"Black Escort 2"	00:19
20.	"Hang On"	01:14
21.	"Game's Over"	00:46
22.	"Passion For War / Love (instrumental version)"	03:49
23.	"Taxi Ride in Bogota (2nd version)"	02:11
24.	"Solid As Rock" (Shakin' Street)	04:12

== Release ==
=== Promotion ===
The trailer shows images from the film accompanied by a voice-over from Jean Reno (playing the role of Le Squale), sending an audio message to "My Dear Georges":

Dear Georges, I started this espionage mission in Bogota three weeks ago and it is one of the most formidable of all my career as an officer at the DGSE, serving France: spinning, manipulations various, kidnappings, murders, robberies, fake photos ... the routine, what! Everything was going well for the better when an unpredictable tile fell on my back, named Jean-Jacques Granianski. A priori the guy is very commonplace, it's an absolute zero ... Well, my old Georges, it's wrong: this guy is a calamity top level that jeopardizes the honor and safety of France. .. and who can even bring down the president; all for a ridiculous story of a good woman. He made me drool, believe me. So I have two solutions: to make it disappear or to drown it. I'll tell you more on February 6th. After this movie, The Bridge on the River Kwai will look like an intellectual movie.

— Philippe Boulier, called "The Squale" (Jean Reno), in the trailer of the film

=== Reception ===
Valérie Lemercier's performance was nominated for the César Award for Best Supporting Actress in the 17th César Awards. She did not win the César but two years later received it for her dual role in Les Visiteurs, Jean-Marie Poiré's next film.

=== Box office ===
L’Opération Corned Beef was placed 15th in the box-office of France in 1991, with 1,475,580 admissions. It grossed 23 million French francs in France.

== Awards ==
=== Nomination ===
- Césars 1992: César Award for Best Supporting Actress for Valérie Lemercier

== Around the film ==
- The scene at the beginning of the film where "Le Squale" negotiates with cocaine bag traffickers is a parody of advertising for Jacques Vabre's El Gringo café.
- The response "La dernière fois, avec l'opération Bateau coulé, on a été décodé très vite", pronounced by Jacques François, is an allusion to the Rainbow Warrior affair.
- The Colombian trafficker is pursued by the Shining Path, which is Peruvian, not Colombian.
- When Granianski visits his parents-in-law, Jean Reno and Dimitri Rougeul (Geoffroy, the son of Granianski) meet for a short time: they will meet again in 1994 to dub the film The Lion King in French as the roles of Mufasa and his son Simba.
- In Spain, following the success of the following film by Jean-Marie Poiré, Les Visiteurs, Operation Corned-Beef, which had not been released in this country, was released in cinemas in 1994, three years after the French release.
- Eight years after the release of the film, which unravels at Parc Astérix, Christian Clavier will play the role of Asterix in the film Asterix and Obelix Against Caesar.
- The nationality of Consul Burger is not specified, but because he speaks German, the red and white color of the flag fluttering on the facade of the consulate, and the Tyrolean uniforms of the staff, it is easy to assume that he is the Austrian consul. The portrait of Kurt Waldheim, former Austrian President, is present in his office.

== See also ==
- Directorate-General for External Security
- Direction de la surveillance du territoire
