= Jean-Claude Deret =

French writer, actor, and author

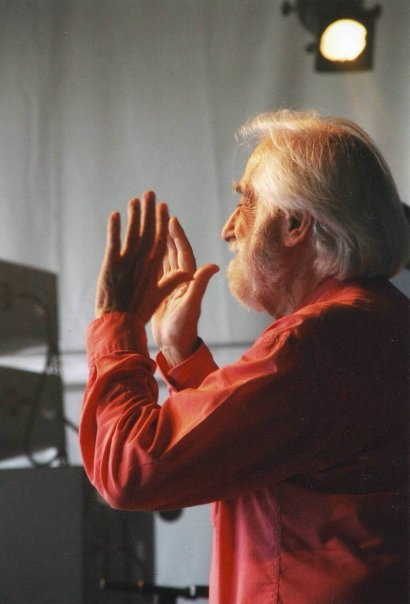
- Jean-Claude Deret in 2013
- Born: Claude Breitman; July 11, 1921; Paris, France
- Died: 12 December 2016 (aged 95); Paris, France
- Resting place: Père Lachaise Cemetery
- Occupations: Television writer, songwriter, actor, playwright, detective novelist, children's author
- Spouse: Céline Léger
- Children: 3

Jean-Claude Deret, born Claude Breitman, (July 11, 1921 – December 12, 2016) was a French television writer, songwriter, actor, playwright and author of children's books and detective novels.

== Early life ==
Jean-Claude Deret was born as Claude Breitman on July 11, 1921. His family were secular Jews from Russia. One of his great-grandfathers was a psychiatrist. He lost a relative in The Holocaust.

== Career ==
Deret started his career as a songwriter and singer in Saint-Germain-des-Prés in the late 1940s. By 1950, he emigrated to Quebec, where he became a theatre and television actor. Nine years later, in 1959, he returned to France and within a few years he created Thierry la Fronde, a television series. Between 1963 and 1966, he wrote 52 episodes.

Deret founded Le Théâtre du cercle, a theatre company in Saint-Gervais-la-Forêt. Additionally, he authored children's books and detective novels. He also wrote plays, including Samuel dans l'île, which was nominated for a Molière Award in 2006. Meanwhile, he continued to act, for example starring in Beautiful Memories in 2001. He wrote 50 songs over the course of his career, and performed at the Théâtre de Poche Montparnasse in April 2014. In 2016, he directed Salauds de pauvres, a short film about poor people in France.

== Personal life ==
Deret had three children, including actress Zabou Breitman with Céline Léger.

Deret died in Paris on December 12, 2016, age 95. He was cremated at the Père Lachaise Cemetery on December 17.
