= The Man of My Life =

- Film poster
- Directed by: Zabou Breitman
- Written by: Zabou Breitman; Agnès de Sacy
- Produced by: Philippe Godeau; Jean-Yves Asselin
- Starring: Bernard Campan; Charles Berling; Léa Drucker
- Cinematography: Michel Amathieu
- Edited by: Richard Marizy
- Production company: Pan-Européenne
- Distributed by: Wild Bunch Distribution
- Release date: 11 October 2006
- Running time: 114 minutes
- Country: France
- Language: French
- Budget: $7.3 million
- Box office: $5.3 million

The Man of My Life (French: L'Homme de sa vie) is a French film directed by Zabou Breitman, written by Breitman and Agnès de Sacy, and produced by Philippe Godeau. It was first released in 2006.

It stars Bernard Campan, Charles Berling, Léa Drucker and Jacqueline Jehanneuf.

== Cast ==
- Bernard Campan as Frédéric
- Charles Berling as Hugo
- Léa Drucker as Frédérique
- Jacqueline Jehanneuf as Jacqueline
- Éric Prat as Guillaume
- Niels Lexcellent as Arthur
- Anna Chalon as Capucine
- Antonin Chalon as Mathieu
- Léocadia Rodriguez-Henocq as Jeanne
- Caroline Gonce as Ilse
- Aurélie Guichard as Lucinda
- Philippe Lefebvre as Benoît
- Angie David as Anne-Sophie
- Gabrielle Atger as Pauline

== Production ==
Principal photography began on 30 May 2005 and was scheduled to last 41 days across the span of 8 weeks. Filming mostly took place in the south of the Drôme department and in the Vaucluse, as well as one week in Paris.

== Critical response ==
Review aggregation website Rotten Tomatoes reported an approval rating of 47%, based on 19 reviews, with an average score of 5.75/10. At Metacritic, which assigns a rating out of 100 to reviews from mainstream critics, the film received a score of 52, based on 4 reviews, indicating "mixed or average reviews".

== Accolades ==
Award / Film Festival	Category	Recipients and nominees	Result
Globes de Cristal Award	Best Actress	Léa Drucker	Won
