= Dan Simkovitch =

French actress (1954–2020)

- Born: Danièle Anne Fanny Šimkovič; 1954
- Died: 20 May 2020 (aged 65–66); Paris, France
- Occupation: Actress

Danièle Anne Fanny Šimkovič (1954 – 20 May 2020), known professionally as Dan Simkovitch, was a French actress.

== Biography ==
Simkovitch was born in 1954 to a family of Serbian origin. She rose to fame by portraying Madame Bellefeuille in the television series Les Filles d'à côté and Les Nouvelles Filles d'à côté. In 1991, she appeared alongside Christian Clavier in the film L'Opération Corned-Beef. In 1992, she appeared in the Antoine de Caunes television program Nulle part ailleurs. She was in the 2005 TV movie Un prof en cuisine.

Simkovitch directed a short film titled Scène. In 2007, she was in the Western film Big City. In spring 2008, she had a solo performance in Dolly Prasne voit la vie en rose. She wrote multiple short stories and plays, some of which have been broadcast on France Inter. Throughout her career, she appeared in numerous programs featuring the fictional country Groland. In 2013, Simkovitch was in the France 2 television series Y'a pas Âge, directed by Jérôme Commandeur.

Dan Simkovitch died in Paris on 20 May 2020.

== Filmography ==
=== Television ===
- La hija de los lobos (1991)
- Nulle part ailleurs (1992)
- Les Filles d'à côté (1993–1995)
- Les Nouvelles Filles d'à côté (1995)
- Un prof en cuisine (2005)
- Y'a pas d'âge (2013)
- Norbert, commis d'office (2015)
- Les Mystères de l'amour (2017)

=== Film ===
- L'Opération Corned-Beef (1991)
- Big City (2007)
- Un air de Vian (2010)

== Theatre ==
- Dolly Prasne voit la vie en rose (2008)
- Comment je vais bien (2014)
