= Isabelle Renauld =

French actress

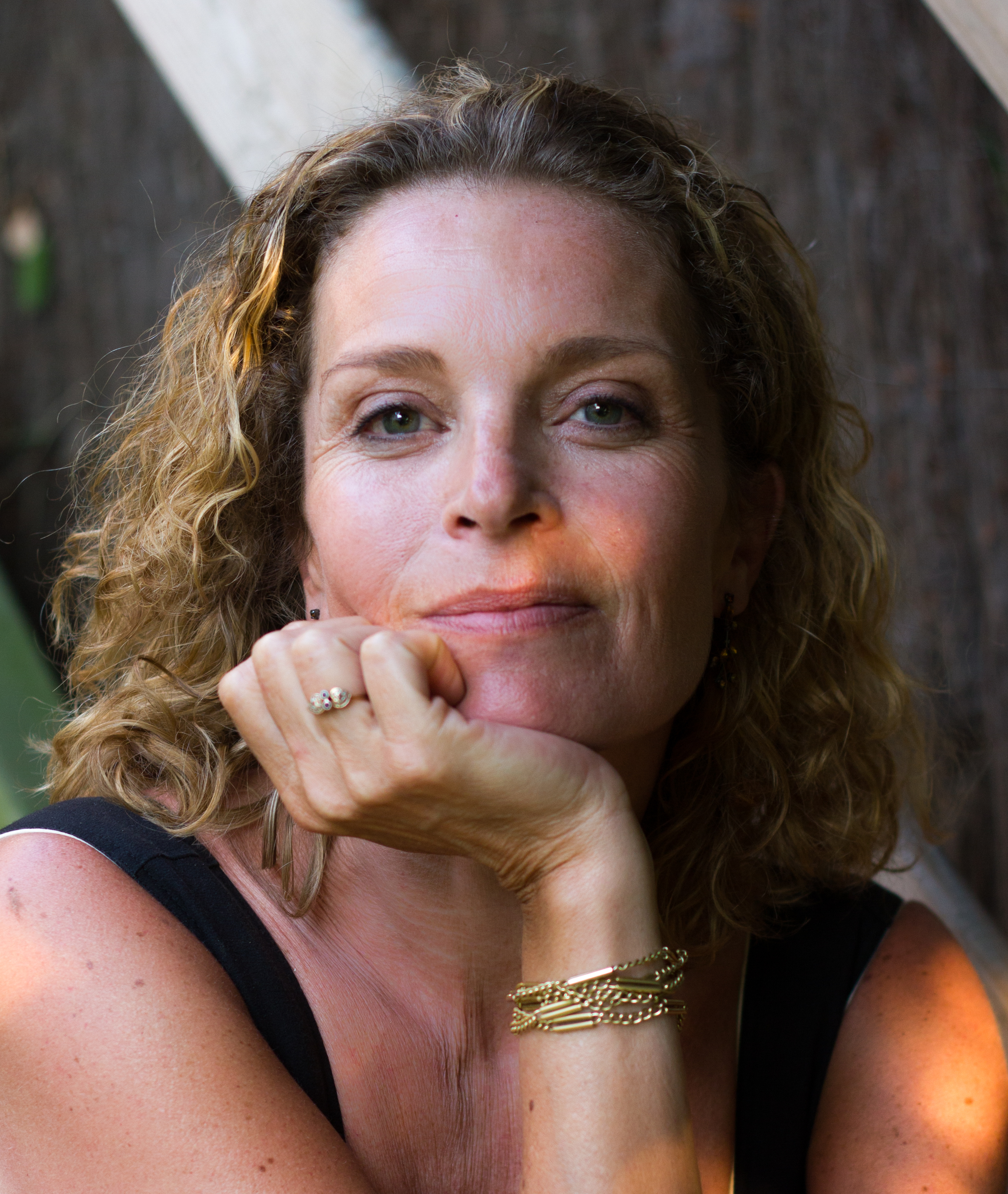
Isabelle Renauld

Isabelle Renauld (French: [ʁəno]) is a French actress. She is best known for her role in Parfait amour! by Catherine Breillat, which earned her the Prix Michel-Simon.

== Early lifeand education ==
Isabelle Renauld was born in Saint-Malo, France, to a pharmacist father and a mother who was an IFOP researcher. Her parents divorced when she was five years old and she grew up with her mother and older sister.

At the age of 16 Renauld decided to leave Brittany to devote herself to acting in Paris. She was admitted to the "free class" of the Cours Florent drama school in 1984. She then applied and won a place at the Théâtre Nanterre-Amandiers theatre school, run by Pierre Romans and Patrice Chéreau.

== Career ==
In 1990, Renauld landed the role of Isabelle in L'Opération Corned-Beef alongside Jean Reno and Christian Clavier. She rose to prominence in 1996 with Parfait amour! (Perfect Love) by Catherine Breillat, which earned her the Prix Michel-Simon.

In 1997 she met Greek filmmaker Theo Angelopoulos, and was cast in his Eternity and a Day (1998), which received the Golden Palm at Cannes.

She has also appeared in films by François Dupeyron and Philippe Lioret.

== Recognition and honours ==
Renauld was made a Knight of the Order of Arts and Letters in January 2010.

== Selected filmography ==
Film
Year	Title	Role	Notes
2011	All Our Desires		
2006	I'm Fine, Don't Worry		
2005	Let's Be Friends	Sophie	
2003	Monsieur Ibrahim		
2001	The Officers' Ward		
2000	Murderous Maids		
1998	Eternity and a Day		
1996	Perfect Love (Parfait Amour)	Frédérique	
1991	L'Opération Corned-Beef	Lieutenant Isabelle Fourreau	
1989	Chimère		
1987	Hôtel de France		

Television
Year	Title	Role	Notes
2000	Joséphine, ange gardien	Christine	TV series (1 Episode : "Une famille pour Noël")
2005	Joséphine, ange gardien	Isabelle	TV series (1 Episode : "Trouvez-moi le prince charmant!")
