= Delphine de Vigan =

French novelist (born 1966)

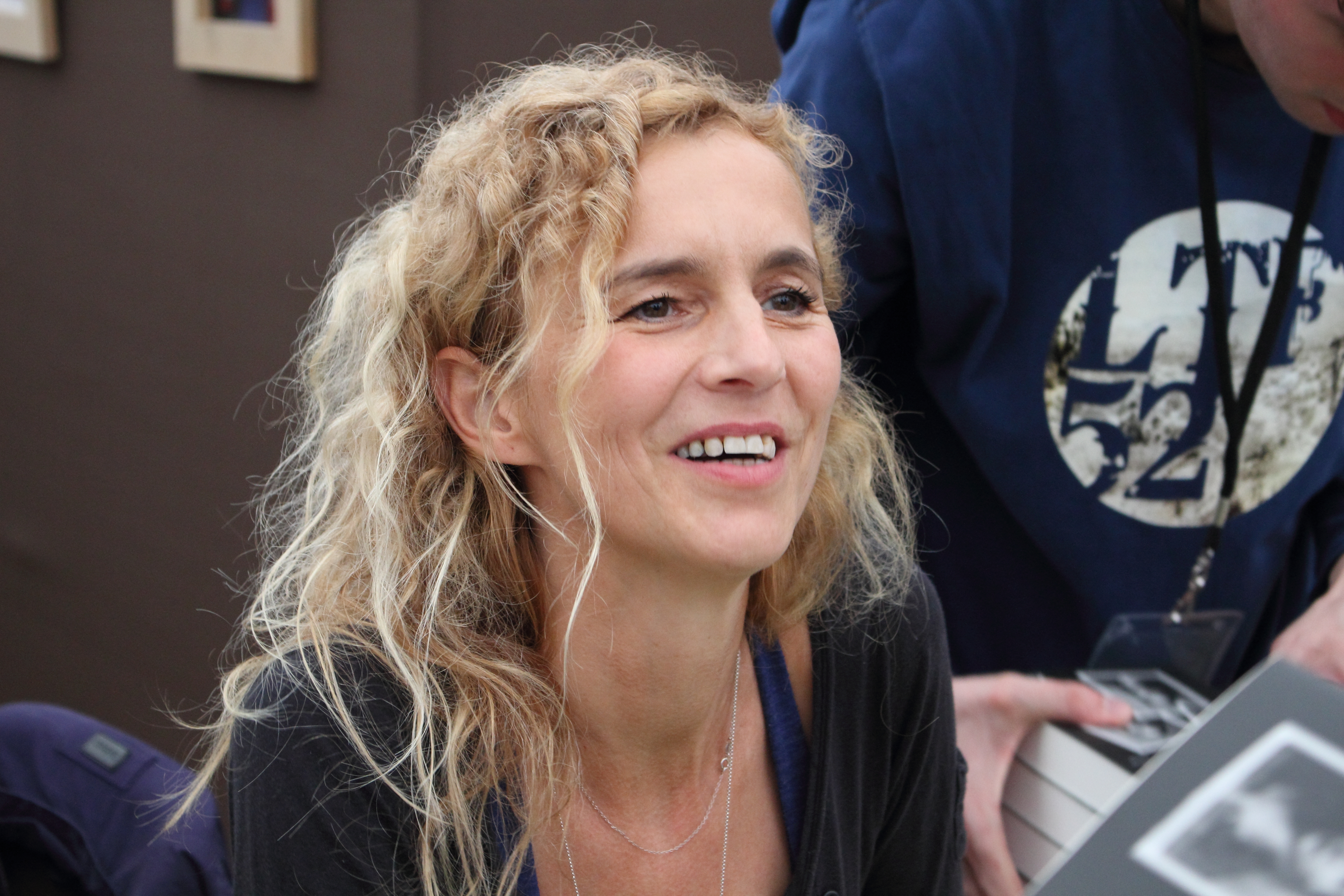
- Le Livre sur la Place, 2015
- Born: 1 March 1966 (age 60); Boulogne-Billancourt, France
- Occupation: Novelist
- Partner: François Busnel
- Children: 2
- Writing career
- Pen name: Lou Delvig
- Language: French
- Period: 2001–present
- Notable works: No and Me; Nothing Holds Back the Night
- Notable awards: Prix Goncourt des Lycéens Prix des libraires (2009)

Delphine de Vigan (born 1 March 1966) is an internationally known French novelist who has won several awards.

== Life and works ==
De Vigan wrote her first four novels by night while working at a public opinion firm in Alfortville by day. Her first published work, Jours sans faim (2001), was published under the pseudonym Lou Delvig, although since then she has written under her own name.

Her breakthrough work was No et moi (2007), in which she depicts the life of a young homeless woman from the point of view of a highly gifted thirteen-year-old girl. The book which won the Rotary International Prize in 2009 as well as France's prestigious Prix des libraires. The novel was translated into twenty languages and a film adaptation was released in 2010 (No et moi directed by Zabou Breitman). Following the book's success, she became a full-time professional writer.

De Vigan's central theme is the trauma and the damage that adult behaviour does to children. In 2011, her novel Rien ne s'oppose à la nuit (Nothing holds back the night), which deals with a family coping with a woman's bipolar disorder, won another clutch of French literary prizes, including the prix du roman Fnac, the prix Roman France Télévisions, the Grand prix des lectrices de Elle, and the Prix Renaudot des lycéens.

In 2015, she received the Prix Renaudot as well as the Prix Goncourt des Lycéens for D'après une histoire vraie (Based on a true story). In it, the question of what truth or fiction means in the process of writing is addressed. The author befriends an enigmatic woman who slowly becomes more and more like her, while her own ability to write slips away. Roman Polański made a film of the book named Based on a True Story in 2017.

In 2018, her novel Les Loyautés (Loyalties) was published, which tells the story of young Theo, who suffers from difficult family circumstances after his parents' divorce. Out of excessive demands, he begins to drink alcohol in large quantities. He falls into a fatal downward spiral, into which he drags his best friend.

In her 2019 novel Les Gratitudes (Gratitudes), de Vigan tells of a woman who loses her speech in old age. She thinks back to the couple who rescued her, the child Mishka, from the Nazis at the time, and is increasingly filled with a desire to thank them for it after the fact.

In her most recent novel, The Children Are Kings (2022), Vigan uses a detective story to address the lives of child influencers who are marketed to by their mother on YouTube. The filming of the adaptation of the novel is currently in preparation by Disney+.

== Bibliography ==
=== Novels ===
- Jours sans faim, Éditions Grasset, 2001 (under the pseudonym Lou Delvig); (Days Without Hunger)
- Les Jolis Garçons, JC Lattès, 2005 (The Pretty Boys)
- Un soir de décembre, Jean-Claude Lattès, 2005 (One Night in December)
- No et moi, Jean-Claude Lattès, 2007 (No and me, Bloomsbury 2010)
- Sous le manteau, Flammarion, 2008 (contributor)
- Les Heures souterraines, Jean-Claude Lattès, 2009 (Underground Time, Bloomsbury 2011)
- Rien ne s'oppose à la nuit, Jean-Claude Lattès, 2011 (Nothing Holds Back the Night, Bloomsbury 2014)
- D'après une histoire vraie, Jean-Claude Lattès, 2015 (Based on a True Story, Bloomsbury 2017)
- Les Loyautés, Jean-Claude Lattès, 2018 (Loyalties, Bloomsbury 2019)
- Les Gratitudes, Jean-Claude Lattès, 2019 (Gratitude, Bloomsbury 2021)
- Les enfants sont rois, Gallimard, 2021 (Kids Run the Show, Europa Editions 2023)

=== Screenplays ===
- You Will Be My Son (2011) (with Gilles Legrand)

== Les prix ==
- 2006 Prix Saint-Valentin
- 2008 Prix des libraires
- 2009 Prix Rotary International
- 2009 Prix Solidarité
- 2011 Prix du roman Fnac
- 2011 Prix Roman France Télévisions
- 2011 Prix Renaudot des lycéens
- 2012 Le Grand Prix des lectrices de Elle
- 2015 Prix Renaudot
- 2015 Prix Goncourt des Lycéens
- 2016 Officer of the Order of Arts and Letters
