= Murderous Maids =

Les Blessures assassines
- Film poster
- Directed by: Jean-Pierre Denis
- Screenplay by: Jean-Pierre Denis; Michèle Pétin
- Based on: L'affaire Papin by Paulette Houdyer
- Produced by: Laurent Pétin; Michèle Pétin
- Starring: Sylvie Testud; Julie-Marie Parmentier; Isabelle Renauld; François Levantal; Dominique Labourier; Jean-Gabriel Nordmann; Marie Donnio; Nadia Barentin
- Cinematography: Jean-Marc Fabre
- Edited by: Marie-Hélène Dozo
- Production companies: ARP Sélection; StudioCanal
- Distributed by: ARP Sélection
- Release date: 22 November 2000
- Running time: 94 minutes
- Country: France
- Language: French
- Budget: $4.1 million
- Box office: $2.9 million

Murderous Maids (French: Les blessures assassines) is a 2000 French film directed by Jean-Pierre Denis, which tells the true story of two French maids, Christine and Lea Papin. The screenplay by Jean-Pierre Denis with Michèle Pétin, was based on the book L'affaire Papin by Paulette Houdyer. It told the story of the double murder committed by the maids, which made sensational headlines in France in 1933. The film had 360,846 admissions in France.

== Plot ==
Christine Papin (Sylvie Testud), and Léa Papin (Julie-Marie Parmentier) are sisters with a troubled past, who work as maids in Le Mans, France. After a string of domestic jobs, they start working for the Lancelin family, which consists of Monsieur Lancelin, his wife and their adult daughter Genevieve. Christine sees in Madame Lancelin a mother figure, in spite of her severity. But their wretched background — an indifferent mother, a drunken, abusive father and time spent in orphanages — casts a shadow over the girls. Over time, their ill-fated situation darkens and they withdraw into themselves. Finally, after six years of service, they end up committing a particularly brutal crime on February 2, 1933: killing Madame Lancelin and her daughter after gouging their eyes out.

== Cast ==
- Sylvie Testud as Christine Papin
- Julie-Marie Parmentier as Léa Papin
- Isabelle Renauld as Clémence
- François Levantal as Le Gazé
- Dominique Labourier as Madame Lancelin
- Jean-Gabriel Nordmann as M. Lancelin
- Marie Donnio as Geneviève Lancelin
- Michaël Abiteboul as Etienne
- Nadia Barentin as La mère supérieure

== Reception ==
On the review aggregator website Rotten Tomatoes, the film holds an approval rating of 90%, based on 51 reviews, with an average rating of 7.3/10.

== Awards and nominations ==
Sylvie Testud won the César Award for Most Promising Actress in 2001 for her performance as Christine Papin. The film was nominated for the César for best film, and Jean-Pierre Denis for best director.
