= L'Entente Cordiale =

2006 French spy comedy film

- Theatrical release poster
- Directed by: Vincent De Brus
- Written by: Vincent De Brus
- Produced by: Christian Fechner
- Starring: Christian Clavier; Daniel Auteuil; François Levantal; Jennifer Saunders; John Cleese; François Morel
- Cinematography: Laurent Machuel
- Edited by: Sylvie Gadmer
- Music by: Jean-Claude Camors
- Production companies: Les Films Christian Fechner; France 2 Cinéma
- Distributed by: Warner Bros. Pictures
- Release date: 21 June 2006
- Running time: 100 minutes
- Country: France
- Languages: French; English
- Budget: €18.2 million
- Box office: $2.7 million

L'Entente Cordiale (lit. 'The Cordial Agreement') is a 2006 French spy comedy film written and directed by Vincent De Brus. The title is a reference to Entente Cordiale, a series of agreements signed on 8 April 1904 between the United Kingdom and France. The film stars Christian Clavier and Daniel Auteuil, along with British actors Jennifer Saunders and John Cleese.

The film was released in France on 21 June 2006 by Warner Bros. Pictures. It flopped at the French box-office, drawing around 113.573 admissions.

== Cast ==
- Christian Clavier as François de La Conche
- Daniel Auteuil as Jean-Pierre Moindrau
- François Levantal as Lieutenant Jean-Éric Berthaud
- Jennifer Saunders as Gwendoline McFarlane
- John Cleese as Lord Conrad
- François Morel as Elliot de Saint-Hilaire
