= A Wonderful Spell =

- French: Folle embellie
- Directed by: Dominique Cabrera
- Written by: Dominique Cabrera; Antoine Montperrin
- Produced by: Ann Bernier; Emmanuel Giraud; Catherine Hannoun; Laurent Pétin; Michèle Pétin; Joseph Rouschop; Christopher Zimmer
- Starring: Miou-Miou; Jean-Pierre Léaud; Julie-Marie Parmentier; Yolande Moreau
- Cinematography: Hélène Louvart
- Edited by: Sophie Brunet
- Music by: Milan Kymlicka
- Release date: 7 July 2004
- Running time: 110 minutes
- Countries: France; Switzerland; Canada
- Language: French

A Wonderful Spell (French: Folle embellie) is a French-Swiss-Canadian film directed by Dominique Cabrera.

== Plot ==
Following a German raid during World War II the inmates of a psychiatric hospital in Flanders elude their overseers. In spite of their issues they strive to rejoin the normal citizens.

== Cast ==
- Miou-Miou: Alida
- Jean-Pierre Léaud: Fernand
- Morgan Marinne: Julien
- Marilyne Canto: Colette
- Julie-Marie Parmentier: Lucie
- Yolande Moreau: Hélène
- Gabriel Arcand: Moïse
- Philippe Grand'Henry: Florent
- Pascale Montpetit: Henriette
- Olivier Gourmet: the head physician

== Release ==
In the UK a version with English subtitles was released.
