= A Leap in the Dark =

- Directed by: Marco Bellocchio
- Written by: Marco Bellocchio; Piero Natoli; Vincenzo Cerami
- Produced by: Anna Maria Clementelli; Silvio Clementelli
- Starring: Michel Piccoli; Anouk Aimée
- Cinematography: Giuseppe Lanci
- Edited by: Brigitte Sousselier
- Music by: Nicola Piovani
- Distributed by: Cineriz
- Release date: 14 February 1980
- Running time: 120 minutes
- Country: Italy
- Language: Italian

A Leap in the Dark (Italian: Salto nel vuoto, and also known as Leap Into the Void) is a 1980 Italian film written and directed by Marco Bellocchio. It stars Michel Piccoli and Anouk Aimée, who won the Best Actor and Best Actress prizes respectively at the 1980 Cannes Film Festival. The film also won the David di Donatello for Best Director and was selected as the Italian entry for the Best Foreign Language Film at the 53rd Academy Awards, but was not accepted as a nominee.

== Plot ==
Judge Mauro Ponticelli has been raised by his older sister Marta. However, Marta has been having mental problems and fantasizing about committing suicide, which concerns him greatly. Mauro himself is very busy with his job and is in turn complexed by his life to the limits of hermitism.

Marta seems to recover when Mauro introduces her to Giovanni Sciabola, a young brilliant actor with a criminal record: the two turn friends and Giovanni takes Marta out with him very often. Mauro then finds himself becoming jealous of their relationship and, feeling even betrayed, dreams of being able to kill her by pushing her from the window of their home. Fearing that being close to Giovanni Marta might squander large sums of money, Mauro signs an arrest warrant against the young man, who, after vandalizing Mauro's office, runs away.

The friendship with Giovanni restored Marta's security, and she decides to leave her brother's house. Realizing that Marta has gained an autonomy that he had hoped she could never obtain, Mauro completely loses his lucidity and commits suicide by throwing himself through the window of his house, in the way he had imagined to get rid of his sister.

== Cast ==
- Michel Piccoli - Mauro Ponticelli
- Anouk Aimée - Marta Ponticelli
- Michele Placido - Giovanni Sciabola
- Gisella Burinato - Anna
- Antonio Piovanelli - Quasimodo
- Anna Orso - Marilena
- Pier Giorgio Bellocchio - Giorgio

== Production ==
Philippe Noiret was originally announced as the actor playing Mauro.

== Reception ==
=== Critical response ===
The film was favourably reviewed by the eminent critic Pauline Kael in The New Yorker : " The protagonist of Leap - a judge, Mauro Ponticelli, played by the usually suave French actor Michel Piccoli - is mean in perverse, Bunuelian ways...Mauro has always been protected and cared for by his older sister, Marta..He has no intention of growing up...[her] unusual behaviour has actually been a sign that she is rebelling - that she's struggling to free herself from her deathly bondage to him... The movie is about family entanglements and the functions of madness...Mauro is a craven fraud...Mauro the judge is a worm : a spoiled worm wriggling in its comfortable nest...Piccoli is able to give this mesmerizing performance despite the fact that he and Anouk Aimée are dubbed into Italian...Anouk Aimée is usually strikingly beautiful and a little blank - not quite in contact;.. But she's a magnificent camera subject, and her remoteness fits the situation here..Leap Into the Void is a film about people who are out of control made by a director who's in as close to total control as a moviemaker is ever likely to be..there's greatness in it."

=== Awards ===
- David di Donatello Awards
  - 1980: David di Donatello for Best Director to Marco Bellocchio
- Cannes Film Festival
  - 1980: Best Actress Award to Anouk Aimée
  - 1980: Best Actor Award to Michel Piccoli

== See also ==
- List of submissions to the 53rd Academy Awards for Best Foreign Language Film
- List of Italian submissions for the Academy Award for Best Foreign Language Film
