= Beautiful Memories =

2001 film by Zabou Breitman

- Film poster
- Se souvenir des belles choses
- Directed by: Zabou Breitman
- Screenplay by: Zabou Breitman; Jean-Claude Deret
- Produced by: Stéphane Marsil
- Starring: Isabelle Carré; Bernard Campan; Bernard Le Coq; Zabou Breitman
- Cinematography: Dominique Chapuis
- Edited by: Bernard Sasia
- Music by: Ferenc Javori
- Production companies: Hugo Films; France 3 Cinéma; Les Films de la Colombe; Les Productions de la Guéville
- Distributed by: Pan-Européenne Distribution
- Release date: 9 January 2002
- Running time: 110 minutes
- Country: France
- Language: French
- Budget: $4.2 million
- Box office: $2.8 million

Beautiful Memories (French: Se souvenir des belles choses) is a 2001 French film directed by Zabou Breitman. It won the César Awards for Best First Feature Film, Best Actress and Best Supporting Actor, and was nominated for Best Actor. Also, the French Syndicate of Cinema Critics named it best debut film.

== Plot ==
Claire Poussin, a young woman in her early 30s whose mother has recently died from Alzheimer's, has been having memory loss problems since being struck by lightning. She believes she is showing the first signs of the disease, but her sister Nathalie thinks the problem is temporary. Claire seeks help by entering a clinic for people with memory-loss problems, which is located in a big country house and run by Prof. Christian Licht. Prof. Licht is having an affair with therapist Marie Bjorg, which he thinks is hidden from his patients, but isn't. At the clinic, Claire meets Philippe, a noted wine expert who is traumatized following a car accident which killed his wife and child, and they fall in love. When both of them are released, they move in together, but find that their condition severely affects their lives. Philippe recovers his memory, and is pained when he remembers the tragic accident, while Claire's condition becomes worse.

== Cast ==
- Isabelle Carré as Claire Poussin
- Bernard Campan as Philippe
- Bernard Le Coq as Prof. Christian Licht
- Zabou Breitman as Marie Bjorg
- Anne Le Ny as Nathalie Poussin
- Dominique Pinon as Robert
- Aude Briant as Corinne
- Denys Granier-Deferre as Toto
- François Levantal as Daniel
- Jean-Claude Deret as Léo Finkel
- Céline Léger as Sarah
- Julien Courbey as Stéphane
- Guilaine Londez as Isabelle

== Accolades ==
Award / Film Festival	Category	Recipients and nominees	Result	Ref.
César Awards	Best Actress	Isabelle Carré	Won	
César Awards	Best Actor	Bernard Campan	Nominated	
César Awards	Best Supporting Actor	Bernard Le Coq	Won	
César Awards	Best First Feature Film		Won	
Cabourg Film Festival	Best New Actor	Bernard Campan	Won	
French Syndicate of Cinema Critics	Best First French Film		Won	
Lumière Awards	Best Actress	Isabelle Carré	Won	
