= Anna M. =

2007 film directed by Michel Spinosa

- Directed by: Michel Spinosa
- Written by: Michel Spinosa
- Produced by: Patrick Sobelman
- Starring: Isabelle Carré; Gaëlle Bona; Geneviève Mnich; Gilbert Melki
- Cinematography: Alain Duplantier
- Edited by: Chantal Hymans
- Release date: 14 February 2007 (Berlin International Film Festival)
- Country: France
- Language: French
- Budget: 3.6 million
- Box office: $796.466

Anna M. is a 2007 French thriller film, written and directed by Michel Spinosa and starring Isabelle Carré and Gilbert Melki.

== Plot ==
Anna, a somewhat introverted woman, becomes obsessed with the orthopedic surgeon who helped with her recuperation following a car accident. Incorrectly believing the love to be reciprocated, she embarks on several attempts to stay in touch with him but, after several rejections, finds herself descending into despair and, ultimately, hatred.

== Cast ==
- Isabelle Carré - Anna M.
- Gaëlle Bona - Éléonore
- Geneviève Mnich - Anna's mother
- Gilbert Melki - Dr. André Zanevsky
- Anne Consigny - Mrs. Zanevsky
- Pascal Bongard - The inspector
- Samir Guesmi - The receptionist
- Francis Renaud - Albert
- Éric Savin - The father

== Reaction ==
Anthony Quinn, writing for The Independent, gave the film three out of five stars. Film4 gave it the same, calling it "entertaining".

== Awards and nominations ==
- César Awards (France)
  - Nominated: Best Actress – Leading Role (Isabelle Carré)
- Étoile d'Or (France)
  - Won: Best Actress (Isabelle Carré)

== See also ==
- Erotomania
