= Happily Ever After (2004 film) =

- Theatrical release poster
- Directed by: Yvan Attal
- Written by: Yvan Attal
- Produced by: Claude Berri; Pierre Grunstein; Nathalie Rheims
- Starring: Charlotte Gainsbourg; Yvan Attal; Alain Chabat; Alain Cohen; Emmanuelle Seigner; Johnny Depp
- Cinematography: Rémy Chevrin
- Edited by: Jennifer Augé
- Music by: Brad Mehldau
- Distributed by: Pathé Distribution
- Release date: 25 August 2004
- Running time: 105 minutes
- Country: France
- Languages: Italian; French; English
- Budget: $9.2 million
- Box office: $13.4 million

Happily Ever After (French: Ils se marièrent et eurent beaucoup d'enfants; Translation: They married and had many children) is a 2004 French comedy drama film. The film was written and directed by Yvan Attal, produced by Claude Berri, and stars Charlotte Gainsbourg and Yvan Attal.

It was released in English in North America. For English-speaking audiences, the film is highly recognizable for the lengthy cameo appearance of Johnny Depp, who speaks fluent French.

The soundtrack also features Radiohead.

== Plot ==
Happily Ever After dissects the viability of fidelity through the story of three buddies and their tumultuous relationships with the opposite sex.

The film opens with the central characters, Vincent (Yvan Attal) and Gabrielle (Charlotte Gainsbourg) capriciously flirting in a bar. Vincent appears to win the affection of Gabrielle over many other potential courters, but the entire exercise is a ruse; they are actually married with a child.

The rest of the film explores the nature of romance, marriage, happiness, expectations in life, how love and sex interrelate, and ultimately, why no one can feel fulfilled.

== Cast ==
- Charlotte Gainsbourg as Gabrielle
- Yvan Attal as Vincent
- Alain Chabat as Georges
- Emmanuelle Seigner as Nathalie
- Alain Cohen as Frédéric
- Ben Attal as Joseph
- Angie David as the mistress
- Aurore Clément as the mistress's mother
- Anouk Aimée as Vincent's mother
- Claude Berri as Vincent's father
- Nicolas Vaude as The disgruntled viewer
- Luis Saguar as Casper
- Johnny Depp as L'inconnu

== Reception ==
Review aggregation website Rotten Tomatoes gives the film a 57% approval rating based on 42 reviews, with an average rating of 6.01/10. The site's critics consensus reads: "Though this French film features good acting, it lacks the wit and charm one would expect to see." Roger Ebert notes "Nothing happens in Happily Ever After that I cared much about."
