= 1980 Cannes Film Festival =

- Official poster of the 33rd Cannes Film Festival, an original illustration by Michel Landi.
- Opening film: Fantastica
- Closing film: I'm Photogenic
- Location: Cannes, France
- Founded: 1946
- Awards: Palme d'Or: All That Jazz; Kagemusha
- No. of films: 23 (In Competition)
- Festival date: 9 May 1980 – 23 May 1980
- Website: festival-cannes.com/en

Cannes Film Festival
- 1981 1979

The 33rd Cannes Film Festival took place from 9 and 23 May 1980. American actor Kirk Douglas served as jury president for the main competition. During the festival the showing of Andrei Tarkovsky's film Stalker was notoriously interrupted by an electricians strike.

The Palme d'Or, the festival's top prize, was jointly awarded to All That Jazz by Bob Fosse and Kagemusha by Akira Kurosawa.

The festival opened with Fantastica by Gilles Carle, and closed with I'm Photogenic by Dino Risi.

== Juries ==
=== Main Competition ===
- Kirk Douglas, American actor - Jury President
- Ken Adam, British production designer
- Robert Benayoun, French film critic and author
- Veljko Bulajić, Yugoslavian filmmaker
- Leslie Caron, French actress and dancer
- Charles Champlin, American film critic and writer
- André Delvaux, Belgium filmmaker
- Albina du Boisrouvray, French producer
- Gian Luigi Rondi, Italian writer
- Michael Spencer, Canadian producer and filmmaker

== Official selection ==
=== In Competition ===
The following feature films competed for the Palme d'Or:

English title	Original title	Director(s)	Production country
All That Jazz		Bob Fosse	United States
Being There		Hal Ashby	United States
The Big Red One		Samuel Fuller	United States
Breaker Morant		Bruce Beresford	Australia
Bye Bye Brazil	Bye Bye Brasil	Carlos Diegues	Brazil, France, Argentina
The Constant Factor	Constans	Krzysztof Zanussi	Poland
Dedicatoria		Jaime Chávarri	Spain
Ek Din Pratidin	এক দিন প্রতিদিন	Mrinal Sen	India
Fantastica (opening film)		Gilles Carle	France, Canada
The Heiresses	Örökség	Márta Mészáros	Hungary
Jaguar		Lino Brocka	Philippines
Kagemusha	影武者	Akira Kurosawa	Japan
A Leap in the Dark	Salto nel vuoto	Marco Bellocchio	Italy
The Long Riders		Walter Hill	United States
Loulou		Maurice Pialat	France
The Missing Link	Le Chaînon manquant	Picha	Belgium, France
My American Uncle	Mon oncle d'Amérique	Alain Resnais	France
Out of the Blue		Dennis Hopper	United States, Canada
Put on Ice	Kaltgestellt	Bernhard Sinkel	West Germany
Every Man for Himself	Sauve qui peut (la vie)	Jean-Luc Godard	France, Austria, West Germany, Switzerland
Special Treatment	Посебан третман	Goran Paskaljević	Yugoslavia
La terrazza		Ettore Scola	Italy
A Week's Vacation	Une semaine de vacances	Bertrand Tavernier	France

=== Un Certain Regard ===
The following films were selected for the Un Certain Regard section:

English title	Original title	Director(s)	Production country
Ballad of Tara	چریکه تارا	Bahram Beyzai	Iran
The Candidate	Der Kandidat	Volker Schlöndorff	West Germany
Christopher's House	Kristoffers hus	Lars Lennart Forsberg	Sweden
Csontváry		Zoltán Huszárik	Hungary
Days of Dreams	Дани од снова	Vlatko Gilić	Yugoslavia
La femme enfant	Die Stumme Liebe	Raphaële Billetdoux	France, West Germany
The Gamekeeper		Ken Loach	United Kingdom
Portrait of a '60% Perfect Man': Billy Wilder	Portrait d'un homme 'à 60% parfait': Billy Wilder	Annie Tresgot and Michel Ciment	France
The Rabbit Case	Causa králík	Jaromil Jireš	Czechoslovakia
Sitting Ducks		Henry Jaglom	United States
To Love the Damned	Maledetti vi amerò	Marco Tullio Giordana	Italy
Ways in the Night	Wege in der Nacht	Krzysztof Zanussi	West Germany
The Willi Busch Report	Der Willi-Busch-Report	Niklaus Schilling	West Germany

=== Out of Competition ===
The following films were selected to be screened out of competition:

English title	Original title	Director(s)	Production country
Breaking Glass		Brian Gibson	United Kingdom
City of Women	La città delle donne	Federico Fellini	Italy
I'm Photogenic (closing film)	Sono fotogenico	Dino Risi	Italy
Lightning Over Water		Wim Wenders and Nicholas Ray	West Germany, Sweden
Nezha Conquers the Dragon King	哪吒闹海	Wang Shuchen, Yan Dingxian, Xu Jingda	China
Public Telephone	Téléphone public	Jean-Marie Périer	France
The Risk of Living	Le risque de vivre	Gérald Calderon	France
Stalker	Сталкер	Andrei Tarkovsky	Soviet Union
Stir		Stephen Wallace	Australia
SuperTotò		Brando Giordani and Emilio Ravel	Italy

=== Short Films Competition ===
The following short films competed for the Short Film Palme d'Or:

- Arrêt momentané by Marie-France Siegler
- The Beloved by Michel Bouchard
- The Performer by Norma Bailey
- Grandomaniya by Nikolay Todorov
- Krychle by Zdenek Smetana
- Magyar kepek by Csaba Szórády
- La Petite enfance du cinéma by Joël Farges
- Rails by Manolo Otero
- Scheherazade by Susan Casey and Nancy Naschke
- Seaside Woman by Oscar Grillo
- Sky Dance by Faith Hubley
- Z górki by Marian Cholerek

== Parallel sections ==
=== International Critics' Week ===
The following feature films were screened for the 19th International Critics' Week (19e Semaine de la Critique):

- Adrien's Story by Jean-Pierre Denis
- Babylon by Franco Rosso
- Best Boy by Ira Wohl
- Immacolata and Concetta: The Other Jealousy by Salvatore Piscicelli
- Provincial Actors by Agnieszka Holland
- The Nineteen Year-Old's Map by Mitsuo Yanagimachi
- Ticket of No Return by Ulrike Ottinger

=== Directors' Fortnight ===
The following films were screened for the 1980 Directors' Fortnight (Quinzaine des Réalizateurs):

- Afternoon of War by Karl Francis
- Aziza by Abdellatif Ben Ammar
- The Blood Of Hussain by Jamil Dehlavi
- Carny by Robert Kaylor
- Gaijin: Roads to Freedom by Tizuka Yamasaki
- Gal Young Un by Victor Nuñez
- The Handyman by Micheline Lanctôt
- Hazal by Ali Ozgentürk
- Morning Undersea by Lauro Antonio
- Manoa by Solveig Hoogesteijn
- Mater Amatisima by José A. Salgot
- Oggetti Smarriti by Giuseppe Bertolucci
- Opname by Erik van Zuylen and Marja Kok
- Order by Sohrab Shahid Saless
- The Patriotic Woman by Alexander Kluge
- Pełnia by Andrzej Kondratiuk
- Prostitute by Tony Garnett
- Radio On by Christopher Petit
- Purity of Heart by Robert van Ackeren
- Sunday Children by Michael Verhoeven
- Sunday Daughters by János Rózsa
- Union City by Marcus Reichert

Short films

- Noticiero Incine by Frank Pineda and Ramiro Lacayo
- Ovtcharsko by Christo Kovatchev
- Vietnam, voyage dans le temps by Edgar Telles Ribeiro

== Official Awards ==
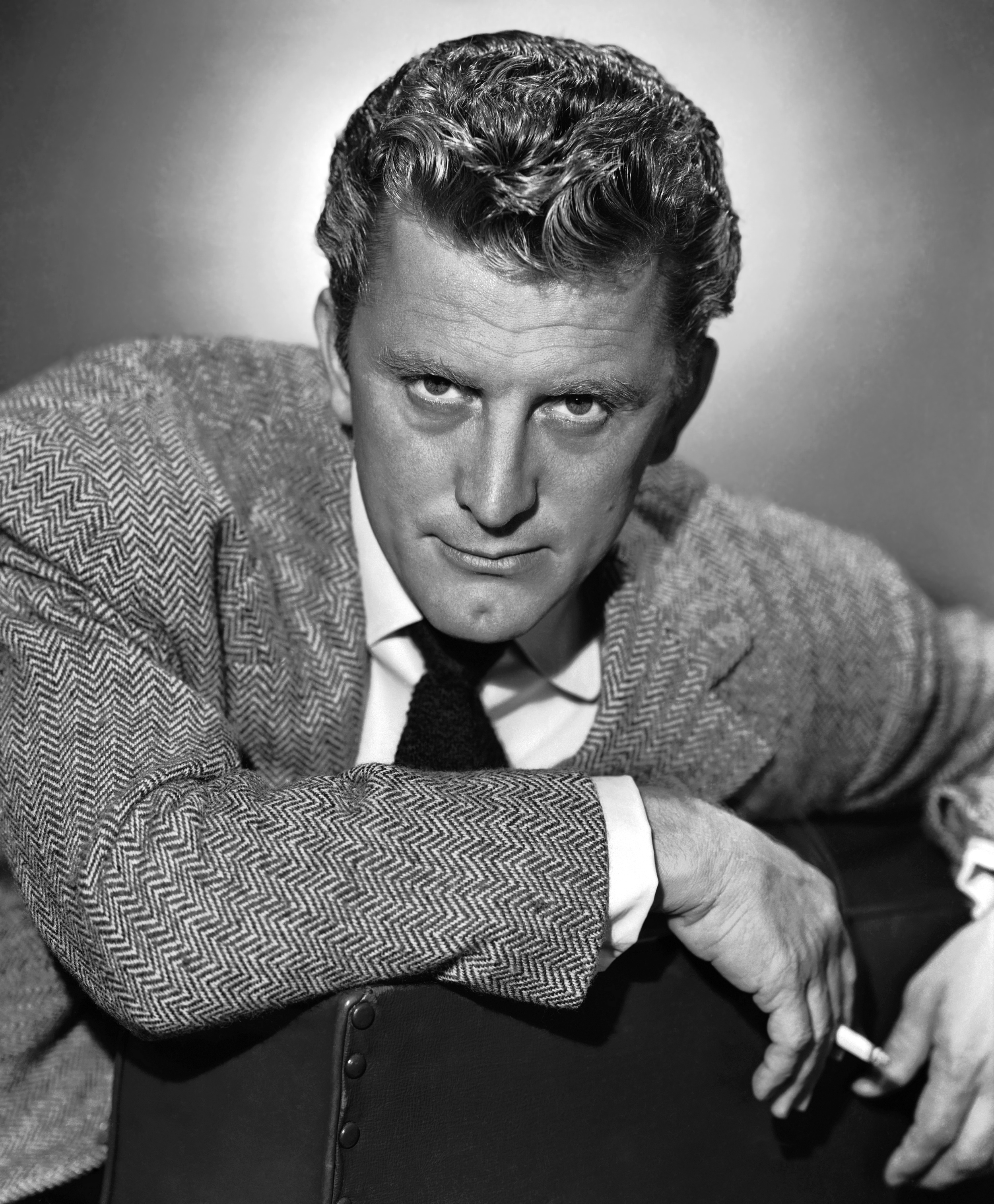
Kirk Douglas, Jury President

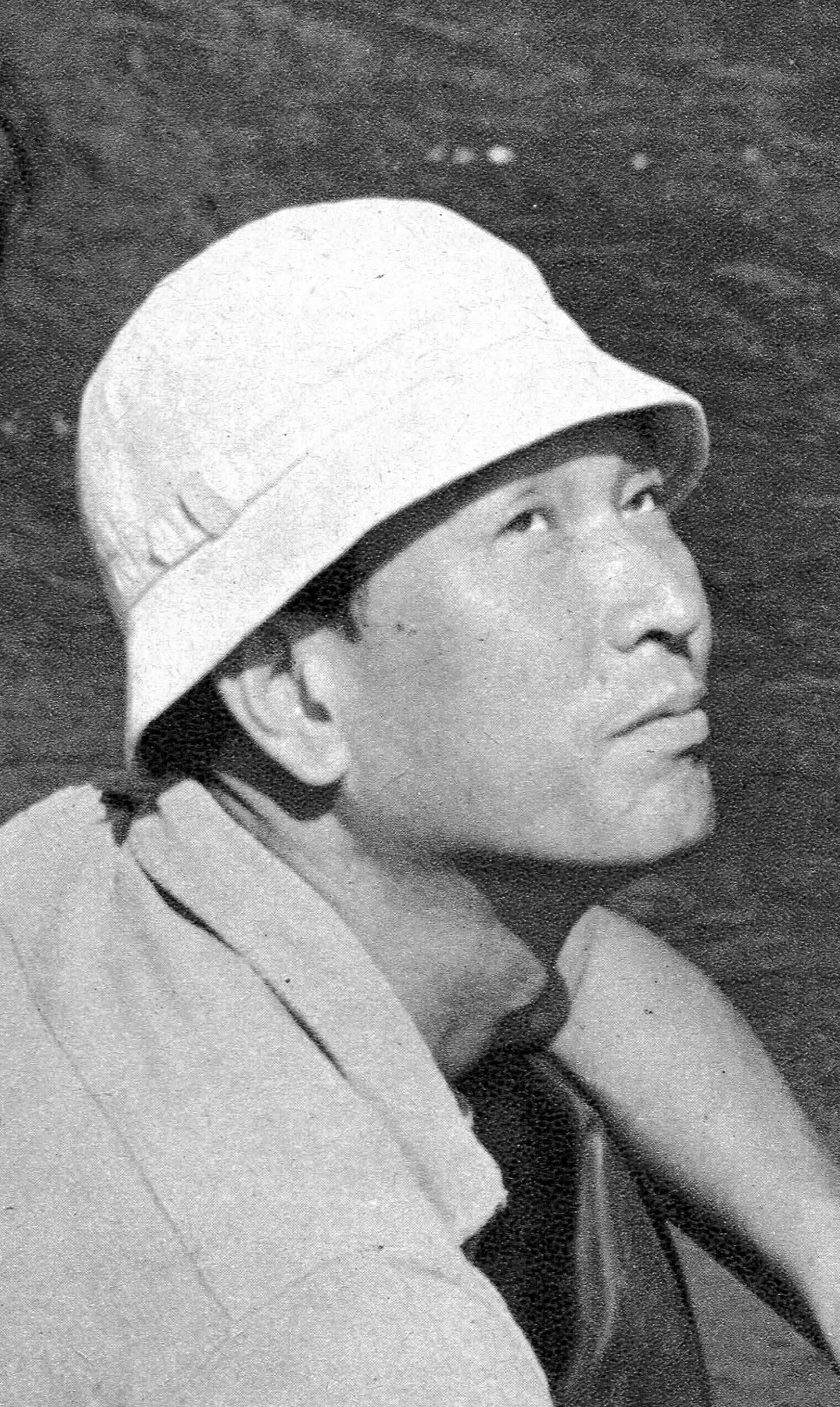
Akira Kurosawa, Palme d'Or winner

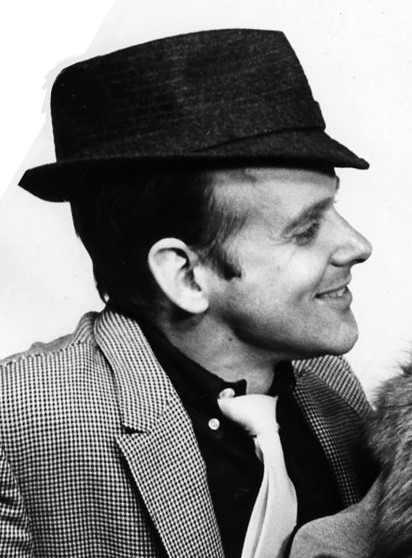
Bob Fosse, Palme d'Or winner

=== In Competition ===
- Palme d'Or:
  - All That Jazz by Bob Fosse
  - Kagemusha by Akira Kurosawa
- Grand Prix: My American Uncle by Alain Resnais (unanimously)
- Best Screenplay: Ettore Scola, Agenore Incrocci and Furio Scarpelli for La terrazza
- Best Actress: Anouk Aimée for A Leap in the Dark
- Best Actor: Michel Piccoli for A Leap in the Dark
- Best Supporting Actress: Milena Dravić for Special Treatment & Carla Gravina for La terrazza
- Best Supporting Actor: Jack Thompson for Breaker Morant
- Jury Prize: The Constant Factor by Krzysztof Zanussi

=== Caméra d'Or ===
- Adrien's Story by Jean-Pierre Denis

=== Short Film Palme d'Or ===
- Seaside Woman by Oscar Grillo
- Jury Prize: Canada Vignettes: The Performer by Norma Bailey & Krychle by Zdenek Smetana

== Independent Awards ==
=== FIPRESCI Prizes ===
- My American Uncle by Alain Resnais (In competition)
- Provincial Actors by Agnieszka Holland (International Critics' Week)
- Gaijin: Roads to Freedom by Tizuka Yamasaki (Directors' Fortnight)

=== Commission Supérieure Technique ===
- Technical Grand Prize: Le Risque de vivre by Gérald Calderon (out of competition)

=== Prize of the Ecumenical Jury ===
- The Constant Factor by Krzysztof Zanussi

== Media ==
- INA: Joint Palme d'Or to Akira Kurosawa and Bob Fosse (Dirk Bogarde and Kirk Douglas present the Palme d'Or to Akira Kurosawa for "Kagemusha" and to Bob Fosse for "All That Jazz" - commentary in French)
- INA: Chronicle of the 1980 Festival (commentary in French)
