= Lilicub =

French band

- Origin: France
- Genres: Pop
- Occupation: Singers
- Years active: 1992-2009
- Members: Catherine Dirand; Benoît Carré; Philippe Zavriew

Lilicub was a French band that was founded in 1992, mainly known for its 1996 hit "Voyage en Italie".

== Biography ==
The group was originally a trio composed of Catherine Dirand, Benoît Carré (actress Isabelle Carré's brother) and Philippe Zavriew. Benoît met Catherine at a jazz festival in Ampthill. In late 1993, they signed with the label Remark and released their first single, entitled Au bout du compte, in early 1995. Their second single, "Voyage in Italie", ensured their reputation, reaching #7 on the French SNEP Top 50 during the summer of 1996.

Lilicub was nominated at the 1997 Victoires de la Musique in the category "Revelation of the year", and awarded the Sacem Roger Seiller award for "Best French Group" in 1998. The same year, Lilicub released its second album, La Grande Vacance. The group then engaged in collaborations with Japanese artists like Taeko Onuki and Noriko Kato. Their third album, Zoom, was produced as a film and released in 2001. In 2005, the band toured across France to promote its new songs.

The group broke up in 2009.

== Discography ==
=== Albums ===
- 1996 : Voyage en Italie
- 1997 : A Tribute to Antônio Carlos Jobim
- 1998 : La Grande Vacance
- 1999 : La Douce Vie
- 2000 : À la Nouvelle Vague
- 2001 : Tribute to Polnareff
- 2001 : Zoom
- 2002 : Boby Tutti-Frutti - L'hommage délicieux à Boby Lapointe
- 2003 : L'Humeur vagabonde : hommage à Jeanne Moreau
- 2008 : Papa a fait Mai 68

=== Singles ===
- 1996 : "Voyage en Italie" - #7 in France
- 1996 : "Faire fi de tout" - #30 in France
