= Thierry la Fronde =

French television series (1963-66)

Thierry la Fronde (Terry the Sling) is a French television series that aired from 1963 to 1966 on the television station, ORTF. The original script was by Jean-Claude Deret.

Dubbed into English, the series was shown internationally in the 1960s, including Canada and Australia, where it was referred to under the original name, and also as The King's Outlaw. It was shown as well in Poland as Thierry Śmiałek (Thierry the Daredevil). On ABC in Australia, it was called The King's Outlaw. In the Netherlands, 32 of the 52 episodes were shown in 1967 as Thierry de Slingeraar (Thierry the Sling), as a Netherlands Television Service programme.

== Synopsis ==
In 1356, during the Hundred Years' War, France is occupied by the English, and the Black Prince rules France with an iron fist. In Sologne in the heart of France, Thierry of Janville, a young lord, fights gallantly against the English occupation but is betrayed by his steward, Florent, and loses his title and his lands. He then takes the name of "Thierry La Fronde", and with the help of his faithful companions continues his fight undercover.

This preceded each episode on the Australian version. Early in the 14th century France and England were locked in a long war. The French King had been captured by the Prince of Wales The black prince and the Dauphin Charles leading the French fought on against the English on one side and his rebel cousin Charles of Navarre on the other During the sojourn The Loyal duke of jombere was forced to become an outlaw With his favorite weapon the fronde or sling he became the legendary hero Thierry La Fronde The kings outlaw

== Actors ==
- Jean-Claude Drouot: Thierry of Janville, known as "Thierry La Fronde"
- Céline Léger: Isabelle
- Jean Gras: Bertrand
- Robert Bazil: Boucicault
- Robert Rollis: Jehan
- Clément Michu: Martin
- Jean-Claude Deret: Florent
- Bernard Rousselet: Pierre
- Fernand Bellan: Judas
- Gamil Rateb

== Production ==
The programme theme music was a simple tune in the Dorian mode composed by Jacques Loussier, and performed on a brass instrument (possibly a French horn) for the melody.

A co-production of Téléfrance and RTF, 52 episodes of 26 minutes each were produced in black and white (November 1963 to March 1966), and first broadcast in 1963.

== Reception ==
The series was created to compete with the overwhelming British and U.S. film productions with mediaeval themes and became one of the most popular programmes on French television in the 1960s. It is credited with boosting the use of the sling shot in French school playgrounds and turning the relatively rare first name, Thierry, into one of the most popular names for French boys.

In 1964 Lucien Nortier drew a comic strip adaptation, published in Le Journal de Mickey. In October 2012, it was announced that a modern version of the programme was in production.

== See also ==
- Château-Thierry
