= No et moi =

- Film poster
- Directed by: Zabou Breitman
- Written by: Zabou Breitman; Agnès de Sacy
- Based on: No et moi by Delphine de Vigan
- Produced by: Gilles Legrand; Frédéric Brillion
- Starring: Julie-Marie Parmentier; Nina Rodriguez; Antonin Chalon; Bernard Campan; Zabou Breitman
- Cinematography: Michel Amathieu
- Edited by: Françoise Bernard
- Production companies: Epithète Films; France 3 Cinéma
- Distributed by: Diaphana Films
- Release date: 17 November 2010
- Running time: 105 minutes
- Country: France
- Language: French
- Budget: $5.1 million
- Box office: $1.4 million

No et moi (lit. 'No and me') is a 2010 French drama film directed and co-written by Zabou Breitman. It is based on the Prix des Libraires-winning novel of the same name by Delphine de Vigan.

== Cast ==
- Julie-Marie Parmentier as Nora ("No")
- Nina Rodriguez as Lou Bertignac
- Antonin Chalon as Lucas
- Bernard Campan as Lou's father
- Zabou Breitman as Lou's mother
- Grégoire Bonnet as Monsieur Vargas
- Guilaine Londez as Sylvie
- Eric Valero as Éric
