= Jean-Pierre Denis =

French film director

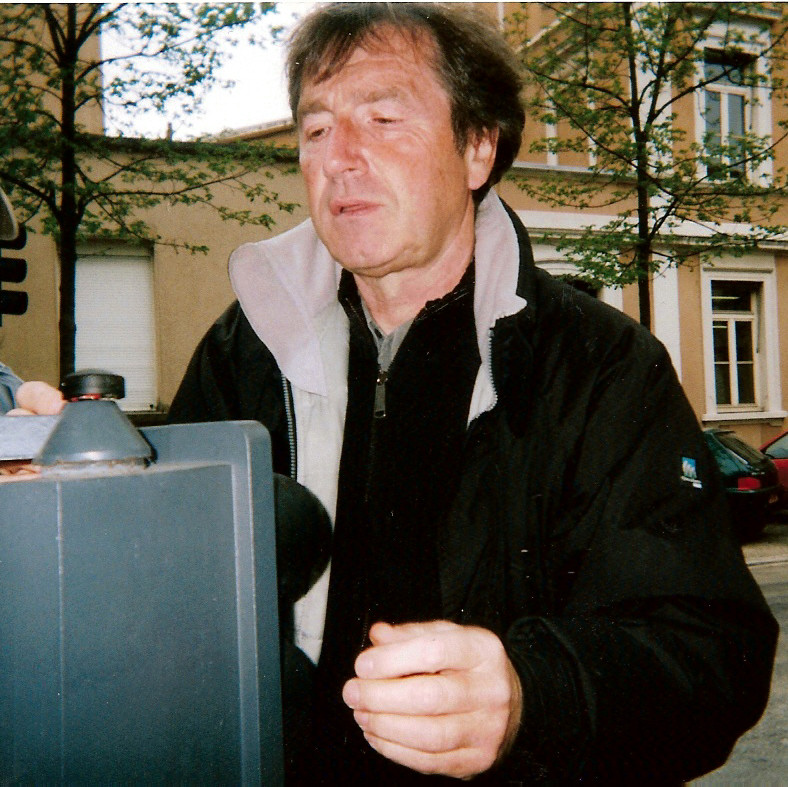
- Born: 29 March 1946 (age 80); Saint-Léon-sur-l'Isle, France
- Occupations: Film director Screenwriter
- Years active: 1980–present

Jean-Pierre Denis (French pronunciation: [ʒɑ̃ pjɛʁ dəni]; born 29 March 1946) is a French film director and screenwriter. He has directed seven films since 1980. His directorial debut Adrien's Story won the Caméra d'Or at the 1980 Cannes Film Festival. His film Field of Honor was entered into the 1987 Cannes Film Festival.

== Filmography ==
- Adrien's Story (1980)
- La palombière (1983)
- Champ d'honneur (1987)
- Les yeux de Cécile (1993)
- Les blessures assassines (2000)
- La petite Chartreuse (2005)
- Ici-bas (2011)
