= Denys Granier-Deferre =

French film director (born 1949)

Denys Granier-Deferre (born 27 December 1949) is a French film director.

== Biography ==
Granier-Deferre was born in Boulogne-Billancourt, Paris, France, and is the son of Pierre Granier-Deferre with whom he started cinema as his assistant, notably on his father's movie Le Chat (1971). He then worked with different French directors before writing and filming his first movie, Que les gros salaires lèvent le doigt!, in 1982.

== Filmography ==
As director and writer

- 1982 : Que les gros salaires lèvent le doigt!
- 1984 : Réveillon chez Bob
- 2010 : Pièce montée
