= Zabou Breitman =

French actress and film director

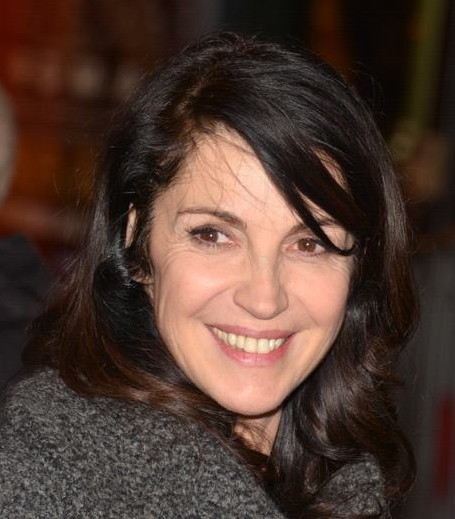
- Breitman in 2015
- Born: Isabelle Breitman; 30 October 1959 (age 66); Paris, France
- Occupations: Actress, director, screenwriter
- Years active: 1964–present

Zabou Breitman (born Isabelle Breitman; 30 October 1959), or simply Zabou, is a French actress and director. She is the daughter of actors Jean-Claude Deret and Céline Léger. At the age of four, she appeared in her first movie. Since 1981, Zabou has acted in dozens of roles in films, TV movies, and theater. She made her directoral debut in 2001 with Se souvenir des belles choses, for which she won a César Award for Best Debut. In 2012, she participated in Rendez-vous en terre inconnue.

In 2000 she took the role of Lucille Cadeau, a French actress, in the London premiere of Ayckbourn's House & Garden at the National Theatre in London.

== Personal life ==
Zabou has two children with the sculptor Fabien Chalon: Anna (1990) and Antonin (1993).

== Filmography ==
=== Actress ===
Year	Title	Role	Director	Notes
1964	Thierry la Fronde	The little girl	Robert Guez	TV series (1 episode)
1982	Elle voit des nains partout!	Snow White	Jean-Claude Sussfeld	
1982	La Boum 2	Catherine	Claude Pinoteau	
1982	Eden		Robert Réa	Short
1983	Le petit théâtre d'Antenne 2		Philippe Ronce	TV series (1 episode)
1983	Banzaï	Sophia	Claude Zidi	
1983	Vichy dancing	Gaby	Léonard Keigel	TV movie
1983	Le lavabo		Patrick Bouchitey	TV Mini-Series
1984	The Perils of Gwendoline in the Land of the Yik-Yak	Beth	Just Jaeckin	
1985	Le diamant de Salisbury	Frédérique	Christiane Spiero	TV movie
1985	Une Femme ou Deux	Constance Michaux	Daniel Vigne	
1985	Billy Ze Kick	Juliette Chapeau	Gérard Mordillat	Nominated - César Award for Most Promising Actress
1986	Suivez mon regard	The handicap	Jean Curtelin	
1986	États d'âme	Helene	Jacques Fansten	
1986	Le complexe du kangourou	Odile	Pierre Jolivet	
1987	Le beauf	Maryline	Yves Amoureux	
1987	Fucking Fernand	A prostitute	Gérard Mordillat (2)	
1987	Dandin	Angélique	Roger Planchon	
1988	Sueurs froides	Fanny	Pierre Jolivet (2)	TV series (1 episode)
1988	La travestie	Nicole Armingault	Yves Boisset	
1989	Les cigognes n'en font qu'à leur tête	Hélène Parnet	Didier Kaminka	
1989	Moitié-moitié	Sarah	Paul Boujenah	
1989	Mon dernier rêve sera pour vous	Hortense Albert	Robert Mazoyer	TV Mini-Series
1989	À corps et à cris	Marie Parenty	Josée Dayan	TV movie
1990	La Baule-les-Pins	Bella	Diane Kurys	
1990	Le Gorille	Magda	Denys Granier-Deferre	TV series (1 episode)
1990	Promotion canapé	Carole	Didier Kaminka (2)	
1990	La vie privée des animaux		Patrick Bouchitey (2)	TV series
1991	Les secrets professionnels du Dr Apfelglück	Carole Ribéra	Alessandro Capone, Stéphane Clavier, Thierry Lhermitte, ...	
1991	Une époque formidable...	The Interviewer	Gérard Jugnot	
1991	Toujours seuls	Isabelle	Gérard Mordillat (3)	
1991	Crimes et jardins	Viviane	Jean-Paul Salomé	TV movie
1991	Blanval	Emma	Michel Mees	
1992	588 rue paradis	Astrid Sétian	Henri Verneuil	
1992	Juste avant l'orage	Mathilde	Bruno Herbulot	
1992	La Crise	Isa Barelle	Coline Serreau	Nominated - César Award for Best Supporting Actress
1992	Les taupes-niveaux	Claire	Jean-Luc Trotignon	TV movie
1993	Cuisine et dépendances	Martine	Philippe Muyl	
1993	Mayrig	Astrig Sétian	Henri Verneuil (2)	TV Mini-Series
1994	Regards d'enfance	Mathilde	Jean-Paul Salomé (2)	TV series (1 episode)
1995	Charlotte et Léa	Léa	Jean-Claude Sussfeld (2)	TV movie
1996	Antoine	Diane	Jérôme Foulon	TV movie
1996	Chassés-croisés	Nina	Denys Granier-Deferre (2)	TV movie
1997	Tenue correcte exigée	Catherine Sperry	Philippe Lioret	
1997	L'Homme idéal	Madeleine	Xavier Gélin	
1997	Famille nombreuse		Jean-Marc Longval	Short
1998	Bébés boum	Agnès	Marc Angelo	TV movie
1998	Ça reste entre nous	Marie	Martin Lamotte	
1999	Le double de ma moitié	Cécile / Suzy	Yves Amoureux (2)	
1999	Les duettistes: Une dette mortelle	Lisa Le Guirec	Alain Tasma	TV movie Festival du Film Policier de Cognac - Grand Prix Téléfilm - Special Mention
1999	My Little Business	Nathalie	Pierre Jolivet (3)	
1999	Du bleu jusqu'en Amérique	Anna	Sarah Lévy	
1999	Les duettistes: Lisa et Simon	Lisa Le Guirec	Marc Angelo (2), Alain Tasma (2)	TV movie
2001	L'inconnue du Val-Perdu	Martine	Serge Meynard	TV movie
2001	Les duettistes: Jeunes proies	Lisa Le Guirec	Marc Angelo (3)	TV movie
2001	Rastignac ou les ambitieux	Diane Langeais	Alain Tasma (3)	TV Mini-Series
2001	Beautiful Memories	Marie Bjorg	Zabou Breitman	
2001	Les duettistes: Le môme	Lisa Le Guirrec	Denys Granier-Deferre (3)	TV movie
2001	Bécassine - Le trésor viking	Loulotte	Philippe Vidal	
2002	Almost Peaceful	Léa	Michel Deville	
2002	À l'abri des regards indiscrets	Player	Ruben Alves, Hugo Gélin	Short
2004	Narco	Paméla	Tristan Aurouet, Gilles Lellouche	
2005	The Perfume of the Lady in Black	Edith Rance	Bruno Podalydès	
2007	Vérités assassines	Véra Cabral	Arnaud Sélignac	TV movie
2008	Les insoumis	Commissioner Vasseur	Claude-Michel Rome	
2008	The First Day of the Rest of Your Life	Marie-Jeanne Duval	Rémi Bezançon	
2008	The Crimson Wing: Mystery of the Flamingos	Narrator (French version)	Matthew Aeberhard, Leander Ward	
2009	Rien de personnel	Christine Barbieri	Mathias Gokalp	
2010	Deli dumrul kurtlar kuslar aleminde	Artist Sami	Oguz Yalçin	
2010	Notre Dame des Barjots	Véra Cabral	Arnaud Sélignac (2)	TV movie
2010	No et moi	Lou's mother	Zabou Breitman (2)	
2011	Titeuf	Mother	Zep	
2011	The Minister	Pauline	Pierre Schoeller	Nominated - César Award for Best Supporting Actress
2012	Pieces of Me	Christine	Nolwenn Lemesle	
2012	Amitiés sincères	Stéphanie	Stéphan Archinard, François Prévôt-Leygonie	
2012	On the Other Side of the Tracks	Commissioner Morland	David Charhon	
2013	Le grand méchant loup	Victoire Delcroix	Nicolas Charlet, Bruno Lavaine	
2013	Fais pas ci, fais pas ça	Eve de Colbert	Cathy Verney, Laurent Dussaux, Jérôme Navarro	TV series (5 episodes)
2014	Belle comme la femme d'un autre	Clémence Garnier	Catherine Castel	
2014	24 Days	Ruth Halimi	Alexandre Arcady	
2015	Discount	Sofia Benhaoui	Louis-Julien Petit	
2015	Entre amis	Astrid	Olivier Baroux	
2015	All Three of Us	Mother	Kheiron	
2016	Baden Baden	Chantale	Rachel Lang	
2016	Arrête ton cinéma	Ingrid	Diane Kurys	
2017	Il a déjà tes yeux	Claire Mallet	Lucien Jean-Baptiste	
2017	The law of Pauline	Pauline	Philippe Venault	TV movie

=== Director ===
Year	Title	Notes
2001	Beautiful Memories	César Award for Best First Feature Film; French Syndicate of Cinema Critics - Best First Film; Étoiles d'Or - Best First Film
2003	Bien joué	Short
2003	Bien entendu	Short
2003	Bien dit	Short
2005	L'hiver sous la table	
2006	The Man of My Life	
2007	Dix films pour en parler	Short
2009	Someone I Loved	
2010	No et moi	
2019	The Swallows of Kabul	Animation film (co-directed with Eléa Gobbé-Mévellec)
