= Naked Tango =

1990 erotic drama film

- UK VHS sleeve
- Directed by: Leonard Schrader
- Written by: Leonard Schrader
- Produced by: David Weisman
- Starring: Vincent D'Onofrio; Mathilda May; Esai Morales
- Cinematography: Juan Ruiz Anchía
- Edited by: Debra McDermott
- Music by: Thomas Newman
- Production companies: Gotan; Grupo Baires; Jade M Praesens-Film; Sugarloaf Films Inc. Towa
- Distributed by: New Line Cinema (1991, USA); Toho-Towa Distribution (1991, Japan)
- Release dates: September 27, 1990 (West Germany); August 23, 1991 (United States)
- Running time: 90 minutes
- Countries: Argentina; Switzerland; Japan; United States
- Languages: English; Spanish
- Box office: $81,777

Naked Tango is a 1990 erotic drama film. An Argentine-international co-production, it was written and directed by Leonard Schrader, and stars Vincent D'Onofrio, Mathilda May, Esai Morales and Fernando Rey. The choreography was created by Carlos Rivarola.

== Synopsis ==
Returning by ship to Buenos Aires in the 1920s, a young woman escapes her elderly husband by swapping places with a woman committing suicide. She believes her new life will be that of an arranged marriage but finds it is in fact a ruse to cause her to work in a brothel. The film plays on the association of tango with brothels and clearly alludes to the practices of the Zwi Migdal white-slavery and prostitution ring that was active in Buenos Aires early in the twentieth century and was dissolved thanks to Raquel Liberman.

== Cast ==
- Vincent D'Onofrio as Cholo
- Mathilda May as Alba / Stephanie (Estefanía)
- Fernando Rey as Juez Torres
- Tony Payne as waiter
- Henry Holmes as passenger
- Anthony Pratt as boat captain
- Roberto Scheuer as immigration officer
- Esai Morales as Zico Borenstein
- Cipe Lincovsky as mother
- Josh Mostel as Jewellery man Bertoni
- Sergio Lerer as fake rabbi
- Patricio Bisso as Gastón the hairdresser
- Constance McCashin as Flora
- Vando Villamil as cop
- Javier Portales as chief inspector of police
- Marcos Woinski
- Rubén Szuchmacher
- Néstor Zacco as cop
- Inés Yujnovsky as Bebe
- Harry Havilio as doctor
- Kerry Warn
- Anne Henry as maid
- Bill James as butler
- Armando Capó as guard
- Claudio Garófalo as musician
- Héctor Arbelo
- Santos Maggi
- Jorge Sabaté
- Guillermina Quiroga as woman at the cabaret
- Grecia Levy

== Awards ==
The film was nominated for the Critics' Prize at the 1991 Deauville Film Festival.
