= Robert Fraisse (cinematographer) =

French cinematographer

- Born: 1940 (age 85–86); Paris, France
- Years active: 1962–2016

Robert Fraisse (French: [ʁɔbɛʁ fʁɛs]; born 1940) is a French cinematographer.

== Filmography ==
=== Film ===
Year	Title	Director
1973	Un homme libre	Roberto Muller
1974	Moi je veux voir la mer...	Christian-Paul Arrighi
1975	Story of O (Note: Shared credit with Yves Rodallec)	Just Jaeckin
1975	Emmanuelle 2	Francis Giacobetti
1977	The French Woman	Just Jaeckin
1978	Le Dernier Amant romantique	Just Jaeckin
1978	One Two Two	Christian Gion
1981	Asphale	Denis Amar
1981	Lady Chatterley's Lover	Just Jaeckin
1982	Ma femme s'appelle reviens	Patrice Leconte
1983	Circulez y'a rien à voir	Patrice Leconte
1984	L'Addition	Denis Amar
1984	The Twin	Yves Robert
1985	Le téléphone sonne toujours deux fois!!	Jean-Pierre Vergne
1986	La Gitane	Philippe de Broca
1986	Le Débutant	Daniel Janneau; Francis Perrin
1986	Cours privé	Pierre Granier-Deferre
1987	Châteauroux district	Philippe Charigot
1987	Spiral	Christopher Frank
1988	La Passerelle	Jean-Claude Sussfeld
1988	Door on the Left as You Leave the Elevator	Édouard Molinaro
1992	The Lover	Jean-Jacques Annaud
1993	Un crime	Jacques Deray
1995	Wings of Courage	Jean-Jacques Annaud
1996	Fantôme avec chauffeur	Gérard Oury
1997	Keys to Tulsa	Leslie Greif
1997	Seven Years in Tibet	Jean-Jacques Annaud
1998	Ronin	John Frankenheimer
1999	Season's Beatings	Danièle Thompson
2000	Vatel	Roland Joffé
2001	Enemy at the Gates	Jean-Jacques Annaud
2003	Tempo	Eric Styles
2003	Luther	Eric Till
2004	The Notebook	Nick Cassavetes
2004	Hotel Rwanda	Terry George
2006	Alpha Dog	Nick Cassavetes
2006	The Valet	Francis Veber
2007	Goodbye Bafana	Bille August
2008	L'Emmerdeur	Francis Veber
2012	The Chef	Daniel Cohen
2013	Girl on a Bicycle	Jeremy Leven
2014	The Other Woman	Nick Cassavetes

=== Television ===
TV movies

Year	Title	Director
1992	Strangers	Don McBrearty; Joan Tewkesbury; Daniel Vigne; Wayne Wang
1995	Citizen X	Chris Gerolmo

TV series

Year	Title	Director	Notes
2011	Le vernis craque	Daniel Janneau	2 episodes
2011	La collection - Écrire pour... 5 fois Nathalie Baye	Jean-Luc Perréard	Episode "Dormir debout"

== Awards and nominations ==
Year	Award	Category	Title	Result
1992	Academy Awards	Best Cinematography	The Lover	Nominated
2001	British Society of Cinematographers	Best Cinematography	Enemy at the Gates	Nominated
1995	CableACE Award	Cinematography in a Movie or Miniseries	Citizen X	Nominated
2000	Camerimage	Silver Frog	Vatel	Won
2000	Camerimage	Golden Frog	Vatel	Won
1993	César Awards	Best Cinematography	The Lover	Nominated
