= Zwi Migdal =

Polish Jewish human trafficking organization operating in Argentina

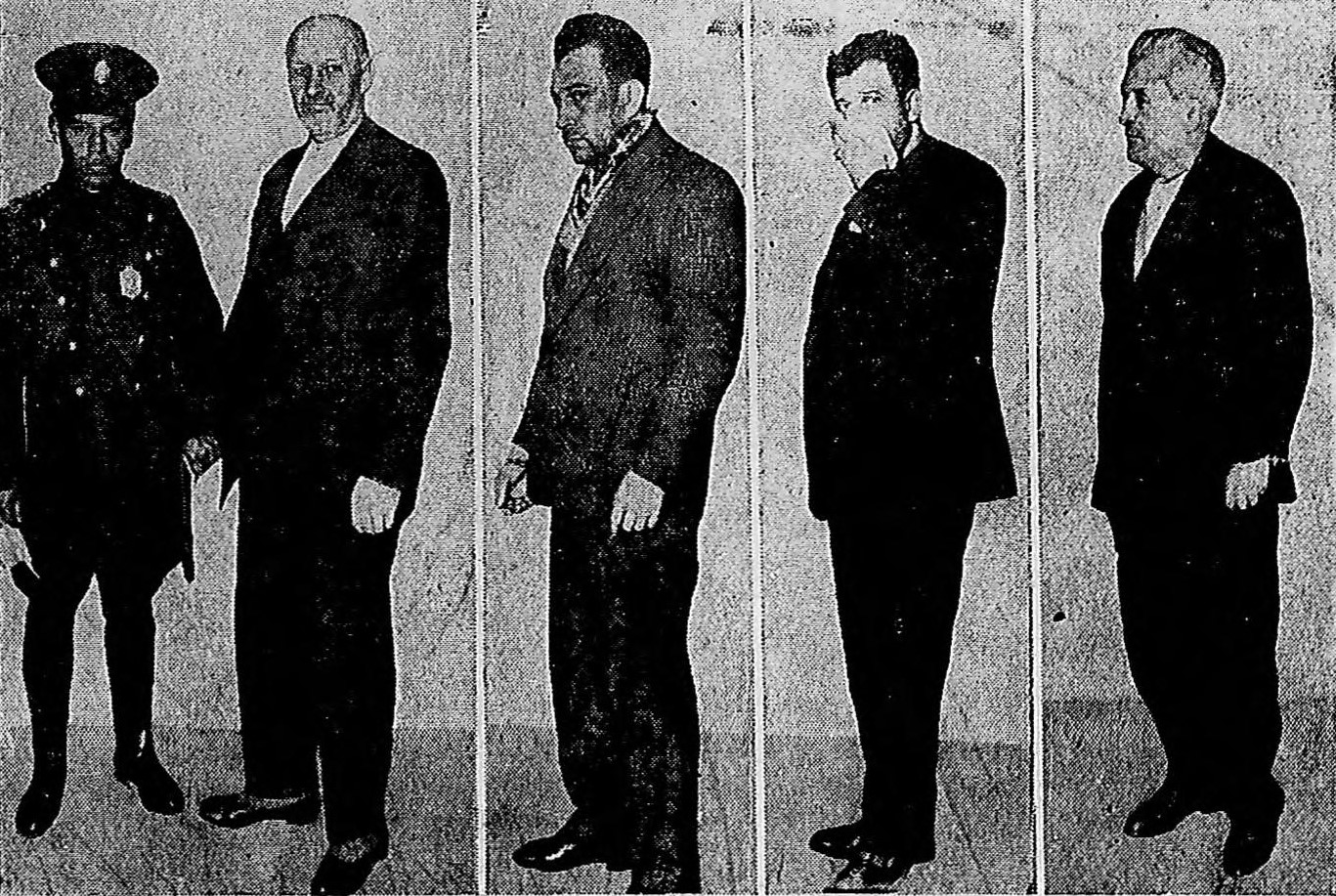
- Named after: Luis Zwi Migdal
- Years active: 1867–1939
- Territory: Argentina, Brazil, Poland, South Africa, United States
- Ethnicity: Jewish
- Membership: 1,000+
- Activities: human trafficking, pimping
- Allies: Jewish Mob, Ashkenazum

Zwi Migdal (Yiddish: צבי מגדל, IPA: [ˈtsvɪ mɪɡˈdal] Polish: Cwi Migdał) was a criminal organisation founded by Jews in Poland in the 19th century, based mainly in Argentina.

== History ==
The group's main operation was the trafficking of women from Central Europe (mainly from Warsaw) into sexual slavery and forced prostitution. The organization, whose operators were Jewish, functioned from its foundation in the 1860s until 1939.

The organisation's annual turnover was $50 million at the turn of the 20th century (approx. $2 billion today). After the First World War, it had 400 members in Argentina, Buenos Aires being its main centre of operations. It had branch offices in Brazil (Rio de Janeiro, São Paulo and Santos), the United States (New York City), Poland (Warsaw), South Africa, India and China.

During the 1920s the organisation grew to its largest-ever size. At its height, 430 individuals, acting as pimps and in other criminal roles, oversaw a network of 2,000 brothels and approximately 4,000 women in Argentina alone.

== Origin of the name ==
The organization's founders having originated from Warsaw, the group was legally registered as the Varsovia Jewish Mutual Aid Society, to facilitate operations ("Varsovia" is the Spanish name for Warsaw). In 1927, after the Polish envoy to Argentina filed an official complaint regarding the organization's use of the city "Warsaw" in the name, the group was renamed "Zwi Migdal" in honour of Luis Zvi Migdal, one of its founders. The name is rendered in Polish as "Cwi Migdał".

== Modus operandi ==
The organization lured girls and young women from Europe in several ways. Pindel describes one ruse in which a well-mannered and elegant-looking man would appear in a poor Jewish village in Poland or Russia. He would advertise his search for young women to work in the homes of wealthy Jews in Argentina by posting an advertisement in the local synagogue. Fearful of pogroms and often in desperate economic circumstances, parents would send their daughters away with the man, hoping that this might offer them a fresh start.

Another popular ruse was to find pretty girls and marry them, usually in a quick wedding ceremony known in Yiddish as a "shtille chupah". The girls bade their families farewell and boarded ships to Argentina, believing that they were on their way toward a better future. The rape of the girls and abuse as sex slaves often started on the ship. Some of them were married off to local men so that they could obtain entry visas.

Prostitutes who failed to satisfy their clients were beaten, fined, or sent to work in rural houses. Every business transaction was logged. The ruffians held a "meat market" where newly arrived girls were paraded naked in front of traders in places such as Hotel Palestina and Cafe Parisienne. These activities went on undisrupted because government officials, judges, and journalists frequented the brothels. City officials, politicians, and police officers were bribed. The pimps had powerful connections everywhere. The largest brothels in Buenos Aires housed as many as 60 to 80 sex slaves. Although there were brothels all over Argentina, most were in Buenos Aires, in the Jewish quarter on Junin Street.

== Influence of the organization ==
The organization had arms in several countries and was a controversial presence in South America's Jewish community. It was a supporter of Yiddish theatre in Brazil but was attacked by Jews in Rio de Janeiro for presenting Torah scrolls. A significant number of Jews who had come to Brazil did so as families and viewed prostitution as immoral and "impure" influences. Zwi Migdal's attempt to relocate to Rio, after events in Buenos Aires (discussed below), caused an increased battle against the group among Brazilian Jews.

In Argentina, the group's activities were at times used to bolster antisemitism, a use that also occurred in Brazil, where the Jewish community also often opposed the organization. More specifically the group was cited in relation to negative views of Eastern European Jews, who were at times seen as more prone to criminality and/or political radicalism within Argentinian society, as opposed to German Jews. The Chilean Nicolás Palacios used their crimes in claims Jews "dominated" Argentina's women and were "polluting" that nation.

== Splinter groups ==
Zwi Migdal later split and a splinter group led by Simon Rubinstein established its own society named Ashkenazum. Once officially recognized, both associations bought plots of land on the outskirts of Buenos Aires and established their own cemeteries there.

== Downfall ==
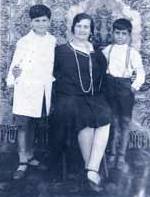
Raquel Liberman in the 1930s.

The organization worked to force Raquel Liberman, a former prostitute, to return to prostitution. Liberman had emigrated to Argentina after her husband, who died a year after her arrival, leaving her with two small sons. To support them she worked as a prostitute, until saving enough money to open an antique shop, which was later raided by local pimps who robbed her of her savings and forced her back into prostitution. There Liberman contacted the police superintendent, Julio Alsogaray, whom she had heard would not accept bribes from Zwi Migdal, and was looking for ways to destroy the organization. Slipping into his office one day, she gave detailed testimony on the workings of Zwi Migdal, thus enabling the police to launch an extensive investigation. The case was handled by an investigative judge, Rodriguez Ocampo, who also refused to be bribed. The lengthy trial ended in September 1930, with 108 criminal convictions. "The very existence of the Zwi Migdal Organization directly threatens our society," wrote Ocampo in his verdict, handing down long prison sentences. The pimps appealed their sentences from prison in January 1931, and senior Justice Ministry officials released all but three of them. After this was reported in the media, public outrage convinced the authorities to rescind the releases. Later, hundreds of pimps were deported to Uruguay, but slowly returned over the years.

== Zwi Migdal in Brazil ==
The first boatload of young Jewish women arrived in Brazil in 1867. In 1872, the Imperial Brazilian government extradited some Jewish pimps and prostitutes, but the criminal activities continued. In Rio de Janeiro the brothels were concentrated in a few streets near downtown, in the Mangue neighborhood, a city zone where prostitution was segregated and legally authorized. As most of the prostitutes came from Poland, they were called "polacas" ("Polish women") and this word acquired a scornful meaning in Brazilian Portuguese language. By 1913, there were 431 brothels controlled by the Zwi Migdal in Rio de Janeiro.

The prostitutes, largely illiterate, poor, and despised by the mainstream Jewish community, banded together to form their own self benevolent societies. In 1906 they formed in Rio de Janeiro their own Chesed Shel Emes - חסד של אמת (lit. Society of True Charity), formally registered as "Associação Beneficente Funerária e Religiosa Israelita" – ABFRI (Jewish Benevolent Association for Burial and Religion). This organization was created and run by women exploited by Zwi Migdal and other Jewish crime syndicates, but had no connection with criminal activities.

That social and religious organization was created and managed mainly by the Polish-Jewish prostitutes ("polacas") exploited by Jewish crime syndicates. Their main goals, they wrote in the founding charter, were: "to set up a synagogue, and there practice all the ceremonies of the Jewish religion; to grant sick members in need of treatment outside the city a third-class train ticket and three pounds sterling; to grant members a third-class funeral."

Using their association savings, they purchased real-state properties and founded their own cemetery in 1916 and their own synagogue in 1942. In its heyday, several Brazilian cities had their own Chesed Shel Emes associations and several rabbis, all since deceased, were employed by the communities. Rio de Janeiro's Chesed Shel Emes association was the largest one. It was led by one of their own elected freely and called "Irmã Superiora" ("superior sister"), who worn a large blue ribbon across her chest during reunions and feasts.

The Buenos Aires police enforcement, led by Julio Alsogaray, dealt a heavy blow to Jewish crime syndicates that affected their activities even in Brazil. The destruction of the Jewish communities in Eastern Europe during World War II eliminated the last links between South American and European Jewish crime syndicates. After 1939, the Jewish women traffic ceased, but Jewish women could still be found in the Brazilian prostitution zones until the end of the 1950s.

Rio de Janeiro's Chesed Shel Emes had four "Irmãs Superioras" ("superior sisters"); the last one was Rebeca Freedman, also known as Rebeka Fridman or "dona Beka" (Ms. Beka). The other women used to refer to her as their queen. Although born in Poland, she came to Brazil around 1916 from the United States when she was about 35 years old. Certainly she followed some connections between New York and Rio de Janeiro crime syndicates. Deeply religious, she made her mission to perform the sacred tahara ceremony of washing the dead and provide a proper Jewish burial for all her "sisters". She died in 1984 at the age of 103.

The Jewish women benevolent organizations ceased to exist when all their members died, married, or moved to other cities. As no new members joined, the number of "sisters" dwindled and their association assets were eventually donated to or purchased by the "respectable" Jewish associations. As part of the bargain, some women were accepted in their final days in Jewish rest homes for elderly people, but many of them died in deep poverty in public rest homes with beggars. Some of them married Jews or non-Jewish men and were absorbed by "respectable" Brazilian society. Most of the reluctance to speak about the history of Zwi Migdal can be attributed to the fact that the prostitutes' descendants are today living a very comfortable and prominent life.

=== Legacy ===
The cemeteries created by the Jewish prostitutes associations were the starting point in the recognition and interest in those women's history. They are being restored and preserved by members of the Brazilian Jewish community despite the heavy opposition of other members who feel uneasy or ashamed about the past of their friends, fellows or ancestors. In Cubatão City, São Paulo State, there is a Jewish cemetery that was recently restored. In São Paulo City, due to municipal ordinances, almost all the Jewish women's tombs were removed in 1971 from their original place in Chora-Menino Cemetery to anonymous tombs close to the walls of the Butantã Jewish Cemetery. Recently, some members of the Jewish community respectfully engraved on each tombstone the name of each woman there buried. In Rio de Janeiro, the Chesed Shel Emes' Cemetery, located close to the Inhaúma Cemetery, with almost 800 tombs, is abandoned, but some social organizations work to protect, restore and preserve it.

=== Brazilian Portuguese vocabulary ===
The word "cafetão" (pimp) is derived from caftan, the long coat traditionally used by Eastern European Jews. The word "polaca" (Polish woman) is commonly used in countries where Portuguese is spoken, but in Brazil it became extremely offensive to Polish people because it was used as synonymous to prostitute. So the words "polonesa" and "polonês" (Polish woman and Polish man) were created and are the only socially accepted way in Brazil to name people from Poland. As French pimps mainly from Marseille also bought women from to work as prostitutes in Brazil, the word "francesa" (Frenchwoman) also suffered the same fate, but it is still used in Brazilian Portuguese without a pejorative meaning. The word "encrenca", nowadays meaning trouble, derived from the Yiddish "en krenk" (a sick one, similar to the German "ein Kranker"), and originally referred to a man with venereal diseases.

== Cultural and literary references ==
The trafficking of women for sex work found mention in Yiddish literature. Among theater plays which raised the subject were Peretz Hirschbein's "Miriam" (1905–1908) and the directly focused Leib Malach's "Ibergus" (1927), as well as Sholem Asch's controversial 1906 play, Got fun Nekome (God of Vengeance), first presented in English in New York in 1923, causing a great scandal. Among Yiddish prose, the subject featured in Sholem Aleichem's The Man from Buenos Aires (Yiddish: "Der Mentsch fun Buenos Aires", 1909, English: 1987) and more recently in Isaac Bashevis Singer's "Scum" (Yiddish: "Shoym", year?; English: 1991).

The 1979 film Last Embrace by Jonathan Demme (based on the novel The Thirteenth Man by Murray Teigh Bloom and a screenplay by David Shaber) features a woman who, taking the role of the biblical avenger Goel Hadam, serially kills descendants of members of the New York Lower East Side Zwi Migdal who had enslaved her grandmother.

The 1991 film Naked Tango by Leonard Schrader alludes to the activities of Zwi Migdal. The film's heroine assumes the identity of an Eastern European woman traveling to Buenos Aires to meet a prospective husband and in the process gets herself caught up in the prostitution network. The film, however, is motivated more by sensationalism than by indignation.

The 2001 film Sonhos Tropicais ("Tropical Dreams"), directed by André Sturm, also deals with the same topic, following Esther, a Jewish girl from Poland lured into a false promise of marriage, who finds herself enslaved in brothels in Rio de Janeiro from 1899 to 1904. As a background, the film shows the Vaccine Revolt in the city.

The 2011 novel Korzeniec by Zbigniew Białas alludes to hundreds of young Jewish women being trafficked through the border of the Russian Empire to Prussia (now southern Poland) by a Jewish gang.

The 2006 novel El infierno prometido by Argentine writer Elsa Drucaroff tells the story of Dina, who falls prey to the Zwi Migdal.

The 2019 novel The Third Daughter by Talia Carner is a penetrating look into early 20th-century sex-trafficking. In a nod to Sholem Aleichem's The Man from Buenos Aires, Carner brings us Batya, the third daughter of a dairyman in the Russian countryside, a fourteen-year-old fleeing anti-Semitic pogroms with her family. Desperate, her father leaps at the opportunity to marry Batya to a worldly, wealthy stranger who guarantees his daughter a comfortable life and passage to America. But innocent Batya soon discovers her father has been duped as she is shipped as a sex-slave to Buenos Aires, a city where Zwi Migdal operates with impunity as prostitution is not only legal, but a pillar of the growing Argentinian economy.

The 2024 novella The Sailor & The Porteña by Nicholas Warack, Zwi Migdal acts as a primary antagonist throughout the story with its members and organization referred to as "the ruffians." They are noted as a corrupt and nefarious crime syndicate with significant influence and wealth.

== See also ==
- History of the Jews of Argentina
- Alfonse Pogrom
- White slave trade affair
