= White slave trade affair =

Historical scandal in Brussels, Belgium

The White slave trade affair (French: Affaire de la traite des blanches or Affaire des petites Anglaises; Dutch: Handel in blanke slavinnen) was an international scandal in Brussels, Belgium, in 1880–81.

In 1880, it was revealed that about fifty foreign girls had been sex trafficked illegally to work in brothels in Brussels. The case became a major scandal which attracted international infamy, especially since it became known that some people within the authorities had been involved in the trade. The scandal ended in both the mayor of Brussels as well as the head of the city's police force being forced to resign from their posts.

It attracted international attention to the issue of sex trafficking and became the starting point of the international campaign against sex trafficking.

== History ==
=== Background ===
During the French occupation of Belgium in the early 19th century (1794-1815), the French under Napoleon had introduced a system of registered prostitution in Brussels as well as other places in Europe occupied by the French. The Regulation System consisted of the registration of prostitutes, who were allowed to practice prostitution by the authorities in exchange for official registration and regular examinations for venereal disease.

This system, often called the "French system" or Regulation System, had become the normal in most of Europe during the 19th century. The system was supported by the authorities, because prostitution was viewed as a necessary evil; it was seen as unavoidable for men to engage in sex; that it was better that they did so with sex workers than to harass non-prostitute women; and that the Regulation System made it possible for the authorities to control prostitution and limit venereal disease, as well as the brothels functioning as information sources for the police.

In Brussels in particular, the Regulation System was seen as especially well managed, and was studied by foreign delegations as a role model for other countries. The system was managed by the city authorities and the city Police, who regularly inspected the registered brothels to ensure that they were managed in accordance with the rules, and had the authority to arrest and judge the prostitutes who broke the rules.

In the mid-19th century, however, the system was in crisis in Brussels. The number of registered brothels in Brussels was shrinking, and by 1876, there were only one dozen registered first-class brothels left in Brussels, and no second or third-class brothels left.

The shrinking number of brothels in Brussels concerned the authorities because it undermined the Regulation System, which was seen as a way to control prostitution, which was otherwise assumed to take place in secrecy outside of the control of the authorities. Police Commissioner Laeners was informed by the registered brothel owners that they were being met with competition from illegal brothels who were able to offer under age prostitutes, while the registered brothels had to follow the law, which banned any woman under the age of 21 to register as a prostitute in a brothel. When a reform in the Regulation System was introduced in August 1877, Laeners successfully suggested that the authorities turn a blind eye to under age workers in the brothels, provided that they were already prostitutes when they arrived.

Between January 1878, when the new law was put in force, and January 1880, at least forty women under 21 are estimated to have worked in the Brussels brothels. Women from countries that followed the Regulation System, such as Belgium, France, Germany and The Netherlands, were able to provide the registration officials with genuine certifications that while they were under 21, they were already prostitutes before entering the brothel, which made them legal.

British girls became a different matter for several reasons. In Britain, the age of consent was twelve and many girls of that age were active in the sex trade in London, which made them sought after in Brussels. However, there were no national Regulation System in Britain, which meant that British girls under 21 were not able to provide the Belgian authorities with a certificate that they were already prostitutes when they arrived in Belgium, which made it illegal for Belgian brothel owners to employ them.

At least ten under-aged girls were registered in the Brussels brothels during this time period; in at least one confirmed case, the girl was not only claimed to be older than she was but was later proved to have been forced against her will. All women employed at the brothels were assumed to be there voluntarily, and it was formally illegal to force anyone to work there.

The working conditions in the brothels of Brussels were described as miserable: the women were not given proper clothing but were forced to spend their days wearing night gowns; they were not allowed to say no to any client, and the brothel owner often took all their money with the argument that the girl had to repay the money the brothel owner had paid to get her to Belgium, before they were given any salary or be allowed to leave the brothel; the brothel owner would also sell them on to other brothel owners.

=== The case ===
In the autumn of 1879, a British businessman visited Brussels and was offered to buy sex from a nineteen-year-old British woman, who told him that she had been kidnapped in London. The businessman returned to Britain and informed a middleman, who repeated the story to the abolitionist Quaker Alfred Dyer. In the company of the Quaker George Gillet and Mary Steward of the LNA, Dyer visited Brussels and interviewed prostitutes, assisted by the Swiss clergyman Léonard Anet and the Belgian lawyer Alexis Splingard.

They collected a number of testimonies that formed the image, that there was an ongoing traffic, in which Belgian brothel owners imported underage girls and women between the ages of 13 and 21 from Britain to Brussels, and provided the Belgian police with false birth certificates stating that the girls and women were over the age of 21; the victims typically came voluntarily but under the impression that they were to be given a well-paid domestic job or even marriage, but on their arrival, they were beaten, starved and forced to work in the brothels.

An important initial case was that of the nineteen-year-old Adeline Tanner, who stated that she had been kidnapped from London by the Belgian brothel owner Eduoard Roger in September 1879.

Several girls were assisted by Steward to escape to Britain, where they were taken care of by abolitionist leader Josephine Butler in Liverpool. Josephine Butler published the information provided by Dyer in the article "The Modern Slave Trade" in the Shield 1 May 1880. The affair attracted great public attention, and a commission was formed on 5 August to address the allegations that British girls were kidnapped to work in brothels in Brussels. Among the members of the commission were Benjamin Schott, chamberlain of the City of London. The commission demanded that the government intervene and investigate the matter via the foreign minister Lord Granville.

When Josephine Butler visited Brussels, she presented the accusations to the mayor and authorities of Brussels. During her visit, she was also approached by the Belgian detective De Rudder, who informed her of the complicity of Police Commissioner Lenaers and of Schroeder, the official of the registered prostitution office.

The information she had gathered was also published with her approval by in the Belgian press by Henri Boland in the National. The Procureur du Roi in Brussels issued an investigation in the affair, and Butler gave him the information she had gathered.

The investigation resulted in the arrest of Eduoard Roger and eleven other individuals accused of being complicit in the trade. The first trial in the affair addressed the prosecution of brothel owners and pimps, who were accused and sentenced to fines and prison terms for having caused six British girls to live an immoral life.

Several brothel owners, pimps and other individuals were sentenced to fines and prison terms. Three individuals of high standing were also affected, though somewhat indirectly, by the affair. During the trials, Police Commissioner Lenaers was revealed to have an illegal monopoly of providing the brothels with alcohol, which resulted in him losing his position in July 1881; the official Schröder was deposed from his office by the city council after it was revealed that he had a mistress among the prostitutes in a brothel; and the Mayor of Brussels, Félix Vanderstraeten, resigned in February 1881 after it had been revealed that the biggest brothel in Brussels was situated in a house sold to the brothel owner by the mayor.

Thirty-four British girls and women who had been kept at brothels in Brussels were repatriated to Britain on their own request.

=== Aftermath ===
The scandal attracted international attention to the ongoing issue of sex trafficking. The intense press coverage resulted in public interest in the issue. It resulted in an international campaign against sex trafficking, which became labelled as white slave trade. Campaigns against sex trafficking first started in Belgium after the scandal of 1880, and spread from there to Great Britain in 1885, to France in 1902 and to the United States in 1907.

== See also ==
- Zwi Migdal
- Sexual slavery
- Ashkenazum
- The Maiden Tribute of Modern Babylon
