= Hiroko Hayashi =

Hiroko Hayashi may refer to:

- Hiroko Hayashi (林 寛子, born 1933), better known as Chikage Oogi, Japanese actress and politician
- Hiroko Hayashi (singer) (林 寛子, born 1959), Japanese singer, actress and television personality
