= Chuck Riley (voice actor) =

American voice actor (1940–2007)

- Chuck Riley, ca. 1960
- Born: Charles Daniel Hanks Jr. July 21, 1940; Kaplan, Louisiana, U.S.
- Died: May 10, 2007 (aged 66); Sherman Oaks, California, U.S.
- Other names: Chuck Dann; Charlie Tuna
- Occupation: Voice actor
- Years active: 1964–2007
- Spouses: Kay Wright (m. 1968; div. 1982) Cher Smart (m. 1995)
- Children: 5

Charles Daniel Hanks Jr. (July 21, 1940 – May 10, 2007), better known as Chuck Riley, was an American voice actor. He was famous for recording hundreds of movie trailers, television commercials, network promotions, and children's audiobooks. In his earlier years as a radio DJ, he was known as Chuck Dann and Charlie Tuna.

== Life and career ==
Charles D. Hanks Jr. was born July 21, 1940, in Kaplan, Louisiana. The first child born to Charles and Irene Hanks, he was nicknamed Danny. In 1952, the family moved to Duncan, Oklahoma, where he graduated from high school in 1958. He was soon working at radio station KOMA in Oklahoma City, where he was first known as Chuck Dann, then later as Charlie Tuna. (It was at KOMA that Chuck Riley gave a young Art Ferguson his air name -- Charlie Tuna.)

In 1964 he was on the air as Chuck Dann on CKY in Winnipeg. From there he went to WKYC in Cleveland in 1967, again as Chuck Dann.

By 1972, he had married, had a son and was the dominant afternoon drive jock at WIBC in Indianapolis as Chuck Riley, the name he would use from then on. Riley was also known throughout Indianapolis as the voice of Indy's 1st ever Rock 40 music station Stereo 93 WNAP having recorded the now legendary and iconic "The wrath of The Buzzard" TOH ID.

During his years at WIBC, Riley would often travel to Toronto, Ontario, to narrate various radio documentaries for CHUM 1050. He was first hired to be the 1st American imaging voice for the top rated CHUM AM, then in 1969, he narrated a 28 hour radio special titled "1050 CHUM's The history of Rock". Then in 1970, he was back in Toronto narrating "1050 CHUM's The story of The Beatles" a 12 hour history of the group that was also syndicated around the world. And then in 1976 came his biggest CHUM project yet "1050 CHUM's The evolution of Rock", a 64 hour special that took the CHUM listeners from the beginning of Rock 'N' Roll right up to 1976. "The evolution of Rock" won a prestigious Billboard Magazine Award for International Syndicated Special of the Year. The program was later syndicated around the world by TM Productions in Dallas.

In 1979, Riley began a Hollywood voiceover career, moving his family to the San Fernando Valley in Los Angeles. Within a year, he was one of the dominant voices in the industry.

In the 1980s and 90s he did voice work for KMPC, KBIG, and KZLA-KPOL Los Angeles, CKY Winnipeg, KQWB Fargo N.D., WOGL Oldies 98.1 and WIBG Philadelphia, KVIL Dallas/Ft. Worth, WQHT Hot 103 and then Hot 97 New York, WLOL Minneapolis, WAVA Washington, D.C., and KPWR Power 106 Los Angeles, KXXX X-100 San Francisco, among others.

In the early 1980s he became the voice of CBS television and Emmis Broadcasting. He went on to perform voice work for thousands of movies for the studios of Warner Bros., Universal, Fox and Paramount.

In 1989, producer Doug Thompson, who'd worked with Chuck at CHUM Toronto moved to Los Angeles and hired Chuck to be the announcer on actor John Candy's weekly two-hour radio series, "Radio Kandy". He also narrated many productions and movies, such as Oliver Stone's Nixon, and CHUM's 1976 documentary The Evolution of Rock, The Killing of America, and Galaxies are Colliding. He narrated hundreds of children's audio books, mainly Disney Read-Alongs, and was an announcer for numerous commercials.

Up to his death, Riley was still recording voiceovers for KABC-TV in Los Angeles.

=== Death ===
Chuck Riley died at age 66 of renal complications on May 10, 2007, in Sherman Oaks, California. He was survived by his five children.

== Selected credits ==
- The Godfather - Trailer voiceover
- CHUM's 1976 radio documentary The Evolution of Rock - Narrator
- E.T. - Trailer voiceover
- The Killing of America – Narrator
- Die Hard – Trailer voiceover
- Child's Play 2 – Trailer voiceover
- Trump Card - Announcer
- The Hand That Rocks the Cradle – Trailer voiceover
- Galaxies Are Colliding – Narrator
- Il Postino – Trailer voiceover
- Oliver Stone's Nixon - Narrator
- Disney's The Hunchback of Notre Dame – Trailer voiceover
- Boy Meets World (TV Series) – Voice of the announcer
- Columbia TriStar Family Collection - Trailer voiceover
- Titanic - Trailer voiceover
- Ronin – Trailer voiceover
- Oklahoma City Bombing (TV Special) – Narrator
- Susan Smith: Nine Days of Deception (TV Special) – Narrator
- Disney's Treasure Planet: Disney Read Along – Narrator
- Meet The Robinsons – Narrator
- Apollo 13: The True Story - Narrator
- Hamburger Hill - Trailer voiceover
