= Simon Rubinstein (pimp) =

Crimean Jewish immigrant to Argentina, businessman, brothel owner and human trafficker

- Born: ca. 1880; Odessa, Russian Empire
- Died: 1965; Buenos Aires, Argentina
- Occupation(s): pimp, factory owner

Simon Rubinstein or Rubenstein (fl. 1900-1939) was an Argentine Jewish businessman and pimp, who headed the criminal organization Ashkenazum, an offshoot of the larger Zwi Migdal, in the first half of the 20th century.

== Biography ==
Rubinstein arrived in Buenos Aires from Odessa in the year 1900, and quickly became the owner of a condom factory. He was a very successful businessman and was heavily involved in the silk trade of the country. At some point he became involved with the Zwi Migdal, which trafficked thousands of Jewish women from shtetls in Eastern Europe across the world for sex slavery.

He founded a splinter group of the Zwi Migdal, called the Ashkenazum, and had over 700 agents working for him in Argentina. Members included pimps, madams, porteras as well as the spouses of the male members. He was the owner of most of the bordellos in San Fernando, a city in the province of Buenos Aires.

Rubinstein was said to be so well connected that he stored the furniture for a Buenos Aires judge in one of his brothels. The Ashkenazum was a financial success, and like the Zwi Migdal, had a plot of land and a cemetery of its own on the outskirts of Buenos Aires. The sex trafficking trade was dismantled after a former member betrayed it to authorities, leading to the conviction and deportation of 108 pimps to Uruguay.

== See also ==
- Sexual slavery
- Alfonse Pogrom
- Raquel Liberman
