= Alfonse Pogrom =

Riot in Warsaw in May 1905

The Alfonse pogrom (in Polish, Pogrom alfonsów 'pogrom of the pimps'; the Polish slang term alfons means 'pimp'; 24–26 May 1905) was a three-day riot in Warsaw, Poland. The violence led to the destruction of several dozen brothels, and to as many as 15 deaths. Accounts and analyses of the event differ with regard to its goals and participants (varying as to the participation of Jewish Bund labor-party militants, Jewish workers, Christian workers, and criminals; as well as to the genesis of the event and the exact numbers of casualties).

== Background ==
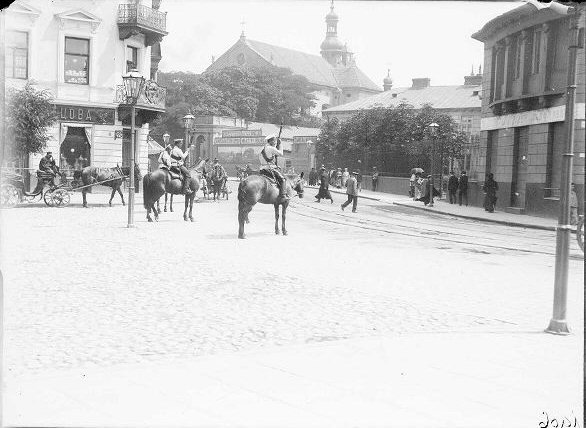
Cossacks holding their rifles up, photographed on Senatorska street near the Blue Palace, Warsaw, during one of the riots in 1905

In the second half of the 19th century, prostitution, sex trafficking, and sexual slavery became widespread in Warsaw. These activities were mostly dominated by the Jewish underworld, and their existence caused much tension and controversy within Warsaw's Polish-Jewish community. While in Congress Poland and Warsaw, overall, 72.7% of prostitutes were Catholic and 21.36% were Jewish, in Warsaw the proportion of Jewish prostitutes was much higher. In 1874 two-thirds of all registered prostitutes in Warsaw were Jewish. In 1889 around 75% of all brothels in Warsaw were run by Jews.

Accounts differ as to the cause of the violence. Some consider this a political action by Jewish workers. As violent riots escalated during the unrest in the mid-1900s, tensions between the Jewish underworld and workers grew to the point where a violent wide-scale incident was increasingly likely. According to Laura Engelstein, the pimps were perceived by Bundists to be agents of the Okhrana (Russian Tsarist police).

== The riot ==
The pogrom started following a rumor, though it is not clear which rumor actually sparked the pogrom. One version suggests that a sister or fiancée of a Bund activist was kidnapped and taken to a brothel, and he was wounded trying to rescue her. Another says a Jewish prostitute asked a Jewish worker for help in her plight, and when he tried to rescue her, he was killed. All versions suggest that after the rescuer was injured or killed, his friends started a large-scale riot. Jewish activists associated with the Bund labor party were involved in the rioting.

Another version is that the reason for the riot was criminal interference in the competition between legal and illegal brothels. Antony Polonsky rejects the view that this was a political action organized by the Bund as "a reaction of Jewish workers to the exploitation of Jewish women." Polonsky writes that the criminal underworld was substantially involved, and he notes that "only licensed brothels were affected".

Although accounts of events differ, most agree that bands of Jewish workers went from brothel to brothel, assaulting pimps and prostitutes, destroying and looting property. Clashes also spread into the city streets. The rioting started in northwest Warsaw before spreading throughout the city. According to some scholars (for instance Borzymińska and Jakubczak) the rioting was joined on the second day by Christian workers, and the third day saw criminals take advantage of the chaos to commit robberies. Jewish workers acted only in the Jewish neighborhood, striking just the Jewish parts of the underworld. Christian workers did corresponding with the Christian gangsters. Tsarist police authorities allegedly attempted to orchestrate an anti-Jewish pogrom (such accusations are part of the Bund narrative of the events), but when the attempt failed, the Russian governor, Konstantin Maximovich ordered the military to suppress the riot.

The riot is considered to have been put down by 26 May 1905, though lesser incidents continued for a few more days, with 3 further fatalities on 28 May.

== Aftermath ==
During the disturbances 150 dwellings (including 40 brothels) were destroyed, with property damage estimated at 200,000 rubles, 5 people were killed, 10 severely injured (most died later in hospitals) and over 40 injured. According to Scott Ury, 5 persons were killed in the events themselves, another 10 died from wounds they incurred, and over 40 were hospitalized. According to a Reuter report, the number of injured was 100. Police arrested close to 100 pimps and prostitutes.

The Bund leadership at first criticized its activists who took part in the rioting, but later changed its stance and claimed the riot was a righteous action against the morally corrupt government and criminals.

The riot brought the problem of prostitution in Poland to wider public attention and led to attempts to address the problem through further debate and reforms. Leo Belmont wrote a poem, "Po pogromie" ("After the Pogrom"), about the incident.

== See also ==
- Ashkenazum
- Raquel Liberman
- Sexual slavery
- Simon Rubinstein (pimp)
- Zwi Migdal
