= Old Boyfriends =

- Theatrical release poster
- Directed by: Joan Tewkesbury
- Written by: Paul Schrader; Leonard Schrader
- Produced by: Edward R. Pressman; Michele Rappaport
- Starring: Talia Shire; Richard Jordan; Keith Carradine; John Belushi; John Houseman; Buck Henry
- Cinematography: William A. Fraker
- Edited by: William H. Reynolds
- Music by: David Shire
- Production company: Pressman Film
- Distributed by: AVCO Embassy Pictures
- Release date: April 13, 1979
- Running time: 103 minutes
- Country: United States
- Language: English
- Budget: $3 million

Old Boyfriends is a 1979 American drama film directed by Joan Tewkesbury and written by the brothers Paul and Leonard Schrader. The film stars Talia Shire, Richard Jordan, Keith Carradine, John Belushi, John Houseman and Buck Henry. The film was released on March 22, 1979, by Embassy Pictures.

== Plot ==
Dianne Cruise is a clinical psychologist who is suffering with an identity crisis and struggling with her marriage. In an attempt to learn about herself, Dianne goes on a road trip to reconnect with three of her old boyfriends.

Her first stop is in Colorado, where she appears on the set of a documentary movie that her college boyfriend, Jeff Turin is making. It's a campaign ad for a state politician. The star of the ad is Sam the Fisherman, who criticizes the political opponent for policies that lead to the pollution of streams. On the set Sam the Fisherman flirts with Cruise. After the ad has finished shooting, Cruise joins the cast and crew at a bar, where Sam attempts again to seduce Cruise, unsuccessfully. Turin and Cruise start talking, and they agree to meet again the next night in the parking lot.

They meet again the next night and return to Cruise's hotel, where they have sex. They both tell each other they are married, but Cruise later tells Turin that her husband has committed suicide. Turin then tells Cruise that his wife has left him and is living with an artist in Canada. After a brief affair where Diane and Jeff's daughter Dylan bond quickly, Cruise leaves without saying goodbye to Turin.

The second destination is Minneapolis, where she finds her high school boyfriend, Eric Katz, who started a formal-wear business and is in a band that plays high school dances and depressing hotel lounges. She meets him by calling his business and requesting that a formal dress be dropped off for a conference she's attending. When Katz appears at her hotel room, he realizes that Cruise is his ex-girlfriend, and he invites her to see two of his shows. He attempts to seduce her but she initially refuses. After the second show, in a high school gymnasium, Cruise agrees to sleep with Katz. They drive in her muscle car to a scenic look-out. Cruise asks Katz to pretend to bully her into having sex, re-enacting an episode from their high school relationship in which he did cajole her into having sex and then subsequently bragged about it to his friends and humiliated her. While leading Katz to believe that they are about to have sex, Cruise gets Katz out of her car, and then drives away, leaving him at the look-out with no pants and avenging the earlier treatment Katz subjected her to.

A confused Turin hires ace private investigator Art Kopple to find Cruise. While they are in Kopple's office, he makes some phone calls using the details about Diane's background that Turin pieced together and immediately finds Cruise's place of business and home address. Turin goes to the clinic where Cruise works, and is shocked when Cruise's colleague tells him that she left her job without warning amidst concerns about her state of mind, and indirectly reveals that her husband David Brinks isn't dead at all. Turin visits Brinks, who has a new life with an attractive young girlfriend and tells Turin that Diane has been in a downward mental spiral for three years--which peaked when she tried to crash her car into a brick wall but hit a chain-link fence instead. Brinks makes it clear he's done with Diane.

Cruise's third destination is a small town in Minnesota where she tries to track down her first boyfriend. She checks into a hotel across the street from the ex-boyfriend's childhood home. Cruise knocks on the door and meets her ex-boyfriend's younger brother and mother. The younger brother, Wayne Van Til (Keith Carradine), informs Cruise that her former boyfriend was killed in Vietnam. Diane talks to Wayne and finds him nice but also very strange. The mother confides in Cruise that Wayne has been damaged by the death of his older brother, is still living at home, has no job and no friends.

Cruise offers to work with Wayne and help him recover from the emotional trauma of his older brother's death. Cruise and Van Til, however, become sexually involved, which has a negative effect on Wayne's emotional health and leads to his re-hospitalization. After being upbraided by Wayne's mother and ordered to get out of his life permanently, Cruise goes to the hospital, and meets with Van Til's psychiatrist, Dr. Hoffman. Dr. Hoffman condemns her for inflicting emotional distress on Wayne, and his harsh but accurate overview of her actions and emotions leave her in tears. She walks past Wayne's room and heads back to Southern California.

At the end of the film, Turin confronts Cruise at her home. She hesitates to engage with him but after he appears to give up and wishes her a sincere goodbye, she tells him to wait. They reconcile and become a couple again, sharing a new life together along with Dylan.

== Cast ==
- Talia Shire as Dianne Cruise
- Richard Jordan as Jeff Turin
- Keith Carradine as Wayne Van Til
- John Belushi as Eric Katz
- John Houseman as Doctor Hoffman
- Buck Henry as Art Kopple
- Nina Jordan as Dylan Turin
- Gerrit Graham as Sam The Fisherman
- P. J. Soles as Sandy
- Bethel Leslie as Mrs. Van Til
- Joan Hotchkis as Pamela Shaw
- William Bassett as David Brinks
- Murphy Dunne as Keyboard Player

== Production ==
Old Boyfriends was made without a distribution deal. The film had a cost of $2.5 million in cash and $0.5 million in deferments. Talia's husband David Shire scored the movie.

== Reception ==
Old Boyfriends received mixed reviews upon release. Vincent Canby of The New York Times called it "a movie in which the characters are more intelligent and interesting than anything they are required to do ... The writing veers back and forth between the good and the appalling." Dale Pollock of Variety wrote, "What's missing, in both the Schraders' script and Tewkesbury's direction, is a strong sense of just why Shire is trying to recapture her past, other than idle curiosity. As in other Schrader pix, the characters are carefully distanced, and only Jordan projects any real warmth." Gene Siskel of the Chicago Tribune gave the film 2.5 stars out of 4 and wrote that it was "wildly uneven" in tone and had "too many stories. I would have preferred that one relationship, the adult one with Richard Jordan, had been examined in greater detail. She and Jordan seem like an interesting couple. But their rapprochement is rudely severed and what follows after their first encounter appears to be dictated by psychological theory." Charles Champlin of the Los Angeles Times stated, "Despite the raucous interlude with Belushi, 'Old Boyfriends' is a quiet and well-observed romantic drama and a promising start for a directing career, revealing most particularly a gift for evoking good performances." Gary Arnold of The Washington Post wrote, "In 'Old Boyfriends,' director Joan Tewkesbury and a talented cast end up hostages to an unsalvageable script."

On Rotten Tomatoes, the film holds a rating of 60% from 15 reviews.

== In popular culture ==
John Belushi performs "Jailhouse Rock" with his character's bar band. On keyboards is fellow Blues Brother Murphy Dunne. Belushi himself chose the musicians who appeared as his bandmates.
