= Ashkenazum =

Organised crime group in Argentina

- Founder: Simon Rubinstein
- Years active: early 1900s-1930s
- Territory: Argentina (Buenos Aires)
- Ethnicity: Jewish
- Activities: pimping, human trafficking
- Allies: Zwi Migdal

The Ashkenazum was an organized crime group active in Argentina in the first half of the 20th century. Ashkenazum was founded by Simon Rubinstein as a splinter group from the larger Zwi Migdal, an organized crime group that stretched across five continents and specialized in the sex trafficking of Eastern European Jewish girls.

Simon Rubinstein arrived in Buenos Aires in 1900 from Odessa, and there he quickly acquired control of a condom factory. He was a notorious silk smuggler and became affiliated with the Zwi Migdal. At the height of his operation, he had 700 agents in Argentina trafficking women for him.

Like the larger Zwi Migdal, the Ashkenazum also had its own cemetery outside of Buenos Aires.

== See also ==
- History of the Jews of Argentina
- Raquel Liberman
- Alfonse Pogrom
