= Scattering Dad =

- Written by: Joan Tewkesbury; Barbara Bosson
- Directed by: Joan Tewkesbury
- Starring: Olympia Dukakis; Andy Griffith
- Music by: Michel Colombier
- Country of origin: United States
- Original language: English

Production
- Executive producers: Barbara Bosson; Karen Danaher-Dorr; David R. Ginsburg
- Producer: Anthony Santa Croce
- Cinematography: Dennis C. Lewiston
- Editor: Robert P. Seppey
- Running time: 97 minutes
- Production companies: Barbara Bosson Productions; Citadel Entertainment

Original release
- Network: CBS
- Release: January 4, 1998

Scattering Dad is a 1998 American made-for-television drama film directed by Joan Tewkesbury and starring Olympia Dukakis and Andy Griffith. It aired on CBS on January 4, 1998.

== Premise ==
An agoraphobic woman who hasn't left her home in 20 years receives a visit from the spirit of her deceased husband who reminds her of a promise she made to scatter his ashes at his favorite vacation spot. With her daughters unavailable, she sets off to fulfill the promise herself.

== Cast ==
- Olympia Dukakis as Dotty
- Lucinda Jenney as Molly
- Michelle Burke as Taylor
- August Schellenberg as Fierce Crow
- Andy Griffith as Hiram
- Jo Harvey Allen as Reva
- Elaine Miles as Elaine
