= Strangers (1992 film) =

1992 American TV miniseries

- Written by: Ed Redlich; Sarah Timberman; Nevin Schreiner; Judith Rascoe
- Directed by: Daniel Vigne; Wayne Wang; Joan Tewkesbury
- Starring: Linda Fiorentino; Joan Chen; Timothy Hutton
- Music by: Maurice Jarre
- Original language: English

Production
- Cinematography: Robert Fraisse
- Editor: Thierry Simonet
- Running time: 85 minutes

Original release
- Network: HBO
- Release: 1992 – 1992

Strangers is a 1992 American erotic drama anthology television film directed by Daniel Vigne, Joan Tewkesbury and Wayne Wang and starring Linda Fiorentino, Joan Chen and Timothy Hutton. It was broadcast in three parts on HBO.

== Cast ==
- Linda Fiorentino as Helen
- Joan Chen as The Girl
- Timothy Hutton as Tom
- James Remar as Bernard
- Lambert Wilson as The Guy
- Alexandra Vandernoot as The Woman
- François Montagut as The Frenchman
