= Tora-san, the Matchmaker =

- Theatrical poster
- Directed by: Yoji Yamada
- Written by: Yoji Yamada; Yoshitaka Asama
- Starring: Kiyoshi Atsumi; Kaori Momoi
- Cinematography: Tetsuo Takaba
- Edited by: Iwao Ishii
- Music by: Naozumi Yamamoto
- Distributed by: Shochiku
- Release date: August 4, 1979
- Running time: 107 minutes
- Country: Japan
- Language: Japanese

Tora-san, the Matchmaker (男はつらいよ 翔んでる寅次郎, Otoko wa Tsurai yo: Tonderu Torajirō) a.k.a. Tora-san Riding High is a 1979 Japanese comedy film directed by Yoji Yamada. It stars Kiyoshi Atsumi as Torajirō Kuruma (Tora-san), and Kaori Momoi as his love interest or "Madonna". Tora-san, the Matchmaker is the twenty-third entry in the popular, long-running Otoko wa Tsurai yo series.

== Synopsis ==
Tora-san convinces the hesitant Hitomi to go through with her plans to marry her intended spouse.

== Cast ==
- Kiyoshi Atsumi as Torajiro
- Chieko Baisho as Sakura
- Kaori Momoi as Hitomi Irie
- Akira Fuse as Kunio Koyanagi
- Michiyo Kogure as Kuniko Irie
- Masami Shimojō as Kuruma Tatsuzō
- Chieko Misaki as Tsune Kuruma (Torajiro's aunt)
- Gin Maeda as Hiroshi Suwa
- Hayato Nakamura as Mitsuo Suwa
- Hisao Dazai as Boss (Umetarō Katsura)
- Hiroshi Inuzuka as Taxi driver
- Gajirō Satō as Genkō
- Chishū Ryū as Gozen-sama
- Tatsuo Matsumura as Reikichi Matsuda

== Critical appraisal ==
Tora-san, the Matchmaker was the third top box-office film in Japan for the year of 1979. For his performances in Tora-san, the Matchmaker and the next entry in the series, Tora-san's Dream of Spring (also 1979), Kiyoshi Atsumi was nominated for Best Actor at the Japan Academy Prize ceremony. Chieko Baisho was nominated for Best Supporting Actress at the same ceremony for both films also.

Stuart Galbraith IV writes that one of the pleasures of Tora-san, the Matchmaker is in the performance of noted actress Michiyo Kogure in one of her last roles. The German-language site molodezhnaja gives Tora-san, the Matchmaker three out of five stars.

== Availability ==
Tora-san, the Matchmaker was released theatrically on August 4, 1979. In Japan, the film was released on videotape in 1996, and in DVD format in 2000, 2005, and 2008.

== Bibliography ==
=== English ===
- "OTOKO WA TSURAI YO TONDERU TORAJIRO (1979)". British Film Institute. Archived from the original on 2012-10-17.
- "OTOKO WA TSURAIYO -TONDERU TORAJIRO". Complete Index to World Film.
- Otoko wa tsurai yo: Tonderu Torajirô (1979) at IMDb
- Galbraith IV, Stuart (2006-05-06). "Tora-san 23: Tora-san the Matchmaker (Region 3)". DVD Talk.

=== German ===
- "Tora-San, the Matchmaker" (in German). www.molodezhnaja.ch.

=== Japanese ===
- 男はつらいよ 翔んでる寅次郎(1979) (in Japanese). allcinema.net.
- "男はつらいよ 翔んでる寅次郎". Japanese Cinema Database (Agency for Cultural Affairs). Archived from the original on 2014-02-02.
- 男はつらいよ 翔んでる寅次郎 (in Japanese). Japanese Movie Database.
- 男はつらいよ 翔んでる寅次郎 (in Japanese). Kinema Junpo. Archived from the original on 2012-03-21.
