= Leonard Schrader =

American film director (1943–2006)

- Born: November 30, 1943; Grand Rapids, Michigan
- Died: November 2, 2006 (aged 62); Los Angeles, California
- Years active: 1974–2006
- Spouse: Chieko Schrader (m. 1977)
- Relatives: Paul Schrader (brother)

Leonard Schrader (November 30, 1943 – November 2, 2006) was an American screenwriter and director, most notable for his ability to write Japanese-language films and for his many collaborations with his brother, Paul Schrader. He earned an Academy Award nomination for the screenplay he wrote for the film Kiss of the Spider Woman.

== Early life and college ==
Born in Grand Rapids, Michigan, Schrader was brought up in a strict Dutch Calvinist family and did not see his first film until he was an adult. In 1968, he finished his MFA at the University of Iowa's Writer's Workshop, where he studied with Nelson Algren, Kurt Vonnegut, Jorge Luis Borges, Richard Yates, Robert Coover and José Donoso.

== Japan ==
After graduating, Schrader left Grand Rapids in the Midwest and escaped the draft by moving to Japan to teach. (According to Peter Biskind, in his book Easy Riders, Raging Bulls, Schrader left the U.S. when he received a draft induction notice and didn't return until he was 28 years old - and thus ineligible for the draft.)

Between 1969 and 1973 Schrader escaped even further, slipping by night into the subculture of the Yamaguchi-gumi (the dominant Yakuza gangster organization in the Kansai area of Japan, which includes Kobe, Kyoto and Osaka), while by day teaching American Literature at Doshisha University and Kyoto University.

During his time in Japan he met his future wife, Chieko Schrader. They married in 1977.

His living family includes brother Paul Schrader, niece Molly, and nephew Sam.

== Film career ==
His experiences with the Yakuza in Japan led to a collaboration on a story with his brother, Paul Schrader. This resulted in the film The Yakuza (1974), starring Robert Mitchum and directed by Sydney Pollack. Leonard and Paul also co-wrote Blue Collar (1978), a story of defiant auto-workers in Detroit, directed by Paul Schrader starring Richard Pryor, Yaphet Kotto and Harvey Keitel, and Old Boyfriends (1979), about a woman's cross-country trek to visit old flames, directed by Joan Tewkesbury and starring John Belushi, Talia Shire, Keith Carradine, John Houseman.

Schrader's other screenplay credits include such popular Japanese-language films as Tora-san's Dream of Spring (1979), The Man Who Stole the Sun (Japan's Best Film of the Year in 1980), and Shonben Rider (1983). In 1982, with wife Chieko Schrader, he co-wrote The Killing of America, a documentary tracing the origins of U.S. violence.

During this production, Leonard Schrader collaborated with New York experimental filmmaker, David Weisman. Schrader's background in Latin American literature and Weisman's experience with Brazil led them to develop Kiss of the Spider Woman together. Schrader's screenplay adaptation, based on the avant-garde novel by Argentinian Manuel Puig, earned him an Academy Award nomination in 1986. (It also earned William Hurt an Academy Award for Best Actor.)

Schrader met renowned Japanese novelist Yukio Mishima while living in Japan. For a decade after the author's ritual suicide in 1970, Schrader pursued the rights to Mishima's life, and working with his wife Chieko and brother Paul, he co-wrote the Japanese-language bio-pic Mishima: A Life in Four Chapters executive-produced in 1984 by George Lucas and Francis Ford Coppola, and directed by Paul Schrader.

Schrader made his directorial debut with Naked Tango (1991) for which he also wrote the screenplay (although previously he also directed the 1982's film The Killing of America, this is the first time he solely directed the film, as in The Killing of America, he co-directed with Sheldon Renan). Produced in Argentina, with the 1925 period 'look' overseen by Oscar-winning designer Milena Canonero, the independent film starred Vincent D'Onofrio, Mathilda May, Esai Morales, and the late Fernando Rey.

== Death ==
Schrader died on November 2, 2006, in Los Angeles, California.

== Filmography ==
Year	Title	Director	Writer	Producer	Notes
1974	The Yakuza	No	Story	No	
1978	Blue Collar	No	Yes	No	
1979	Old Boyfriends	No	Yes	No	
1979	Tora-san's Dream of Spring	No	Yes	No	
1979	The Man Who Stole the Sun	No	Yes	No	Japan's Best Film of the Year, 1980
1982	The Killing of America	Yes	Yes	Yes	Documentary film Co-directed with Sheldon Renan
1985	Mishima: A Life in Four Chapters	No	Yes	Associate	
1985	Kiss of the Spider Woman	No	Yes	No	Academy Award-nominee
1990	Naked Tango	Yes	Yes	No	

== Teaching ==
- From 1996 to 1999, Schrader taught the screenwriting Master's Thesis class at the University of Southern California.
- From 1999 to 2003, Schrader taught at Chapman University where he was an associate professor of film.
- From 2003 until his death, Schrader was Senior Filmmaker-in-Residence at the American Film Institute where he chaired the Screenwriting Department and taught graduate screenwriting.
