= Sheldon Renan =

American writer and filmmaker

Sheldon Renan (born 1941) is an American writer and filmmaker. His first book, An Introduction to the American Underground Film, was published in America by Dutton in 1967. In England, it was printed by Studio Vista (1968) as The Underground film. An introduction to its development in America. It was the first book about underground film. He is a graduate of Yale University and a Rockefeller Grant recipient.

== Career ==
=== "The Blue Mouse and the Movie Experience" ===
Prior to publishing An Introduction to the American Underground Film, Renan published his essay "The Blue Mouse and the Movie Experience" in a special "Expanded Arts Issue" of Film Culture. It was a rumination on the Blue Mouse Theatre in Portland, Oregon. In November 1966, Renan had a contract with E. P. Dutton to write a book about underground film. He returned to Portland to work on the book. He watched films at the Blue Mouse, a once first run theatre that had descended to grindhouse fare, where he had seen Hollywood product as a child, to witness how film itself had changed, and also how film had changed him. In 2014 Andrew V. Uroskie wrote the book Between the Black Box and the White Cube: Expanded Cinema and Postwar Art. Uroskie identified "The Blue Mouse and The Movie Experience" as an important text, one of a series of seminal articles written in the '60s that captured the transformation of art and film from traditional, rigid, academic works to more open and liminal works that included happenings, expanded cinema and "new media". His interview of the Kuchar Brothers was published in Film Culture magazine in 1968.

=== An Introduction to the American Underground Film ===
As the first book about underground film, Renan's book began a serious look at such filmmakers as George and Mike Kuchar, Jack Smith, Marie Menken and many others. It has also been used as a text book in many college film classes.

=== Motion pictures ===
Renan worked as an advertising copywriter 1964–1968 in New York, San Francisco, and Japan. His first screenplay (with Donald Richie) was for "Basic Film Terms" (1970). In 1975 he wrote the PBS series The Japanese Film (co-written with U.S. Ambassador to Japan Edwin Reischauer). In 1979 he directed the documentary short The Electronic Rainbow: An Introduction to Television. In 1981 he directed the feature documentary The Killing of America. In 1984 he wrote and directed the feature film Treasure: In Search of the Golden Horse. In 1987 he directed the feature documentary AIDS: What Everyone Needs to Know. It was produced by the Aids Project LA, Churchill Films and the UCLA Center for Interdisciplinary Research on Immunology and Disease. In 1990 he wrote the screenplay for the feature film Lambada, based on a story by, and directed by Joel Silberg. Jon Pareles, in his review for the New York Times', said Lambada is the kind of bizarrely updated old hat in which the club's kindly bouncer, Big, tells a reluctant student, Ramon, "You got potential - college potential....(and) has a burnished, big-budget glow." In 1994 he wrote the screenplay for the Untouchables TV episode "Only For You."

Renan appears in the films Godard in America (Ralph Thanhauser, director, 1970) and Birth of a Nation (Jonas Mekas, director, 1997).

=== Pacific Film Archive ===
Renan was the founding director of the Pacific Film Archive, University Art Museum, University of California at Berkeley, 1967–1974. He had first approached both the San Francisco Museum of Modern Art and the Oakland Museum, before Peter Selz, Berkeley Art Museum's first director, said yes to Renan's proposal of a film archive. He had envisioned an institution devoted to the exhibition, preservation, and study of cinema. Renan led the Pacific Film Archive through 1974.

=== National Endowment for the Arts media funding panel ===
Renan was one of nine on the 1970 NEA funding panel. The others were Roger Englander (chairman), Arthur Mayer, Dean Myhr, Donn Pennebaker, James Blue, David Stewar, George Stoney and Willard Van Dyke. It was Renan's idea that the NEA should fund regional film centers. Through his championship, the NEA funded film centers in Chicago, Detroit, Berkeley and Portland, Oregon. The Berkeley Art Museum and Pacific Film Archive opened in 1971. The Northwest Film Center in Portland opened in 1971. The Film Center of the School of the Art Institute of Chicago in Chicago opened in 1972. The Detroit Film Theatre opened in 1974. All four currently survive.

=== Treasure: In Search of the Golden Horse ===
Renan's book Treasure: In Search of the Golden Horse was published in 1984. It announced a treasure hunt for an object hidden somewhere in the United States, that when found would result in a half million dollar prize. In May 1984 the New York Times had reported "In September, Warner Books will publish Treasure, a book containing a complete set of clues to help readers find a sculpted gold horse. Warner will publish Treasure in conjunction with IntraVision, a New York packager and producer. Written by Sheldon Renan and a writer identified as Dr. Crypton, whose monthly column appears in Science Digest, the $12.95 book will contain all the necessary clues. Those clues will also be available in the form of a home video cassette and disk that follow the story line of the book, a cable television show, a record album and a combination of board, computer and video games. In 1986 the New York Times published a follow up article about students at Lakeland Schools in Westchester who were sure they were hot on the trail of the prize and were already figuring out what to do with the prize money. In 1989 the Times published a final follow up article. It gave background on the treasure hunt craze of the early 1980s "The treasure hunt promotions peaked with two best sellers published in the early 1980s, Masquerade, by Kit Williams, which offered $35,000 to the finder of a golden hare, and Who Killed the Robins Family by Bill Adler and Thomas Chastain, which offered $10,000 to the reader who submitted the best answer to their puzzle. Both books sold more than a million copies each." It quoted John Baker, editor of Publishers Weekly, saying "there are no industry figures, but none of the 10 or so treasure books and videos since 1982 have matched the success of the first two." The article announced the treasure could not be found and those searching should give up and quit. In accordance with the rules, since the treasure was not found, the $500,000 was donated to charity, specifically to the Big Brothers/Big Sisters of America. The article quoted several disgruntled searchers, including Deborah Holmes of Monroeville, Pa. There are a lot of angry people. Treasure was also released as a straight to video feature film, laserdisc, and an episodic television show that aired on pay cable channels.

=== A Symposium on Bruce Conner ===
On Sep 23, 2016, at MOMA, an all day event celebrated the life of Bruce Conner. Renan's one-hour talk centered on a 1967 panel he had chaired, in which Bruce Conner threw the only copy his film Leader into the audience, in an act of artistic "filmicide".

=== Corporate writer ===
Renan has written for major corporations including Intel, Xerox, AT&T, Apple, Sony and others. For the public sector his clients have included the U.S. Military Health Service and the Department of State. His speeches for CEO's include for every CEO of Xerox since 1990. His first assignment for Intel was for their launch of the 486 chip. For the entertainment industry he has written for Disney, Universal Studios, and Busch Seaworld.
