= The Killing of America =

1981 mondo film by Sheldon Renan and Leonard Schrader

- Japanese film poster

Japanese name
- Kanji: アメリカン・バイオレンス
- Literal meaning: American violence
Transcriptions
- Revised Hepburn: Amerikan baiorensu
- Directed by: Sheldon Renan
- Written by: Leonard Schrader; Chieko Schrader
- Produced by: Mataichirô Yamamoto; Leonard Schrader
- Narrated by: Chuck Riley (English); Yoshio Kaneuchi (Japanese)
- Cinematography: Robert Charlton; Tom Hurwitz; Willy Kurant; Peter Smokler
- Edited by: Lee Percy
- Music by: W. Michael Lewis; Mark Lindsay
- Production companies: Filmlink International; Towa Production Company
- Distributed by: Toho-Towa (Japan); Golden Harvest (International)
- Release date: September 5, 1981
- Running time: 115 minutes (Japan); 95 minutes (International)
- Countries: Japan; United States
- Language: English
- Box office: ¥670 million

The Killing of America, released in Japan as Violence USA (Japanese: アメリカン・バイオレンス, Hepburn: Amerikan baiorensu; "American violence"), is a 1981 mondo film directed by Sheldon Renan and written by Leonard and Chieko Schrader. The film was premiered in New York City in February 1982 and was shown at the 2013 Fantasia Festival.

== Synopsis ==
The Killing of America focuses on what the director feels is the decline of the United States. It features interviews from Ed Dorris, a retired sergeant of the Los Angeles Sheriff's Department, as well as Los Angeles County Coroner Thomas Noguchi. The documentary also shows several interviews with convicted killers such as Sirhan Sirhan as well as footage of murders and news broadcasts. It connects the beginning of America's woes with the assassination of John F. Kennedy and posits that hope of recovery was snuffed out when Robert F. Kennedy was assassinated in 1968 (the film features footage from the Zapruder film and news footage from the night that Robert Kennedy was killed). According to the film the 1960s saw the rise of "sniper" mass murderers who were often white, well-adjusted people that killed people seemingly at random (exemplified in the film by the murders of Charles Whitman). The 1970s saw the rise of what the film calls "sex killers", serial killers such as Ted Bundy and John Wayne Gacy who also raped and sexually abused their victims. A section of the film also analyses the Cleveland Elementary School shooting in 1979, in which a 16-year-old teenager opened fire on a group of children and staff from her window opposite an elementary school in San Diego, injuring 9 people and killing the school's principal and a janitor.

The last part of the film goes over the murder of John Lennon and ends with footage from a Central Park vigil for the slain musician. The narrators' last lines are: "Two people were shot at this Central Park vigil. While you watched this movie, five more of us were murdered; one was the random killing of a stranger."

== Cast ==
- Chuck Riley as narrator
- Thomas Noguchi
- Sirhan Sirhan
- Elmer Wayne Henley
- Edmund Kemper

== Release history ==
The Killing of America was initially released in Japan in September 1981. It made its United States debut in New York City in February 1982 at The Public Theater but did not receive a commercial release in the United States. It did receive a home video release in Britain. The film received a wide release in Japan, where financial backers reportedly pressured Renan to add footage of peace vigils for John Lennon as a way to make the documentary less depressing. Years later the documentary would receive a 2013 North American release at Fantasia Festival in Canada. The Killing of America was released on DVD in February 2002 and re-released in October 2016 on Blu-ray.

== Reception ==
Critical reception for The Killing of America has been mixed. Allmovie gave the film 2 1/2 stars out of 5, remarking that "Rather than an in-depth study of the reasons for and effects of the rising murder rate in the U.S., the director has chosen to emphasize the violence and the need for gun control to help lower the appalling amount of mayhem that distinguishes the U.S. from its European counterparts." In contrast, in the book The Horror Film Mikita Brottman considered the film to be "one of the more thoughtful and fascinating examples of the mondo genre".

== See also ==
- Bowling for Columbine
- Taxi Driver – 1976 film written by Paul Schrader
