= Tora-san's Dream of Spring =

- Theatrical poster
- Directed by: Yoji Yamada
- Written by: Yoji Yamada; Leonard Schrader; Yoshitaka Asama; Tomio Kuriyama
- Starring: Kiyoshi Atsumi; Kyōko Kagawa
- Cinematography: Tetsuo Takaba
- Edited by: Iwao Ishii
- Music by: Naozumi Yamamoto
- Distributed by: Shochiku
- Release date: December 28, 1979
- Running time: 104 minutes
- Country: Japan
- Language: Japanese

Tora-san's Dream of Spring (男はつらいよ 寅次郎春の夢, Otoko wa Tsurai yo: Torajirō Haru no Yume) aka Torasan Dreams Springtime is a 1979 Japanese comedy film directed by Yoji Yamada. It stars Kiyoshi Atsumi as Torajirō Kuruma (Tora-san), and Kyōko Kagawa as his love interest or "Madonna". Tora-san's Dream of Spring is the twenty-fourth entry in the popular, long-running Otoko wa Tsurai yo series.

== Synopsis ==
Tora-san returns to his family's home in Shibamata, Tokyo, to find a large American peddler living in his room, leading to various conflicts. As Tora-san struggles through his love with the local Madonna (references?) the American admits to falling for Sakura. Ultimately the two men find they have more in common than they thought.

== Cast ==
- Kiyoshi Atsumi as Torajirō
- Herbert Edelman as Michael Jordan
- Chieko Baisho as Sakura
- Kyōko Kagawa as Keiko Takai
- Hiroko Hayashi as Megumi Takai
- Masami Shimojō as Kuruma Tatsuzō
- Chieko Misaki as Tsune Kuruma (Torajiro's aunt)
- Gin Maeda as Hiroshi Suwa
- Hayato Nakamura as Mitsuo Suwa
- HIroshi Inuzuka as Carpenter
- Hisao Dazai as Boss (Umetarō Katsura)
- Taiji Tonoyama
- Chishū Ryū as Gozen-sama

== Critical appraisal ==
Kiyoshi Atsumi was nominated for Best Actor at the Japan Academy Prize ceremony for his performances in Tora-san's Dream of Spring and the previous entry in the series, Tora-san, the Matchmaker (also 1979). Chieko Baisho was nominated for Best Supporting Actress for the same two films. Stuart Galbraith IV notes that the American influence on this film, in the writing and in the acting, and the amusing conflicts between US and Japanese culture portrayed in the film makes it a particularly good entry point in the series for non-Japanese audiences. The German-language site molodezhnaja gives Tora-san's Dream of Spring three and a half out of five stars.

== Availability ==
Tora-san's Dream of Spring was released theatrically on December 28, 1979. In Japan, the film was released on videotape in 1996, and in DVD format in 2005 and 2008.

== Bibliography ==
=== English ===
- "OTOKO WA TSURAI YO TORAJIRO HARU NO YUME (1979)". British Film Institute. Archived from the original on 2009-09-26.
- "OTOKO WA TSURAIYO -TORAJIRO HARU NO YUME". Complete Index to World Film.
- Otoko wa tsurai yo: Torajirô haru no yume (1979) at IMDb
- Galbraith IV, Stuart (2006-01-27). "Tora-san 24: Tora-san's Dream of Spring (Region 3)". DVD Talk.

=== German ===
- "Tora-San's Dream of Spring" (in German). www.molodezhnaja.ch.

=== Japanese ===
- 男はつらいよ 寅次郎春の夢 (1979) (in Japanese). allcinema.net.
- "男はつらいよ 寅次郎春の夢". Japanese Cinema Database (Agency for Cultural Affairs). Archived from the original on 2014-02-02.
- 男はつらいよ 寅次郎春の夢 (in Japanese). Japanese Movie Database.
- 男はつらいよ 寅次郎春の夢 (in Japanese). Kinema Junpo. Archived from the original on 2012-03-21.
