= Ronin (film) =

1998 film by John Frankenheimer

- Theatrical release poster
- Directed by: John Frankenheimer
- Screenplay by: J.D. Zeik; David Mamet (Note: Credited as Richard Weisz.)
- Story by: J.D. Zeik
- Produced by: Frank Mancuso Jr.
- Starring: Robert De Niro; Jean Reno; Natascha McElhone; Stellan Skarsgård; Sean Bean; Jonathan Pryce
- Cinematography: Robert Fraisse
- Edited by: Tony Gibbs
- Music by: Elia Cmiral
- Production companies: United Artists; FGM Entertainment
- Distributed by: MGM Distribution Co. (US and Canada); United International Pictures (International)
- Release dates: September 12, 1998 (Venice); September 25, 1998 (US)
- Running time: 121 minutes
- Country: United States
- Language: English
- Budget: $55 million
- Box office: $70.7 million

Ronin is a 1998 American action thriller film directed by John Frankenheimer and written by J.D. Zeik and David Mamet, the latter under the pseudonym Richard Weisz. It stars Robert De Niro, Jean Reno, Natascha McElhone, Stellan Skarsgård, Sean Bean and Jonathan Pryce. The film centers around a team of former special operatives hired to steal a mysterious, heavily guarded briefcase while navigating a maze of shifting loyalties. The film was praised for its realistic car chases in Nice and Paris.

Frankenheimer signed to direct Zeik's screenplay, which Mamet rewrote in 1997 to expand De Niro's role and develop plot details. The film was photographed by Robert Fraisse in his native France from November 3, 1997, to March 3, 1998. Professional race car drivers coordinated and performed the vehicle stunts, and Elia Cmiral scored the film, his first for a major studio.

Ronin premiered at the 1998 Venice Film Festival before its general release on September 25. Critics were generally positive about the film's action, casting and technical aspects, while the plot attracted criticism. The film underperformed at the box office, grossing $70.7 million on a $55 million budget. Ronin, Frankenheimer's last well-received feature film, was considered to be a return to form for the director. Film critic and historian Stephen Prince called the film Frankenheimer's "end-of-career masterpiece". The car chases, which were favorably compared with those in Bullitt and The French Connection, were included on several media outlets' lists as among the best depicted on film.

== Plot ==
At a bistro in Montmartre, IRA operative Deirdre meets with two Americans, Sam and Larry, and a Frenchman, Vincent. She takes them to a warehouse where Englishman Spence and German Gregor are waiting. Conversations among the men reveal that they are former government and military agents who have become mercenaries. Deirdre briefs the group on their mission: to attack a heavily armed convoy and steal a large, metallic briefcase, whose content is never revealed.

The team's first preparation task is to acquire firearms, which turns into an ambush; the team survives and gets the weapons, having escaped from the police. Deirdre meets with her handler, Seamus O'Rourke, who tells her that the Russian mafia is bidding on the briefcase and that the team must intervene to prevent them from winning. Spence is exposed as a fraud by Sam; he gets dismissed by Deirdre, and the others continue their mission.

Sam takes pictures of the case while at a posh hotel with Deirdre. The next day, the team successfully ambushes the convoy at Villefranche-sur-Mer and pursues the survivors to Nice. During the gunfight, Gregor steals the case and replaces it with explosives in an attempt to sabotage the others. He attempts to sell it to the Russians, but his contact double crosses him; Gregor kills the contact and has Mikhi – the Russian mobster in charge of the deal – agree to another meeting. The team tracks Gregor through one of Sam's old contacts and corners him in the Arles Amphitheatre during his meeting with two of Mikhi's henchmen. Sam chases Gregor, who flees but is caught by Seamus.

Deirdre and Vincent confront the pair, prompting a shootout. Sam kills one, but is injured by a ricochet from the other, killed by Vincent. Seamus kills Larry and escapes with a reluctant Deirdre and the captured Gregor. Vincent takes Sam to a villa owned by his close friend Jean-Pierre. After removing the bullet and letting Sam recuperate, Jean-Pierre compares Sam's situation to the tale of the 47 Ronin. Vincent asks Jean-Pierre to help them locate Gregor and the Irish operatives.

In Paris, Gregor is persuaded through violent interrogation to return the case to Seamus and Deirdre. After retrieving it from a post office, they are pursued by Sam and Vincent in a high-speed chase. Vincent shoots out their tire, sending their car off an overpass and into a construction site. Gregor escapes with the case while road workers rescue Deirdre and Seamus from the burning vehicle. Doubtful of where to go next, Sam and Vincent agree to track down the Russians after discovering that the decoy case which Gregor used in his theft of the original is used for carrying ice skates; one of Jean-Pierre's contacts informs them that the Russians may be involved with figure-skater (and Mikhi's girlfriend) Natacha Kirilova, who is performing at Le Zénith.

During Natacha's show, Mikhi meets with Gregor, who says that a sniper in the arena will shoot Natacha if Mikhi betrays him. Mikhi kills Gregor and takes the case, allowing Natacha to be killed by the sniper. Amid the ensuing chaos from Natacha's shooting, Sam and Vincent leave the arena in time to see Seamus kill Mikhi and steal the case. Sam and Vincent split up; Vincent pursues Seamus but is wounded in a gunfight. Sam finds Deirdre waiting in a getaway car and convinces her to leave, after mentioning that he is still in the CIA and after Seamus, not the case. As she drives away, Seamus runs back in the arena as Sam gives chase. Seamus threatens to execute a hostage, releases her, then ambushes Sam, but is killed by Vincent.

Sam and Vincent have coffee in the bistro where they first met. A radio broadcast announces that a peace agreement between Sinn Féin and the British government has been reached, partially as a result of Seamus's murder. Sam keeps glancing at the door as patrons enter, but Vincent convinces Sam that Deirdre will not be coming back. They shake hands and part ways, but not before Vincent asks what was in the case. Sam replies that he does not remember. Sam drives off with his CIA contact as Vincent pays the bill and leaves.

== Cast ==
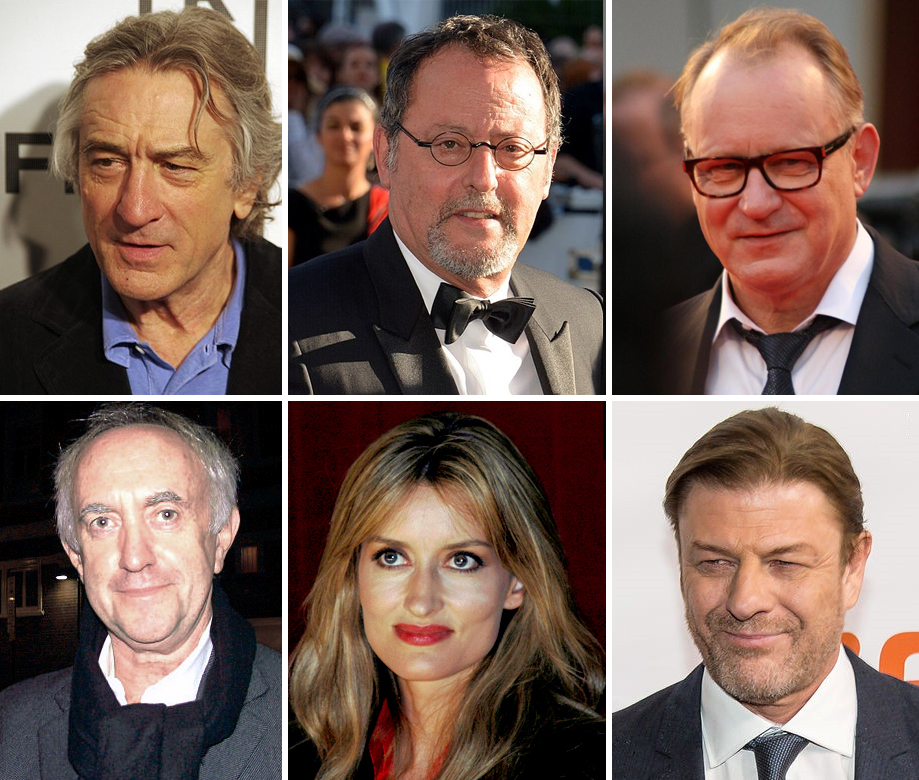
Top-billed cast of Ronin: (clockwise from top left) Robert De Niro, Jean Reno, Stellan Skarsgård, Sean Bean, Natascha McElhone and Jonathan Pryce

- Robert De Niro as Sam, a CIA agent undercover as ex-CIA turned mercenary. According to director John Frankenheimer, De Niro "was always dream casting" for the film.
- Jean Reno as Vincent, a French mercenary hired as a fixer who befriends Sam. Frankenheimer sought to establish the friendship between Reno's and De Niro's characters, which he considered pivotal to the story, and wanted to strengthen the off-screen bond between the actors.
- Natascha McElhone as Deirdre, an IRA operative who is commissioned to steal a briefcase by Seamus O'Rourke. An on-set dialect coach helped McElhone speak with a Northern Ireland accent. McElhone said she was thrilled to play the role because she portrayed a character that moved the action forward.
- Stellan Skarsgård as Gregor, a German computer specialist formerly associated with the KGB. A fan of Skarsgård, Frankenheimer praised the Swedish actor for "bring[ing] so much to the role". Skarsgård suggested Gregor had been abandoned by his wife and son, for which he became "quite suicidal and cold".
- Sean Bean as Spence, an Englishman who purports to be a firearms specialist formerly associated with the SAS. During production, Frankenheimer did not know what the future held for the character and considered having him killed off-screen after the team drives out of the warehouse, or snatched from a Paris street into a van driven by the IRA. Ultimately, he had Spence dismissed from the team. Bean described the character as egotistic and "a little bit out of his depth".
- Jonathan Pryce as Seamus O'Rourke, a rogue IRA operative in pursuit of the case through Deirdre. Like McElhone, the Welshman Pryce was coached to hone his Northern Irish accent.
- Skipp Sudduth as Larry, another American and the team's designated driver. Sudduth, who had appeared in Frankenheimer's George Wallace (1997), performed most of his character's driving stunts.
- Michael Lonsdale as Jean-Pierre, Vincent's friend and colleague whose pastime is creating miniatures. Frankenheimer intended to make the character a miniature artist, partially due to his own love of creating miniatures. The film was Lonsdale's third collaboration with Frankenheimer.
- Jan Triska as the dapper gent, the first Russian to try and kill Gregor for the case
- Féodor Atkine as Mikhi, a Russian mobster who is trying to buy the case.
- Katarina Witt as Natacha Kirilova, a Russian Olympic and World Champion figure skater. In real life, Witt is an Olympic and World Champion figure-skater who represented East Germany and later Germany.

== Production ==
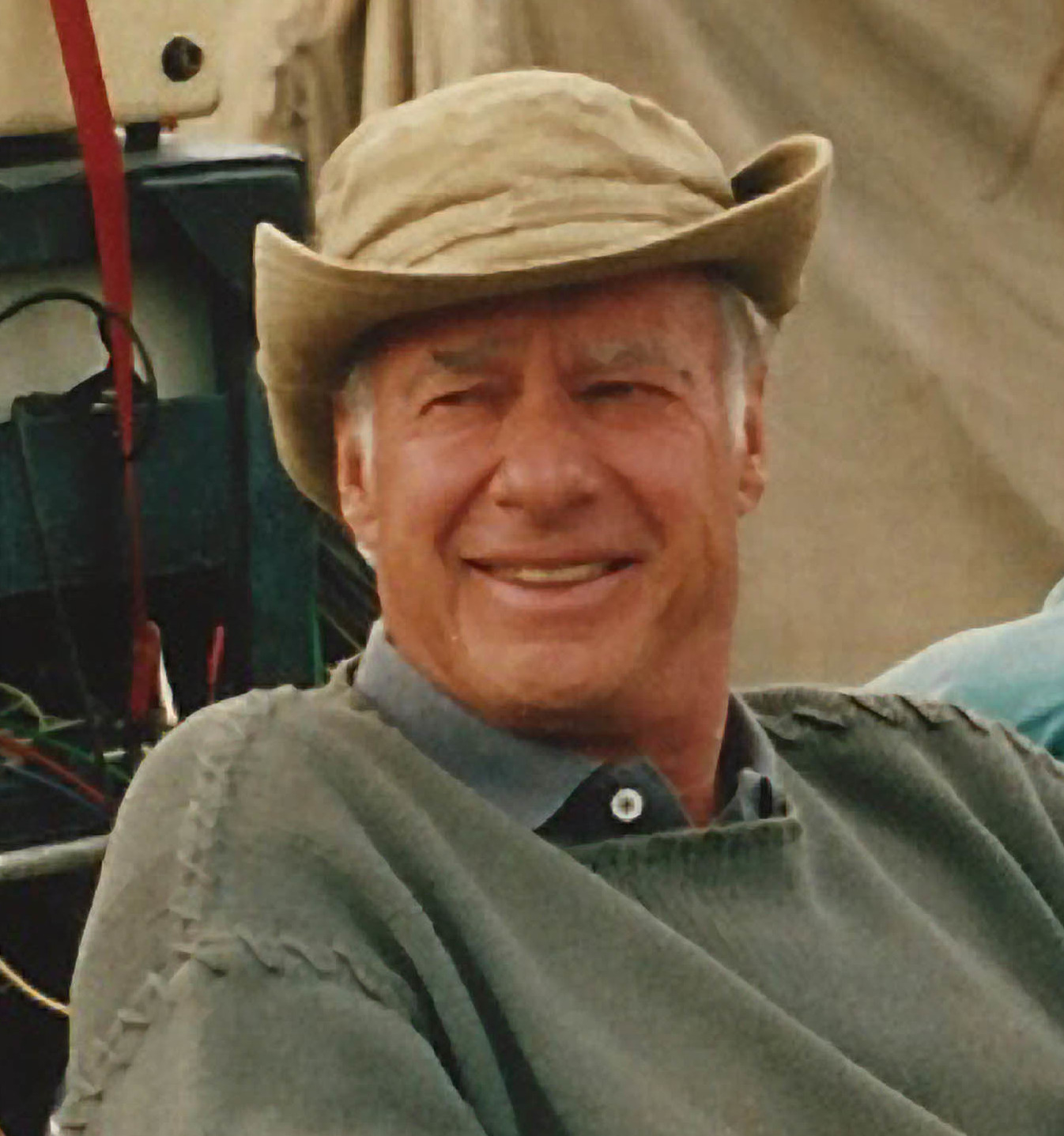
Ronin is the penultimate feature film of director John Frankenheimer (pictured in 1995), followed by Reindeer Games.

In July 1997, Variety reported that Frankenheimer had signed to direct Ronin, making it his fifth picture for United Artists. Frankenheimer told the magazine that he chose the project because it had a "very good script" and was "the kind of movie I'd love to go see ... What I like is, it's a character-driven action picture, and I have done those before, with Black Sunday and French Connection II. It's not one of these CGI pictures, it's a film about people. It's not bigger than life, which I don't relate to that much."

He also saw it as an opportunity to apply his broad knowledge and understanding of France, especially Paris, where he resided for many years. He added, "I would not have been able to do the film nearly as well anywhere else." His films The Train (1964), Grand Prix (1966), Impossible Object (1973) and French Connection II (1975) were shot in France.

Many of Ronin's principal crew members had worked with Frankenheimer on television films; editor Tony Gibbs on George Wallace, set designer Michael Z. Hanan on George Wallace and The Burning Season (1994), and costume designer May Routh on Andersonville (1996). Frankenheimer chose French cinematographer Robert Fraisse to help him achieve the look and style that he wanted for the film. Fraisse impressed Frankenheimer with his work on the police thriller Citizen X (1995), which persuaded the director to believe that Fraisse could handle the more-than-2,000 setups that he planned for Ronin. Frank Mancuso Jr. served as the film's producer.

According to Frankenheimer, French authorities helped him circumvent a strict Paris ordinance that prohibited film productions from firing guns in the city. This was enacted because many civilians had been complaining about the gunfire noise produced by film shoots. Additional factors influenced the decision; officials' desire for an American action film like Ronin, few of which had been filmed there since the law was passed, to be filmed in Paris, and the desire to boost France's reputation as a filming location.

=== Screenplay ===
Writer John David Zeik, a newcomer to film, conceived the idea for Ronin after reading James Clavell's novel Shōgun at age 15. It gave him background information on rōnin (masterless samurai), which he incorporated into a screenplay years later. On choosing France as the story's key location, Zeik said, "Many years later in Nice, the location of one of the key set pieces of the story, I stared into the sun and saw the silhouettes of five heavily armed gendarmes crossing the Promenade des Anglais. That image made me realize that I wanted to set the film in France."

Accounts differ regarding the screenplay's authorship. According to Zeik's attorney, playwright David Mamet was hired shortly before production to expand De Niro's role and add a female love interest. Although Mamet rewrote several scenes, his contributions were minor, according to Zeik's account. Frankenheimer said that Mamet's contributions were more significant. The studio submitted a request that "The credits should read: 'Story by J.D. Zeik, screenplay by David Mamet.' We didn't shoot a line of Zeik's script." Frankenheimer subsequently retracted this in a September 1998 open letter published in Variety, writing that "J.D. Zeik is unequivocally entitled to the first position screenwriting credit as well as the sole story credit he was awarded by the WGA ... [He] deserves recognition for his significant contribution to this film, and I am proud to have worked with him." When he learned that he would have to share credit with Zeik, Mamet insisted on being credited with the pseudonym Richard Weisz because he had earlier decided to attach his name only to projects for which he was the sole writer.

=== Filming and cinematography ===
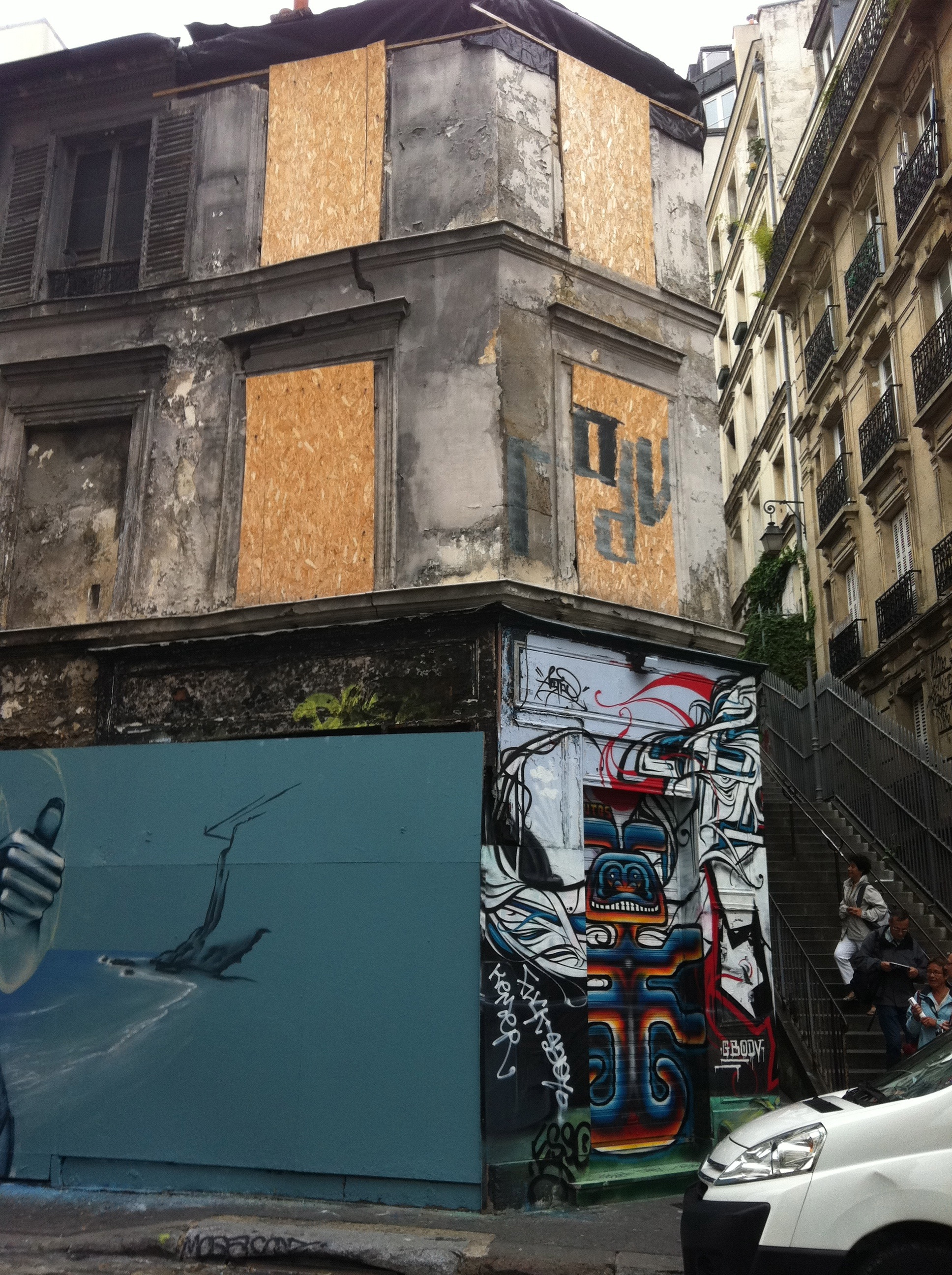
Facade of a Montmartre bistro in 2011. Because the building was empty, the crew constructed an interior set seen from the stairs.

Ronin was produced on a budget of $55 million (equivalent to $101.2 million in 2025). Principal photography lasted for 78 days, beginning on November 3, 1997, in an abandoned workshop at Aubervilliers. Scenes at Porte des Lilas and the historic Arles Amphitheatre were filmed in November; after which the crew filmed at the Hotel Majestic in Cannes, La Turbie and Villefranche.

Production was suspended for Christmas on December 19 and resumed on January 5, 1998, at Épinay, where the crew built two interior sets on sound stages; one for the bistro in Montmartre and another for the rural farmhouse, both of which also have exterior location shots. The climactic scene with a panicked crowd at Le Zénith required approximately 2,000 extras who were supervised by French casting director Margot Capelier. Filming concluded at La Défense on March 3, 1998.

Because there were no second unit director and camera operator to film the action scenes, Frankenheimer and cinematographer Robert Fraisse supervised them for an additional 30 days after the main unit finished filming. The first major car-chase scene was shot in La Turbie and Nice; the rest were filmed in areas of Paris, including La Défense and the Pont du Garigliano. Scenes set in a road tunnel were filmed at night because it was impossible to block tunnel traffic during the day. The freeway chase, in which the actors dodge oncoming vehicles, was filmed in four hours on a closed road.

Frankenheimer's affinity for deep depth of field led him to shoot the film entirely with wide-angle lenses ranging in focal length from 18 to 35 mm using the common top Super 35 format, both of which allow more of the scene to be included in each shot, as well as the freedom to reframe the movie for Full Screen presentation.

The director also avoided bright primary colors to preserve a first-generation-of-film quality. He advised the actors and extras not to wear bright colors and had the film processed with Deluxe's Color Contrast Enhancement (CCE), "a silver-retention method of processing film that deepens blacks, reduces color, and heightens the visible appearance of film grain". Fraisse said that he used a variety of cameras, including Panaflexes for dialogue scenes, and Arriflex 435s and 35-IIIs for the car chases, to facilitate Frankenheimer's demands. Steadicam, a camera stabilizer used for half of the shoot, was operated by the director's longtime collaborator David Crone. According to Frankenheimer, 2,200 shots were filmed.

=== Stunts ===
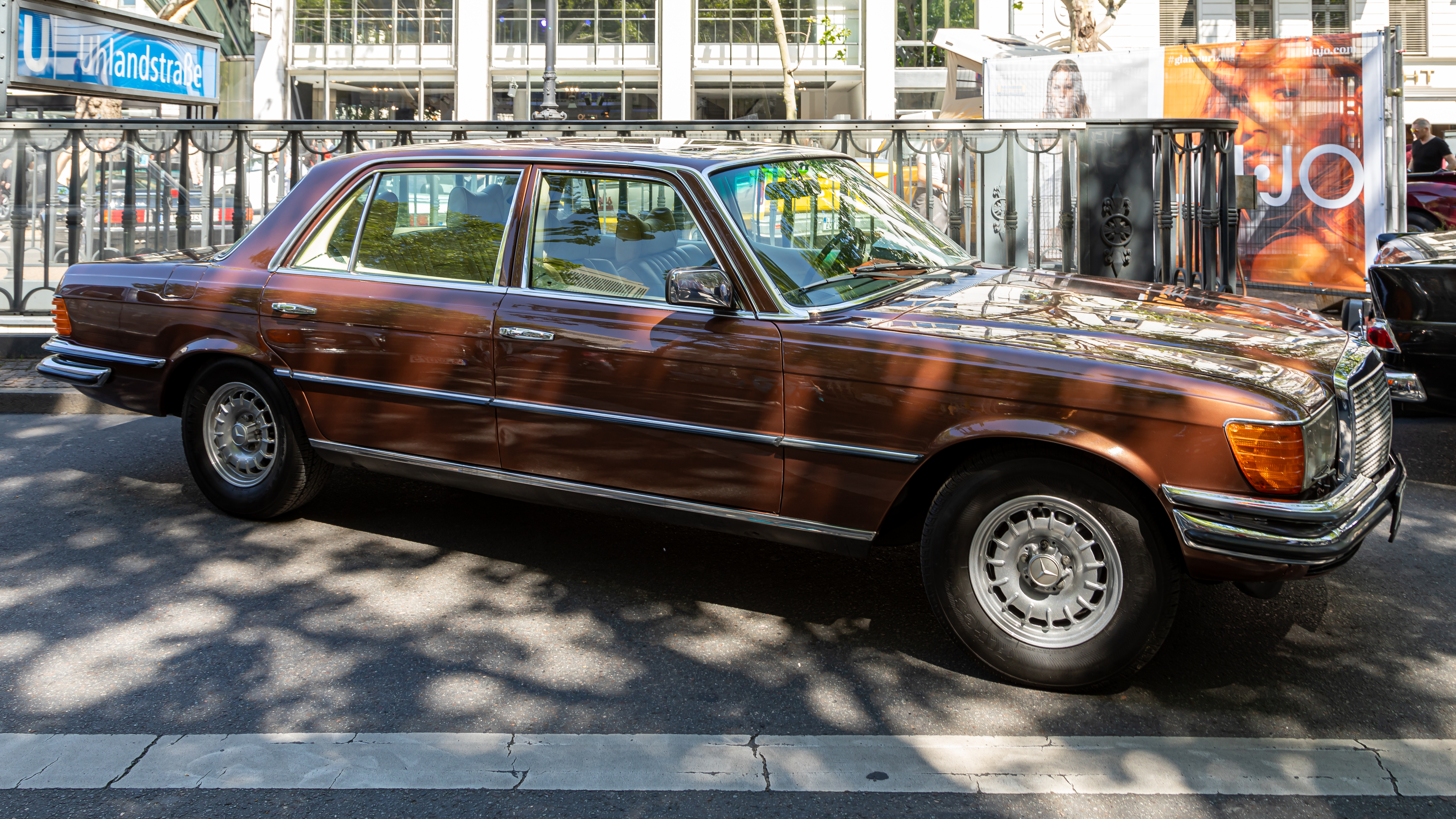
The Mercedes-Benz 450SEL 6.9 was Frankenheimer's favorite Mercedes model due to its appearance and "great, big powerful engine", and he used it as the protagonist's car in Ronin's first major car chase.

Frankenheimer avoided using special effects in the car-chase scenes, previsualizing them with storyboards, and used the same camera mounts as those used on Grand Prix. The actors were placed inside the cars while being driven at up to 100 mph (160 km/h) by Formula One driver Jean-Pierre Jarier and high-performance drivers Jean-Claude Lagniez and Michel Neugarten. The actors had enrolled at a high-performance driving school before production began. According to Lagniez, the car-stunt coordinator, it was a priority not to cheat the speed by adjusting the frame rate. He said, "When you do, it affects the lighting. It is different at 20 frames than at 24 frames." However, Fraisse said, "Sometimes, but not very often, we did shoot at 22 frames per second, or 21." Point-of-view shots from cameras mounted below the cars' front fender were used to deliver a heightened sense of speed.

For the final chase scene, which used 300 stunt drivers, the production team bought four BMW 535is and five Peugeot 406s; (Note: In the DVD commentary, Frankenheimer says four BMWs and five Peugeots were purchased for the chase scene, namely the BMW 535i and Peugeot 406.) one of each was cut in half and towed by a Mercedes-Benz 500 E while the actors were inside them. Right-hand drive versions of the cars were also purchased; a dummy steering wheel was installed on the left side while the stunt drivers drove the speeding vehicles. The final chase had very little music because Frankenheimer thought that music and sound effects do not blend well. Sound engineer Mike Le Mare recorded all of the film's cars on a racetrack, subsequently mixing them in post-production.

Frankenheimer refused to film the gunfights in slow motion, believing that on-screen violence should be depicted in real time. Mick Gould, the film's technical advisor and a former instructor in the advanced training wings of the Special Air Service, trained the cast in weapons-handling and guerilla military tactics. The physical stunts were coordinated by Joe Dunne.

=== Alternative endings ===
Frankenheimer filmed two additional versions of the film's ending. In the first, Deirdre waits on the stairs next to the bistro and considers joining Sam and Vincent. Deciding against it, she walks up the stairs. As she gets into her car, IRA men drag her into a van and call her a traitor; it is implied that she is later killed. Sam and Vincent, unaware of Deidre's abduction, finish their conversation and depart. Although Frankenheimer said that the test audience "hated" the ending because they did not want to see Deirdre die, he thought that it "really worked".

In the second ending, Deirdre walks to her car after Sam and Vincent leave the bistro. This ending was also rejected because it verged on being "too Hollywood", hinting at a sequel. Frankenheimer yielded to the test audience's response with a compromise ending, saying that "with the tremendous investment MGM/UA had in this movie, you have to kind of listen to the audience".

=== Music ===
Jerry Goldsmith was originally commissioned to compose the score for Ronin but left the project. Metro-Goldwyn-Mayer Executive Vice-President for Music Michael Sandoval assembled an A-list to replace Goldsmith.

From Sandoval's three choices, Frankenheimer hired Czech composer Elia Cmíral, who said that he "was far away from being even a 'B' composer at that time". Cmíral attended a private screening of the film's final version and considered its main theme, which, at Frankenheimer's behest, would incorporate qualities of "sadness, loneliness, and heroism". To achieve this, Cmíral performed with the duduk, an ancient, double-reed woodwind flute that originated in Armenia. Cmíral sent a demonstration to Frankenheimer, who "loved" it, and was signed as the film's composer. Cmíral's piece, "Ronin Theme", is used for the opening scenes.

Cmíral's score for Ronin, his first for a major film studio, was recorded in seven weeks at CTS Studio in London. It was orchestrated and conducted by Nick Ingman, edited by Mike Flicker, and recorded and mixed by John Whynot. Varèse Sarabande released the soundtrack album on CD in September 1998. For AllMusic, Jason Ankeny rated the album 4½ out of 5, and called it a "profoundly visceral listening experience, illustrating an expert grasp of pacing and atmosphere".

== Reception ==
=== Box office ===
Ronin had its world premiere at the 1998 Venice Film Festival on September 12, 1998, before a wide release on September 25. Ronin fared moderately well at the box office; it was the second-highest-grossing film in the United States during its opening weekend, grossing $12.6 million and ranking behind the action-comedy Rush Hour's $21.2 million, at 2,643 locations. The film dropped to fifth place on its second weekend and to seventh on its third, grossing $7.2 million and $4.7 million, respectively, at 2,487 locations. It dropped further until its sixth weekend, when it grossed $1.1 million (13th place) at 1,341 locations. In the United Kingdom, Ronin made $1.4 million in its opening weekend, ranking third behind Antz and Blade. For its first weekend in Australia, it opened in second place below Practical Magic, collecting $1.3 million. The film ended its theatrical run with a gross of $41.6 million in the U.S. and Canada, and $70.7 million worldwide. Ronin was 1998's 11th-highest-grossing R-rated film.

Audiences polled by CinemaScore gave the film an average grade of "C+" on an A+ to F scale.

=== Critical response ===
Critical reception to Ronin was favorable; critics praised its ensemble cast, with many singling out Robert De Niro. Todd McCarthy in Variety credited De Niro with sustaining the film, but Lisa Alspector from the Chicago Reader disagreed.

The film's action scenes, particularly the car chases, were generally praised. Janet Maslin in The New York Times called them "nothing short of sensational". These scenes were criticized by The Washington Post for their length, and by McCarthy for their excessive jump cuts.

Robert Fraisse's cinematography was routinely praised. Michael Wilmington in the Chicago Tribune called it superficially attractive and entertaining. Although the plot was criticized by the Chicago Reader as dull and The Washington Post as derivative, Wilmington called it a "familiar but taut tale". Some reviewers singled out as one of the film's best the espionage scene in which De Niro and Natascha McElhone pose as tourists and photograph their targets at a Cannes hotel.

Critics also evaluated Frankenheimer because the broad acclaim that he received with the political thriller The Manchurian Candidate (1962) had established him as a director. Many said that he was influenced by the works of fellow filmmaker and close friend Jean-Pierre Melville, particularly Melville's neo-noir film Le Samouraï (1967), but McCarthy wrote that Ronin lacks Melville's "world-weary, existential ennui".

The film was considered a return to form for Frankenheimer, whose Emmy Awards for the television films Against the Wall (1994), The Burning Season, Andersonville and George Wallace had resurrected his career after it had lost momentum during the 1970s and 1980s due to the director's alcohol addiction. Ronin was Frankenheimer's last well-received feature film. Wilmington called it the director's best theatrical film in decades despite lacking The Manchurian Candidate's "blazing invention", and Stephen Prince called the film his "end-of-career masterpiece". Prince wrote:

With Ronin, Frankenheimer vindicated his cinematic talents and aesthetic preferences. The film is stylistically bonded with the principles of his work as found in the earliest and best period of his career. Its aesthetic of realism places it with Grand Prix, The Train, and The Gypsy Moths, and its minimalist conception of character and narrative detail bonds it to those productions as well. Frankenheimer had not lost his touch as a filmmaker, far from it. Ronin is smart, sharp, and witty, and it shows a greater facility for visual storytelling than most films made today, by younger directors, can muster.

== Post-release ==
=== Home media ===
In February 1999, MGM Home Entertainment released Ronin as a double-sided DVD that contains widescreen and full screen versions, both with Dolby Digital 5.1 sound. The DVD also contains the alternate ending and an audio commentary by John Frankenheimer, who discusses the film's production history. MGM released a special-edition DVD of the film in October 2004, and a two-disc collector's edition on May 9, 2006, both of which have additional cast and crew interviews.

The film was released on Blu-ray by MGM with its theatrical trailer on February 24, 2009. In August 2017, Arrow Video released a special-edition Blu-ray based on a 4K scan of the original camera negative that was supervised and approved by cinematographer Robert Fraisse. Arrow's Blu-ray also includes archival bonus features that appear on the MGM special-edition DVD, together with Fraisse talking about his early cinematography career and his involvement with Ronin.

On June 20, 2023, Kino Lorber released the film on Ultra HD Blu-ray, based on a new 4K scan of the film with HDR10 and Dolby Vision versions.

=== Cinematic analysis ===
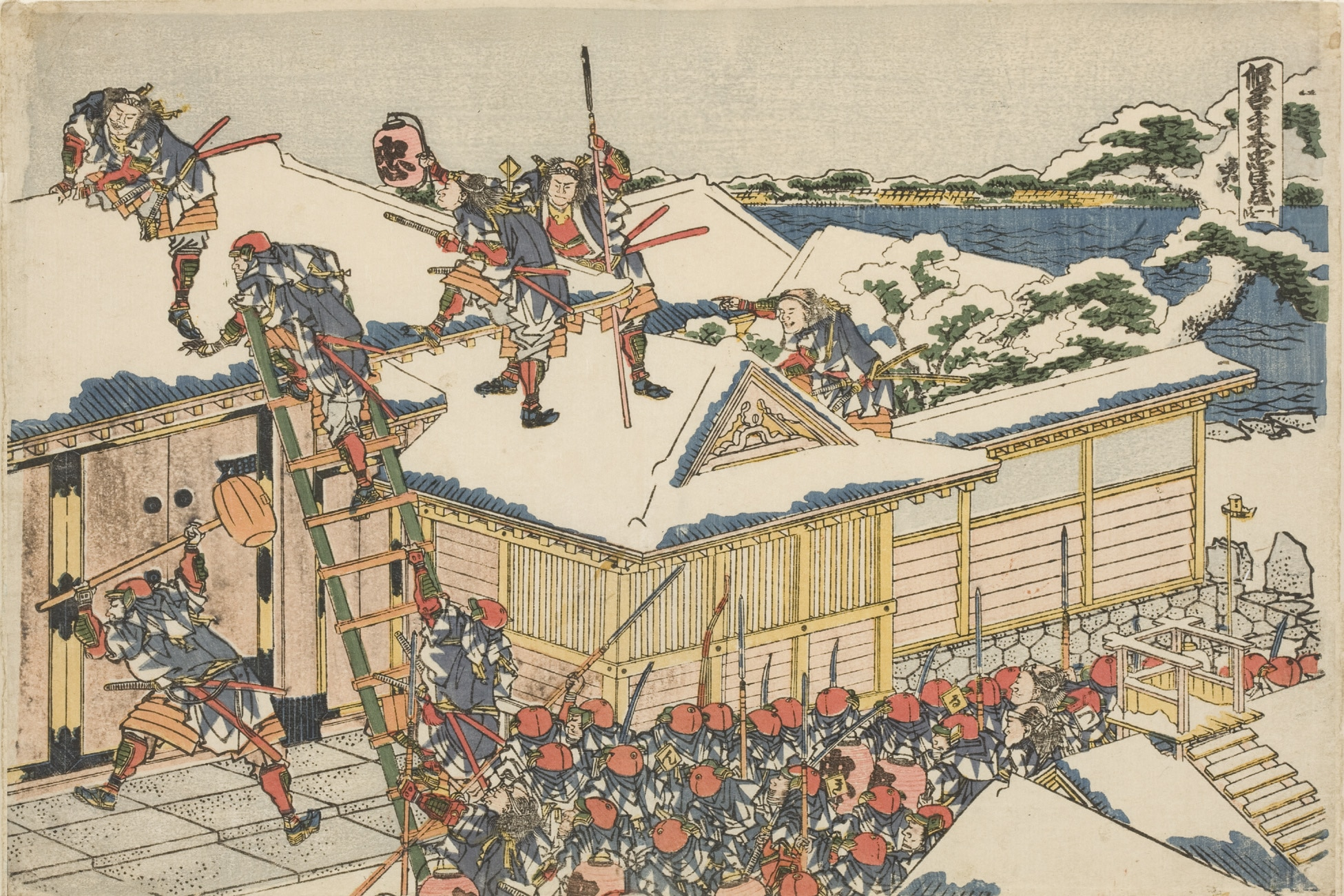
The 18th-century Japanese revenge of the forty-seven rōnin was the film's central metaphor.

The film's title is derived from the Japanese legend of rōnin, samurai whose leader was killed and left them with no one to serve, and roamed the countryside as mercenaries and bandits to regain a sense of purpose.

In Frankenheimer's film, the rōnin are former intelligence operatives who are unemployed at the end of the Cold War; devoid of purpose, they become highly-paid mercenaries. Michael Lonsdale's character elaborates on the analogy in an anecdote about the forty-seven rōnin told with miniatures, comparing the film's characters to the 18th-century rōnin of Japan.

In his essay "Action and Abstraction in Ronin", Stephen Prince wrote that the rōnin metaphor explores themes of "service, honor, and obligation to complex ways by showing that service may entail betrayal and that honor may be measured according to disparate terms". According to Stephen B. Armstrong, "Arguably Frankenheimer uses this story to highlight and contrast the moral and social weakness that characterize the band of rōnin in his film".

The film features a MacGuffin plot device in the form of a briefcase, the contents of which are important but unknown. Chicago Sun-Times critic Roger Ebert speculated that the Ronin briefcase might as well be containing the equally-mysterious briefcase from Quentin Tarantino's Pulp Fiction (1994), also a MacGuffin.

Michael Wilmington of the Chicago Tribune called Ronin an homage to The French Connection (1971), The Parallax View (1974) and Three Days of the Condor (1975); thriller films known for their lack of visual effects. Maitland McDonagh of TV Guide also compared the film to The Day of the Jackal (1973), and noted similarities between Ronin's opening scene and that of Tarantino's Reservoir Dogs (1992), in which a group of professional killers have not met before assembling. According to Armstrong, the film's plot observes the conventions of heist films.

Frankenheimer employed a hyperrealistic aesthetic in his films "to make them look realer than real, because reality by itself can be very boring", and saw them as having a tinge of semi-documentary. He credited Gillo Pontecorvo's The Battle of Algiers (1966), a film that he considered flawless and more influential than any other he had seen, with inspiring this style. According to Prince, "Frankenheimer's success at working in this realist style, avoiding special effects trickery, places the car chase in Ronin in the same rarefied class as the celebrated chase in Bullitt (1968)."

The director credited the Russian film The Cranes Are Flying (1957) with inspiring invisible cuts in Ronin. On the film's DVD audio commentary, Frankenheimer notes a wipe during the opening scenes made by two extras walking across the frame, which becomes a tracking shot of Jean Reno entering the bistro. His intention for the cut was to conceal the fact that the bistro's interior was a set; its exterior was filmed on location.

== Legacy ==
=== Modern reception ===
On the review aggregator website Rotten Tomatoes, 70% of 73 critics' reviews are positive, with an average rating of 6.4/10. The website's consensus reads: "Ronin earns comparisons to The French Connection with strong action, dynamic road chase scenes, and solid performances." In 2019, Rotten Tomatoes' Alex Vo ranked Ronin No. 101 on his list of the "140 Essential Action Movies To Watch Now". Metacritic, which uses a weighted average, assigned the film a score of 67 out of 100, based on 23 critics, indicating "generally favorable" reviews.

Ronin's car chases were included on several media outlets' lists of the best depicted on film, including CNN (#2), Time (#12), Fandango (#6), Complex (#25), The Daily Telegraph (#10), PopMatters (#9), IGN (#9), Screen Rant (#8), Business Insider (#3), Consequence of Sound (#6), and on Collider.

Some critics have said that the chase scenes in Mission: Impossible – Fallout (2018) were influenced by those in Ronin. Screen Rant ranked Ronin #1 on its list of the "12 Best Action Movies You've Never Heard Of". In 2014, Time Out polled several film critics, directors, actors and stunt actors about their top action films; Ronin placed #72 on the list. Paste magazine ranked the film #10 on its list of the "25 Best Movies of 1998". Ronin is included in the film reference book 101 Action Movies You Must See Before You Die.

In 2025, The Hollywood Reporter listed Ronin as having the best stunts of 1998.

=== Video games ===
Ronin influenced the conception of the action video games Burnout (Note: Alex Ward, the creator of Burnout, said the inspiration for the racing game was the DVD version's 15th chapter, which is titled "Crashing the Case," and shows a crash between two opposing cars.) and Alpha Protocol.

== Bibliography ==
- Armstrong, Stephen B. (2008). Pictures About Extremes: The Films of John Frankenheimer. United States: McFarland & Company. ISBN 978-0-7864-3145-8.
- Crosse, Jesse (2006). The Greatest Movie Car Chases of All Time. United States: Motorbooks. ISBN 978-0-7603-2410-3.
- Pomerance, Murray; Palmer, R. Barton, eds. (2011). A Little Solitaire: John Frankenheimer and American Film. United States: Rutgers University Press. ISBN 978-0-8135-5059-6.
