= Hiroko Hayashi (singer) =

Japanese actress, singer and tarento (born 1959)

- Born: 16 October 1959 (age 67)
- Occupations: Actress, singer, tarento
- Spouse: Hisao Kurosawa (m. 1979–2003)
- Children: 3
- Relatives: Akira Kurosawa (father-in-law)

Hiroko Hayashi (林 寛子, Hayashi Hiroko; born 16 October 1959) is a Japanese actress, singer and tarento.

== Biography ==
Hiroko Hayashi made her TV-drama debut in Tabiji in 1965. She debuted as a singer in 1974.

In 1979, she married Hisao Kurosawa, a film producer whose father was Akira Kurosawa, but later they divorced. They have three children. She also has three grandchildren by her eldest daughter Yu Kurosawa (1982). Her height is 5′ 1″ (1.55 m).

== Filmography ==
Television

- Tabiji (1965)
- Akogare (1966)
- Kamen Rider (1971)
- Henshin Ninja Arashi (1972), Kasumi
- Kunitori Monogatari (1973), Akechi Tama
- Ultraman Mebius (2006), Keiko Kuze

Film

- Tora-san's Dream of Spring (1979), Megumi Takai

== Discography ==
=== Singles ===
#	Title	Release date/chart position
1	Hohoemi (ほほえみ); Debut single	1974-03-25 (#33)
2	Hirusagari No Yume (昼下がりの夢)	1974-06-25 (#71)
3	Kebyou No Jouzu Na Otokonoko (仮病の上手な男の子)	1974-09-25 (#70)
4	Shiroi Madobe (白い窓辺)	1975-01-10 (#-)
5	Higure Doki (日暮れどき)	1975-05-10 (#-)
6	Sutekina Lovely Boy (素敵なラブリーボーイ)	1975-09-10 (#31)
7	Come on Baby (カモン・ベイビー)	1976-01-10 (#51)
8	Kiken Gaippai (危険がいっぱい)	1976-03-25 (#61)
9	Kini Naruaitsu! (気になるあいつ!)	1976-08-10 (#88)
10	Watashi Ga Blue Nisomarutoki (私がブルーにそまるとき)	1977-01-25 (#67)
11	Koha O Togibanashi Janaikara (恋はお伽話じゃないから)	1977-04-25 (#-)
12	Marionette (マリオネット)	1977-08-25 (#-)
13	Fifty-Fifty (フィフティ・フィフティ)	1978-08-21 (#-)
14	Hare Nochi Kumori Soshite Aki (晴れのち曇りそして秋)	2003-11-21 (#-)
