= Joan Tewkesbury =

American actress

- Born: April 8, 1936 (age 90)
- Occupations: Film and television actress, director, and screenwriter

Joan Tewkesbury (born April 8, 1936) is an American film and television director, writer, producer, choreographer and actress. She had a long association with the celebrated director Robert Altman, writing the screenplays for Thieves Like Us (1974), and Nashville (1975), widely regarded as "Altman's masterpiece", and which earned her a nomination for the BAFTA Award for Best Screenplay.

== Early life ==
Tewkesbury began her career at age ten as a dancer in The Unfinished Dance with Margaret O'Brien and Cyd Charisse. One of her early television acting roles was in a guest appearance on the short-lived NBC drama It's a Man's World.

== Career ==
Tewkesbury collaborated with Altman on several of his films, including McCabe and Mrs. Miller (1971, as a script supervisor) and Thieves Like Us (1974, her first credit as a feature writer). She then wrote Nashville, which she had proposed to Altman prior to his filming of McCabe & Mrs. Miller; he became interested in the setting and sent Tewkesbury to Nashville in the fall of 1973 to observe the area and its citizenry. Tewkesbury's diary of her trip provided the basis for the screenplay, with many observations making it into the finished film, such as the highway pileup. Tewkesbury wrote and directed numerous hours of episodic television, including for Disney, HBO, CBS, TNT, and NBC. She has also directed off-Broadway, co-choreographed and directed for the Oregon Ballet Theatre and performed, written and directed for the Edinburgh Festival Fringe. Her play, The Retrospective, was presented at the Manhattan Theatre Source.

In 2011, Tewkesbury published her first novel, Ebba and the Green Dresses of Olivia Gomez in a Time of Conflict and War.

She has also taught screenwriting, at the University of Southern California, with her workshop “Designed Obstacles, Spontaneous Response” travelling throughout the United States, Israel, and Japan. Since 2003, Tewkesbury has lived in Tesuque, New Mexico.

== Filmography ==
Film

- Old Boyfriends (1979)

TV movies

- The Tenth Month (1979)
- The Acorn People (1981)
- Cold Sassy Tree (1989)
- Strangers (1992)
- Scattering Dad (1998)

TV series

- Elysian Fields (1989)
- Felicity
- The Guardian (2001)
