= Raquel Liberman =

Jewish Polish immigrant to Argentina, victim of human trafficking (1900–1935)

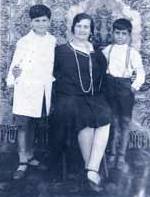
- Raquel Liberman in 1930
- Born: 10 July 1900; Berdichev, Russian Empire
- Died: 7 April 1935 (aged 34); Buenos Aires, Argentina
- Known for: Victim of human trafficking

Raquel Liberman (10 July 1900 – 7 April 1935) was a Polish-Jewish immigrant to Argentina, a victim of human trafficking. Her denouncement of her traffickers led to the breaking up of the Jewish human-trafficking network from Poland, Zwi Migdal, which in the early 20th century operated a worldwide white-slavery ring.

== Early life ==
Liberman was born on 10 July 1900 in Berdichev in the Kiev Governorate of the Russian Empire. According to the Jewish Women's Archive, she moved to Warsaw in Russian Poland with her family as a child. In 1919, she married Yaacov Ferber, a Warsaw tailor, according to Jewish rites. Ferber emigrated to Argentina and she followed him to Tapalqué, Buenos Aires province, with her two sons in 1922. Her husband died of tuberculosis soon after their arrival. Needing economic support and not knowing Spanish, Liberman left her children with a foster family and looked for a job in Buenos Aires. Liberman later kept the existence of her children a secret, and her children were unaware of her subsequent history.

== Slavery ==
It is unclear how Liberman got involved in the criminal network, as there are very few records of her early life, and she concealed parts of her personal history.

Unable to find work as seamstress, she was either forced into or voluntarily entered into prostitution, through a Jewish human trafficking network named Zwi Migdal, (previously "Varsovia"). One possibility is that her sister and brother-in-law belonged to the organization. This network worked in Europe under the semblance of a Jewish Mutual Aid Society which lured girls and young women to Argentina where they were exploited sexually. Exactly how it occurred is uncertain, but Liberman ended up working for a pimp named Jaime Cissinger, whom she paid for protection.

For at least four years Liberman was a captive of the human trafficking network. She managed to save money to buy her liberty, possibly with help from someone else. She opened a shop in Callao road but Zwi Migdal started to harass and threaten her to avoid her example being copied by other female captives. A member of the Zwi Migdal, José Salomón Korn, fooled her with a false marriage promise and married her in a faked Jewish ceremony. He then stole her savings and attempted to force her back into a brothel.

Liberman escaped a second time and on 31 December 1929 she denounced the Zwi Migdal to Inspector of Police Julio Alsogaray. Her judicial complaint was the first to publicly expose these criminal networks in Argentina and evolved into the dissolution of the human trafficking network.

== Complaint and Zwi Migdal persecution ==
After Liberman escaped the second time, she contacted Julio Alsogaray, a policeman with a reputation for integrity, and with him on 31 December 1929 filed a complaint in court. The commissary asked if she was determined to make her declaration to the magistrate and she affirmed: "I can only die once, I won't withdraw the complaint". The criminal court magistrate Manuel Rodríguez Ocampo called Liberman to testify. Her testimony brought to light the criminal organization's methods, where women were forcibly transported from one place to another, and constantly abused physically and psychologically to make them subservient and prevent them from denouncing the organization.

The magistrate ordered the detention of 108 members of the Zwi Migdal and the arrest of 334 fugitives on charges of corruption and conspiracy. The lengthy trial ended in September 1930, with 108 criminal convictions. "The very existence of the Zwi Migdal Organization directly threatens our society", Judge Ocampo wrote in his verdict, handing down long prison sentences.

During the investigation the complicity of the criminal organization with the federal police was uncovered. The magistrate's ruling was appealed. Despite Liberman's testimony, the appeals chamber magistrate only retained three members of the organization in custody, freeing its many other members. The appeals chamber magistrate justified this action by saying that only Liberman had testified (despite constant threats) whereas other victims did not.

However, the trial increased public awareness of Zwi Migdal, and led to its dissolution.

== Death ==
In 1934 Liberman applied for a visa to return to Poland. The trip never took place since several months later, on 7 April 1935, she died of thyroid cancer at the age of 34.

== Recognition ==
Raquel Liberman has been the inspiration for a number of authors. Nora Glickman's book The Jewish White Slave Trade and the Untold Story of Raquel Liberman is a historical account. Writer and poet Ilan Sheinfeld has also written an account of that time, The Tale of a Ring. Humberto Costantini died before he could complete a fictionalized account, Rapsodía de Raquel Liberman, which he had hoped would "justify [him] in the eyes of God". Carlos Luis Serrano wrote a play about her, Raquel Liberman: una historia de Pichincha. The novel THE THIRD DAUGHTER (HarperCollins, 2019) by Talia Carner is a penetrating look into early 20th-century sex-trafficking taking the cue from Sholem Aleichem's "The Man from Buenos Aires." Myrtha Shalom wrote the book La Polaca. Argentine-born film-maker Gabriela Bohm has produced a 30-minute documentary about her, entitled Raquel: a marked woman.

In Argentina, as of June 2010, the Raquel Liberman award was created to honor those who promote and protect the rights of survivors of violence against women.

== See also ==
- Sexual slavery
- Alfonse Pogrom
- Simon Rubinstein (pimp)
