= Michel Fano =

French musician (1929–2026)

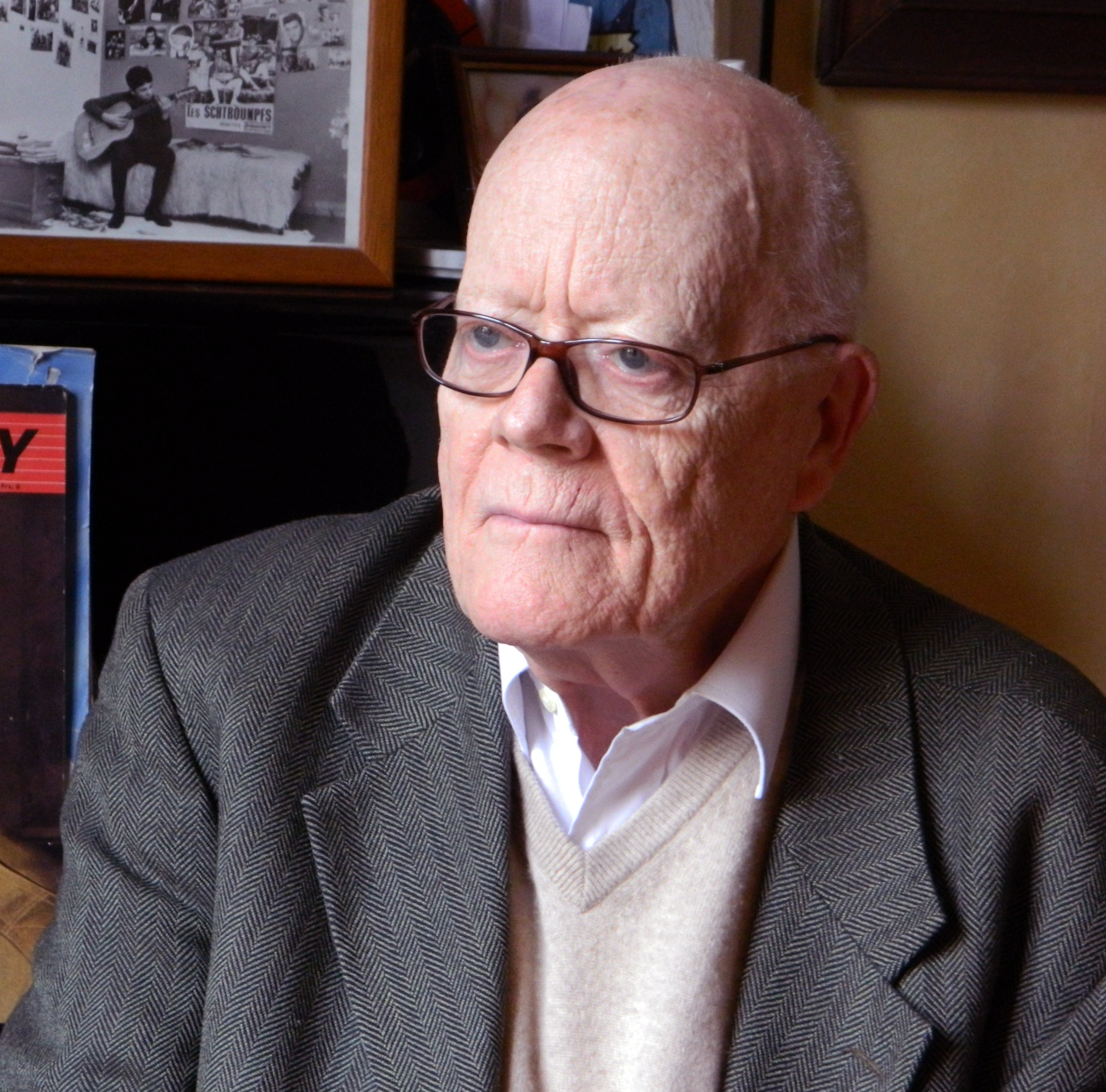
Fano in 2013

Michel Fano (9 December 1929 – 31 August 2026) was a French musician, composer, writer, filmmaker and sound designer.

== Life and career ==
Fano was born on 9 December 1929. He developed the concept of continuum sonore to describe the potential for a film's soundtrack to interact with its visual content. During the early 1950s, he was part of a generation of composers associated with the Darmstadt School, and was a lifelong friend of Pierre Boulez. From 1962 until 1975, he regularly collaborated with Alain Robbe-Grillet on cinematic projects, creating partitions sonores (or "sound-scores") for five of Robbe-Grillet's films.

Fano died in Buis-les-Baronnies on 31 August 2026, at the age of 96.

== Works ==
=== Compositions ===
The following are Fano's acknowledged compositions; numerous works of juvenilia and works-in-progress also exist.

- Sonate pour deux pianos (1952)
- Étude XV (Picc. Fl. Ob. Eh. Cl[E♭]. Cl. Bcl. 2Hn. Ptpt. 2Tpt. Sax. 2Vln. 2Va. 2Vlc. Cb) (1954, premiered 2021)
- La Chambre Secréte (Electronic music with text by Alain Robbe-Grillet)
- Fab V (piano solo, 1995)

=== Partitions sonores ===
- L'Immortelle (1963, dir. Alain Robbe-Grillet)
- Trans-Europ-Express (1966, dir. Alain Robbe-Grillet)
- L'homme qui ment (1968, dir. Alain Robbe-Grillet)
- L'éden et après (1970, dir. Alain Robbe-Grillet)
- Glissements progressifs du plaisir (1974, dir. Alain Robbe-Grillet)
