= N. a pris les dés... =

- DVD cover
- Directed by: Alain Robbe-Grillet
- Written by: Alain Robbe-Grillet
- Screenplay by: Alain Robbe-Grillet
- Produced by: Samy Halfon
- Starring: Sylvain Corthay; Catherine Jourdan; Richard Leduc; Lorraine Rainer; Pierre Zimmer; Ludovít Króne; Jarmila Koleničová; Juraj Kukura; Catherine Robbe-Grillet; Eva Luther
- Cinematography: Igor Luther
- Edited by: Bob Wade
- Music by: Michel Fano
- Release date: 1971
- Running time: 79 minutes
- Country: France
- Language: French

N. a pris les dés... (pronounced [ɛn a pʁi le de], French for "N. has taken the dice...") is a 1971 French experimental independent underground drama art film directed by Alain Robbe-Grillet.

== Production ==
Alain Robbe-Grillet had signed for a production of two separate films from the same shot, with different editings of the same scenes, so to create two totally different plots: the first was Eden and After, the second N. a pris les dés..., whose title is indeed an anagram of the other movie's original one (L'Éden et après). It tells the same story, but from the point of view of the male protagonist, who becomes the narrative voice, instead of the female protagonist, Violette (Catherine Jourdan).
