= Eden and After =

1970 film

- Theatrical release poster
- French: L'Eden et après
- Directed by: Alain Robbe-Grillet
- Story by: Alain Robbe-Grillet
- Produced by: Samy Halfon
- Starring: Catherine Jourdan; Pierre Zimmer; Juraj Kukura; Catherine Robbe-Grillet
- Cinematography: Igor Luther
- Edited by: Bob Wade
- Music by: Michel Fano
- Distributed by: Plan Film (France); Mundial Films (USA)
- Release date: 20 April 1970 (France)
- Running time: 100 minutes
- Countries: France; Czechoslovakia
- Languages: French; Slovak

Eden and After (French: L'Eden et après) is a 1970 French–Czechoslovak drama art film directed by French novelist and filmmaker Alain Robbe-Grillet. It was entered into the main competition of the 20th Berlin International Film Festival.

The film's plot follows a group of university students, led by the central character Violette, who engage in enigmatic rituals at a café called Eden. Instead of writing a detailed script for the film, Robbe-Grillet created a story through the composer Arnold Schoenberg's system for the twelve-tone technique and based the film's plot on the result. Since the project lacked a proper script, Robbe-Grillet had to hire relatively obscure actors for most of the roles.

== Plot ==
A group of university students meet after class at a café called Eden, where they perform enigmatic rituals and games—such as a simulated Russian roulette or pretending one of them has been poisoned to death. One evening an older stranger named Duchemin enters Eden and engages them in magic tricks. He asks them to pick up broken glass pieces with bare hands and heals the resulting cut wounds instantly, a trick he says he learned in Africa. He offers a drug he calls "fear powder", which one of the students, Violette, takes. She hallucinates, terrified by lurid visions of torture and murder, but soon bursts out laughing. She agrees to meet Duchemin later at night in an abandoned factory, where she gets lost upon arrival. After going through a series of hallucinatory visions, which includes a semen-like substance oozing from a pipe, she exits the factory next morning. Duchemin is found dead at the foot of a staircase overlooking the nearby canal. She finds a postcard from Tunisia in his pocket.

Returning home, she discovers that she has been robbed of a valuable painting. She leaves for Tunisia, where she meets Duchemin's doppelgänger named Dutchman and becomes his lover. A gang of thugs who seem like the students she was with at Eden kidnap her. Imprisoned and subjected to torture, she manages to free herself with the help of a doppelgänger of hers. Violette recovers the painting and finds Dutchman dead at the foot of a staircase by the sea, which reminds her of the place where she found Duchemin's body earlier.

Back home, Violette narrates that nothing has happened yet or perhaps everything was just a fantasy, hallucination, or premonitory dream of hers.

== Cast ==
- Catherine Jourdan as Violette
- Pierre Zimmer as Duchemin/Dutchman
- Richard Leduc as Marc-Antoine
- Lorraine Rainer as Marie-Eve
- Sylvain Corthay as Jean-Pierre
- Juraj Kukura as Boris
- Jarmila Koleničová (credited as Jarmila Kolenicová) as Sona
- Catherine Robbe-Grillet as "Foolish woman"
- François Gervai
- Ľudovít Kroner (credited as Ludwik Kroner) as Franc

Voice actors for the Slovak release

- Ida Rapaičová as Violette/Viola
- Slavo Drozd as Duchemin/Durman
- Božidara Turzonovová as Marie-Eve/Mária
- Ivan Krajíček as Marc-Antoine/Mikuláš
- Peter Mikulík as Jean-Pierre/Róbert

== Production ==
According to Robbe-Grillet, his imagination lacked colours and he was disinclined to make films in colour. All his films prior to Eden and After had been shot in black-and-white. However, after the commercial underperformance of The Man Who Lies (1968), he considered to quit filmmaking because he felt making films in black-and-white was no longer viable in the industry.

There was no detailed script for Eden and After. Robbe-Grillet created a story using the system Austrian-American composer Arnold Schoenberg used in his version of the twelve-tone technique, constructing the film's plot with ten sets of twelve themes arranged in a different order for each set. Robbe-Grillet described the result as a mixture of Alice's Adventures in Wonderland and Marquis de Sade's Justine, with certain components taken from the chivalric romance. With no written details to rely on, Robbe-Grillet had to discuss each shot and scene at depth with the film's cinematographer Igor Luther, which granted Luther considerable creative control over the film.

Most of the actors Robbe-Grillet hired for the film were relatively obscure since established actors in general would not work for a film project that had no proper script. The hired actors had been informed very little about the film before the production began, only that it was to be shot in Czechoslovakia and Djerba, a Tunisian island.
