= Fernanda Botelho =

Fernanda Botelho may refer to:

- Fernanda Botelho (writer) (1926–2007), Portuguese poet and author
- Fernanda Botelho (mathematician) (born 1957), American mathematician
