= Frank Verpillat =

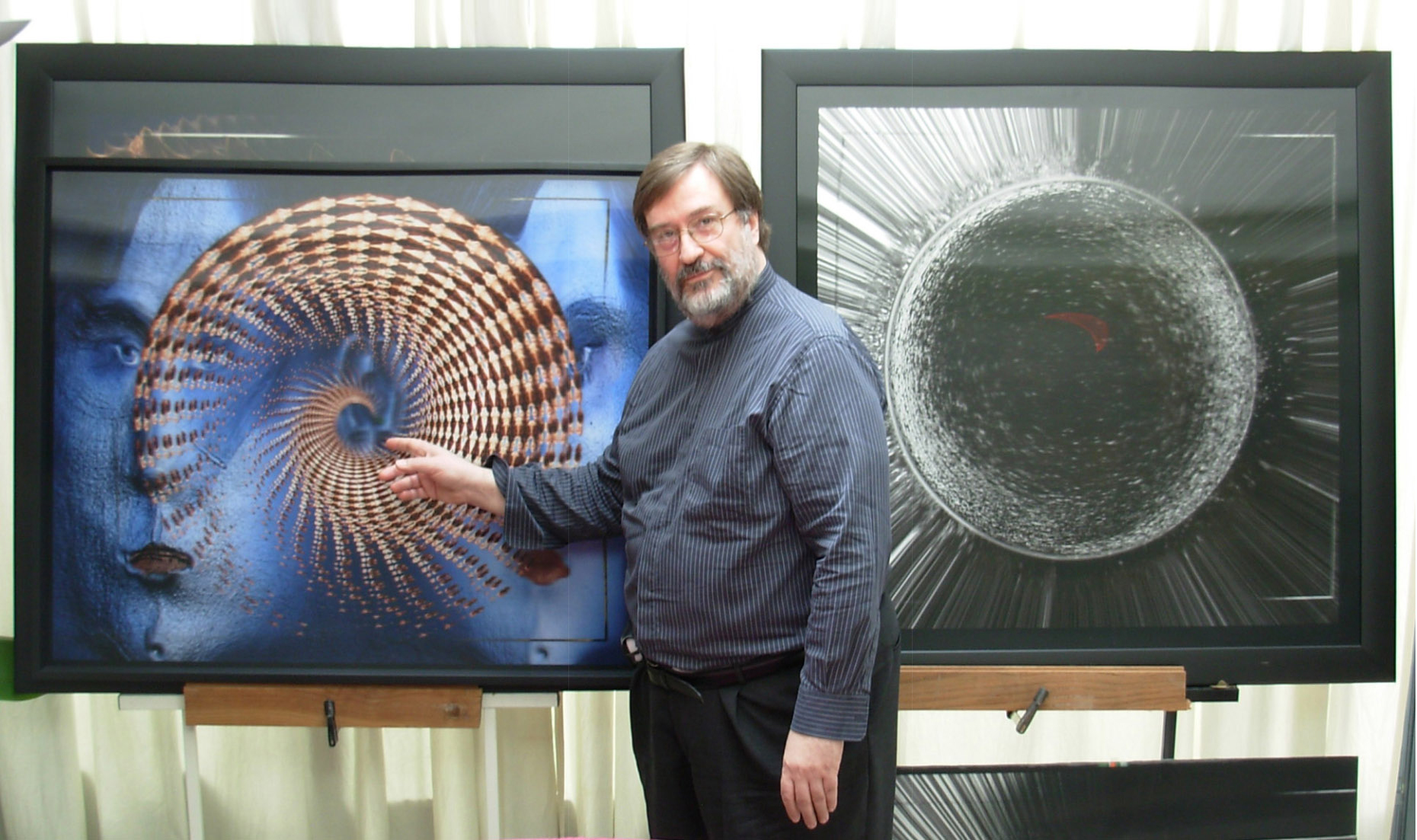
Frank Verpillat

Frank Verpillat (born in 1946 in Lyon, France, died 10 October 2010) was a French director, inventor and artist. In 1981 he conceived the prototype for the first operational virtual film editing machine and conducted extensive research leading and development in the fabrication and manipulation of 3D images.

== Training ==
He is an ex-student of ENSAM. In 1980, he was awarder the Prix de Rome of Cinema (Villa Médicis Hors les Murs).

== Filmography ==
Cinema

Beginning as a programmer and manager in Parisian cinema theatres (the Ranelagh in 1970, the Studio des Acacias), he then moved into distribution and production, working as assistant director and head of production. He directed 4 fiction shorts and one medium-length film (Ève avait l'éclat métallique de l'été in 1979), and the first full-length feature shot on video, with Michael Lonsdale and Daniel Mesguich, musical score by Michel Fano. He was then co-author, along with Alain Robbe-Grillet, of the adaptation of La Belle captive in 1983.

In France and in the USA he produced or co-produced seven full-length features (including La meilleure façon de marcher by Claude Miller, and Alain Robbe-Grillet's Le Jeu avec le feu) as well a dozen fiction shorts.

Verpillat was a co-founder of the Filmoblic corporation in 1974 (with Pierre-Henri Deleau, Jean-François Dion, Hubert Niogret and Hugo Santiago), as well as the founder of the corporation "French 75" in Hollywood, in 1975. In 1977 he was nominated for the César Award in the category "Best Fiction Short Film" for the film La Nuit du beau marin peut-être (1976).

TV

Since 1980 he has written or produced over fifteen hours of television programs and documentaries (including European Masterpieces in the USA), Wotan (preparation for the adaptation of the France 3 tetralogy) and, since 2001, for France 5.

TV programs

In the 1990s he directed HDTV programs for France Télécom in multiplex (for the Auditorium of the Louvre, and for medical congresses in Spain, Morocco and Switzerland), filming surgical procedures in 3D TV.

Following his first encounter with François Lanzenberg, he directed a number of programs for France 5 television.

- 1999: Un rêve de Racine (script with Daniel Mesguich),
- 2000: Histoire et techniques du cinéma en relief (co-written with Claude Haïm)
- 2001: Les grands stratèges et leurs chefs-d'oeuvre (with Laurent Henninger and Gabriel Peynichou)

And in the series "Portraits de la France":

- 2005: 14-18: le grand tournant
- 2006: La France dans le Monde
- 2006: La France et la construction européenne
- 2008: La Quatrième République, une république mal aimée
- 2008: La Cinquième République a 50 ans

Communication and in-house films

Since 1978 he has produced or directed about two hundred programs (mainly for Citroën): in-house shorts, billboards, multi-screens, 3D films, and internet communication sites. Towards the end of the 1980s, in association with avec Bernard Deyriès, he was script writer for the main attractions at Planète Magique.

== Inventions and technical achievements ==
In 1981, he conceived the prototype for the first operational virtual film editing machine and conducted extensive research, leading to the development, fabrication and manipulation of 3D images.

He collaborated in numerous 3D and multi-screen programs for theme parks (Parc de la Villette, in France) and in 1992 for the French pavillion's "Exposition Universelle" in 1992 in Seville. He is also the original creator of the "Diachronic Holoscopy" software.

Virtual editing and interactive narration

In 1980, thanks to financing by "Image du CNC" (Michel Fano), Verpillat was able to formulate the first prototype of a working non-linear editing system which he called "virtual editing". The apparatus uses an Apple II and two Philips videodisc players, both of which read rushes transferred to videodisc (software created by Gilles Bloch and Yves Languepin).

Because videodisc images were analogue and digital images were still in the experimental stage, this technique remained under-utilised until the explosion of digital imaging in the early 1990s (with the exception of the imposing "droid" in Lucasfilm which was developed soon after, using 81 Betamax).

Nevertheless, as so often happens, new technology leads to unexpected developments and the editing machine proved to be a useful tool for a different application: interactive narration, hitherto unknown. A positive public response led to a completely new region via different paths. Experiments were conducted in association with Philips, Thomson, and (more indirectly), with MIT. Verpillat's ideas played an important role in launching the Interactive Scripts competition organised by Ina in 1983.

"Pulling", 3D using a single camera

At the beginning of the 1990s, only Pierre Allio was conducting experimental research in the field of four-channelled polyscopy, using lenticular filter screens ("Aliospcopy", created in 1987). As far as the rest of the world was concerned, at that time (the early 1990s) stereoscopy meant the use of elaborate and complicated props: two synchronous cameras (silver-based or video), with paired and coordinated zooms.

By analysing the Pulfrich effect (the effect of certain one-dimensional images observed through a smoked lens placed over one eye, thus creating the impression of a 3D image), he understood that, under certain conditions, a time discrepancy could allow as many points of view as necessary. By means of this technique, which he called "Pulling" (from Pulfrich effect and tracking shot), most of the existing images taken from the side door of a helicopter become 3D.

Before the end of the 20th century, at a time when the calculation of synthesised images was still long and onerous, Pulling would be used to create synthesised 3D images (the same images were able to be used twice, three times, or even four or eight times, depending on the type of 3D utilised).

Diachronic holoscopy

At the end of the 1990s, Verpillat refined software designed to create images by mixing the pixels of a film taken from separate photograms, which creates a composite image that can bring together a number of diverse elements photographed at different times, which Verpillat called "an apparatus for photographing space-time." The potential to combine multiple images in this fashion can result in irrational juxtapositions, giving these composite images a surrealist effect. Cyril Cosenza and Colin Auger also contributed to this technology.

== Multimedia and internet ==
Verpillat has created a number of interactive programs for CD, DVD, and internet sites, as well as over thirty interactive programs forming part of DVD bonuses. He was also closely involved in the production of the AAsternance software created by Michel Fano. Since 2002, he and Dr Jacques Bady have been working together to perfect a Method of e-learning for medical training.

== Journalism and teaching ==
Verpillat has been a lecturer and journalist for a number of different publications: Le Monde Dimanche, Télérama, Encyclopædia Universalis, Video News. Between 1985 and 1995 he gave classes in two Parisian universities (Dauphine and Censier), while at the same time, conducting a number of audiovisual training courses.

== Visual arts ==
In 1980 he exhibited a number of his creations at the Salon d'Automne as well as in assorted exhibitions, either on his own, or alongside other artists. He manufactured screen prints in association with – amongst others – Deyriès, in l'ephémère Groupe Ptyx. He also produced numbered works from 1995, combining shapes created by means of diachronic software.

Since 2008, his work has been almost entirely dedicated to Lenticular High Relief using lenticular networks invented byGabriel Lippmann in 1908. The viewer, by moving laterally, observes, in 3D, a succession of elements which reveal themselves gradually in a sort of "layered" space.

This led to Verpillat's theory concerning the "peripatetic" consumption of his work ("peripatetic", since one is obliged to move in order to see the whole) which he calls "paranoiaque feuilletée" ("strata paranoia") in homage to Dalí.

Certain works in High Relief are abstract, some make use of diachronic forms, others are a "repetition" of old classics ("repetition" as used by Søren Kierkegaard, and Alain Robbe-Grillet).

In 2009 he was awarded the prize of the city of in Saint-Tropez at the 13th International Salon of Contemporary Art.

== Related fields and recreation ==
From 1997 to 1999 he was Vice President of the Commission Supérieure Technique de l'Image et du Son (CST). He was also one of the presidents of GREC (Groupe de Recherches et d'Essais Cinématographiques), President of the Centre Français des Opérations Territoriales, membre de la Société des Electriciens et Electroniciens Français, of the SMPTE (Society of Motion Picture and Television Engineers), the Société des Auteurs Multimedia, de la Société des Auteurs et Compositeurs Dramatiques, of the Francophone Alliance.

Over the past fifty years, Verpillat has exercised a number of martial arts. He met Jacques Normand in 1980, becoming one of his most faithful disciples. The martial arts he has studied include: Bo Jitsu, Iaï Jitsu, Kyūdō and Aikido.
