= Djinn (novel) =

1981 novel by Alain Robbe-Grillet

- First edition book cover for Djinn (1981)
- Author: Alain Robbe-Grillet
- Translator: Yvone Lenard and Walter Wells
- Language: French
- Genre: Nouveau Roman
- Publisher: Editions de Minuit
- Publication date: March 1981
- Publication place: France
- English publication date: May 1982
- Media type: Print
- ISBN: 978-2-7073-0328-8 (first edition, hardback)
- OCLC: 11519139
- Dewey Decimal: 843/.914 19
- LC Class: PQ2635.O117 D54 1981

Djinn is a novel by French writer Alain Robbe-Grillet. It was written as a French textbook with California State University, Dominguez Hills professor Yvone Lenard using a process of grammatical progression. Each chapter covers a specific element of French grammar which becomes increasingly difficult over the course of the novel. The first five chapters are written in the present tense from the first person point of view. The sixth chapter is written partially in the third person past and partially in the first person present. The eighth chapter is written in the first person point of view, but the narrator has changed from the masculine Simon Lecoeur to an unknown female narrator.

The work was first released in the United States with the title Le Rendez-vous (The Meeting) with Robbe-Grillet and Lenard as co-authors. As originally planned, Le Rendez-vous (The Meeting) contained questions at the end of each chapter. The same year, Robbe-Grillet re-released the text, removing the questions and adding a prologue and an epilogue to frame the story. A year later, the novel was translated into English by Lenard and Walter Wells, also of California State University, Dominguez Hills.

== Plot introduction ==
In many ways, Djinn resembles a detective fiction novel; yet at the same time, it is difficult to class as such. It tells the story of Simon Lecoeur, a thirty-year-old man, who allies himself with an American woman named Jean (Djinn) to act as a counteragent to technology. Djinn/Jean seems to lead Simon on a wild chase through Paris, but as with many of Robbe-Grillet's other works, all is not as it appears.

The plot of Djinn is surrounded by a frame story, a technique that Robbe-Grillet also employed in his novel Dans le Labyrinthe (1959). The police search the home of the narrator, supposed to be Simon Lecoeur, and find the manuscript lying on the desk. The manuscript is named Le Rendez-vous (The Appointment), which differs from the name of the novel.

=== Explanation of the novel's title ===
While the title Djinn seems to allude to a Genie or mystical spirit, it instead refers to the lead woman of the novel, Jean. In French, the name spelled Jean is pronounced [ʒɑ̃] and is the equivalent of the male name "John". The English pronunciation of Jean might be written more like djinn in French.

The name also takes on a certain ambiguity in the work. One of Simon Lecoeur's aliases is "Yann" or "Jan", which is another form of "John" (French: Jean). Simon Lecoeur remarks that Djinn/Jean physically reminds him of a fictional actress "Jane Frank" ("Jane" being a feminine form of "John" or "Jean"). The young boy that Simon meets in the Rue Vercingetorix III is named "Jean." Little Marie's mother is named "Jeanne."

== Plot summary ==
The Prologue opens with what we assume to be a police report. Simon Lecoeur has been reported missing for several days, so the authorities break into his apartment where they find a manuscript lying on the table. The contents of the manuscript are revealed in the following chapters.

The narrator, responding to a newspaper ad, goes to a deserted industrial park to meet his potential boss, Jean. The narrator assumes that Jean is a man and sees him at the end of a building dressed in a coat, hat, and dark glasses. "Monsieur Jean" turns out to be an American woman. Djinn/Jean asks the narrator to join her social cause, and as proof of his fidelity, she asks him to meet someone at the Parisian train station, the Gare du Nord. The narrator stops at a café on his way to the train station. There, a young student tells him that he is going to be late and suggests a short-cut. The narrator assumes that this woman is one of Djinn/Jean's agents, as she seems to know who he is and where he is going.

He leaves and takes the short cut, which leads him through the Rue Vercingetorix III, a street name that cannot possibly exist. There, he sees a boy run into the street and fall down as if dead. The narrator decides to help, and he carries the boy into the nearest building. The narrator meets the boy's sister, Marie, who tells him that her brother Jean "dies" frequently. The narrator takes this to mean that the boy is subject to some kind of seizure. The narrator asks about the boy and the girl's parents, and the girl shows the narrator a photograph of a Russian sailor who died at sea and whom she claims is their father. Marie gives the narrator a letter written by Djinn/Jean. In it, he reads that the train station destination was in reality meant to be nothing more than a wild goose chase.

The boy wakes up, and the two children lead the narrator to a café. At the café, Marie asks the narrator to tell a story. When the narrator is unable to come up with a story that meets her specifications, she proceeds to tell her own tale. The time comes for the narrator to leave with Jean. He is made to wear dark glasses and carry a cane as if he were blind. Jean is his guide, and they get into a taxi. In the taxi, Jean gives the narrator a drug that makes him sleep. When he awakes, he is led into a large room with other people. He hears Djinn/Jean's voice explain their mission, which is to fight against machinery of all kinds. She warns that robots and computers will control the earth.

The narrator manages to move the glasses while scratching his nose, and he sees that there are many other young men just like him, with dark glasses, canes, and little boys as guides. He also realizes that Djinn/Jean is not present. They are listening to a tape recording of her voice. The man next to him attempts to communicate something, but the narrator is knocked unconscious. The narrator (who is finally revealed as Simon Lecoeur) wakes up and has no memory of what has happened, other than he knows he met with Djinn/Jean and needs to go to the Gare du Nord.

Again, he stops at the same café, which sparks some memory of which he is unsure. The server has changed to a lady named Marie. He notices a picture of a Russian sailor, and Marie remarks that this is her father, who died at sea. Simon notices a cane at the table next to him and decides to pretend like he is blind. He walks out of the café, where a young boy offers to help him on his way to the Gare du Nord. Realizing that they will miss the train from Amsterdam, the two start running, and Simon trips and falls on the boy, who looks as though he were dead.

Simon decides to take the boy into the nearest house. Inside the home, he places the boy on the bed and sees a young woman who looks like Djinn/Jean. She explains that the boy can see visions of the future, and that she and the narrator are not real. They exist only in the boy's dream. She is long-dead, having died in an accident involving machinery and computers. The narrator is alive, but his true self is currently in a meeting across town involving an anti-machinery terrorist organization. She reveals that the narrator will become the boy's father and that he will die at sea.

The narrator is now a woman. She answers a newspaper ad looking for a babysitter. Another applicant comes, and each mistakes the other for the potential employer. She and the other man Simon begin a friendly game where she pretends that she is the employer; and she makes up a story about an anti-industrial terrorist organization as a joke. They go to a café, where they tell stories. She takes a cab to the train station to meet her friend Caroline who is arriving from Amsterdam. Caroline comes with her niece Marie, whose father is a Russian sailor. In the background, the narrator notices the sinister cab driver as well as a blind man being led by a young boy. She feels that the cab driver is surveying her too closely, and she faints. When she awakes, she cannot remember anything other than the fact that she has a meeting with a potential employer in a deserted industrial park. She goes there and sees a man standing at the end of the corridor wearing a coat, a hat, and dark glasses...

In the epilogue, the police have discovered a body matching the description of Djinn/Jean. However, the agent that we assume to be the police in the prologue is revealed to belong to some other counter-organization working against the police investigation. Of all the characters in the manuscript, the only one whose existence can be verified is that of young Marie.

== Characters in "Djinn" ==
- 'Simon Lecoeur' - the primary narrator of chapters 1-7. He is a thirty-something man, revealed in the prologue to be an English teacher at a school in the Rue du Passy in Paris. He is blond with pale colored eyes. He goes by "Yann," "Jan," "Robin Körsimos," and "Boris Koershimen"
- 'Djinn'/'Jean' - a young American woman from Boston who engages the narrator in her fight against machines. She may also be the narrator of chapter 8. She is tall, blond, and attractive. She may also be androgynous-looking, as the frame story mentions a physical similarity between Djinn/Jean and Simon Lecoeur.
- 'Jean' - a boy of about ten. He is first seen in the vacant house with his sister, Marie. He appears again later in the book to guide the narrator to the clandestine meeting with Djinn/Jean's organisation.
- 'Marie' - a seven-year-old girl. She is first seen in the vacant house with her brother Jean. She appears later in the book at the Gare du Nord with her aunt, Caroline.
- 'Marie' - an older woman who serves at the cafe.
- 'Caroline' - a friend of the narrator of chapter 8, possibly Djinn/Jean
- 'Doctor Morgan' - a made-up person in a story that Simon Lecoeur tells the female narrator in chapter 8. In the epilogue, Doctor Morgan is revealed to be the doctor at the school where Simon Lecoeur works.
- 'Jeanne' - the young Marie's mother. She is only referred to in the text.
- 'Joseph' - the young Marie's father. He is only referred to in the text.
- 'Laura' - a woman (possibly a mannequin) who appears with Djinn/Jean in the opening chapter of the book.

== Literary significance and reception ==
Perhaps because of its initial role as a textbook, Djinn has been largely disregarded by critics. In particular, critics complain about its artificial means of generating grammatical points and cultural contexts. For example, young Marie specifically asks Simon Lecoeur to tell her a story using the historical past tense. The fact that Djinn/Jean is American also creates opportunities to point out cultural differences that exist between the English and French languages. One example is the difference between the American English first floor (rez-de-chaussée in French) and a French premier étage (second floor in American English). The usage of formal and informal voice is also explored at length in the narrative.

The Australian composer Lindsay Vickery has written an opera based on the novel.

== Publication history ==
- 1981, France, Editions de Minuit ISBN 2-7073-0328-3, 1 May 1981, hardcover
- 1982, USA, Grove/Atlantic, Inc., ISBN 0-394-52569-8, 1 May 1982, hardcover
- 1985, France, Editions de Minuit ISBN 2-7073-1038-7, 1 October 1985, paperback
