= Alice Crimmins =

American woman convicted of manslaughter

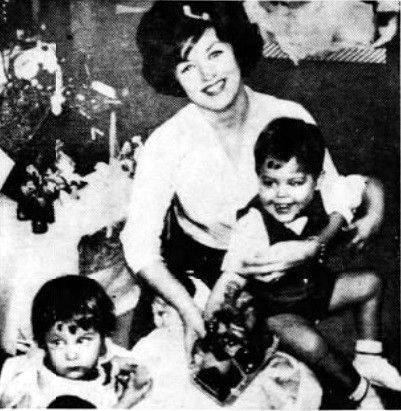
- Crimmins, pictured with her children, c. 1963
- Born: March 9, 1939 (age 87); The Bronx, New York City, New York, U.S.
- Spouses: Edmund Crimmins; Tony Grace (m. 1977; died 1998)
- Children: Alice Marie Crimmins; Eddie Crimmins Jr.

Alice Crimmins (born March 9, 1939, in the Bronx, New York City) is an American woman who was charged with killing her two children, 5-year-old Eddie Jr. and 4-year-old Alice Marie (known as Missy), both of whom went missing on July 14, 1965. Alice Marie's body was found that day, and Eddie Jr.'s was found five days later. After numerous criminal trials and appeals, Crimmins was convicted of manslaughter for Missy's death.

== Killing of her children ==
Crimmins's children, Eddie Jr., age 5, and Missy, age 4, disappeared from their garden apartment in Kew Gardens Hills in the Queens borough of New York City on July 14, 1965. She reported the missing children to the police. Later that day, Missy's strangled body was found. Five days later, Eddie's body was discovered, but authorities were unable to identify the cause of his death.

No evidence could be found tying anyone to the deaths. Crimmins was followed and covertly recorded by the New York Police Department for three years, before finally being charged and going to trial in 1968. She was found guilty of the manslaughter of Missy and sentenced to five to twenty years' imprisonment. This conviction was overturned on appeal, and in 1971 a second trial resulted in Crimmins being convicted of the first-degree murder of Eddie Jr. and the manslaughter of Missy. In 1973 both convictions were overturned, before Crimmins was re-convicted of the manslaughter of Missy in 1973. She was paroled in 1977.

The Casey Anthony trial has been compared by some in the media to the Crimmins trial. Under her married name of Alice Grace she lives in Northwest Florida.

== In popular culture ==
- The Alice Crimmins Case by Kenneth Gross (1975) (non-fiction account)
- Ordeal By Trial by George Carpozi Jr. (1972) (non-fiction account)
- The Investigation by Dorothy Uhnak (fiction based on the case)
- The Price of Justice (TV-movie version of Dorothy Uhnak's The Investigation)
- Where Are The Children? (book and subsequent 1986 movie) by Mary Higgins Clark
- A Question of Guilt, with Tuesday Weld as Alice Crimmins, aired on CBS Feb. 21, 1978
- Landscape of the Body play by John Guare, opened in 1977
- Two Small Bodies play by Neal Bell, opened in 1977
- Two Small Bodies film by Beth B, from 1993
- Investigation Discovery series A Crime to Remember episode, "Go Ask Alice", aired in 2013
- Little Deaths by Emma Flint, 2017 novel, Picador
- The Crime Junkie podcast covered Alice Crimmins on 7/9/2019
- The Let's Go To Court podcast covered Alice Crimmins on 9/5/2018
- Murder Mystery and Makeup series by Bailey Sarian episode, "Cold-blooded Killer or FRAMED? Was Alice Crimmins Really Guilty?" on 3/18/2024
