= La Jalousie =

1957 novel by Alain Robbe-Grillet

La Jalousie (transl. Jealousy) is a 1957 novel by Alain Robbe-Grillet. The French title, "la jalousie", is a play on words that can be translated as "jealousy", but also as "the jalousie window".

La Jalousie is an example of the nouveau roman genre, for which Robbe-Grillet later explicitly advocated in his 1963 Pour un nouveau roman (For a New Novel).

Robbe-Grillet argued that the novel was constructed along the lines of an "absent" third-person narrator. In that account of the novel, the narrator, a jealous husband, silently observes the interactions of his wife (referred to only as "A...") and a neighbour, Franck. The silent narrator, who never names himself (and whose presence is merely inferred, e.g. by the number of place settings at the dinner table or deck chairs on the verandah) is extremely suspicious that A... is having an affair with Franck. Throughout the novel, he continually replays his observations and suspicions (that is, created scenarios about A... and Franck), so much so that it becomes impossible to distinguish moments that are observed from those that are merely suspected.

Robbe-Grillet has noted that the setting is deliberately ambiguous and self-contradictory, with elements from a number of world regions.

La Jalousie was a critical success but commercially disappointing. The novel was considered for television adaptations by the BBC but ultimately discounted.
