= French 75 =

French 75 or variations thereof may refer to:

- Canon de 75 modèle 1897 (also French 75), a quick-firing field artillery piece adopted in March 1898
- French 75 (cocktail), made from gin, champagne, lemon juice, and sugar
- French 75, a company founded by French director, inventor and artist Frank Verpillat
- "French 75", the B-side of 1965's "Bright Lights, Big City" by American rock band The Champs
- "French 75", the sixth song by American heavy metal band Cane Hill on their 2015 EP Cane Hill
- "The French 75", a song by American singer Janelle Monáe on her 2023 album The Age of Pleasure
- The French 75, a fictional far-left revolutionary group from Paul Thomas Anderson's 2025 film One Battle After Another
- French 75 Bar, a Arnaud's#French 75 Bar bar in the New Orleans restaurant Arnaud's

== See also ==
- French (disambiguation)
- 75 (disambiguation)
