= Catherine Arley =

French novelist (1922–2016)

- Born: Pierrette Henriette Denise Marthe Pernot; 20 December 1922; Paris, France
- Died: 25 July 2016 (aged 93); Paris, France
- Occupations: Novelist, actress
- Known for: Detective novels

Pierrette Henriette Denise Marthe Pernot (20 December 1922 – 25 July 2016), better known professionally as Catherine Arley, was a French novelist and actress.

== Biography ==
After high school, Catherine Arley joined the National Conservatory of Dramatic Arts of Paris. She played in street theatre and in some films, taking part in the French production of Fleuve étincelant (The Flashing Stream) by Charles Langbridge Morgan. She gave up her acting career after her marriage and at the same time as her first novel, Tu vas mourir, appeared in the 1953 Éditions Denoël collection "Oscar" edited by Marcel Duhamel. Despite this encouraging welcome, her second novel, La Femme de paille, a story of fraudulent adoption, was rejected by every French publisher to whom she offered it. She then looked abroad for a publisher and her novel was eventually published in Switzerland in 1954, then translated into twenty-four languages, and filmed by Basil Dearden starring Gina Lollobrigida and Sean Connery. This international fame still did not help her to find a French publisher. From 1962 to 1972, she only published three novels: Le Talion (1962), Les Beaux Messieurs font comme ça (1968), which won an international prize for suspense, and Les Valets d'épée (1968).

It was not until 1972 that she managed to be published in France: Pierre Geneva (pseudonym of Marc Schweizer) launched the "Suspense" series published by Eurédif and she became their star author. This period was Arley's heyday as she published, among others, Duel au premier sang (1973, brought to the screen by Sergio Gobbi under the title Blondy), Les Armures de sable (1976), and À tête reposée (1976), the narrative of a tragedy lived by a father whose child is condemned to death, written with great simplicity and winner of the 1979 prize for French Suspense.

In 1980, Eurédif stopped their police series. Arley moved to Le Masque series which published her new stories and her reissues for two years. Her novel À cloche-cœur received the 1981 prize for adventure novels. In 1990 the Fleuve noir publishing house published Arley's En 5 sets, but her later novels appeared directly in translation to Japanese where they were immediately adapted for television. Arley also created a theatrical adaptation of La Femme de paille, which was televised in 1976.

Georges Rieben noted "her taste for romantic drama, her grasp of the human condition, imprisoned by tiny miseries, subjugated to its destiny". In her novels, Arley displays a great sense of suspense, not hesitating to add moments of cruelty and touches of humour.

With her international career, Arley has sold more than two million books between Collins, her English publisher, and Random House, her American publisher. She remains one of the leading authors of the decade 1970 to 1980, having forged a place in French literature for non-conformist and amoral detective fiction. Arley's reputation in France suffered from a lack of adventurous French publishers who favoured the roman noir and neo-polar style at that time.

Arley died in Paris on 25 July 2016, at the age of 93.

== Bibliography ==
=== Novels ===
Tu vas mourir

- Paris : Denoël, 1953, 255 pages (Oscar; 15)
- Paris : Publications Zed, 1963, 188 pages (Haute tension; 6)

Reissued as: Mourir sans toi

- Paris : Eurédif, 1973, 216 pages (Suspense; 6)
- Paris : Eurédif, 1976, 187 pages (Suspense poche; 16)

La Femme de paille

- Genève; Paris : Jeheber, 1954
- Paris : Eurédif, 1972, 249 pages (Suspense; 4)
- Paris : Eurédif, 1975, 249 pages (Suspense poche; 10)
- Paris : Librairie des Champs-Élysées, 1982, 251 pages (Club des Masques; 479)

Le Talion

- Paris : Presses internationales, 1962, 192 pages (Inter-Police choc; 20)
- Paris : Inter-Presse, 1967, 231 pages
- Paris : Eurédif, 1972, 205 pages (Suspense; 2)
- Paris : Eurédif, 1975, 251 pages (Suspense poche; 7)
- Paris : Librairie des Champs-Élysées, 1981, 222 pages (Club des Masques; 434)

Les Beaux messieurs font comme ça – Prix International du Suspense 1968

- Paris : Nalis, 1968, 240 pages (novel of the month)
- Paris : Cercle Européen du Livre, 1969, 253 pages – Foreword by Françoise Janin.

Reissued as: La Baie des Trépassés

- Paris : Eurédif, 1977, 201 pages (from the GF series)
- Montréal : Presses Sélect, 1980, 201 pages (Poche Sélect; 263. Série Mystère 3)
- Paris : Librairie des Champs-Élysées, 1982, 221 pages (Club des Masques; 468)

Les Valets d’épée

- Paris : Edmond Nalis, 1968, 253 pages (Le Poche du mois; 10)
- Paris : Eurédif, 1974, 222 pages (Suspense; 14). ISBN 2-7167-0260-8
- Paris : EURÉDIF, 1977, 186 pages (Suspense poche. 2nd series; 28). ISBN 2-7167-0506-2
- Paris : Librairie des Champs-Élysées, 1982, 156 pages (Club des masques; 492). ISBN 2-7024-1297-1

Vingt millions et une sardine

- Paris : Eurédif, 1972 ("Suspense" 1)

Le Pique-feu

- Paris : Eurédif, 1972 (Suspense; 3)

Le Fait du prince

- Paris : EURÉDIF, 1973, 212 pages (Collection Suspense; 5)
- Paris : EURÉDIF, 1976, 186 pages (Collection Suspense poche. first series; 13). ISBN 2-7167-0370-1
- Cessez de pleurer, Melfy ! (Eurédif "Suspense" 9, 1973)
- Duel au premier sang / Blondy (Eurédif "Suspense" 10, 1973)
- Oublie-moi, Charlotte ! (Eurédif "Suspense" 11, 1974)
- Robinson-Cruauté (Eurédif "Suspense" 12, 1974)
- La Galette des rois (Eurédif "Suspense" 16, 1975)
- La Garde meurt… (Eurédif "Suspense Poche" 1, 1975)
- Bête à en mourir (Eurédif "Suspense Poche" 8, 1975)
- Les Armures de sable (Eurédif "Suspense Poche" 14, 1976)
- À tête reposée (Eurédif, "Suspense Poche" 107, 1976, Prix du Suspense français 1979)
- La Banque des morts (Eurédif hors coll., 1977)
- L’Enfer, pourquoi pas ! (Eurédif hors coll., 1978)
- L’Amour à la carte / À cloche-cœur (Eurédif hors coll., 1979 / Masque 1647, 1981, Prix du Roman d’Aventures 1981)
- L’Homme de craie (Masque 1619, 1980)
- L’Ogresse (Masque 1653, 1981)
- Une femme piégée (Masque 1673, 1982)
- Le Battant et la cloche (Masque 1694, 1982)
- En 5 sets (Fleuve noir large format, 1990)

=== Theatre ===
- La Femme de paille (L’Avant-scène théâtre 591, 1976)

=== Short stories ===
- Le Sens du devoir (in Noir Magazine 1, 1954)
- En un vieux coup de miséricorde (Mystère magazine 300, 1973)
- À naître de père inconnu (Mystère magazine 307, 1973)
- Murder-lady (Mystère magazine 309, 1973)
- L’Amour monstrueux de Traudi (Mystère magazine 313, 1974)
- Calvaire à forfait (Mystère Magazine 318, 1974)
- Simple question d’humanité (Mystère magazine 322, 1974)
- Leur Maison sur le wash… (Mystère magazine 324, 1975)
- La Maison (Mystère magazine 342, 1976)
- Les Abeilles du grand rituel (Magazine du Mystère 1, 1976)
- Une incroyable histoire (Magazine du Mystère 9, 1977)

== Stage productions ==
- 1950 : L'Échange de Paul Claudel, directed by Hubert Gignoux, Centre dramatique de l'Ouest
- La Femme de paille (police comedy in two acts, 1976), directed by Raymond Gérôme. Text: Catherine Arley, from her novel La Femme de paille. Production: théâtre Edouard VII, 1976. Scenery: Roger Harth. Costumes: Donald Caldwel. Cast: André Dumas (Édouard the butler), Nicole Calfan (Hildegarde Maener), Raymond Gérôme (Anton Korff), Louis Seigner (Karl Richmond).

== Filmography ==
=== As an actor ===
- The Seventh Door (France, 1947). Director: André Zwobada. Duration: 88 minutes. Cast: María Casares, Catherine Arley, Liane Dayde, Georges Marchal.
- Un certain monsieur (France, 1949). Director: Yves Ciampi
- Une histoire d'amour (France, 1951). Director: Guy Lefranc
- The Agony of the Eagles (France, 1952). Director: Jean Alden-Delos

=== As author ===
- Blondy (France–West Germany, 1975) - Film. Foreign titles: Germicide – Vortex (US, 1979). Director: Sergio Gobbi. Screenplay based on the Catherine Arley novel Duel au premier sang. Photography: Jean Bordal. Editing: Gabriel Rongier. Duration: 105 minutes. Cast: Catherine Jourdan (Blondie), Rod Taylor (Christopher Tauling), Mathieu Carrière (Tauling), Bibi Andersson (Patricia Tauling), Paul Guers, Christian Barbier (Rex), Yves Brainville (diplomat), Walter Buschhoff (Dr. Ruth), Robert Le Béal (diplomat), Hans Meyer (Inspector), François Patrice (Inspector), Elisabeth Strauss (director), Maurice Travail (presenter), Monique Vita (Maria).
- Woman of Straw (Great Britain, 1964) - Film. French title: La Femme de paille. Director: Basil Dearden. Screenplay: Stanley Mann, Robert Muller and Michael Relph based on the Catherine Arley novel La Femme de paille. Production: Michael Relph. Music: Norman Percival. Photography: Otto Heller (Eastmancolor). Editing: John D. Guthridge. Sets: Ken Adam. Art director: Peter Murton. Scene decorator: Freda Pearson. Costumes: Beatrice Dawson et Christian Dior. Production designer: Charles Orme. Assistant director: Clive Reed. Sound: Ray Baker. Duration: 117 minutes. Cast: Gina Lollobrigida (Maria Marcello), Sean Connery (Anthony Richmond), Ralph Richardson (Charles Richmond), Alexander Knox (Lomer), Johnny Sekka (Thomas), Laurence Hardy (Baynes), Peter Madden (yacht captain), Danny Daniels, Noel Howlett, A.J. Brown, Robert Bruce, Georgina Cookson, Michael Corcoran, George Curzon, Gilada Dahlberg, Michael Goodlife, Ronald Hatton (Dr Murray), Joseph Wise (Peters), George Zenios (waiter at l’Island Hôtel).
- Un beau petit milliard (France, 1991) - Téléfilm. Director: Pierre Tchernia. Screenplay: Philippe David, Éric Reynaud-Fourton and Pierre Tchernia. Duration: 98 minutes. Cast: Michel Galabru (Gilbert), Odette Laure (Mathilde / Mélanie), Pascale Roberts (Yvonne), Jean-Claude Bouillon (André), Jacques Dacqmine (M. de Mouriez), Henri Guybert (Felix), Jean-Claude Leguay (Dunoyer), Joel Lefrançois (René), Christiane Muller (Adrienne), Raymond Aquilon (postman), Bruno Balph (colleague), Jacqueline Valois (Gaby), Lily Fayol (Mado), Danielle Rocca (the housekeeper).
- Le Secret du petit milliard (France, 1992) - Téléfilm. Director: Pierre Tchernia. Screenplay: Philippe David, Éric Reynaud-Fourton and Pierre Tchernia. Duration: 87 minutes. Cast: Michel Galabru (Gilbert), Odette Laure (Mathilde / Mélanie), Pascale Roberts (Yvonne), Georges Corraface (John), Michel Serrault (Armand), Henri Guybert (Félix), Jacques Dacqumine (the notary), Joël Lefrançois (René), Alan Boone (Elliott), Éric Averlant (Franck).

=== Television theatre ===
- La Femme de paille (police comedy in two acts, 1976). Programme: Au théâtre ce soir 248. Director: Pierre Sabbagh. Recording: Saturday, 15 May 1976 at the théâtre Edouard-VII. Broadcast: Friday 3 December 1976 on the first channel. Staging: Raymond Gérôme. Sets: Roger Harth. Costumes: Donald Cardwell. Soundtrack: Fred Kiriloff. Cast: André Dumas (Edouard the butler), Nicole Calfan (Hildegarde Maener), Raymond Gérôme (Anton Korff), Louis Seigner (Karl Richmond).
