= La Reprise (novel) =

2001 novel by Alain Robbe-Grillet

- Author: Alain Robbe-Grillet
- Original title: La Reprise
- Language: French
- Publication date: 2001
- Publication place: France

La Reprise is a French novel in the Nouveau roman style by French writer Alain Robbe-Grillet published in France in October 2001 by Les Éditions de Minuit. It was the first novel published by Robbe-Grillet in 20 years. An English version, translated by American poet and translator Richard Howard, was published as Repetition (sometimes subtitled A Novel) in 2003. It was also published as an audiobook.

The plot follows a French secret service agent, Henri Robin, sent on a special mission to Berlin in 1949. He sees his own Doppelgänger, and the novel becomes more and more mysterious and dreamlike. The story is commented on by an unknown narrator, who points out inconsistencies in Robin's own story, and the novel eventually (according to reviewer Heller McAlpin) emerges as "a Sophoclean oedipal revenge drama, complete with incest, blindness..., parricide and fratricide.

It is a comic spy thriller. Robbe-Grillet once wrote: "All my novels are comic. Perhaps La Reprise more so". It has been compared to Graham Greene's novel The Third Man, or an Alfred Hitchcock film.
