= La Belle captive =

1983 film

- Film poster
- Directed by: Alain Robbe-Grillet
- Screenplay by: Alain Robbe-Grillet
- Produced by: Anatole Dauman
- Starring: Daniel Mesguich; Gabrielle Lazure; Cyrielle Clair
- Cinematography: Henri Alekan
- Edited by: Bob Wade
- Production companies: Argos films; FR3 Cinema
- Distributed by: Argos films
- Release date: 1983 (France)
- Running time: 89 minutes
- Country: France

La Belle captive is a 1983 French avant-garde film directed by Alain Robbe-Grillet. A playful mystery, the film combines elements of erotic allure and supernatural horror with a pulp fiction plot. Suffused with visual surrealism, it often explicitly evokes the works of René Magritte.

== Plot ==
Walter Raim, a junior operative in an intelligence agency, is attracted by a provocative blonde in a night club, but she will not give him her name or telephone number. He is summoned by his boss, Sara Zeitgeist, to deliver an urgent letter to a senior politician, Henry de Corynthe.

In open country, he sees a woman lying in the road. When he stops to help her, it is the mystery blonde with her clothes awry and her thigh bloody. Loading her into his car, he stops at the first house to ask for help. An all-male party is going on and they think he has brought them some entertainment. They show him and her to a bedroom, where she revives sufficiently to make love, inflicting deep bites to his neck.

In the morning, she and all the guests have gone. Walter finds a chain she was wearing that has her name engraved on a plaque - Marie-Ange van de Reeves. Stopping for a coffee, he sees in the morning paper that Marie-Ange is due to marry Henry de Corynthe but has been abducted. He rushes back to the empty house and asks next door, but gets no help. At last going to de Corynthe's house, he finds him dying from a heart attack and the police searching for clues over Marie-Ange's whereabouts.

Walter blunders on trying to find the truth about Marie-Ange, while the police suspect him of murder. It is possible that the real Marie-Ange died years ago and that what de Corynthe and Walter have fallen in love with is a vampire. It is also possible that Walter is dreaming the whole mystery. As he drives off to work one morning, he again sees the body of Marie-Ange in the road. A van full of police in combat gear arrives, and Sara Zeitgeist orders them to shoot him.

== Cast ==
- Daniel Mesguich as Walter Raim
- Cyrielle Clair as Sara Zeitgeist
- Daniel Emilfork as Inspector Francis
- François Chaumette as Dr. Morgentodt
- Gabrielle Lazure as Marie-Ange van de Reeves
- Arielle Dombasle as The hysterical woman
- Gilles Arbona as The barman
- Jean-Claude Leguay as The cyclist
- Nancy Van Slyke as The waitress
- Denis Fouqueray as The valet
- Michel Auclair as Walter's voice
- Roland Dubillard as Prof van de Reeves

== Release ==
La Belle captive was released in France in 1983; it was distributed by Argos Films. The film was entered into the 33rd Berlin International Film Festival. In a review, Tim Lucas noted that it was "not especially successful in France, but it was one of (Robbe-Grillet's) most popular films abroad."

Lucas also noted that Sight & Sound Alain Robbe-Grillet is "said to be rigorously protective of his films -- despite their exploitable elements of sex, mystery, fetishism and even supernatural horror -- not wishing them to become associated with the similar though less cerebral works of fellow oneirics and eroticists like Jean Rollin and Jess Franco; consequently, they have had virtually no authorised presence on home video apart from an academically issued limited edition of SECAM tapes in the 1980s." A DVD of the La Belle captive was released by Koch Lorber in 2007.

== Reception ==
Critic Tim Lucas (Sight & Sound) described the film as "Robbe-Grillet lite. Its lead actors fail to fascinate and it lacks the hypnotic allure that distinguished Marienbad and L'Immortelle." Lucas opined that the film may "have been more involving, one imagines, had its allusions been subtitled, rather than its narcissistic dialogue and narration." but that the film still "shares the self-reflexive sense of humour of Robbe-Grillet's Trans-Europ Express and that "several of (cinematographer) Alekan's images are appropriately captivating."

Michael Brooke (Sight & Sound) noted that despite the DVD cover's comparison to David Lynch's Eraserhead, La Belle captive was "Alain Robbe-Grillet's most explicit tribute to the original French Surrealist movement.", noting that "Robbe-Grillet constantly undermines narrative, temporal and spatial expectations at every turn while teasing the viewer with iconography drawn from Magritte, American thrillers, Murnau's Nosferatu and much else. It's tempting to assume that the somewhat vacant lead performances are absolutely as intended, the better to offset Daniel Emilfork's grotesque police investigator, smirking at knowledge that he's withholding from everyone else."
