= Two Small Bodies =

- Directed by: Beth B
- Written by: Beth B (screenplay); Neal Bell (screenplay)
- Based on: Two Small Bodies by Neal Bell
- Produced by: Daniel Zuta
- Starring: Suzy Amis; Fred Ward
- Cinematography: Phil Parmet
- Edited by: Andrea Feige; Melody London; Minka Maslowski
- Music by: Swans
- Distributed by: Goethe-Institut; Castle Hill Productions (United States)
- Release date: 1993
- Running time: 88 minutes
- Countries: Germany; United States
- Language: English

Two Small Bodies is a 1993 American thriller film directed by Beth B and starring Fred Ward and Suzy Amis.

The film is based on the 1977 American stage play Two Small Bodies by Neal Bell.

The film was screened at the 1994 Sundance Film Festival.

== Premise ==
A hostess at a strip joint awakens to find her two children are missing. A police lieutenant suspects that she killed them and questions her for days.

== Background ==
The story is loosely connected to the true story of the death of the two children of Alice Crimmins who were discovered missing on July 14, 1965.
