= Zoo zéro =

1979 film

- Directed by: Alain Fleischer
- Written by: Alain Fleischer
- Produced by: François Barat; Pierre Barat
- Starring: Catherine Jourdan; Klaus Kinski
- Cinematography: Bruno Nuytten
- Edited by: Eric Pluet
- Release date: 9 May 1979
- Running time: 101 minutes
- Country: France
- Language: French

Zoo zéro is a 1979 French film directed by Alain Fleischer and starring Klaus Kinski.

== Plot ==
A singer at a nightclub seeks to evade the control of her agent by wandering the city at night.

== Cast ==
- Catherine Jourdan - Eva
- Klaus Kinski - Yavé
- Pierre Clémenti - Ivo
- Lisette Malidor - Ivy
- Rufus - Yves
- Piéral - Uwe
- Alida Valli - Yvonne
- Christine Chappey - Yvette
- Anthony Steffen - Evariste
- Jacky Belhassen - Yvon
- Fabien Belhassen - Yvan
