= Trans-Europ-Express (film) =

1966 film by Alain Robbe-Grillet

- French theatrical release poster
- Directed by: Alain Robbe-Grillet
- Written by: Alain Robbe-Grillet
- Produced by: Samy Halfon
- Starring: Jean-Louis Trintignant; Marie-France Pisier
- Cinematography: Willy Kurant
- Edited by: Bob Wade
- Music by: Michel Fano
- Production company: Como Films
- Distributed by: Lux CCF
- Release date: 1966
- Running time: 105 minutes
- Countries: France; Belgium
- Language: French

Trans-Europ-Express is a 1966 experimental film written and directed by Alain Robbe-Grillet and starring Jean-Louis Trintignant and Marie-France Pisier. The title refers to the Trans Europ Express, at the time an international rail network in Europe. A frame story shows a creative team devising a film plot during a train journey to Antwerp, intercut with a film-within-a-film about a novice cocaine smuggler and a prostitute that enacts their outline imperfectly.

== Plot ==
The film-within-the-film features a Frenchman named Elias who takes his first consignment of cocaine from Paris to Antwerp on the Trans Europ Express. There, he is passed from one mysterious intermediary to another and, with some time to spare, enacts a rape fantasy with a prostitute called Eva. Eventually, he reaches his top contact, who reveals that his cargo was powdered sugar and the whole exercise was a test of his loyalty.

Told that his next assignment will be to take a shipment back to Paris, he looks up Eva for another session and discovers there that she has betrayed him to the police. Initiating a bondage fantasy, he strangles her and immediately goes into hiding. Slipping out to buy a newspaper, he sees a report of the murder above an advertisement for a strip club where the star performer in a bondage fantasy resembles Eva. On arriving there, he is surrounded by police, but before they can arrest him, he is shot dead by his contact.

When the characters in the frame story return to Paris and buy a newspaper, behind them in the crowd, Elias and Eva are seen embracing.

== Cast ==
- Jean-Louis Trintignant as Elias
- Marie-France Pisier as Eva
- Christian Barbier as Lorentz
- Henri Lambert as Lorentz, the police inspector
- Charles Millot as Franck
- Gérard Palaprat as the young host
- Catherine Robbe-Grillet as Lucette, the script supervisor
- Prima Symphony as the stripper
- Nadine Verdier as the hotel maid
- Virginie Vignon as the saleswoman
- Daniel Emilfork as the policeman
- Alain Robbe-Grillet as Jean, the film director (uncredited)
- Jess Hahn as one of the inspectors at the locker (uncredited)

== Reception ==
Screenwriter Robert McKee characterises Trans-Europ-Express as a "nonplot" film—that is, a film that does not tell a story.

The film was released on DVD in 2008 in Italy by Ripley's Home Video and on Blu-ray in 2014 in the US by Redemption Films.
