= Vortex (1976 film) =

1976 film by Sergio Gobbi

- French theatrical release poster
- French: Blondy
- Directed by: Sergio Gobbi
- Screenplay by: Catherine Arley; Sergio Gobbi; Lucio Attinelli
- Dialogue by: Lucio Attinelli
- Based on: Duel au premier sang by Catherine Arley
- Starring: Bibi Andersson; Catherine Jourdan; Mathieu Carrière; Rod Taylor
- Cinematography: Jean Badal
- Edited by: Gabriel Rongier
- Music by: Stelvio Cipriani
- Production companies: Paris-Cannes Productions; TIT Filmproduktion GmbH
- Distributed by: Lugo Films (France)
- Release date: 14 January 1976 (France)
- Running time: 105 minutes
- Countries: France; West Germany
- Language: English
- Box office: 44,373 admissions (France)

Vortex (French: Blondy; also known as Blondie and Germacide) is a 1976 erotic thriller film directed by Sergio Gobbi from a screenplay he co-wrote with Catherine Arley and Lucio Attinelli, based on Arley's 1973 novel Duel au premier sang. It stars Bibi Andersson, Catherine Jourdan, Mathieu Carrière, and Rod Taylor.

The film was shot in Paris in September 1975.
