= Alain Robbe-Grillet =

French writer and film director (1922–2008)

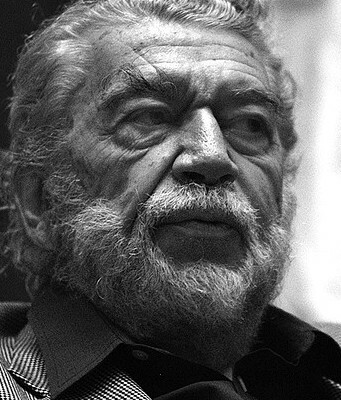
- Robbe-Grillet in 2006
- Born: 18 August 1922; Brest, Finistère, France
- Died: 18 February 2008 (aged 85); Caen, Calvados, France
- Occupations: Writer; filmmaker
- Years active: 1953–2008
- Known for: Last Year at Marienbad; Les Gommes; La Jalousie; Djinn
- Spouse: Catherine Robbe-Grillet

Signature
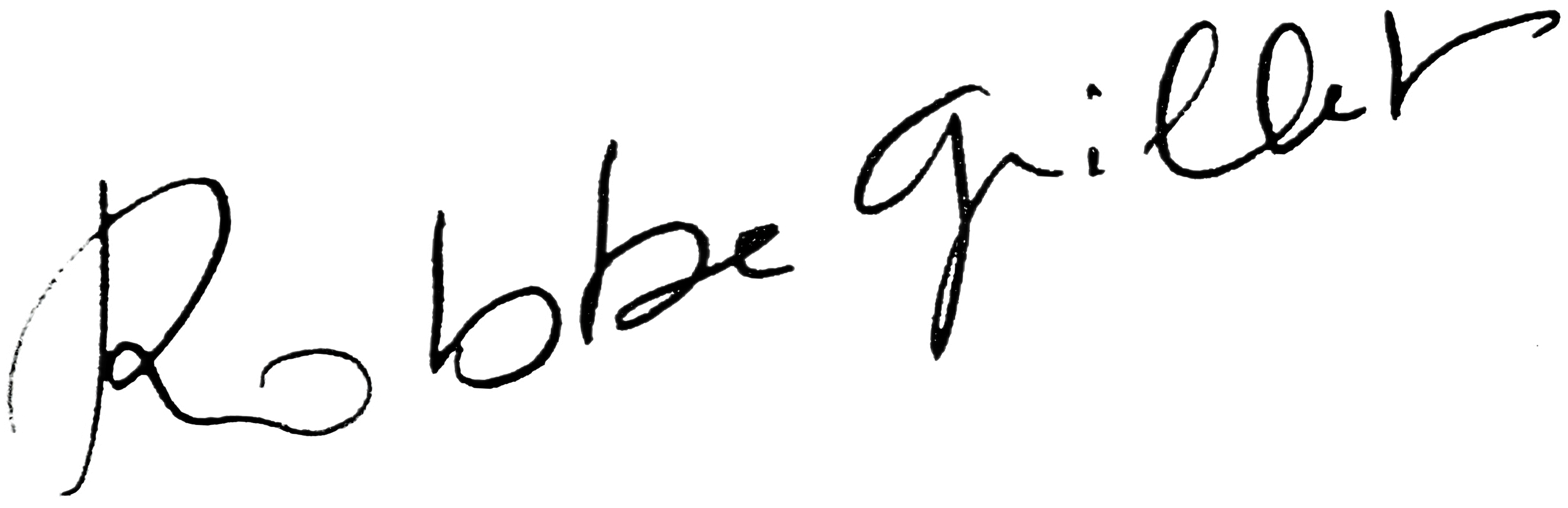

Alain Robbe-Grillet (French: [alɛ̃ ʁɔb ɡʁijɛ]; 18 August 1922 – 18 February 2008) was a French writer and filmmaker. He was one of the figures most associated with the Nouveau Roman (lit. 'new novel') trend of the 1960s, along with Nathalie Sarraute, Michel Butor and Claude Simon. Robbe-Grillet was elected a member of the Académie française on 25 March 2004, succeeding Maurice Rheims at seat No. 32. He married Catherine Robbe-Grillet (née Rstakian).

== Biography ==
Alain Robbe-Grillet was born in Brest (Finistère, France) to a family of engineers and scientists. He was trained as an agricultural engineer. During the years 1943 and 1944, he participated in compulsory labor in Nuremberg, where he worked as a machinist. The initial few months were seen by Robbe-Grillet as something of a holiday. In between the very rudimentary training he was given to operate the machinery, he had free time to go to the theatre and the opera.

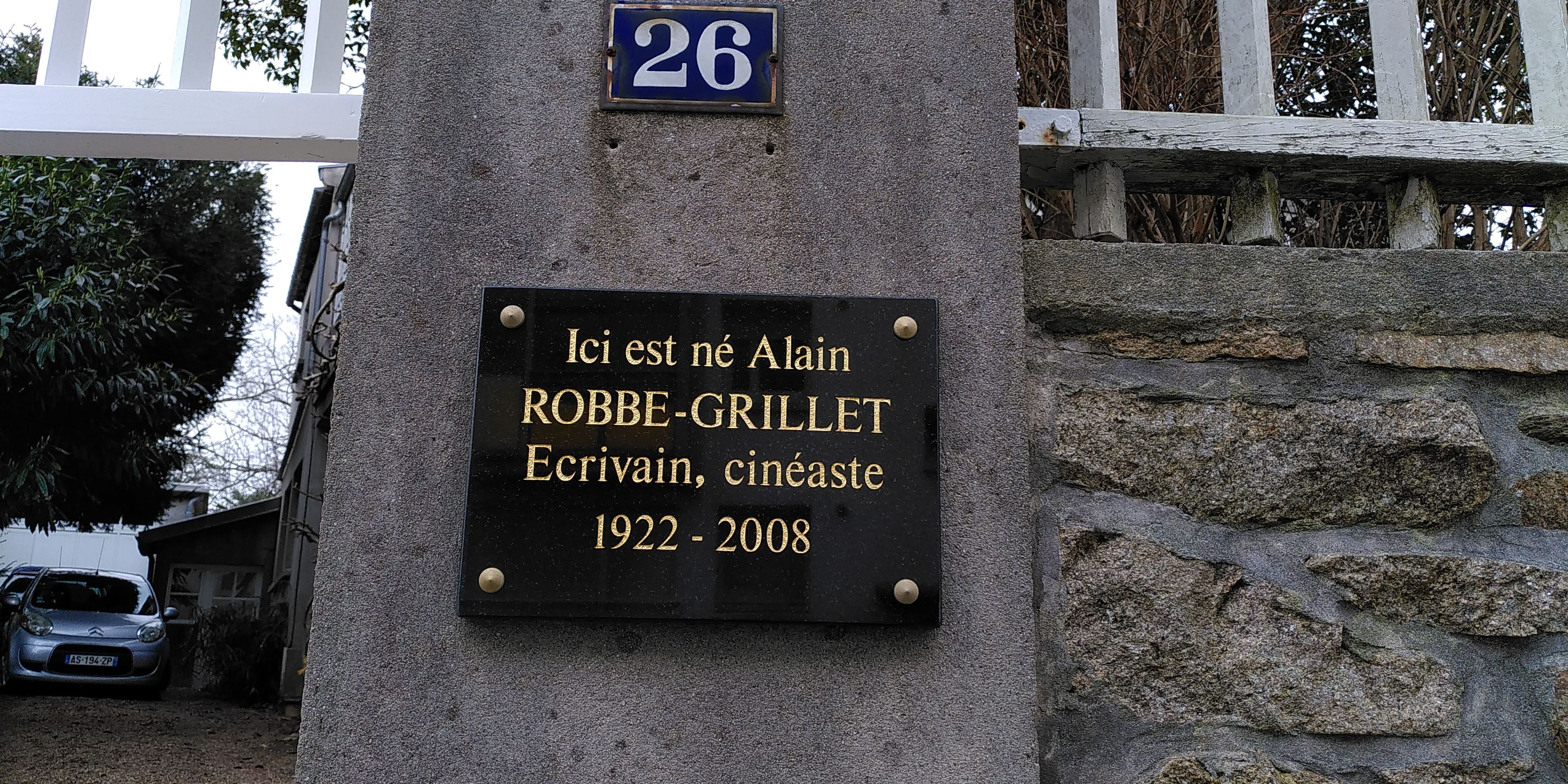
Plaque

In 1945, he completed his diploma at the National Institute of Agronomy. Later, his work as an agronomist took him to Martinique, French Guiana, Guadeloupe, and Morocco. In 1960, he was a signatory to the Manifesto of the 121 in support of the Algerian struggle for independence. He died in 2008 in Caen after succumbing to heart problems.

== Work ==
Robbe-Grillet's first published novel was The Erasers (Les Gommes), which was issued by Les Éditions de Minuit in 1953. After that, he dedicated himself full-time to his new occupation. His early work was praised by eminent critics, such as Roland Barthes and Maurice Blanchot. Around the time of his second novel, he became a literary advisor for Les Éditions de Minuit and occupied this position from 1955 until 1985. After publishing four novels, in 1961, he worked with Alain Resnais, writing the script for Last Year at Marienbad (L'Année dernière à Marienbad), and he subsequently wrote and directed his own films.

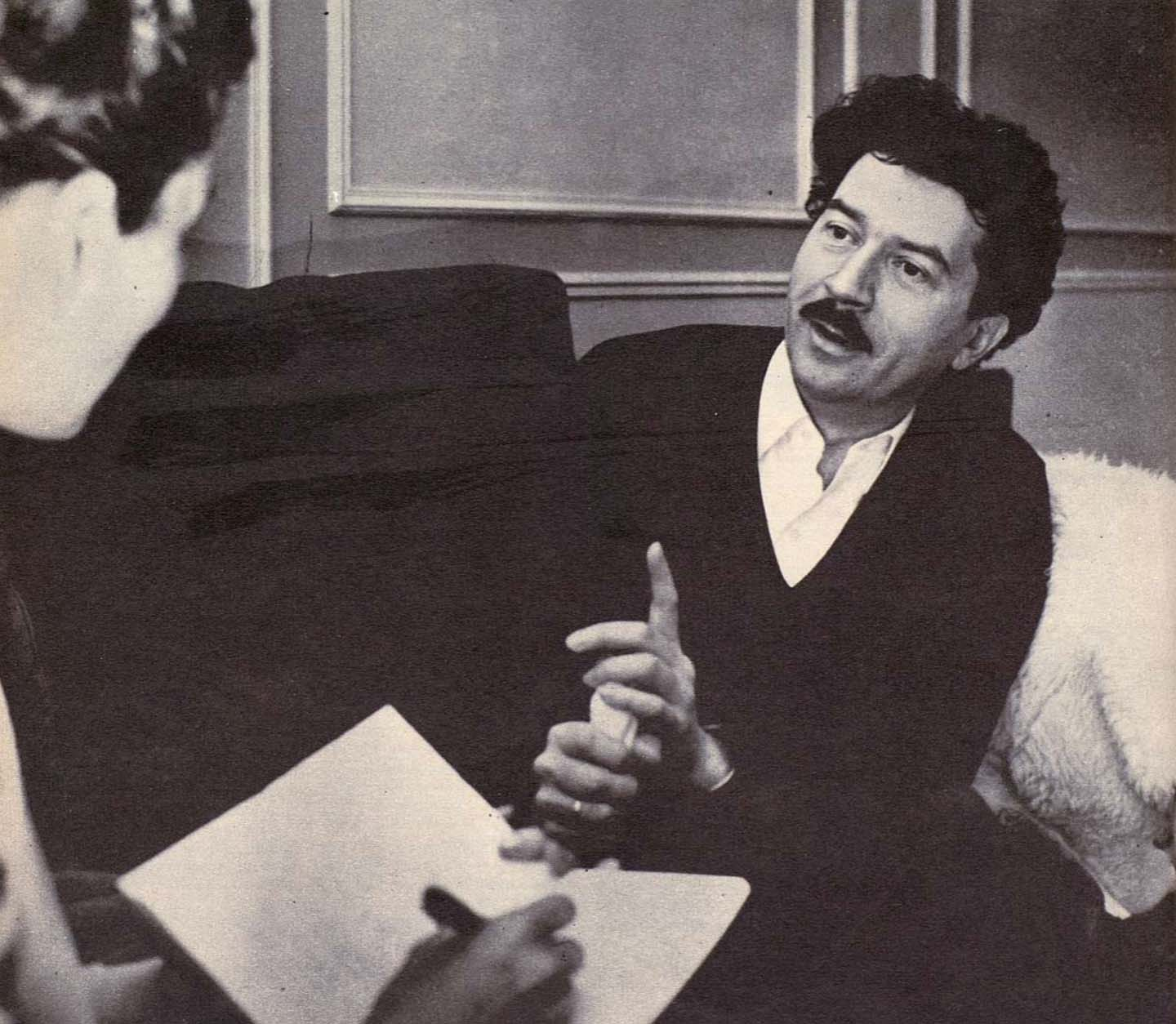
Being interviewed by Mirja Bolgár

In 1963, Robbe-Grillet published For a New Novel (Pour un Nouveau Roman), a collection of previously published theoretical writings concerning the novel. From 1966 to 1968, he was a member of the High Committee for the Defense and Expansion of French (Haut comité pour la défense et l'expansion de la langue française). In addition, Robbe-Grillet also led the Centre for Sociology of Literature (Centre de sociologie de la littérature) at the Université Libre de Bruxelles from 1980 to 1988. From 1971 to 1995, Robbe-Grillet was a professor at New York University, lecturing on his own novels.

Although Robbe-Grillet was elected to the Académie française in 2004, in his eighties, he was never formally received by the Académie because of disputes regarding the Académie's reception procedures. Robbe-Grillet both refused to prepare and submit a welcome speech in advance, preferring to improvise his speech, as well as refusing to purchase and wear the Académie's famous green tails (habit vert) and sabre, which he considered outdated.

== Style ==
His writing style has been described as "realist" or "phenomenological" (in the Husserlian sense) or "a theory of pure surface". Methodical, geometric, and often repetitive descriptions of objects replace (though often reveal) the psychology and interiority of the character. The reader must slowly piece together the story and the emotional experience of jealousy, for example, in the repetition of descriptions, the attention to odd details, and the breaks in repetitions, a method that resembles the experience of psychoanalysis in which the deeper unconscious meanings are contained in the flow and disruptions of free associations. Timelines and plots are fractured, and the resulting novel resembles the literary equivalent of a cubist painting. Yet his work is ultimately characterized by its ability to mean many things to many different people.

== Novels ==
Robbe-Grillet wrote his first novel A Regicide (Un Régicide) in 1949, but it was rejected by Gallimard, a major French publishing house, and only later published with minor corrections by his lifelong publisher Les Éditions de Minuit in 1978. His second novel, The Erasers (Les Gommes), superficially resembles a detective novel, but it contains within it a deeper structure based on the tale of Oedipus. The detective is seeking the assassin in a murder that has not yet occurred, only to discover that it is his destiny to become that assassin.

His next and most acclaimed novel is The Voyeur (Le Voyeur), first published in French in 1955 and translated into English in 1958 by Richard Howard. The Voyeur relates the story of Mathias, a traveling watch salesman who returns to the island of his youth with a desperate objective. As with many of his novels, The Voyeur revolves around an apparent murder: throughout the novel, Mathias unfolds a newspaper clipping about the details of a young girl's murder and the discovery of her body among the seaside rocks. Mathias' relationship with a dead girl, possibly that hinted at in the story, is obliquely revealed in the course of the novel so that we are never actually sure if Mathias is a killer or simply a person who fantasizes about killing. Importantly, the "actual murder," if such a thing exists, is absent from the text. The narration contains little dialogue, and an ambiguous timeline of events. Indeed, the novel's opening line is indicative of the novel's tone: "It was as if no one had heard." The Voyeur was awarded the Prix des Critiques.

Next, he wrote La Jalousie in 1957, one of his few novels to be set in a non-urban location, in this instance a banana plantation. In the first year of publication only 746 copies were sold, despite the popularity of The Voyeur. Over time, it became a great literary success and was translated into English by Richard Howard. Robbe-Grillet himself argued that the novel was constructed along the lines of an absent third-person narrator. In Robbe-Grillet's account of the novel the absent narrator, a jealous husband, silently observes the interactions of his wife (referred to only as "A...") and a neighbour, Franck. The silent narrator who never names himself (his presence is merely implied, e.g. by the number of place settings at the dinner table or deck chairs on the verandah) is extremely suspicious that A... is having an affair with Franck. Throughout the novel, the absent narrator continually replays his observations and suspicions (that is, created scenarios about A... and Franck) so much so that it becomes impossible to distinguish between 'observed' moments or 'suspicious' moments. 'Jalousie' is also translatable as Persian blinds, the horizontal shutters common in France that are usually made of wood or sometimes metal. Over the course of the novel the main character looks through his blinds repeatedly in different scenes, the 'jalousie' he looks out to the world that mutates ever so slightly each time.

In 1984 he published what he described as an intentionally traditional autobiography, entitled Le Miroir qui revient, translated into English as Ghosts in the Mirror by Jo Levy (1988).

== Films ==
Robbe-Grillet's career as a creator of fiction was not restricted to the writing of novels. For him, creating fiction in the form of films was of equal importance. His film career began when Alain Resnais chose to collaborate with him on his 1961 film Last Year at Marienbad. The film was nominated for the 1963 Academy Award for Writing Original Screenplay and won the Golden Lion when it came out in 1961. In the credits it was presented as a film equally co-authored by Robbe-Grillet and Resnais.

Robbe-Grillet launched a career as a writer-director of a series of cerebral and often sexually provocative feature films that explored similar themes to those in his literary work (e.g. Voyeurism, The Body as Text, The 'Double'). He commenced with L'Immortelle (The Immortal One) (1962) which won the coveted Louis Delluc Prize of 1962. This was followed by his most commercially successful film after Last Year at Marienbad: Trans-Europ-Express (1966) starring Jean-Louis Trintignant, who worked with Robbe-Grillet on his next four films, his French-Slovak film L'homme qui ment/Muž, ktorý luže (The Man Who Lies) (1968), L'Eden et après/Eden a potom (Eden and After) (1970), Glissements progressifs du plaisir (Progressive Slidings towards Pleasure) (1974) and Le jeu avec le feu (Playing with Fire) (1975). It was almost a decade before the appearance of his next feature film, La belle captive (The Beautiful Captive) (1983), where Robbe-Grillet enlisted the services of Henri Alekan as cinematographer. Subsequently, more than a decade passed before Robbe-Grillet got behind the lens again, this time filming a mystery thriller on a small Greek island with Fred Ward starring as the confused Frank in Un bruit qui rend fou (A Maddening Noise, aka: The Blue Villa) (1995). Robbe-Grillet was to direct one more film, Gradiva (C'est Gradiva qui vous appelle) (2006) which brought once more to the fore his preoccupation with sadism and bondage in his fiction.

== Bibliography ==
=== Fiction ===
- Un Régicide (1949)
- Les Gommes (1953) – Fénéon Prize
- Le Voyeur (1955)
- La Jalousie (1957)
- Dans le labyrinthe (1959)
- La Maison de rendez-vous (1965)
- Projet pour une révolution à New York (1970)
- La Belle Captive (1975)
- Topologie d'une cité fantôme (1976)
- Souvenirs du Triangle d'Or (1978)
- Djinn (1981)
- La Reprise (2001; published in English in 2003 as Repetition)
- Un Roman sentimental (2007)

==== Short story collection ====
- Instantanés (1962)

==== "Romanesques" ====
- Le Miroir qui revient (1985)
- Angélique ou l'enchantement (1988)
- Les derniers jours de Corinthe (1994)

=== Essays ===
- Pour un Nouveau Roman (1963)
- Le voyageur, essais et entretiens (2001)
- Préface à Une Vie d'Écrivain (2005)

=== Filmworks available as ciné-novels ===
- 1960: L'Année dernière à Marienbad Les Éditions de Minuit ASIN: B005MP60NO
- 1963: L'Immortelle Les Éditions de Minuit ASIN: B0014Q17Z6
- 1974: Glissements progressifs du plaisir Les Éditions de Minuit ASIN:B0048IY7OK
- 2002: C'est Gradiva qui vous appelle Les Éditions de Minuit ISBN 978-2-7073-1793-3

=== Other works ===
In 1975, Robbe-Grillet published a book entitled La Belle Captive. The book is referred to as a "roman" (novel) and is illustrated with 77 paintings by Magritte interspersed with discourse written by Robbe-Grillet. The eponymous film La Belle captive, written and directed by Robbe-Grillet, was released in 1983.

In 1981, Robbe-Grillet and Yvone Lenard published Le Rendez-vous (The Meeting) in the United States as a textbook for intermediary French courses that included an original novel and grammar exercises. As Trinity College professor Sara Kippur explains, "As a language-learning tool, Le rendez-vous advanced a systematic approach that introduced students to increasing complex verb tenses and grammatical constructions." Le Rendez-vous was released in the United States a month before Djinn was released in France. The text of Djinn was identical to that of Le Rendez-vous absent the grammar exercise and with the addition of the prologue and epilogue.

=== Collaborations ===
- Temple aux miroirs, with Irina Ionesco (1977)

== Filmography ==
- L'immortelle (1963)
- Trans-Europ-Express (1966)
- L'homme qui ment / Muž, ktorý luže (1968)
- L'Eden et après / Eden a potom (1970)
- N. a pris les dés... (1971)
- Glissements progressifs du plaisir (1974), starring Anicée Alvina, Olga Georges-Picot, Michel Lonsdale, Jean Martin; editor Bob Wade; producer Roger Boublil
- Le jeu avec le feu / Playing with Fire (1975)
- La belle captive (1983), starring: Daniel Mesguich, Gabrielle Lazure, Cyrielle Claire, Daniel Emilfork, Roland Dubillard, François Chaumette
- The Blue Villa (1995), starring: Fred Ward, Arielle Dombasle
- C'est Gradiva qui vous appelle (2006), starring: James Wilby, Arielle Dombasle, Dany Verissimo

== See also ==
- Metafiction – Genre of fiction about fiction
