= Cyrielle Clair =

French actress (born 1955)

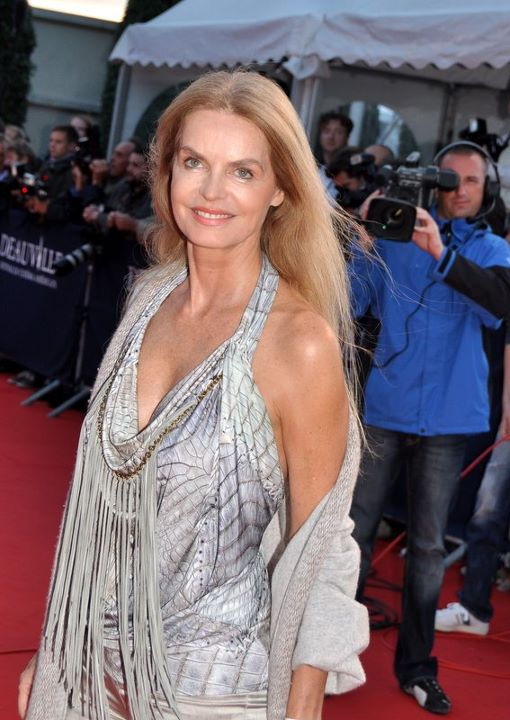
- Clair in 2011
- Born: 1 December 1955 (age 70); Paris, France
- Occupation: Actress
- Years active: 1978–present

Cyrielle Clair (born 1 December 1955) is a French actress. She has appeared in 55 films and television shows since 1978. Clair starred in the 1983 film La Belle captive, which was entered into the 33rd Berlin International Film Festival.

== Selected filmography ==
- Le Professionnel (1981) as Alice Ancelin
- La Belle captive (1983) as Sara Zeitgeist
- Sword of the Valiant (1984) as Linet
- Code Name: Emerald (1985) as Claire Jouvet
- Väter und Söhne – Eine deutsche Tragödie (1986) as Anni
- Sword of Gideon (1986) as Jeanette Von Lesseps
- Counterstrike (1990–1991) as Nicole Beaumont
- Joséphine, ange gardien (2003) as Catherine (Episode: "Belle à tout prix")
- San-Antonio as Mrs Chapon
- Triple Agent (2004) as Maguy
- Frantz (2016)
- Ad Vitam (2025)

== Decorations ==
- Commander of the Order of Arts and Letters (2016)
