= Fernanda Botelho (writer) =

Portuguese writer

Fernanda Botelho (December 1, 1926 – December 11, 2007) was a Portuguese poet and author.

She was born in Oporto and was educated at the University of Coimbra and the University of Lisbon. In 1951, she published her first collection of poems As Coordenadas Líricas (Lyrical coordinates). This was followed by a series of novels. Her fiction was influenced by the French nouveau roman.

Botelho died in Lisbon at the age of 74. She died at her home in Lisbon on December 11, 2007 and was buried in the Benfica cemetery.

== Selected works ==
Sources:

- Ângulo Raso (Flat angle), novel (1957)
- Calendário Privado (Private calendar), novel (1958)
- A Gata e a Fábula (The cat and the fable), novel (1960), received the Prémio Camilo Castelo Branco
- Xerazade e os outros (Scheherazade and the Others), novel (1964)
- Lourenço É Nome de Jogral (Lourenço is a minstrel's name) (1971)
- Esta Noite Sonhei com Brughel (Tonight I dream of Breughel), novel (1987)
- As Contadoras de Historias (The Women Storytellers) (1998), received the Portuguese Writers Association Prize
