= Successive Slidings of Pleasure =

1974 film

- Film poster
- Directed by: Alain Robbe-Grillet
- Written by: Alain Robbe-Grillet
- Produced by: André Cohen; Marcel Sébaoun
- Starring: Anicée Alvina
- Cinematography: Yves Lafaye
- Edited by: Bob Wade
- Production company: Cosefa Films
- Distributed by: Lira Films
- Release date: 1974 (France)
- Country: France

Successive Slidings of Pleasure (French: Glissements progressifs du plaisir) is a 1974 French art film directed by Alain Robbe-Grillet.

== Plot ==
The film delves into the surreal and demented psyche of a young woman following the murder of her partner Nora. She is incarcerated in a convent prison where her sexual and sadistic desires interrupt her sense of reality.

== Cast ==
- Anicée Alvina - The Prisoner
- Olga Georges-Picot - Nora
- Michael Lonsdale - The Judge
- Jean Martin - The Priest
- Marianne Eggerickx - Claudia
- Claude Marcault - Soeur Julia
- Maxence Mailfort - Client / Customer
- Nathalie Zeiger - Sister Maria
- Bob Wade - Fossoyeur / Gravedigger
- Jean-Louis Trintignant - The police Lieutenant
- Isabelle Huppert - Bit
- Hubert Niogret - Le photographe
- Alain Robbe-Grillet - Un passant
- Catherine Robbe-Grillet - Une soeur

== Production ==
Luc Béraud is the assistant director on the film.

== Release ==
Successive Slidings of Pleasure was released in France in 1974 where it was distributed by Lira Films.

== See also ==
- Isabelle Huppert on screen and stage
