= Two Small Bodies (play) =

Play by Neal Bell

- Original language: English
- Written by: Neal Bell
- Characters: Eileen Maloney; Lt. Brann
- Genre: Thriller
- Setting: In and around the apartment of Eileen Maloney

Premiere
- Date: 1977
- Place: Playwrights Horizons

Two Small Bodies is an American 1977 two-character thriller play by Neal Bell.

== Plot ==
A strip club hostess' two children are missing and she is questioned by a police lieutenant for days when he suspects she murdered them.

== Film ==
The play was adapted into the 1993 film Two Small Bodies by director Beth B and starring Fred Ward and Suzy Amis.
