= Ulvi Uraz =

- Born: 13 February 1921; Istanbul, Ottoman Empire
- Died: 25 May 1974 (aged 53); Istanbul, Turkey
- Occupations: Actor, Director
- Years active: 1959-1966

Ulvi Uraz (13 February 1921 – 25 May 1974) was a Turkish theater and film actor and director.

== Partial filmography ==
- Zümrüt (1959) - Ziya
- Tütün Zamanı (1959) - Bekir
- Kalpaklilar (1960)
- Denize inen sokak (1960) - Ali
- Civanmert (1960)
- Özleyis (1961)
- Tintin and the Golden Fleece (1961) - Malik
- Rüzgar Zehra (1961)
- Naylon Leyla (1961)
- Kabadayilar krali (1961)
- Günes dogmasin (1961)
- Aşk Hırsızı (1961)
- Sehvet uçurumu (1962)
- Mevlid (1962)
- Kelle koltukta (1962)
- Geçti buranin pazari (1962)
- Sahte nikah (1962)
- Kismetin en güzeli (1962)
- Rüzgarli tepe (1963)
- Menekse gözler (1963)
- Leyla ile Mecnun gibi (1963)
- Kâmil Abi (1963) - Kâmil Abi
- Disi kurt (1963) - Deli Haydar Reis
- Bir hizmetçi kizin hatira defteri (1963)
- Azrailin habercisi (1963)
- Dilberler yuvasi (1963)
- L'Immortelle (1963) - Antique Dealer
- Yakilacak kitap (1963)
- Son tren (1964)
- Manyaklar köskü (1964)
- Gel barisalim (1964)
- Yarın Bizimdir (1964) - Naci Kahraman
- Hostes hanim (1964)
- Döner Ayna (1964)
- Göklerdeki Sevgili (1966) - (final film role)
