= Woman of Straw =

1964 British crime thriller by Basil Dearden

- Original film poster
- Directed by: Basil Dearden
- Written by: Robert Muller; Stanley Mann; Michael Relph
- Based on: La Femme de Paille; 1956 novel by Catherine Arley
- Produced by: Michael Relph
- Starring: Gina Lollobrigida; Sean Connery; Ralph Richardson
- Cinematography: Otto Heller
- Edited by: John D. Guthridge
- Music by: Norman Percival
- Production company: Relph-Dearden Productions
- Distributed by: United Artists
- Release date: 28 April 1964
- Running time: 122 minutes
- Country: United Kingdom
- Language: English
- Budget: $1.7 million

Woman of Straw is a 1964 British crime thriller directed by Basil Dearden and starring Gina Lollobrigida and Sean Connery. It was written by Robert Muller and Stanley Mann, adapted from the 1954 novel La Femme de paille by Catherine Arley.

Relph called it "a beautiful looking film but a load of old bollocks really."

== Plot ==
Playboy Anthony Richmond schemes to acquire the £50 million fortune of his uncle Charles Richmond, a tyrannical, arrogant wheelchaired tycoon, by persuading Maria Marcello, the new Italian nurse he has hired, to marry the old man in exchange for one million pounds.

A sincere Maria endures the verbal and emotional abuse of Charles both at his estate and on a yacht trip in Mallorca, Spain, where they wed, and a humbled Charles changes his will to leave all his fortune to Maria, leaving only 40,000 pounds to his nephew.

After his uncle's death at the yacht one morning, both Anthony and Maria concoct a scheme to pretend he is still living as they return to the estate. Maria later becomes a murder suspect after admitting their scheme to the detectives, and later discovers that Anthony murdered his own uncle with barbiturate poison, and purposely misled Maria about Charles' last will and testament in order to trap her into the crime alone while he inherits the money after her conviction.

Detective Lomer and servant Thomas later reveal a tape recording made by Charles on his deathbed, exposing Anthony, who tries to escape. The servant Thomas pushes Charles' wheelchair towards Anthony, who falls to his death on the grand staircase. Maria is cleared of guilt by the court and inherits the estate.

== Cast ==
- Gina Lollobrigida as Maria Marcello
- Sean Connery as Anthony 'Tony' Richmond
- Ralph Richardson as Charles Richmond
- Alexander Knox as Detective Inspector Lomer
- Johnny Sekka as Thomas
- Laurence Hardy as Baynes, the butler
- Peter Madden as yacht captain
- Danny Daniels as Fenton
- Michael Goodliffe as solicitor
- Noel Howlett as assistant solicitor

== Production ==
The film was shot at Pinewood Studios, Audley End House in Saffron Walden, Essex and in Mallorca in the Balearic Islands between August and October 1963. The Mallorca footage, including much footage in a boat off the coast, was shot on location in September 1963. Gina Lollobrigida was reportedly "demanding and temperamental" during the filming, frequently clashing with Connery and Dearden.

== Critical reception ==
The Monthly Film Bulletin wrote: "With three accomplished performers, a well-handled supporting cast (led by the ever-reliable Alexander Knox), with palatial settings and a harmonious sense of colour, this run-of-the-mill melodrama could hardly fail to offer a mild thrill or two. Richardson has the eyes to penetrate one's nerve when the dark glasses of a dead man slip; and Sean Connery turns up a contemporary-type Hamlet, sneer, sable and all, capable of showing any of his prototypes how to deal with the cowardice of conscience. But this type of script needs a flamboyant sense of dramatic symbolism to bring it to life – a towering Wellesian view of a lift climbing slowly past arches and chandeliers, a more shattering use of the visual imagery of polished cars such as Losey can make, a touch of Hitchcock to sharpen suspense and turn the howl of a dog into something inhuman instead of noises off. Any film of such glamorous pretensions cannot fail to evoke memories of what can be done with similar material. Even Beethoven echoing from yacht to shore fails to carry the titanic irony of Richmond's necromantic homecoming, and the reason lies, as so often in British films, in a reluctant approach to the theme."

In The New York Times, Eugene Archer wrote, "what could be more archaic than the sight of James Bond himself, Sean Connery, stalking glumly through the very type of old-fashioned thriller he usually mocks? That is exactly what we have in "Woman of Straw," and you can be certain that Mr. Connery did not look one bit more unhappy than yesterday's audience at the Criterion, where the hapless British film crept into town. For, despite the fancy trappings laid on by the respected old producer-director team of Michael Relph and Basil Dearden, this handsomely colored exercise is the kind of pseudo-Victorian nonsense that Alfred Hitchcock long ago laid to rest".
