= Neal Bell =

American playwright and screenwriter

- Born: United States
- Occupations: Playwright, screenwriter
- Writing career
- Genres: Drama, thriller
- Notable work: Two Small Bodies

Neal Bell is an American playwright and screenwriter. Bell has written such plays as the thriller Two Small Bodies, as well as co-writing the screenplay for the Two Small Bodies film adaptation.

Bell has written other plays such as On the Bum, Somewhere in the Pacific, Monster, Operation Midnight Climax, Therese Raquin and Spatter Pattern (Or, How I Got Away With It).
