= Four Eyes and Six Guns =

1992 film by Piers Haggard

- Written by: Leon Prochnik
- Directed by: Piers Haggard
- Starring: Judge Reinhold; Patricia Clarkson; Dan Hedaya
- Music by: David Shire
- Country of origin: United States
- Original language: English

Production
- Cinematography: Anthony B. Richmond
- Editor: Trudy Ship
- Running time: 92 minutes
- Production companies: Firebrand Productions; Turner Pictures

Original release
- Release: December 7, 1992

Four Eyes and Six Guns is a 1992 Western comedy film starring Judge Reinhold, Patricia Clarkson and Fred Ward. It includes guest roles by Dan Hedaya, M. Emmet Walsh, Jon Gries, Austin Pendleton and others.

== Plot ==
Earnest Allbright (Judge Reinhold) opens his eyeglass store in what he thinks is a thriving community, but soon discovers that his store is just a shabby shack in Tombstone, Arizona. The town's Doom Brothers are trouble for everybody including Wyatt Earp (Fred Ward), the sheriff. Earnest uses his own special brand of short-sighted shooting to help Wyatt rid the town of its worst citizens and live in peace.

== Cast ==
- Judge Reinhold as Earnest Allbright
- Patricia Clarkson as Lucy Laughton
- Fred Ward as Wyatt Earp
- John Schuck as Charlie Winniger
- Jon Gries as Deputy Elmo
- M. Emmet Walsh as Mayor Thornbush
- William Duff-Griffin as Mr. Laughton
- Jake Dengel as 'Kid' O'Banion
- Richard Grover as Jim Bryer
- Shane McCabe as Doc Wilson
- Mildred Brion as Mrs. Whitney
- Dan Hedaya as Lester Doom
- Dennis Burkley as Luke Doom
- Neal Thomas as Leroy Doom
- Billy Joe Patton as Leander Doom
- Bill Getzwiller as Len Doom
- Forry Smith as Lorne Doom
- Ann Risley as Saloon Hostess
- Walter Lipsky as Preacher
- Douglas Deane as Undertaker
- Mike Casper as Butcher
- Austin Pendleton as Mustached Passenger
