= Circus (2000 film) =

2000 film by Rob Walker

- Theatrical release poster
- Directed by: Rob Walker
- Written by: David Logan
- Produced by: James Gibb; Alan Latham
- Starring: John Hannah; Famke Janssen; Peter Stormare; Brian Conley; Tom Lister Jr. Amanda Donohoe; Fred Ward; Eddie Izzard
- Cinematography: Ben Seresin
- Edited by: Oral Norrie Ottey
- Music by: Simon Boswell
- Production companies: Columbia Pictures; Circus Pictures; Film Development Corporation
- Distributed by: Sony Pictures Releasing
- Release dates: 5 May 2000 (United Kingdom); 15 September 2000 (United States)
- Running time: 92 minutes
- Countries: United Kingdom; United States
- Language: English

Circus is a 2000 neo noir crime film directed by Rob Walker and written by David Logan. The movie stars John Hannah, Famke Janssen, Peter Stormare, Brian Conley, Fred Ward and Eddie Izzard. It was released in the United Kingdom on 5 May 2000 and in the United States on 15 September 2000 by Columbia Pictures.

== Plot ==
Con artists Leo and Lily are partners both in work and in life. Lily wants to get out of the racket and settle down in a nice place somewhere far away. Leo agrees, saying that within a week they should have enough to leave for good.

Leo's cousin Bruno is having a problem with his casino losing money. He wants Leo to run it. But he hates Leo and wants to get rid of him.

Further complicating Leo's life is Julius who has asked Leo to kill his wife, Gloria. Only when it comes time to be paid, Julius, who has Leo committing the murder on tape, confesses he does not have a wife; he paid a woman to pretend to be his wife. Julius wants 500,000 in pounds, otherwise, he will release the tape to the authorities.

Then Moose shows up and he is looking for a woman who is the love of his life. Her name is Gloria. He asks if Leo could help him find her and Leo reluctantly agrees.

Finally, there's Troy, a loan shark. Leo owes him a lot of money, but he has lost it all at the track. Troy is getting increasingly impatient and violent as he does not like to be kept waiting on his money.

Evidence is piling up that Lily is working a con on Leo. With all these problems, it does not look as if Leo will survive the week.

Bruno's in trouble with the Inland Revenue, so his accountant, Julius, comes up with an idea to con Lily by turning all of Bruno's shipping company over to her, while Bruno pockets a $20 million. Only the problem is that Leo has got to Julius first and worked out a con of his own. Together Julius and Leo staged Gloria's murder.

Leo goes to meet Julius with the blackmail money. Bruno has men with guns waiting, but Moose shows up to even out the fight. A bloodbath ensues and Julius, the only survivor, tells the tale to Bruno.

Only Leo is not dead, and he leaves a recording that Lily finds and then shows to Bruno. Leo figured out that Lily was conning him, and he confesses that he stole Bruno's money. An enraged Lily and Bruno go to find Julius and catch him as he is splitting town. But then Leo shows up wanting to kill Bruno.

Bruno says that Leo cannot possibly kill him because he would have to kill his wife also. Reluctantly Leo agrees, and shoots Lily. Then he convinces Julius that the only way they can be partners is if he kills Bruno, so that they have a murder each on their hands. Julius does not mean to, but the gun goes off and Bruno is dead.

During their getaway, Julius begins to feel odd. Leo confesses that he slipped a sedative into Julius' drink. He leaves a drugged Julius by the side of the road and with the con finished he makes his way to the train station where he meets up with Lily.

== Cast ==
- John Hannah as Leo
- Famke Janssen as Lily Garfield
- Peter Stormare as Julius
- Eddie Izzard as Troy
- Fred Ward as Elmo
- Brian Conley as Bruno
- Tom Lister Jr. as "Moose"
- Amanda Donohoe as Gloria
- Ian Burfield as Caspar
- Neil Stuke as Roscoe
- Michael Attwell as Magnus
- Jason Watkins as Dom
- Christopher Biggins as Arnie

In addition, Hinda Hicks has a cameo appearance as Kelly, a jazz singer.

== Reception ==
On the review aggregator website Rotten Tomatoes, 9% of 11 critics' reviews are positive, with an average rating of 4.7/10.
