= The Blue Villa =

Un bruit qui rend fou
- Directed by: Dimitri de Clercq (Credited as Dimitri Duclerq).
- Written by: Alain Robbe-Grillet (Scenario and dialogue).
- Produced by: Jaques de Clercq; Domenique Fobe; Gerard Ruey; Jerome Paillard; Stephen Beckner; Jaqueline Pierreux
- Starring: Fred Ward; Arielle Dombasle; Sandrine Le Berre; Charles Tordjman; Dimitris Poulikakos; Michalis Maniatis; Christian Maillet
- Distributed by: Nomad Films
- Release date: 17 February 1995 (Berlin International Film Festival)
- Running time: 100 minutes
- Country: France
- Language: French
- Budget: 2,700,000 BEF (= 600,000 $)

The Blue Villa (French title: Un bruit qui rend fou, A noise that renders one crazy or A maddening noise) is a 1995 French crime thriller film, with a scenario and dialogue by Alain Robbe-Grillet, direction credits going to Dimiti Duclerq, and production credits attributed to Jean Duclerq. The film stars Fred Ward and Arielle Dombasle. It was entered into the 45th Berlin International Film Festival.

== Plot ==
Living on an isolated Greek island are a few native Greeks; several Chinese who spend their days playing mahjong; Nordmann, a boozy screenwriter; and seductive Sarah la-Blonde, the madam at the Blue Villa, the town whorehouse, in which Sarah hides Santa, alias Lotus Blossom. Sarah is teaching Santa to sing an aria from Wagner. One day, Frank arrives on the island. At first, he does not speak and appears to be looking for something or someone. It is later learned that he was involved in the supposed death of Santa, who just might be Nordmann's daughter. It is up to the local police chief, Thieu, to figure out what parts of the story are true and what parts are fiction.

== Cast ==
- Fred Ward - Frank
- Arielle Dombasle - Sarah la-Blonde
- Charles Tordjman - Edouard 'Nord' Nordmann
- Sandrine Le Berre - Santa
- Dimitris Poulikakos - Police chief Thieu
- Christian Maillet - The father
- Muriel Jacobs - Kim
- Michalis Maniatis - Mars
