= The Chaos Factor =

- Directed by: Terry Cunningham
- Written by: Terry Cunningham
- Starring: Antonio Sabàto Jr. Fred Ward; R. Lee Ermey; Kelly Rutherford; Michael Green
- Cinematography: Jacques Haitkin
- Music by: Alex Wilkinson
- Distributed by: Ascot Video; Emerald, PM Entertainment Group
- Release date: February 16, 2000
- Running time: 96 minutes
- Country: United States
- Language: English

The Chaos Factor is a 2000 action-thriller film starring Antonio Sabàto Jr. and Fred Ward.

== Plot ==
In this military thriller, intelligence officer Jack Poynt (Antonio Sabàto Jr.) discovers evidence of a CIA-backed raid on a medical facility in Cambodia in 1972, which led to the torture and killing of a number of civilians. Poynt decides it's high time that the men responsible were exposed and brought to justice, but the deeper he digs in search of the truth, the more he finds himself in danger.

== Cast ==
The Chaos Factor also stars Fred Ward, R. Lee Ermey, and Kelly Rutherford.
