= Ida Rapaičová =

Slovak actress and politician

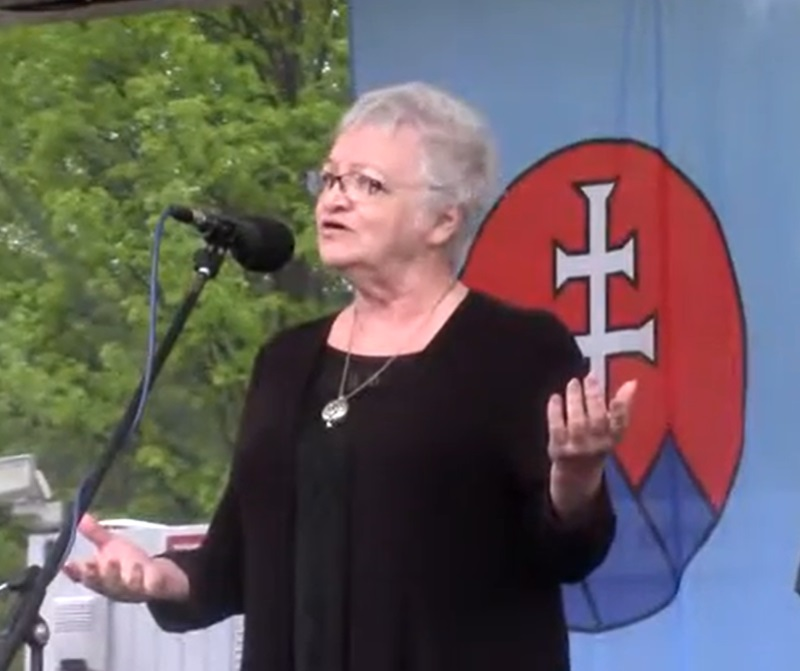
- Ida Rapaičová (2026)

Member of the National Council
- In office 3 November 1994 – 29 October 1998

Personal details
- Born: 22 August 1943 (age 82) Bratislava, Slovak Republic
- Party: Movement for a Democratic Slovakia
- Children: 2
- Education: Academy of Performing Arts in Bratislava

Ida Rapaičová (born 22 August 1943 in Bratislava) is a Slovak actress and former politician. She graduated in acting from the Academy of Performing Arts in Bratislava in 1967. Since graduation, she has been an actress of the New Scene theatre. In addition to theatre acting, she starred in many popular Slovak movies and hosted a variety of radio shows. In 1994-1998 she served as a member of the National Council, representing the Movement for a Democratic Slovakia. Following the end of her mandate, she quit politics and returned full-time to acting.

In 2013, she received Pribina Cross 2nd class from the President of Slovakia Ivan Gašparovič for her contributions to the development of Slovak culture.

Rapaičová has a son and a daughter.
