= Pour un nouveau roman =

Pour un nouveau roman (translated as For a New Novel (US), Towards a New Novel (UK)) is a 1963 collection of theoretical writings by French author Alain Robbe-Grillet.

== Overview ==
Published by Les Éditions de Minuit, the articles which constitute the book had been published between 1955 and 1963 in a number of French publications, and some were revised prior to inclusion in the book.

In it, Robbe-Grillet argues (with reference to his own novels and those of such prominent modernist writers as Proust and Samuel Beckett) that the novel form must be re-imagined by each generation. He takes issue with the common idea that the 19th century bourgeois novel (exemplified by Balzac) is the benchmark by which all novels must be judged. After all, he argues, each new form of artistic expression was once new and strange. It is the obligation of the artist to create new and strange artworks which, in turn, create reference points to judge future artworks (and which will by necessity be useless to do so). Controversially, he argues against "several obsolete notions", such as character, story, and depth.

The English translation of the collection by Richard Howard was originally published in the US by Grove Press, and in the UK by Calder Publishing.

== Contents ==
- The Use of Theory
- A Future for the Novel
- On Several Obsolete Notions
- Nature, Humanism, Tragedy
- Elements of a Modern Anthology
  - Enigmas and Transparency in Raymond Roussel
  - Zeno's Sick Conscience
  - Samuel Beckett, or Presence on the Stage
  - A Novel That Invents Itself
- New Novel, New Man
- Time and Description in Fiction Today
- From Realism to Reality

== See also ==
- Nouveau roman
