= François Chaumette =

French actor

- Born: 8 September 1923; Paris, France
- Died: 27 February 1996 (aged 72); Paris, France
- Other names: Francois Chaumette, François Chaumette Sociétaire de la Comédie Française, François Chaumette sociétaire de la Comédie Française
- Occupation: Actor
- Years active: 1942–1996
- Children: Sarah Chaumette

François Chaumette (1923–1996) was a French actor.

== Filmography ==
Year	Title	Role	Notes
1942	Les Visiteurs du Soir	Gillaume - Un page	Uncredited
1952	Rayés des vivants	Momo	
1952	The Road to Damascus		
1957	Burning Fuse	L'ingénieur du son	
1957	The Ostrich Has Two Eggs	M. Marlatier, un invité de la nuit de la couture	Uncredited
1957	Retour de manivelle	Charles Babin	
1958	Thérèse Étienne	Le procureur	
1958	Le désordre et la nuit	Commissioner Janin	
1958	Christine	Wimmer	
1959	Le fauve est lâché	Paulan	
1959	Rue des prairies	Le directeur du lycée	
1959	Le Bossu	Philippe de Gonzague	
1959	Green Harvest	Un aumônier allemand	Uncredited
1959	Come Dance with Me	Joseph, l'inspecteur	
1959	Images pour Baudelaire	Récitant	Voice
1961	Cause toujours, mon lapin	Simon Robert	
1966	Galia	Wespyr	
1968	Darling Caroline	Van Kript I	
1969	Z		Voice
1973	The Inheritor	Maître Georges Theron-Maillard	
1977	Death of a Corrupt Man	Lansac	
1982	Les Maîtres du temps	Robot	Voice
1982	Un matin rouge	Vincent Sarrazac	
1983	La Belle captive	Dr. Morgentodt	
1984	Les maîtres du soleil	Thomas Lejeune	
1988	A Few Days with Me	Georges Bassompierre	
1988	La source		
1989	My Nights Are More Beautiful Than Your Days	Concierge	
1994	Parano	Le professeur Sangor	(segment "Panic-FM")
