= The Erasers =

1953 novel by Alain Robbe-Grillet

The Erasers (French: Les Gommes) is a novel by French writer Alain Robbe-Grillet, published in 1953 and earning him the Fénéon Prize the next year.

== Plot Introduction ==
In an unnamed city, someone attempts to assassinate a man, Daniel Dupont, in his home. The assassin appears to have been ordered by a terrorist group to assassinate Dupont for political reasons. After suffering only a slight bullet wound to the arm, Dupont fakes his death with the help of the shady Doctor Juard. A newly promoted investigator, Wallas, tries to find those responsible for the assassination, despite there being no body recovered by the police. The plot is based on Oedipus Rex of Sophocles.

== Characters ==
- Wallas — A special agent from the Bureau of Investigations (Bureau d'Enquêtes) who is sent to the city to investigate the (attempted) assassination of Daniel Dupont. Wallas notably resembles the assassin in physical appearance. Wallas is also in search of the ideal eraser. It is an eraser which crumbles into fine dust as it is used, leaving no residue behind on the eraser itself. Wallas has seen such an eraser before, but unfortunately the brand of the eraser was mostly rubbed off and the owner did not know the brand nor where he bought it.
- Garinati — The assassin and member of a clandestine group which has been carrying out assassinations every day at precisely 7:30pm for eight days in a row. Dupont is meant to be the ninth target. Garinati fails to kill Dupont because he neglects one step in the precisely detailed plan for the assassination. Garinati has also been tasked by Bona to monitor Wallas.
- Laurent — Chief Inspector of the city, who is all too glad to relinquish the case to Wallas. Laurent believes the "assassinations" are a conspiracy promoted by the minister, whom he believes to have a few screws loose. Laurent's dislike of the minister comes from a previous conspiracy pushed by the minister which made his police force a laughing-stock. Laurent spends the majority of the investigation telling Wallas he is wasting his time, and trying to convince himself that Dupont's death is a suicide.
- Daniel Dupont — Target of the assassination for reasons unknown. It is possible that it is because of his involvement in politics or his relation with the government and minister. Dupont survives the assassination, suffering a slight bullet-wound to the arm, but he has Doctor Juard help him to fake his death so that the assassins believe they were successful.
- Doctor Juard — A doctor of ill-repute in the village who agrees to fake Dupont's death. It is suggested that Doctor Juard is something of a "mob doctor" who has helped out the clandestine group or other criminals in the past.
- Bona — Presumed head of the clandestine group carrying out the assassinations.
- Fabius — Eccentric and famed figure of the Bureau of Investigations. In some ways he is Wallas' boss. He has reluctantly given Wallas the job because Wallas' head is a few cubic millimeters short of the required size for a special agent, and he therefore believes Wallas is doomed to fail as a special agent.

== Style ==
One element of style Les Gommes employs is the use of free indirect discourse. The narration of the plot is presented from the point of view of the different characters in the novel, sometimes switching viewpoints between paragraphs. The reader has access to the thoughts of investigators, culprits, and victims alike giving a biased, though comprehensive view of the events surrounding the assassination. This stylistic choice allows the reader to conduct their own investigation in parallel to that of Wallas and Laurent. Though the major details of the attempted assassination are known from the prologue, many important details are left out and are mentioned only as the reader and the investigation by Wallas progresses.

The other major stylistic element is the circular nature of the novel, in which actions and descriptions are repeated over and over. This circular movement (both of the plot and of descriptions within the narrative), is further highlighted by the names of the city's streets, such as Circular Boulevard, and the seemingly confusing geography of the city. The same description of Wallas and a cyclist crossing a draw-bridge is repeated multiple times, and there is one instance in which Wallas is idly walking and ends up back where he started. Wallas repeatedly intends to interview Doctor Juard, but he is continually being sidetracked and having to start the investigation over. The circular nature of the novel is also reinforced by similarities (of both appearance and actions) between the investigator Wallas the investigator and the assassin Garinati.

== Trivia ==
Susan Beschta named her 1970s punk rock band The Erasers, taking the name from the novel.
