= Fernanda Botelho (mathematician) =

American mathematician (born 1957)

- Education: PhD in mathematics, University of California at Berkeley, 1988
- Occupation(s): Mathematician and professor of mathematics
- Awards: Dunavant Professorship Prof Charles Morrey's Award Fundacao Antonio D'Almeida Prof Gomes Teixeira Award

Fernanda Maria Botelho (born 1957) is an American mathematician, a professor and the director of graduate studies and coordinator of mathematics at the University of Memphis. Botelho earned her Ph.D. in 1988 at the University of California at Berkeley, where Jenny Harrison was her doctoral advisor. Earlier she did her M.Sc. in 1985 and B.Sc. in 1981 in mathematics at the Universidade do Porto. Her research interests include functional analysis, operator theory and dynamical systems. From 2013 through 2016, she held the Dunavant Professorship at the University of Memphis.
