= The Man Who Lies =

1968 film

- Film poster
- Directed by: Alain Robbe-Grillet
- Written by: Alain Robbe-Grillet
- Produced by: Samy Halfon; Jan Tomaskovic
- Starring: Jean-Louis Trintignant
- Cinematography: Igor Luther
- Edited by: Bob Wade
- Release date: 27 March 1968
- Running time: 95 minutes
- Countries: France; Czechoslovakia
- Languages: French; Slovak

The Man Who Lies (French: L'Homme qui ment, Slovak: Muž, ktorý luže) is a 1968 French-Czechoslovak drama art film directed by Alain Robbe-Grillet. It was entered into the 18th Berlin International Film Festival, where Jean-Louis Trintignant won the Silver Bear for Best Actor award.

== Plot ==
In a small European town that had been occupied by the German Army during the Second World War a man turns up calling himself sometimes Jean and sometimes Boris, claiming that he had been active in the Resistance. He suffers flashbacks that disconcertingly reveal incompatible memories of his role, as sometimes he is the hero Jean, shot by the Germans, and sometimes he is the traitor Boris. Nobody in the town admits to remembering him, which increases his alienation and his urge to gain recognition.

In a decayed mansion he finds three secluded women: the widow of Jean, the sister of Jean, and the maid Maria. Starting with Maria, he attempts to convince them about his activities during the war, even if his accounts keep differing. Maria succumbs to his approaches and sleeps with him, as soon after does the sister. Before he can claim the widow, in the role of Boris he is apparently shot dead by an undead Jean.

== Cast ==
- Jean-Louis Trintignant as Jean Robin / Boris Varissa
- Ivan Mistrík as Jean
- Zuzana Kocúriková as Laura
- Sylvie Turbová as Sylvia
- Sylvie Bréal as Maria, the maid
- Jozef Cierny as Father
- Jozef Króner as Franz
- Dominique Prado as Lisa, the barmaid
- Dusan Blaskovic as Innkeeper
- Catherine Robbe-Grillet as Pharmacist
- Július Vasek as Vladimír
- Ivan Letko as German officer
