= Catherine Jourdan =

French actress (1948–2011)

- Born: Catherine Paule Mignon; 12 October 1948; Azay-le-Rideau, France
- Died: 18 February 2011 (aged 62); Paris, France
- Occupation: Actress
- Years active: 1967–1989

Catherine Jourdan (French pronunciation: [katʁin ʒuʁdɑ̃]; born Catherine Paule Mignon; 12 October 1948 – 18 February 2011) was a French actress. She appeared in 22 films and television shows between 1967 and 1989. She starred in the 1970 film Eden and After, which was entered into the 20th Berlin International Film Festival.

== Filmography ==
Year	Title	Role	Notes
1967	Le Samouraï	La jeune fille du vestiaire	
1968	The Girl on a Motorcycle	Catherine	
1968	Love in the Night	Nora	
1969	Amore e rabbia	Spectator #1	(segment "L'amore"), Uncredited
1969	Un merveilleux parfum d'oseille	Marianne	
1970	Eden and After	Violette	
1971	Le Petit Matin	Nina	
1971	N. a pris les dés...		
1972	Les Rendez-vous en forêt	Svea	
1973	Le mariage à la mode		
1974	The Four Charlots Musketeers	Queen Anne	
1974	The Four Charlots Musketeers 2	Queen Anne	
1975	Dehors-dedans	La jeune femme	
1976	Blondy	Blondie	
1978	Guerres civiles en France		Voice, (segment "Premier empire")
1979	Zoo zéro	Eva / The singer	
1982	Aphrodite	Valerie	
1982	Pourvoir		
1984	El diablo y la dama		
1986	L'Araignée de satin	Solange	
