= Nouveau roman =

1950s French literary movement

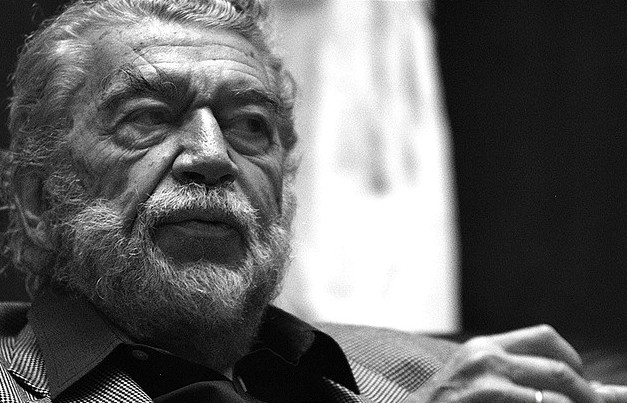
Alain Robbe-Grillet

The Nouveau Roman (French pronunciation: [nuvo ʁɔmɑ̃], "new novel") is a type of French novel in the 1950s and 60s that diverged from traditional literary genres. Émile Henriot coined the term in an article in the popular French newspaper Le Monde on May 22, 1957 to describe certain writers who experimented with style in each novel, creating an essentially new style each time.

== Overview ==
A group of writers dubbed Nouveaux Romanciers, "new novelists", emerged in the mid-1950s. Vivian Mercier considered Michel Butor, Alain Robbe-Grillet and Nathalie Sarraute to be the core of the group, becoming known through their theoretical writings about their writing practices in addition to their novels. This group has commonly been expanded by critics to include other innovative writers who had published with Les Éditions de Minuit under Jérôme Lindon, such as Samuel Beckett, Marguerite Duras, Claude Ollier, Robert Pinget and Claude Simon.

The style had different approaches but generally rejected the traditional use of chronology, plot, character, and the omniscient narrator in fiction. The Nouveau Roman authors were open to influences from writers such as Dostoevsky, Joyce, Faulkner, Proust, Woolf, Kafka, as well as the cinema.

== Theory ==
The earliest theoretical writings about the Nouveau Roman were the four essays by Nathalie Sarraute compiled in 1956, L'Ère du soupçon (The Age of Suspicion). Alain Robbe-Grillet and Michel Butor also published essays on the nature and future of the novel which were collected in Pour un Nouveau Roman (1963) and Essais sur le roman (1969), respectively.

Rejecting many of the established features of the novel to date, Robbe-Grillet regarded many earlier novelists as old-fashioned in their focus on plot, action, narrative, ideas, and character. Instead, he put forward a theory of the novel as focused on objects: the ideal nouveau roman would be an individual version and vision of things, subordinating plot and character to the details of the world rather than enlisting the world in their service.

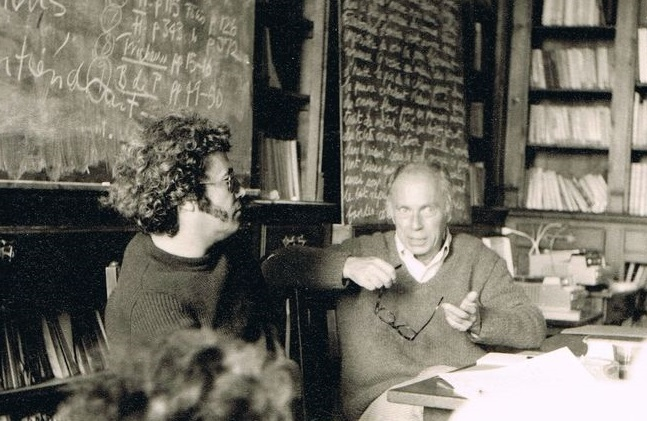
Seminar with Jean Ricardou and Claude Simon, Cerisy (France)

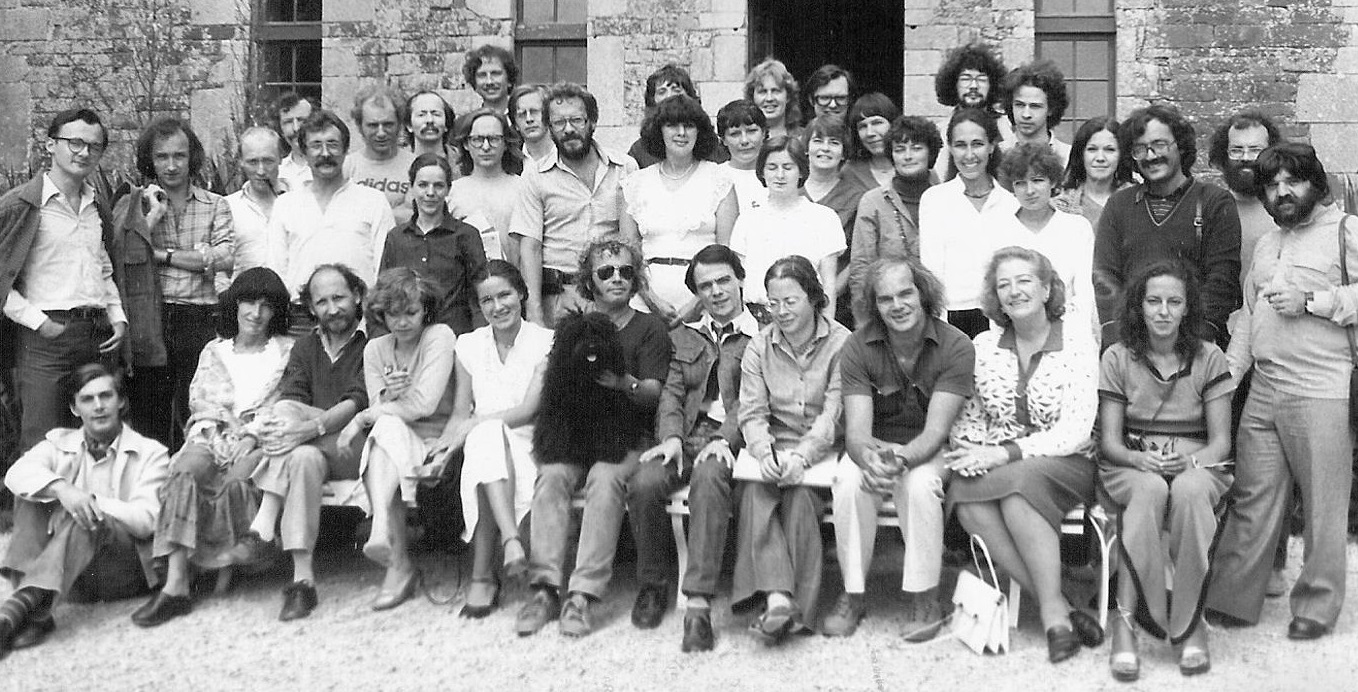
Contemporary literature workshop with Marc Avelot, Philippe Binant, Bernard Magné, Claudette Oriol-Boyer, Jean Ricardou, Cerisy (France), 1980

The Nouveau Roman literary movement and the novels themselves were further theorized by Jean Ricardou, who in addition to his theoretical works (e.g., Problèmes du Nouveau Roman) also published nouveaux romans himself, such as L'Observatoire de Cannes (1961), La Prise de Constantinople (1965), and Les Lieux-dits (1969). He also organized, directed and published the proceedings of several conferences on the nouveau roman, including the 1971 conference and debate at Cerisy, published in two volumes: Nouveau roman : hier, aujourd’hui, which added to an understanding of the history of that period. Just before his death in 2016, he was working on a book of interviews with Amir Biglari, in which he provided an account of the Nouveau Roman movement.

== Cinema ==
The Nouveau Roman style also left its mark on the screen as writers Marguerite Duras and Alain Robbe-Grillet became involved with the Left Bank film movement (often labelled as part of the French New Wave). Their collaboration with director Alain Resnais resulted in critical successes such as Hiroshima mon amour (1958) and Last Year at Marienbad (1961). They would later go on to direct their own films.

Influenced by these films, French courses in North America during the 1960s and 1970s often included works by Nouveau Roman authors such as Alain Robbe-Grillet's La Jalousie (1957), Michel Butor's La Modification (1957), Nathalie Sarraute's Le Planetarium (1957) and Marguerite Duras' Moderato Cantabile (1958).

== List of central writers and later figures ==
=== Central writers and works ===
The following is based on the list from Les nouveaux romanciers : étude critique as well as La littérature française du XXe siècle.

- Samuel Beckett: Molloy (1951), Malone Dies (1951), The Unnamable (1953)
- Maurice Blanchot: Thomas the Obscure (1941; revised 1950)
- Michel Butor: Passing Time (1956), Changing Track (1957)
- Jean Cayrol: Foreign Bodies (1959)
- Marguerite Duras: Moderato Cantabile (1958), The Ravishing of Lol Stein (1964)
- Louis-René des Forêts: The Bavard (1946)
- Claude Mauriac: The Dinner Party (1959), The Marquise Went Out at Five (1961)
- Claude Ollier: The Mise-en-Scène (1958), Law and Order (1961)
- Robert Pinget: Graal Flibuste (1956), Monsieur Levert (1959), The Inquisitory (1962)
- Alain Robbe-Grillet: The Erasers (1953), The Voyeur (1955), Jealousy (1957)
- Nathalie Sarraute: Martereau (1953), The Planetarium (1959), The Golden Fruits (1963)
- Claude Simon: The Wind (1957), The Grass (1958), The Flanders Road (1960)

=== Parallel and later figures (1960s) ===
==== France ====
- Jean-Marie Gustave Le Clézio: The Interrogation (1963)
- Georges Perec: Things: A Story of the Sixties (1965)
- Jean Ricardou: L'Observatoire de Cannes (1961), La Prise de Constantinople (1965), Place Names (1969)
- Philippe Sollers: The Park (1961)
- Monique Wittig: The Opoponax (1964)

==== Canada ====
- Hubert Aquin: Next Episode (1965)
- Gérard Bessette: Incubation (1965)
- Jacques Godbout: L'Aquarium (1962)

==== United Kingdom ====
- Christine Brooke-Rose: Out (1964), Such (1966)
- B. S. Johnson: Trawl (1966), The Unfortunates (1969)
- Ann Quin: Berg (1964)
- Muriel Spark: The Ballad of Peckham Rye (1960)

==== Italy ====
- Italo Calvino: Cosmicomics (1965)

==== Argentina ====
- Julio Cortázar: Cronopios and Famas (1962), 62: A Model Kit (1968)

==== United States ====
The critic Benjamin Libman has argued that the Nouveau Roman exerted a profound influence upon Susan Sontag and the development of postmodern fiction in the United States.

== See also ==
- French literature
- Francophone literature
- List of French-language authors
- Antinovel

== Bibliography ==
- Baldick, Chris (2015). "Nouveau roman, le". The Oxford Dictionary of Literary Terms (Online Version) (4th ed.). Oxford University Press. ISBN 9780191783234.
- Luscans, Bernard (2008). La représentation des objets dans le nouveau nouveau roman, Chapel Hill, Université de Caroline du Nord.
- Pivato, Joseph. 'Nouveau Roman Canadien', Canadian Literature 58 (Autumn 1973) 51–60.
- Pivato, Joseph. 'Nancy Huston Meets le Nouveau Roman', Athabasca University Canadian Writers Site.
