= Fred Ward =

American actor (1942–2022)

- Ward in Tremors (1990)
- Born: Freddie Joe Ward; December 30, 1942; San Diego, California, U.S.
- Died: May 8, 2022 (aged 79); San Diego, California, U.S.
- Occupation: Actor
- Years active: 1973–2015
- Spouse(s): Carla Evonne Stewart (m. 1965; div. 1966) Silvia Ward (divorced) Marie-France Ward (m. 1995)
- Children: 1

Freddie Joe Ward (December 30, 1942 – May 8, 2022) was an American character actor. Starting with a role in an Italian television movie in 1973, he appeared in such diverse films as Escape from Alcatraz (1979), The Right Stuff (1983), Remo Williams: The Adventure Begins (1985), Tremors (1990) and Tremors 2: Aftershocks (1996), Miami Blues (1990), The Player (1992), Short Cuts (1993), Road Trip (2000), and 30 Minutes or Less (2011).

== Early life ==
Freddie Joe Ward was born in San Diego on December 30, 1942. Before acting, Ward served three years in the United States Air Force, broke his nose three times as a boxer, and worked as a lumberjack in Alaska, a janitor, and a short-order cook. He studied acting at New York's Herbert Berghof Studio and while living in Rome, he dubbed Italian movies into English and appeared in films by neorealist director Roberto Rossellini.

== Career ==
=== 1970s ===
Ward became an actor after studying at Herbert Berghof Studio and in Rome. While in Italy, he worked as a mime. Upon returning stateside in the early 1970s, Ward spent time working in experimental theatre and doing some television work. He made his first American film appearance playing a cowboy in Hearts of the West (1975). His first major role came in the Clint Eastwood vehicle Escape from Alcatraz (1979) as fellow escapee John Anglin.

=== 1980s ===
Ward played a violent National Guardsman in Walter Hill's Southern Comfort (1981). His first starring role in a motion picture was Timerider: The Adventure of Lyle Swann (1982). He then starred as astronaut Gus Grissom in The Right Stuff, in the action movie Uncommon Valor with Gene Hackman, and in the drama Silkwood (all 1983).

After co-starring roles in Swing Shift (1984) and Secret Admirer (1985), Ward played the title hero in the action movie Remo Williams: The Adventure Begins, which was directed by Guy Hamilton. The film was supposed to be the first of a series based on The Destroyer series of novels. Though the movie was well promoted and he appeared on several movie magazine covers, it only grossed $15 million.

Ward played in a few low-budget productions until he returned to major cinema in 1988 as a cop in Off Limits, as Roone Dimmick in Big Business, and the father of Keanu Reeves' character in The Prince of Pennsylvania.

=== 1990s ===
In 1990, Ward starred as Earl Bassett in the monster movie Tremors, as the American erotic writer Henry Miller in Henry & June (with Uma Thurman), and as cop Hoke Moseley in his self-produced Miami Blues (with Alec Baldwin and Jennifer Jason Leigh). That year he also played an FBI agent in Dennis Hopper's film Catchfire.

After playing private detective H.P. Lovecraft in the 1991 HBO film Cast a Deadly Spell alongside Julianne Moore, Ward co-starred in the thriller Thunderheart, the Hollywood satire The Player, the mystery-drama Equinox and the TV western-comedy Four Eyes and Six Guns, for which he won a Cable ACE Award. He also did a cameo in Bob Roberts, starring Tim Robbins.

Ward's leading roles include Lt. Brann in the two-character-thriller Two Small Bodies, fisherman Stuart Kane in the Robert Altman film Short Cuts (for which the whole ensemble won a Golden Globe; both 1993), a dangerous criminal in the comedy Naked Gun 33 1/3: The Final Insult (1994), the sailor in the French-avant-garde-drama The Blue Villa (1995), his reprised role in Tremors II: Aftershocks and the special agent in Chain Reaction (both 1996). He also appeared as Sheriff Bud Phillips in Best Men, as Dave Reimüller in ...First Do No Harm with Meryl Streep (both 1997) and as Domenico Venier in Dangerous Beauty (1998).

=== 2000s ===
Ward was seen in many motion pictures, TV shows and videos in 2000. He starred in the action-thriller The Chaos Factor and appeared in the gangster movie Circus, the teen movie Road Trip and the horror sequel The Crow: Salvation.

In 2001, Ward was nominated for a Video Premiere Award as the best male actor for the direct-to-video-production Full Disclosure. He also co-starred in Joe Dirt, Summer Catch, Wild Iris, the mini-TV-series Dice and the comedic Corky Romano.

In 2002, Ward appeared in Sweet Home Alabama, Enough and Abandon. He had the starring role in Birdseye and signed in for the TV pilot for the drama Georgetown with Helen Mirren, but the series was never made. After roles in The Last Ride, 10.5 and Coast to Coast (all 2004) he took a short break from acting and returned as a guest in the TV series Grey's Anatomy and ER (2006 and 2007). He was next in the ensemble drama Feast of Love, the thriller Exit Speed, Management with Jennifer Aniston, The Wild Stallion DVD and as the boss Ashcroft in Armored.

Ward guest starred as Ronald Reagan in the French political thriller L'affaire Farewell (2009). He appeared in 30 Minutes or Less, guest starred in the TV series United States of Tara, In Plain Sight and Leverage in 2012. In 2013, he had a guest role in 2 Guns starring Denzel Washington and Mark Wahlberg.

== Personal life and death ==
Ward had one son, Django Ward, a singer and guitarist, from a marriage to Silvia Ward. He married Marie-France Boisselle in 1995, and lived with her in Los Angeles. They both filed for divorce in August 2013, before reconciling later that year. Ward died on May 8, 2022, at the age of 79.

== Awards ==
- 1993: Special Volpi Cup – Short Cuts (recipient)
- 1993: Golden Globe Special Ensemble Cast Award – Short Cuts (recipient)
- 1994: CableACE Award – Four Eyes and Six Guns (nominated)
- 2001: Video Premiere Award – Full Disclosure (nominated)

== Filmography ==
Year	Film	Role	Notes
1974	Ginger in the Morning	Truck Driver	
1975	Hearts of the West	Sam	Uncredited
1979	Escape from Alcatraz	John Anglin	
1979	Tilt	Lenny	
1980	Carny	Jack	
1980	Cardiac Arrest	Jamie	
1981	Southern Comfort	Corporal Lonnie Reece	
1982	Timerider: The Adventure of Lyle Swann	Lyle Swann	
1983	Silkwood	Morgan	
1983	Uncommon Valor	Wilkes	
1983	The Right Stuff	Gus Grissom	
1984	Swing Shift	Archibald 'Biscuits' Toue	
1985	Remo Williams: The Adventure Begins	Officer Samuel Edward 'Sam' Makin / CURE Agent Remo Williams	
1985	Secret Admirer	Lou Fimple	
1985	UFOria	Sheldon Bart	
1987	The Price of Life	Crouch	Short feature
1988	Catchfire	Pauling	
1988	The Prince of Pennsylvania	Gary Marshetta	
1988	Big Business	Roone Dimmick	
1988	Off Limits	Dix	
1990	Henry & June	Henry Miller	Also soundtrack
1990	Miami Blues	Sergeant Hoke Moseley	Also producer
1990	Tremors	Earl Bassett	
1991	The Dark Wind	Joe Leaphorn	
1992	The Player	Walter Stuckel	
1992	Equinox	Mr. Paris	
1992	Thunderheart	Jack Milton	
1992	Bob Roberts	Chip Daley	
1993	Short Cuts	Stuart Kane	
1993	Two Small Bodies	Lieutenant Brann	Festival event
1994	Naked Gun 33⅓: The Final Insult	Rocco Dillon	
1995	The Blue Villa (Un bruit qui rend fou)	Frank	Festival event
1996	Chain Reaction	FBI Agent Leon Ford	
1996	Tremors 2: Aftershocks	Earl Bassett	Direct-to-video
1997	Best Men	Sheriff Phillips	
1998	The Vivero Letter	Andrew Fallon	
1998	Dangerous Beauty	Domenico Venier	
1999	The Crimson Code	Randall Brooks	
2000	The Crow: Salvation	Captain John L. Book	
2000	Ropewalk	Charlie's Dad	
2000	The Chaos Factor	Max Camden	
2000	Circus	Elmo Somerset	
2000	Road Trip	Earl Edwards	
2001	Summer Catch	Sean Dunne	
2001	Corky Romano	Leo Corrigan	
2001	Joe Dirt	Cody Nunamaker	
2001	Full Disclosure	John McWhirter	
2002	Enough	Jupiter	
2002	Sweet Home Alabama	Earl Smooter	
2002	Birdseye	Nolan Sharpless	
2002	Abandon	Lieutenant Bill Stayton	
2003	Masked and Anonymous	Drunk	
2004	Funky Monkey	Don Decker	
2007	Feast of Love	'Bat'	
2008	Management	Jerry	
2008	Exit Speed	Sergeant Archie Sparks	
2009	Armored	Duncan Ashcroft	
2009	Farewell (L'affaire Farewell)	Ronald Reagan	
2009	The Wild Stallion	Frank Mills	
2011	30 Minutes or Less	The Major	
2013	2 Guns	U.S. Navy Rear Admiral Tuwey	

== Television ==
Year	Title	Role	Notes
1973	The Age of the Medici	Niccolò de' Conti	Episode: "The Power of Cosimo"
1974	Cartesius	Unknown	TV Movie
1978	Quincy, M.E.	Hostage Taker	Episode: "Even Odds" (uncredited)
1979	The Incredible Hulk	Lynch's Henchman/Marvin	2 episodes
1980	Belle Starr	Ned Christie	TV Movie
1985	American Playhouse	Royal Earle Thompson/Mr. Crouch	2 episodes
1986	Florida Straits	'Lucky' Boone	TV Movie
1987	The Hitchhiker	Luther Redmond	Episode: "Dead Heat"
1991	Cast a Deadly Spell	Detective Harry Philip Lovecraft	TV Movie
1992	Four Eyes and Six-Guns	Wyatt Earp	TV Movie
1997	...First Do No Harm	Dave Reimuller	TV Movie
1997	Gun	John Farragut	Episode: "Father John"
1998	Invasion: Earth	Major General David Reece	Miniseries
2000	Jackie Bouvier Kennedy Onassis	John 'Black Jack' Bouvier III	TV Movie
2001	Wild Iris	Errol Podubney	TV Movie
2002	Dice	Gacy/Noah Aldis	Miniseries
2003	Coast to Coast	Hal Kressler	TV Movie
2004	The Last Ride	Darryl Kurtz	TV Movie
2004	10.5	Roy Nolan, FEMA Director	Miniseries
2006	ER	Eddie Wyczenski	3 episodes
2006	Grey's Anatomy	Denny Duquette Sr.	Episode: "What I Am"
2009	United States of Tara	Frank	2 episodes
2010	In Plain Sight	Frank Jergens/Frank Jerome	Episode: "No Clemency for Old Men"
2012	Leverage	Steve Reynolds	Episode: "The D.B. Cooper Job"
2015	True Detective	Eddie Velcoro	Episodes: "Maybe Tomorrow" / "Omega Station"
