= L'Immortelle =

1963 film

- French film poster for L'Immortelle
- Directed by: Alain Robbe-Grillet
- Written by: Alain Robbe-Grillet
- Starring: Françoise Brion; Jacques Doniol-Valcroze
- Cinematography: Maurice Barry
- Edited by: Bob Wade
- Music by: Georges Delerue; Michel Fano; Tahsin Kavalcioglu
- Release date: 27 March 1963
- Running time: 101 minutes
- Countries: France; Italy; Turkey
- Language: French

L'Immortelle is a 1963 international co-produced drama film directed by Alain Robbe-Grillet, his first feature after the worldwide success of Last Year at Marienbad which he wrote. Entered into the 13th Berlin International Film Festival, it also won the Prix Louis Delluc.

Set in Istanbul, it tells the story of a withdrawn man falling hopelessly in love with an attractive and sexy woman who will not reveal her identity. While the two speak French to each other, the other characters mostly speak unsubtitled Turkish. Using a non-linear structure, intercut with memories and fantasies, neither the characters nor the viewers can be sure of what is portrayed and must reach their own understanding.

== Plot ==
Having taken a job in Istanbul, a melancholy Frenchman rents a flat overlooking the Bosphorus. He sets out to explore the city but, as he speaks only French, cannot communicate. He meets a beautiful and mysterious woman in a white convertible who speaks French as well as Turkish and is prepared to show him around. She is also ready to start a discreet affair. While they take in the sights of the city, often in deserted ruins and graveyards, they tend to be shadowed by sinister-looking men with one or more ferocious dogs. Then the woman disappears, and the Frenchman's obsession with her grows. Hunting for her all over, he finds the locals unhelpful, until he sees her one night in a crowded street. She rushes him away in her car, only to crash it as she tries to avoid one of the shadowing dogs. The Frenchman is scarcely harmed, but the woman is dead. Still obsessed with her memory, he starts a new quest to find out who she was, one possibility being a high-class prostitute. Once her car has been repaired, he buys it and crashes it on the same road, dying as well.

== Production ==
Alain Robbe-Grillet, who was one of the most successful screenwriters of the French New Wave, longed to direct a feature film, but no offers of backing were forthcoming. At length, a Belgian producer agreed to let him direct a film from his own screenplay, on condition that the film be shot in Turkey, using "blocked funds" (profits from an earlier film that could not be taken out of the country) owed to Cocinor, the French production company. Robbe-Grillet accepted this, and in his first feature film as a director, created a dreamlike, erotic fantasy.

Robbe-Grillet wrote a very detailed plan for the shooting, and wanted it followed in every detail. Both Françoise Brion and Jacques Doniol-Valcroze were friends of the director; though he had written the scenario with other actors in mind, he decided on them instead.

== Cast ==
- Françoise Brion as L, the Woman
- Jacques Doniol-Valcroze as N, the Man
- Guido Celano as M, the Stranger
- Sezer Sezin as Turkish woman
- Ulvi Uraz as Antique dealer
- Belkis Mutlu as Servant
- Catherine Blisson
- Catherine Robbe-Grillet as Catherine Sarayan
- Faik Coşkun as car-mechanic/dealer

== Release ==
From the date of its release until 2014, the film was never legally available on DVD in the English-speaking world, and circulated only in bootlegs, and in 35mm prints from the French Cultural Ministry, which loaned the film to museums and colleges from time to time. Thus, the film was almost impossible to see. However, in January 2014, the British Film Institute announced the DVD and Blu-ray release of the film, along with five other Robbe-Grillet features, as part of the box set Alain Robbe-Grillet: Six Films 1964-1974, scheduled to be released in the UK on 23 June 2014. Some of the individual titles were released in the US by Redemption in February 2014. L'Immortelle and the other films were also included in the French DVD box set Alain Robbe-Grillet - Récits cinématographiques, released in France in 2013.

Dino de Laurentiis acquired the Italian distribution rights after production, and officially, in the film's credits, L'Immortelle is listed as a French/Italian co-production, although it was shot entirely in and around Istanbul, with a mostly Turkish crew.

== Other sources ==
- Robbe-Grillet, Alain (1970) L'Immortelle: ciné-roman. Paris: Minuit
- Robbe-Grillet, Alain (1972) The Immortal One; translated by A. M. Sheridan-Smith. London: Calder & Boyars
