= Catherine Robbe-Grillet =

French writer, lifestyle dominatrix and actress

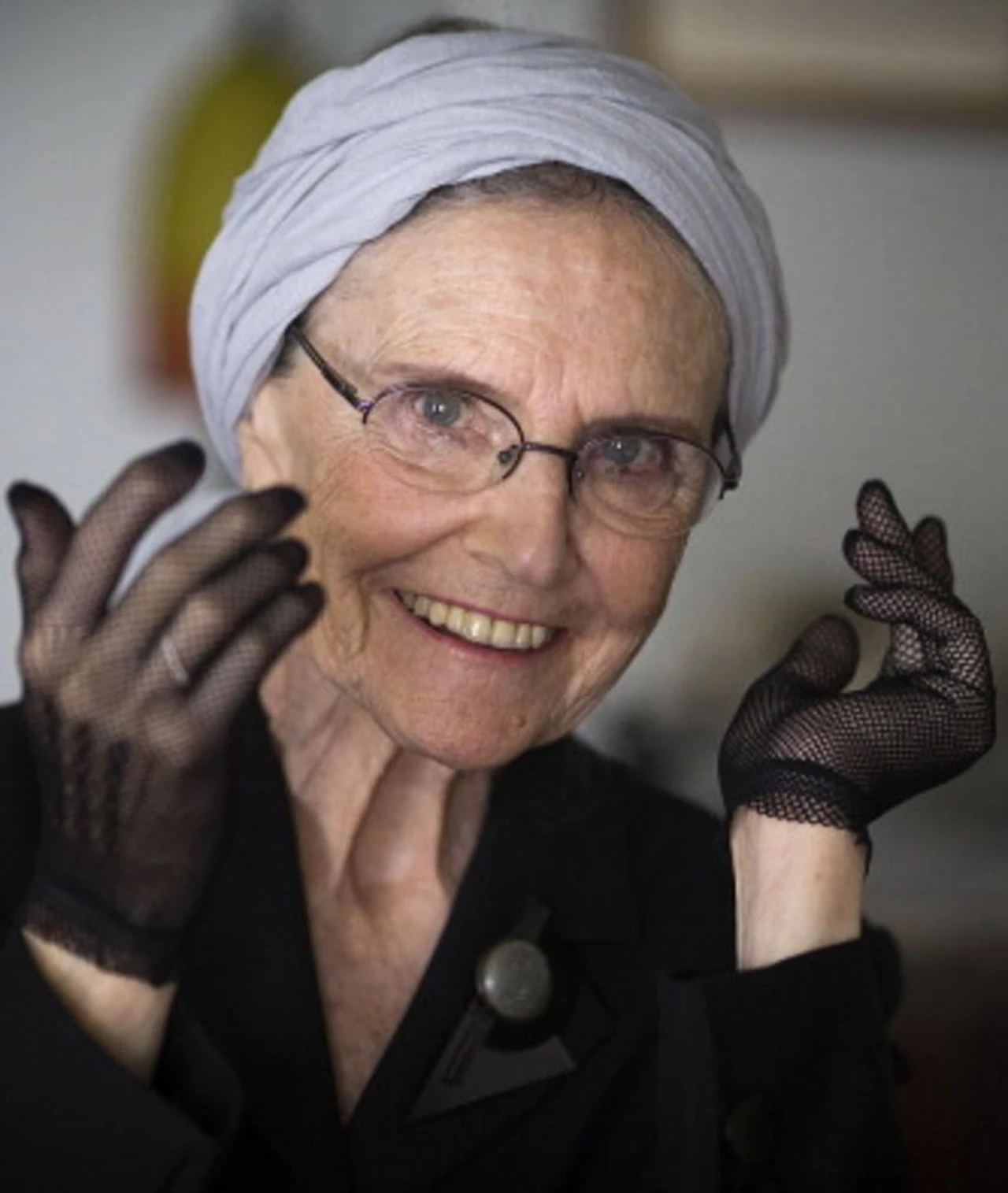
- Robbe-Grillet in 2025
- Born: Catherine Rstakian; 24 September 1930 (age 95); Paris, France
- Education: HEC Jeunes Filles
- Occupation: Writer
- Spouses: Alain Robbe-Grillet (m. 1957; died 2008) Beverly Charpentier (m. 2018)

Catherine Robbe-Grillet (French: [katʁin ʁɔb ɡʁijɛ]; née Rstakian; born 24 September 1930) is a French writer, dominatrix, and theatre and film actress, who has published sadomasochistic writings under the pseudonyms Jean de Berg and Jeanne de Berg.

== Biography ==
She was born in Paris, where she attended secondary school and high school.

L'Image, a sadomasochistic novel published in 1956 by éditions de Minuit, was written by her under the pseudonym Jean de Berg. Radley Metzger made the novel into a 1975 film, The Image, also known as The Punishment of Anne.

She is also the author of Cérémonies de femmes (ed. Grasset) (1985) written under the pseudonym Jeanne de Berg and Entretien avec Jeanne de Berg (ed. Les Impressions Nouvelles) (2002) under the name Catherine Robbe-Grillet. In 2004, she wrote, under her own name, Jeune mariée: Journal, 1957-1962 (ed. Fayard), an account of the early years of her marriage. Her most recent publication is Le Petit Carnet Perdu (March 2007, ed. Fayard) under the name of Jeanne de Berg.

She had a small part in L'Immortelle (1963) as Catherine Sarayan. Her last appearance as an actress was on stage in 2016, in Savannah Bay by Marguerite Duras, directed by Beverly Charpentier.

She married the French writer and filmmaker Alain Robbe-Grillet in Paris on 23 October 1957; he died in February 2008.

She was featured in Maya Gallus's 1997 documentary film Erotica: A Journey Into Female Sexuality. In 2014, she was the subject of a documentary film entitled The Ceremony, which examines her life as a lifestyle dominatrix and member of the BDSM (sadomasochistic) community.

== Publications ==
- L'image as Jean de Berg. Paris: Éditions de Minuit, 1956
- Cérémonies de Femmes as Jeanne de Berg. Paris: Éditions Grasset 1985 (English: Women’s Rites, 1987)
- Entretien avec Jeanne de Berg as Catherine Robbe-Grillet. Paris: Éditions les Impressions Nouvelles 2002
- Jeune mariée: journal, 1957–1962 as Catherine Robbe-Grillet. Paris: Fayard 2004
- Le Petit carnet perdu as Jeanne de Berg. Paris: Fayard 2007
- "Correspondances" as Catherine Robbe-Grillet : Fayard 2012
- "Alain" as Catherine Robbe-Grillet : Fayard 2012
