= Sea Wall =

Sea Wall or The Sea Wall may refer to:

- Seawall, a constructed coastal defence
- Sea Wall, Guyana
- The Sea Wall (novel), 1950 French novel by Marguerite Duras
- The Sea Wall (film), 2008 film based on Duras' novel

== See also ==
- This Angry Age, 1958 film based on Duras' novel
