= Manifesto of the 121 =

1960 open letter supporting Algerian independence

The Manifesto of the 121 (French: Manifeste des 121), (Note: Full title: Déclaration sur le droit à l’insoumission dans la guerre d’Algérie, 'Declaration on the right of insubordination in the Algerian War') was an open letter signed by 121 intellectuals and published on 6 September 1960 in the magazine Vérité-Liberté. It called on the French government, then headed by the Gaullist Michel Debré, and public opinion to recognise the Algerian War as a legitimate struggle for independence, denouncing the use of torture by the French army, and calling for French conscientious objectors to the conflict to be respected by the authorities.

The Declaration was drafted by Dionys Mascolo, Maurice Blanchot and Jean Schuster. It stated that the cause of the Algerians was the cause of all free men, and that the struggle was striking a decisive blow to the cause of colonialism. The vast majority of the signatories belonged to the French Left. The signatories included figures from a variety of political and cultural movements, such as Marxism, existentialism, surrealism, and a number of figures associated with the Nouveau Roman and New Wave literary and cinematic trends.

There were later signatories to the declaration, 246 in total.

== List of first signatories ==
- Arthur Adamov, writer
- Robert Antelme, writer and former deportee in the Buchenwald concentration camp
- Georges Auclair, journalist
- Jean Baby, historian
- Hélène Balfet
- Marc Barbut
- Robert Barrat
- Simone de Beauvoir, philosopher and feminist
- Jean-Louis Bedouin
- Marc Beigbeder, philosopher and journalist (close to the personalists)
- Robert Benayoun, film-maker and film critic
- Michèle Bernstein, situationist
- Maurice Blanchot, writer
- Roger Blin, actor and dramaturgist
- Arsène Bonnefous-Murat
- Geneviève Bonnefoi
- Raymond Borde
- Jean-Louis Bory, writer, journalist and film critic
- Jacques-Laurent Bost, journalist
- Pierre Boulez, composer
- Vincent Bounoure
- André Breton, surrealist
- Guy Cabanel
- Georges Condominas, anthropologist
- Alain Cuny, actor
- Jean Czarnecki
- Jean Dalsace
- Adrien Dax
- Hubert Damisch, philosopher
- Guy Debord, situationist
- Bernard Dort
- Jean Douassot
- Simone Dreyfus
- Marguerite Duras, writer
- Yves Ellouet
- Dominique Eluard
- Charles Estienne
- Louis-René des Forêts, writer
- Théodore Fraenkel
- André Frénaud, poet
- Jacques Gernet, sinologist
- Louis Gernet, philologist and sociologist
- Edouard Glissant, writer
- Anne Guérin
- Daniel Guérin, historian
- Jacques Howlett
- Édouard Jaguer, poet and art critic
- Pierre Jaouen
- Gérard Jarlot
- Robert Jaulin, ethnologist
- Alain Joubert
- Henri Krea
- Robert Lagarde
- Monique Lange
- Claude Lanzmann, film-maker
- Robert Lapoujade, painter and film maker
- Henri Lefebvre, sociologist
- Gérard Legrand
- Michel Leiris, writer and ethnologist
- Paul Lévy, mathematician
- Jérôme Lindon, publisher of Les Éditions de Minuit
- Eric Losfeld
- Robert Louzon
- Olivier de Magny, poet
- Florence Malraux
- André Mandouze, academic
- Maud Mannoni, psycho-analyst
- Jean Martin, actor
- Renée Marcel-Martinet
- Jean-Daniel Martinet
- Andrée Marty-Capgras
- Dionys Mascolo, writer
- François Maspero, editor of Maspero Ed.
- André Masson, painter
- Pierre de Massot, writer and journalist
- Jean-Jacques Mayoux
- Jehan Mayoux
- Théodore Monod, naturalist and explorer
- Marie Moscovici
- Georges Mounin
- Maurice Nadeau, publisher
- Georges Navel
- Claude Ollier, writer (Nouveau Roman)
- Hélène Parmelin, writer, journalist and art critic
- José Pierre, writer
- Marcel Péju
- André Pieyre de Mandiargues, writer
- Édouard Pignon, painter
- Bernard Pingaud
- Maurice Pons, writer
- Jean-Bertrand Pontalis, philosopher and psychoanalyst
- Jean Pouillon, ethnologist
- Madeleine Rebérioux, historian
- Denise René, art gallerist
- Alain Resnais, film-maker
- Jean-François Revel, journalist
- Paul Revel
- Alain Robbe-Grillet, writer (Nouveau Roman)
- Christiane Rochefort, writer
- Jacques-Francis Rolland
- Alfred Rosmer, trade-unionist
- Gilbert Rouget, ethnomusicologist
- Claude Roy, writer
- Françoise Sagan, writer
- Marc Saint-Saëns, tapestrist
- Nathalie Sarraute, writer
- Jean-Paul Sartre, philosopher
- Renée Saurel
- Claude Sautet, scenarist and film-maker
- Catherine Sauvage, singer and actress
- Laurent Schwartz, mathematician
- Jean Schuster
- Robert Scipion, journalist and writer
- Louis Seguin, engineer and industrialist
- Geneviève Serreau, actress
- Simone Signoret, actress
- Jean-Claude Silbermann, painter and writer
- Claude Simon, writer
- René de Solier
- D. de la Souchère
- Jean Thiercelin
- François Truffaut, film-maker
- René Tzanck
- Vercors, writer
- Jean-Pierre Vernant, historian
- Pierre Vidal-Naquet, historian
- J.-P. Vielfaure
- Claude Viseux, painter and sculptor
- Ylipe
- René Zazzo, psychologist

== See also ==
- Manifesto of the Algerian People – 1943 Algerian document
- Manifesto of the 343 – 1971 French abortion rights petition
