= Avital Inbar =

Israeli author, translator, journalist, and restaurant critic (born 1944)

Avital Inbar (Hebrew: אביטל ענבר; born September 29, 1944) is an Israeli author, translator, journalist, and restaurant critic.

== Biography ==
Avital Inbar was born in Tel Aviv, Israel. His parents, Mordechai Burstein, a native of the Kiev region and Rachel Shilensky, born in Kaunas, Lithuania, were intellectuals and polyglots. They spent much of their lives in France and were imbued in its culture.

From the age of 13 to 26 he lived in France, including two years in Marseille, where he learned French, and two years in what was at the time French Algeria, which was in the midst of a war of independence. These intense, unmediated impressions still affect his perspective of the Jewish-Palestinian conflict and internal Israeli divisions.

In Paris, he graduated high school at the Alliance Gymnasium, where he studied philosophy from the famous Emmanuel Levinas. He then earned his degree at the Paris Institute of Political Sciences.

On his return to Israel in 1970, he served as a foreign correspondent for French media, among others, for the daily Combat, founded by Albert Camus.

Since 1976, Inbar has focused on literary translation and he translated into Hebrew several major works of French literature, as well as some English titles. He traveled frequently to Paris to meet with publishers and writers and to choose titles for translation for Israeli publishers. He became friends with leading French figures, such as Marguerite Duras and Yves Montand. Altogether, Inbar has translated some 120 titles.

In 1995, together with the French-Israeli businessman Jean Frydman, he founded the Yonatan Guides Ltd, which received a franchise from the French restaurant and hotel guide Gault Millau to produce a similar guide in Israel.

Since 1997, Inbar wrote nine experiential, hedonistic, travel books dedicated to France and its regions.

He also wrote Parisian Pictures, devoted mainly to his encounters with writers and artists in France and the complex relations between France, Israel and the Jews. Since 2018 he has been focusing on Japanese Cuisine and in 2019 published Gourmand in Tokyo, dedicated to Japanese gastronomy.

== Awards ==
For his literary work and the dissemination of French culture in Israel, he received two decorations from the French government ‒ officer in the Ordre des Arts et des Lettres and officer in the Ordre des Palmes académiques. In July 2019, Inbar was conferred French citizenship, for his contribution to the influence of France and the prosperity of international economic relations.

== Published work ==
=== Books published in Hebrew ===
- Gault Millau Guide, Israel restaurant guides 1996–2003, Yonatan Guides Publisher, Tel Aviv
- The Pleasures of France, A. Nir & Modan Publishers, Tel Aviv, 1997, 410 pages
- The Pleasures of Provence, A. Nir & Avital Inbar, Tel Aviv, 2000, 448 pages
- The Pleasures of Paris, Babel, Tel Aviv, 2003, Keter, Jerusalem, 2005, 435 pages
- The Pleasures of South-Western France, Keter, Jerusalem, 2005, 316 pages
- The Pleasures of Bordeaux Wines, Keter, Jerusalem, 2005, 244 pages
- Goose à la mode of Ashkenaze, recollections of Alsace, 2011, 192 pages
- Parisian Images, digital, Mendele electronic books ltd, 2015
- Alsace – Wine, Food, Culture and Jewish Heritage, Shteinhart-Sharav, 2015. 208 pages
- The 50 Pleasures of Provence, Shteinhart-Sharav, 2017, 256 pages
- The 50 Pleasures of Provence, digital, Mendele electronic books Ltd, 2017
- A Gourmand in Tokyo, A Dining Guide, digital, Mendele electronic books Ltd, 2019.

Avital Inbar's work has been an inspiration to the book 50 Michelin Stars by Tzalak, published in Israel in 2017. The author interviewed Inbar and used insights and relative information given by him, based on his vast experience in the French culinary scene.

=== Translations ===
- Jacques Massu (1975), La vraie bataille d'Alger.
- Romain Gary/Emile Ajar (1977), La Vie devant soi Am Oved
- Victor Hugo (1978), Les Misérables, Keter.
- Albert Cohen (1978), Solal Am Oved.
- Jean Cocteau (1979), Les Enfants terribles (The Holy Terrors), Zmora-Betan-Modan.
- Patrick Modiano (1979), La rue des boutiques obscures (Missing Person), Am Oved.
- Boris Vian (1979), L'Arrache-Cœur (Heartsnatcher), Sifriat Poalim.
- Boris Vian as Vernon Sullivan (1979), J'irais cracher sur vos tombes (I Shall Spit on Your Graves), Sifriat Poalim
- Henri-Pierre Roché (1980), Jules et Jim, Keter.
- Romain Gary/ Emile Ajar (1980), Les Angoisses du roi Salomon (King Salomon), Am Oved.
- René Goscinny and Albert Uderzo (1980), Asterix le Gaulois (Asterix the Gaul) (and a few other titles), Dalia Peled.
- André Gide (1980), L'Immoraliste (The Immoralist), Massadah.
- Denis Diderot (1980), Jacques le Fataliste et son Maître (Jacques the Fatalist and his master), Sifriat Poalim, + revised digital (2017) Mendele electronic books Ltd.
- Simone Signoret (1980), La Nostalgie n'est plus ce qu'elle était (Nostalgia Isn't What It Used To Be), Am Oved.
- Jules Verne (1981), Les enfants du capitaine Grant (The Children of Captain Grant), Sifriat Poalim.
- Gaston Leroux (1981), Le mystère de la chamber jaune (Mystery of the Yellow Room), Sifriat Poalim.
- Patrick Modiano (1981), Une Jeunesse (Young Once), Zmora-Betan.
- Boris Vian (1981), L'herbe rouge (The Red Grass), Sifriat Poalim.
- André Gide (1982), La symphonie pastorale, Keter.
- André Neher (1982), David Gans (Jewish Thought and the Scientific Revolution of the 16th Century), Ruben Mass.
- Sébastien Japrisot (1982), L'été meurtrier (One Deadly Summer), Maariv.
- Henri Troyat (1982), Gorki, Massadah.
- Romain Gary (1983), Vie et mort d'Emile Ajar (Life and Death of Emile Ajar), Am Oved.
- Romain Gary (1983), Les Cerfs-Volants (The Kites), Am Oved.
- Blaise Cendrars (1983), La main coupée (The Severed Hand), Misrad Habitahon.
- Sebastien Japrisot (1983), La dame dans l'auto avec des lunettes et un fusil (The Lady in the Car with glasses and a gun), Maariv.
- Albert Cohen (1983), Mangeclous, Sifriat Poalim.
- Albert Cohen (1983), Les Valeureux, Zmora-Betan-Modan.
- André Gide (1984), Les Caves du Vatican (Lafcadio'a adventures), Am Oved.
- Guy de Maupassant (1984), Bel-Ami (Bel Ami, or The History of a Scoundrel), Maariv.
- Guy de Maupassant (1984), Boule de Suif (Butterball), Tarmil.
- Albert Simonin (1984), Touchez pas au Grisbi (Hands Off the Loot – movie title), Zmora-Betan-Modan
- Christiane Rochefort (1984), Les stances à Sophie, Maariv.
- Jules Verne (1984), Voyage au centre de la Terre (Journey to the Center of the Earth), Maariv.
- André Neher, Renée Neher (1985), Histoire biblique du people d’Israel (Biblical History of the People of Israel) (partial translation), Ruben Mass/
- Jules Verne (1985), Le tour du monde en 80 jours (Around the World in Eighty Days), Maariv - A new translation (2008), Kinneret-Zmora.
- Elisabeth Badinter (1985), L'amour en plus (Mother Love, Myth and Reality), Maariv.
- Jules Verne (1985), Cinq semaines en ballon (A Voyage in a Balloon), Maariv.
- Christiane Rochefort (1985), Le repos du guerrier (Love on a Pillow), Maariv.
- Romain Gary (1985), Clair de femme, Maariv.
- Roland Dorgelès (1985), Les Croix de bois (Wooden Crosses), Maariv.
- Patrick Modiano (1985), Villa triste Zmora-Betan-Modan.
- Patrick Modiano (1986), Dimanches d'Août (Sundays in August), Massadah.
- Romain Gary (1986), Education européenne (A European Education), Maariv.
- Marguerite Duras (1986), L'Amant (The Lover), Maariv.
- Voltaire (1987), Candide, ou l'optimisme (Candide, or Optimism) + Zadig, ou la destinée (Zadig, or Destiny), Massadah.
- Victor Hugo (1987), Bug Jargal, Maariv.
- Simone Schwarz-Bart (1987), Ti-Jean l'Horizon (Between Two Worlds), Shocken.
- Raymond Queneau (1987), Le Dimanche de la vie (The Sunday of Life), Am Oved.
- Jules Verne (1987), Michael Strogoff, Maariv.
- Marcel Pagnol (1987), Jean de Florette & Manon des Sources (Manon of the Springs), Massadah.
- Marguerite Duras (1987), La Douleur (The War), Maariv.
- Françoise Dolto (1987), Lorsque l'enfait parait, Maariv (with Aya Inbar).
- Andre Malraux (1988), Les conquérants (The Conquerors), Massadah.
- Romain Gary (1988), Chien Blanc (White Dog), Maariv.
- Romain Gary (1988), Lady L Maariv.
- Marguerite Yourcenar (1988), L'œuvre au Noir (The Abyss), Zmora-Betan-Modan.
- Alexandre Dumas (1988), Les Trois Mousquetaires (The Three Musketeers), Zmora-Betan-Modan.
- Jean-Jacques Sempé, René Goscinny (1988), Le petit Nicolas (Young Nicolas).
- Marguerite Duras (1988), Hiroshima mon amour (Hiroshima my love), Kibbutz Meuhad.
- Marguerite Duras (1988), Yeux bleus, Cheveux noirs (Blue Eyes, Black Hair), Maariv.
- Henri Troyat (1989), Chekhov, Am Oved.
- Pierre Benoit (1989), L'Atlantide (Atlantida), Kibutz Meuhad.
- Jules Verne (1990), Vingt mille lieues sous les mers (Twenty Thousands Leagues Under the Sea) Maariv.
- Philippe Djian (1991), 37.2 le matin (Betty Blue), Maariv.
- Tierno Monénembo (2005), L'ainé des orphelins (The Oldest Orphan), Maariv.
- Georges Simenon (2007), Le pendu de Saint-Pholien (The Crime of Inspector Maigret) and Un Noël de Maigret (Maigret's Christmas), Kibutz meuhad.
- Maryse Condé (2008), Moi, Tituba, sorcière Noire (I, Tituba: Black Witch of Salem), Nahar.
- Guy de Maupassant (2009), Les Dimanches d'un bourgeois de Paris (Sundays of a Bourgeois), Nahar.
- Raymond Radiguet (2010), Le diable au corps (The Devil in the Flesh), Nahar.
- Pierre Loti (2010), Les Trois Dames de la Kasbah, Nahar.
- Jean Giono (2010), Colinne (Hill of Destiny), Even Hoshen.
- Jean-Frederic Schaub (2011), Les Juifs du Roi d'Espagne - Oran 1509–1669, Tel Aviv University Publishing.
- Ousmane Sembène (2012), Les bouts de bois de Dieu (God's Bits of Wood), Ahuzat Bayit.

==== From English ====
- H. G. Wells (1979), The War of the Worlds, Keter.
- Graham Greene (1983), Monsignor Quixote, Maariv.

=== Reviews ===
- Benny Zipper, on "Les Croix de bois", Haaretz, September 6, 1985.
- Yoram Bronowski, "The Wonder Child of the Enlightenment", Haaretz, November 23, 1980.
- Kriel Gardosh (Dosh), "The Gauls Are Coming", Maariv, March 7, 1980.
- Hedda Bushes, "Pictures of Despair", "Reading Glasses", Haaretz, May 6, 1986.
- Mordechai Avishai, "Women, Finance, Politics", Maariv, December 21, 1984
- Shlomo Papirblatt, "The Lover, My Body, My Head", Yedioth Ahronoth, 1986.
- Michael Handelszalz, "Under the French Flag", Haaretz, July 28, 1987.
- Haim Pesach, "My Beloved Indo-China", at Camp, June 11, 1986.
- Yaron London, "The Price of Sin", December 7, 1982.
- Giselle Spiro, "A Village in Mid-Paris", Haaretz Books, 1987.
- Tamar Golan, "The Pain of the Other - Tolerable", Haaretz Books, June 15, 2006.
- Lena Shiloni, "How to Succeed in the Press", Haaretz, May 29, 2008.
- Oded Sverdlik, "A Tragic Meeting of Two Worlds", 1986.
- Boaz Applebaum, "a memory thing".
- Meir Schnitzer, "Blooming with a Head".
- Shlomo Papirblat, "Jewish Words in French", Yedioth Ahronoth.
- Mordechai Avishai, "Jewish Heroes between Realia and Grotesque", Maariv, 1983.
- Dina Pladot, "Everything is written in the dictionary", Maariv.
- Amira Segev, "A translator with royalties", Hasashoth, June 8, 1988.
- Hannah Kim, "The French Connection - Five Israeli Creators Received the Order of Arts and Literature This Week", Culture and Literature, Yedioth Ahronoth.
- Dalia Karpel, "No to Marcel Proust", Hair, December 13, 1985.
- Ehud Ben Ezer, "The translator is the t Sucker of the Hebrew Book Industry - Conversation with Avital Inbar", Globes, February 10, 1989.
