= The Lover (Duras novel) =

1984 autobiographical novel by Marguerite Duras

- First edition cover of L'amant
- Author: Marguerite Duras
- Original title: L'Amant
- Translator: Barbara Bray
- Language: French
- Genre: Nouveau Roman
- Publisher: Editions de Minuit
- Publication date: 1984
- Publication place: France
- English publication date: 1986
- Media type: hardback
- Pages: 148 pages
- ISBN: 2-7073-0695-9
- OCLC: 11625220
- Dewey Decimal: 843/.912 19
- LC Class: PQ2607.U8245 A626 1984

The Lover (French: L'Amant) is an autobiographical novel by Marguerite Duras, published in 1984 by Les Éditions de Minuit. It has been translated into 43 languages and was awarded the 1984 Prix Goncourt. It was adapted to film in 1992 as The Lover.

== Plot summary ==
Set against the backdrop of French Indochina, The Lover reveals the intimacies and intricacies of a clandestine romance between a pubescent girl from a financially strapped French family and an older, wealthy Chinese-Vietnamese man.

In 1929, a 15-year-old nameless girl is traveling by ferry across the Mekong Delta, returning from a holiday at her family home in the town of Sa Đéc to her boarding school in Saigon. She attracts the attention of a 27-year-old son of a Chinese business magnate, a young man of wealth and heir to a fortune. He strikes up a conversation with the girl; she accepts a ride back to town in his chauffeured limousine.

Compelled by the circumstances of her upbringing, this girl, the daughter of a bankrupt, manic depressive widow, is newly awakened to the impending and all-too-real task of making her way alone in the world. Thus, she becomes his lover, until he bows to the disapproval of his father and breaks off the affair.

For her lover, there is no question of the depth and sincerity of his love, but it is not until much later that the girl acknowledges to herself her true feelings.

== Published versions ==
There are two published versions of The Lover: one written in the form of an autobiography, without any superimposed temporal structures, as the young girl narrates in first-person; the other, called The North China Lover and released in conjunction with the film version of the work, is in film script form, in the third person, with written dialogue and without internal monologue. This second version also contains more humor than the original.

In the first version of Avital Inbar's Hebrew translation (Maariv publishers, 1986, page 11), there is an excerpt, dictated by Marguerite Duras on the phone to her translator; a section that does not appear in any other version of the book.

Barbara Bray's English translation won the Scott Moncrieff Prize and PEN/Book-of-the-Month Club Translation Prize in 1986.

== Real-life connections ==
Duras published The Lover when she was 70, 55 years after she met Léo, the Chinese man of her story (his legal name was Huỳnh Thủy Lê). She wrote about her experience in three works: The Sea Wall, The Lover, and The North China Lover.
