= Woman of Ganges =

1974 film by Marguerite Duras

- DVD cover
- Directed by: Marguerite Duras
- Written by: Marguerite Duras
- Starring: Catherine Sellers; Gérard Depardieu
- Cinematography: Bruno Nuytten
- Edited by: Nicole Lubtchansky
- Release dates: 5 January 1974; (television): 10 April 1974; (theatrical)
- Running time: 100 minutes
- Country: France
- Language: French

Woman of Ganges (French: La Femme du Gange) is a French 1974 experimental film directed by Marguerite Duras, and starring Catherine Sellers and Gérard Depardieu. The film was produced by the research department of the Office de Radiodiffusion Télévision Française (ORTF), the French state-owned television broadcaster of the time. It was first broadcast on ORTF on 5 January 1974, and later received a limited theatrical release on 10 April of the same year.

== Plot ==
Several characters walk along and around a beach. It eventually emerges that one of them is grieving a deceased lover and has returned to the places where their romance unfolded. The atmosphere leads him to imagine that she is still alive. As the figures wander through the landscape, an unrelated voice-over plays a conversation between two women.

== Cast ==
- Catherine Sellers as woman in black/traveller's wife
- Nicole Hiss as young girl/voiceover
- Gérard Depardieu as man on the beach
- Christian Baltauss as other man on the beach
- Dionys Mascolo as traveller
- Robert Bonneau as man in casino
- Rodolphe Alepuz and Véronique Alepuz as children
- Françoise Lebrun as voiceover

== Production ==
Woman of Ganges was shot in Trouville-sur-Mer, in Normandy, between 14 and 26 November 1972. The film consists of a series of static shots.

== Reception ==
When the film was released in a New York arthouse, Nora Sayre of The New York Times gave it a negative review, describing the figures on screen as "stiff as uncooked asparagus" and commenting that "There's some pretension to significant imagery here, but the result makes you want to yell or weep with boredom."

== Home media ==
The film was reissued on DVD in 2014 by Institut national de l'audiovisuel. It has also been released on streaming.
