= Jean Deschamps (actor) =

French actor (1920–2007)

Jean Deschamps (23 June 1920 – 17 September 2007) was a French stage, film and television actor and director. He was born Aymard Jean François Deschamp

== Life ==
He was born in Strenquels and died in Toulouse

== Filmography ==
=== As actor ===
==== TV ====
- 1960: Cyrano de Bergerac by Edmond Rostand, directed by Claude Barma: the comte de Guiche
- 1963: L'inspecteur Leclerc enquête by Maurice Cazeneuve: Le passé d'une femme: Lerang-Vernet
- 1972: Les Rois maudits by Maurice Druon, directed by Claude Barma: Charles de Valois
- 1978: Zola ou la conscience humaine, directed by Stellio Lorenzi: général Gonse
- 1979:
  - La Lumière des Justes, directed by Yannick Andréi: tje comte de Lambrefoux
  - Un juge, un flic by Denys de La Patellière, second season (1979), episode: Les Ravis
- 1982: Les Enquêtes du commissaire Maigret by Jean-Paul Sassy, episode: Le Voleur de Maigret: Walter Carus

==== Film ====
- 1960:
  - Moderato cantabile, by Peter Brook
  - Les Lionceaux, by Jacques Bourdon
- 1977: Pour Clémence, by Charles Belmont

== Stage ==
=== As actor ===
- 1947: Borgia by Herman Closson, directed by Claude Sainval, Comédie des Champs-Élysées
- 1950: Un homme de dieu by Gabriel Marcel, directed by François Darbon, Théâtre de l'Œuvre
- 1950: Les Princes du sang by Jean-François Noël, directed by Raymond Hermantier, Théâtre des Célestins
- 1952: L'Avare by Molière, directed by Jean Vilar, TNP Festival d'Avignon
- 1952: Nucléa by Henri Pichette, directed by Gérard Philipe & Jean Vilar, TNP Théâtre de Chaillot
- 1952: Le Prince de Hombourg by Heinrich von Kleist, directed by Jean Vilar, TNP Festival d'Avignon
- 1952: Le Cid by Corneille, directed by Jean Vilar, TNP Théâtre de Chaillot
- 1952: Lorenzaccio by Alfred de Musset, directed by Gérard Philipe, TNP Festival d'Avignon
- 1953: Dom Juan by Molière, directed by Jean Vilar, TNP Festival d'Avignon
- 1953: La Tragédie du roi Richard II by William Shakespeare, directed by Jean Vilar, TNP Festival d'Avignon
- 1953: Le Médecin malgré lui by Molière, directed by Jean-Pierre Darras, TNP Festival d'Avignon
- 1954: Ruy Blas by Victor Hugo, directed by Jean Vilar, TNP Théâtre de Chaillot
- 1954: Cinna by Corneille, directed by Jean Vilar, TNP Festival d'Avignon
- 1954: Le Prince de Hombourg by Heinrich von Kleist, directed by Jean Vilar, TNP Festival d'Avignon
- 1954: Macbeth by William Shakespeare, directed by Jean Vilar, TNP Festival d'Avignon
- 1955: Marie Tudor by Victor Hugo, directed by Jean Vilar, TNP Festival d'Avignon
- 1955: La Tragédie des Albigeois by Maurice Clavel and Jacques Panijel, directed by Raymond Hermantier, Festival de Nîmes
- 1955: Anastasia by Marcelle Maurette, directed by Jean Le Poulain, Théâtre Antoine
- 1956: Bérénice by Jean Racine, directed by Maurice Escande, Comédie-Française
- 1957: Polydora by André Gillois, directed by de l'auteur, Comédie-Française
- 1956: Cinna by Corneille, directed by Jean Vilar, TNP Festival d'Avignon
- 1956: Le Mariage de Figaro by Beaumarchais, directed by Jean Vilar, TNP Festival d'Avignon
- 1956: Le Prince de Hombourg by Heinrich von Kleist, directed by Jean Vilar, TNP Festival d'Avignon
- 1957: Polydora by André Gillois, directed by de l'auteur, Comédie-Française au Théâtre de l'Odéon
- 1958: Le Mariage de Figaro by Beaumarchais, directed by Charles Gantillon and Jacques Barral, Théâtre des Célestins
- 1958: Lorenzaccio by Alfred de Musset, directed by Gérard Philipe, TNP Festival d'Avignon
- 1960: Le Roi David by Arthur Honegger, Festival de la Cité Carcassonne
- 1960: Dom Juan by Molière, directed by Jean Deschamps, Grand Théâtre de la Cité Carcassonne
- 1960: Le Mariage de Figaro by Beaumarchais, directed by Jean Deschamps, Festival de Fréjus
- 1963: La Voyante by André Roussin, directed by Jacques Mauclair, Théâtre de la Madeleine
- 1964: Les Mouches by Jean-Paul Sartre, directed by Jean Deschamps, Festival Théâtre antique d'Arles
- 1964: L'Alouette by Jean Anouilh, directed by Jean Anouilh and Roland Piétri, Festival de la Cité Carcassonne, Festival Théâtre antique d'Arles
- 1964: Le Cid by Corneille, directed by Daniel Leveugle, Festival de la Cité Carcassonne, Théâtre antique d'Arles
- 1964: Capitaine Fracasse by Théophile Gautier, directed by Jean Deschamps, Festival de la Cité Carcassonne, Festival Théâtre antique d'Arles
- 1965: Danton ou la Mort de la République by Romain Rolland, directed by Jean Deschamps, Festival du Marais Hôtel de Béthune-Sully
- 1967: La Ville dont le prince est un enfant by Henry de Montherlant, directed by Jean Meyer, Théâtre Michel
- 1969: Jules César by William Shakespeare, directed by Jean Deschamps, Festival de la Cité Carcassonne
- 1969: Le Bossu by Paul Féval, directed by Jean Deschamps, Festival de la Cité Carcassonne
- 1969: Noces de sang by Federico García Lorca, directed by Jean Deschamps, Festival de la Cité Carcassonne
- 1970: La Ville dont le prince est un enfant by Henry de Montherlant, directed by Jean Meyer, Théâtre des Célestins
- 1970: Montserrat by Emmanuel Roblès, directed by Stellio Lorenzi, Festival de la Cité Carcassonne
- 1970: La guerre de Troie n'aura pas lieu by Jean Giraudoux, directed by Yves Kerboul, Théâtre du Midi Festival de la Cité Carcassonne
- 1971: La Reine morte by Henry de Montherlant, directed by Jean Deschamps, Festival de la Cité Carcassonne, Festival de Collioure
- 1971: La Reine morte by Henry de Montherlant, directed by Jean Meyer, Théâtre des Célestins
- 1971: Le Septième Commandement: Tu voleras un peu moins… by Dario Fo, directed by Jacques Mauclair, Théâtre national de l'Odéon
- 1972: Le Septième Commandement: Tu voleras un peu moins… de Dario Fo, directed by Jacques Mauclair, tournée
- 1974: Othello by William Shakespeare, directed by Jean Deschamps, Festival de la Cité Carcassonne
- 1977: La Ville dont le prince est un enfant by Henry de Montherlant, directed by Jean Meyer, Théâtre des Mathurins
- 1979: Danton et Robespierre by Alain Decaux, Stellio Lorenzi and Georges Soria, directed by Robert Hossein, Palais des congrès de Paris
- 1980: Talleyrand à la barre de l'histoire by André Castelot, directed by Paul-Emile Deiber, Théâtre du Palais Royal
- 1981: Le Bonheur des dames after Émile Zola, directed by Jacques Échantillon, Théâtre de la Ville, Les Tréteaux du Midi
- 1982: Sodome et Gomorrhe by Jean Giraudoux, directed by Jean-François Prévand, Théâtre de la Madeleine
- 1984: Horace by Corneille, directed by Jean-Paul Zehnacker
- 1985: Hugo l'homme qui dérange by Claude Brulé, directed by Paul-Émile Deiber, Théâtre national de l'Odéon
- 1987: Thomas More ou l'homme seul by Robert Bolt, directed by Jean-Luc Tardieu, Espace 44 Nantes
- 1993: Le Cid by Corneille, directed by Francis Huster, Théâtre Marigny

=== As director ===
- 1958: Don Gil de vert vêtu by Tirso de Molina, Festival de la Cité Carcassonne
- 1959: Mirèio by Frédéric Mistral, Festival de la Cité Carcassonne
- 1960: Dom Juan by Molière, Festival de la Cité Carcassonne
- 1960: Le Mariage de Figaro by Beaumarchais, directed with Daniel Leveugle, Festival de Fréjus
- 1964: Zoo by Vercors, TNP Théâtre de Chaillot
- 1964: Les Mouches by Jean-Paul Sartre, Festival Théâtre antique d'Arles
- 1964: Capitaine Fracasse by Théophile Gautier, Festival de la Cité Carcassonne
- 1965: Danton ou la Mort de la République by Romain Rolland, Festival du Marais Hôtel de Béthune-Sully
- 1965: Le Cid by Corneille, Festival de la Cité Carcassonne
- 1966: Les Caprices de Marianne by Alfred de Musset, Festival de la Cité Carcassonne
- 1969: Jules César by William Shakespeare, Festival de la Cité Carcassonne
- 1969: Le Bossu by Paul Féval, Festival de la Cité Carcassonne
- 1969: Noces de sang by Federico García Lorca, Festival de la Cité Carcassonne
- 1970: Cyrano de Bergerac by Edmond Rostand, Festival de la Cité Carcassonne
- 1971: La Reine morte by Henry de Montherlant, Festival de la Cité Carcassonne, Festival de Collioure
- 1972: Les Justes by Albert Camus, Festival de la Cité Carcassonne
- 1973: Les Justes by Albert Camus, Théâtre de Nice
- 1974: La Folle de Chaillot by Jean Giraudoux, tournée, Théâtre du Midi, Théâtre de Nice
- 1974: Othello by William Shakespeare, Festival de la Cité Carcassonne

== Publications ==
=== CD-rom ===
- Jean Deschamps, vagabond de théâtre, Mémoire d'Aude
- Théâtre Jean Deschamps, le 15 juillet 2006, Association Contact
- Les Rois maudits, INA-TF1

=== Discography ===
In the collections of the Encyclopédie sonore (ed. Georges Hacquard):

==== Full texts ====
- Shakespeare: La Tragédie du Roi Richard II. (2 discs) Gérard Philipe, Jean Deschamps, Georges Wilson, Daniel Sorano, Monique Chaumette, Christiane Minazzoli et la troupe du T.N.P.
- Corneille: Le Cid (2 discs) Enregistrement historique en scène: Gérard Philipe, Jean Deschamps, Jean Vilar, Georges Wilson, Silvia Monfort, Monique Chaumette et la troupe du T.N.P.
- Corneille: Horace (2 discs) Jean Deschamps, Pierre Vaneck, Fernand Ledoux, Jean Desailly, Catherine Sellers, Maria Mauban, Françoise Rosay
- Corneille: Cinna (2 discs) André Oumanski, Jean Deschamps, François Maistre, Christine Fersen
- Racine: Andromaque (2 discs) Éléonore Hirt, Maria Mauban, Jean-Pierre Aumont, Jean Deschamps, Pierre Vaneck, Fernand Ledoux
- Racine: Iphigénie (3 discs) Françoise Cingal, Silvia Monfort, Nathalie Nerval, Jean Deschamps, Jean Topart, Michel Paulin, Alexandre Rignault
- Racine: Esther (2 discs) Catherine Sellers, Nathalie Nerval, Jean Deschamps, Michel Bouquet, Pierre Blanchar. Musique (soli, chœurs et orchestre) de Jean-Baptiste Moreau [premier enregistrement]
- Racine: Athalie (3 discs) Maria Mériko, Maria Mauban, Jean Deschamps, Michel Bouquet, Didier Haudepin. Musique (soli, chœurs et orchestre) de Jean-Baptise Moreau [premier enregistrement]
- Molière: Dom Juan (2 discs) Jean Vilar, Daniel Sorano et la troupe du T.N.P. Grand Prix de l’Académie du Disque français
- Molière: Les Femmes savantes (2 disques) Françoise Rosay, Maria Mauban, Marguerite Pierry, Catherine Sellers, Rosy Varte, Fernand Ledoux, Michel Bouquet, Pierre Vaneck, Jean Deschamps
- Molière: Le Malade imaginaire (3 discs) Michel Galabru, Jean-Claude Pascal, Guy Bedos, Lucien Baroux, Jean Deschamps, Robert Vattier, Les Frères Jacques, Sophie Daumier, Maria Pacôme, Marguerite Cassan. Musique (soli, ensemble vocal, orchestre) de Marc-Antoine Charpentier
- Hugo: Ruy Blas (3 discs) Jean Deschamps, Michel Bouquet, Jacques Dacqmine, Henri Virlogeux, Marie Versini, Mary Marquet, Jeanne Fusier-Gir
- Musset: Lorenzaccio (3 discs) Enregistrement historique en scène: Gérard Philipe, Daniel Ivernel, Jean Vilar, Jean Deschamps, Georges Wilson, Daniel Sorano, Monique Chaumette, Christiane Minazzoli et la troupe du T.N.P.; musique de Maurice Jarre

==== For young people ====
- Le Roman de Renard. Daniel Sorano, Jean Deschamps et les comédiens du TNP. (music by Pierre Maillard-Verger)
- Robinson Crusoë (Defoe). Jean Deschamps, Pierre Hatet. (music by Maurice Jarre)
- Merlin et Viviane, Jean Deschamps

== Bibliography ==
- (in French) Collectif, Jean Deschamps au Festival de la Cité, vingt ans de créations à Carcassonne. Catalogue de l'exposition présenté à la Maison des Mémoires à Carcassonne du 22 juin au 16 septembre 2012. 133.p ISBN 978-2-86011-041-9
