= Gérard Jarlot =

Gérard Jarlot (1923–1966) was a French journalist, screenwriter and novelist, winner of the Prix Médicis in 1963.

Jarlot met Marguerite Duras in 1957. She dedicated the novel Moderato cantabile to him. With her, he adapted the book and wrote the dialogues for Seven Days... Seven Nights directed by Peter Brook in 1960.

In 1960, he signed the Manifesto of the 121 entitled "Declaration on the Right to draft evasion in the Algerian War".

== Work ==
=== Literature ===
- 1943: Le Périple d'Autun, short stories
- 1946: Les Armes blanches, novel (Éditions Gallimard)
- 1948: Un mauvais lieu, novel (Gallimard)
- 1963: Un chat qui aboie, novel — Prix Médicis

=== Screenplays ===
- 1964: La Chambre (telefilm) by Michel Mitrani, in collaboration with Michel Mitrani
- 1964: Sans merveille (telefilm) by Michel Mitrani
- 1961-1963 : L'Itinéraire marin by Jean Rollin, in collaboration with Marguerite Duras
- 1961: The Long Absence by Henri Colpi, in collaboration with Marguerite Duras
- 1960: Seven Days... Seven Nights by Peter Brook, in collaboration with Marguerite Duras
