= Seven Days... Seven Nights =

1960 film

- Film poster
- Directed by: Peter Brook
- Written by: Gérard Jarlot; Marguerite Duras
- Based on: Moderato cantabile 1958 novel by Marguerite Duras
- Produced by: Raoul Lévy
- Starring: Jeanne Moreau
- Cinematography: Armand Thirard
- Edited by: Albert Jurgenson
- Release dates: 25 May 1960; (France); July 1961 (UK); January 1964 (USA)
- Running time: 95 minutes
- Country: France
- Language: French
- Budget: 30 million francs
- Box office: 978,012 admissions (France)

Seven Days... Seven Nights (French: Moderato cantabile) is a 1960 French drama film directed by Peter Brook. It was entered into the 1960 Cannes Film Festival, where Jeanne Moreau won the award for Best Actress. The film is based on the 1958 novel Moderato cantabile by Marguerite Duras.

== Plot ==
Anne Desbarèdes is a young woman who is married to a wealthy businessman and lives a monotonous existence in the small commune town of Blaye. After indirectly witnessing a murder in a café, she returns to the scene of the crime the next day and meets Chauvin, who informs her in more detail about the events that took place. Mentally unbalanced, Anne begins to believe that Chauvin intends to kill her.

== Cast ==
- Jeanne Moreau as Anne Desbarèdes
- Jean-Paul Belmondo as Chauvin
- Pascale de Boysson as bar owner
- Jean Deschamps as M. Desbarèdes
- Didier Haudepin as Pierre
- Colette Régis as Miss Giraud
- Valeric Dobuzinsky as Assassin (as Valéric)

== Production ==
Marguerite Duras novella Moderato cantabile was published in 1958. Peter Brook secured the film rights and wanted to offer the lead role to Jeanne Moreau, whom he had directed in a Paris production of Cat on a Hot Tin Roof.

However, Brook's only other film, The Beggar's Opera, had been a box-office flop and he found difficulty raising money. According to a newspaper report, "after almost a year of financial, artistic and emotional blackmail and diplomacy, Raoul Levy undertook to produce the film for love."

Levy described the film as "a romantic suspense story that only uses two principals. I guess that you could say that, through the basis of a passive love story, we learn how a crime of passion was committed."

Levy wanted Simone Signoret to play the female lead, but Brook wanted Moreau, and by contract Brook, Moreau and Duras enjoyed complete artistic control. Brook admitted that this was "very unusual" but insisted that the film needed "assured and delicate" handling to succeed.

Brook says that Levy did not understand the script but "was convinced that if Brook, Moreau and Duras saw something in it, something must be there." Levy did not show the script to potential financiers; instead, he told them: "Look here, you turned down The 400 Blows because you couldn't understand the script, you turned down Hiroshima Mon Amour; well, I can't make head nor tail of this script and what's more I'm not even going to show it to you - but I want 30 million francs." Levy was able to secure the funding that he had sought.

Richard Burton was initially cast in the lead role, which he was to play in French. "This one is for art, not money," said Burton, "For a classical actor, the key thing is variation - unusual kinds of things in different media. It's all a matter of expanding one's acting range." However, Burton was forced to withdraw shortly before filming was to begin. He later claimed that this was because "French unions objected at the last minute to a British actor appearing in an all-French production, even though England's Peter Brook was the director." Jean-Paul Belmondo replaced Burton, selecting the film role instead of a competing theatre role. He would not appear on stage for over 25 years.

During filming, Belmondo was involved in an automobile accident while driving that injured Moreau's son.

== Reception ==
The film performed well at the box office in Paris but struggled elsewhere.

Duras later said that she felt that Brook had "made the film beautifully." However, Belmondo, who preferred making adventure films, disliked the picture. In a 1964 interview, he said:

It was very boring. Like Antonioni's films, Marguerite Duras' script was full of sous-entendus (hidden meanings). Everyone was looking something significant in every expression. You didn't just drink a glass of wine. You asked yourself, 'Why does she want me to drink it?'

The film was released in the U.S. as Seven Days... Seven Nights in 1964. The Los Angeles Times called it "perfection."

=== Awards ===
The film was nominated for the Palme d'Or at the 1960 Cannes Film Festival. Jeanne Moreau won the award for Best Actress. The critic from the New York Times who attended the festival called the film "dull and empty."
