= Robert Antelme =

French writer

Robert Antelme (5 January 1917 – 26 October 1990) was a French writer and editor. During the Second World War, he was involved in the French Resistance and deported.

== Biography ==
Antelme was born in Sartène, Corse-du-Sud. He studied law in Paris in 1936, then served in the military in 1937–1939, followed by active duty. He married Marguerite Duras in 1939. Their child died at birth in 1942. In the same year, Duras met Dionys Mascolo, who became her lover, leading to a ménage à trois between the three. Under the Vichy government, Antelme worked as an editor in the Ministry of the Interior. He joined a resistance group headed by François Mitterrand in 1943.

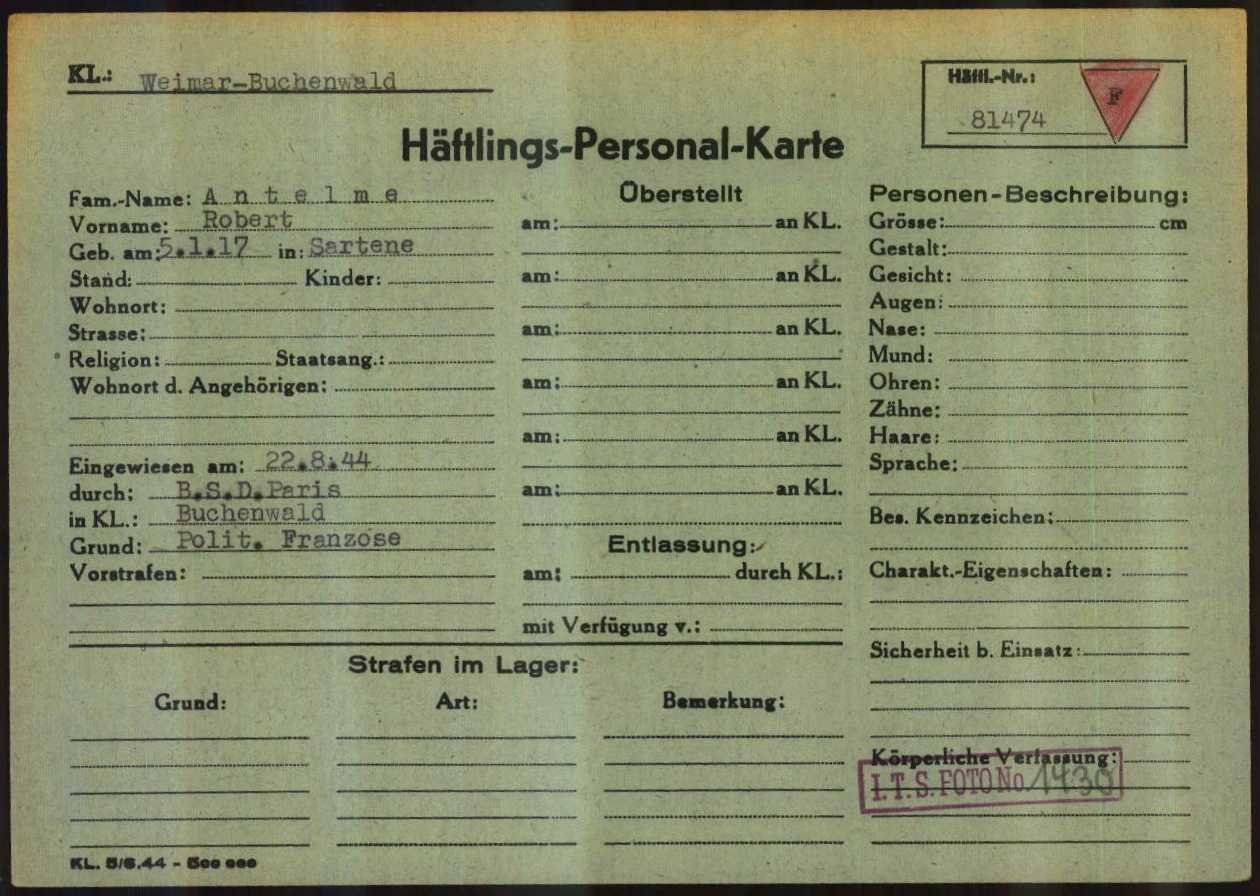
Registration card of Robert Antelme as a prisoner at Buchenwald Nazi Concentration Camp

Antelme was arrested on 1 June 1944 and deported to Buchenwald on 17 August 1944, then transferred to Gandersheim, before surviving a death march towards Dachau at the end of the war. Mitterrand found Antelme in a terrible state while visiting Dachau after the end of the war, and organised his return to Paris; Mitterrand later reported that he had almost not heard Antelme's soft-voiced call to him. Marguerite Duras looked after Antelme and wrote La Douleur about his return. She divorced him soon after he regained his health, but they remained friends.

After the war, Antelme worked for the Fédération nationale des déportés et internés résistants et patriotes. He was then employed as an editor at Gallimard from 1951 to 1981, working on the Encyclopédie de la Pléiade. He was a member of the French Communist Party, but left the party in 1953 upon learning of the existence of labor camps in the Soviet Union. In September 1960, he was one of the signatories of the Manifesto of the 121 in support of Algerian independence amid the Algerian War. He also participated in the protest movement of May 1968.

Paralyzed in 1983 by a stroke, he died on 26 October 1990 at the hospital of Hôtel des Invalides in Paris.

== Works ==
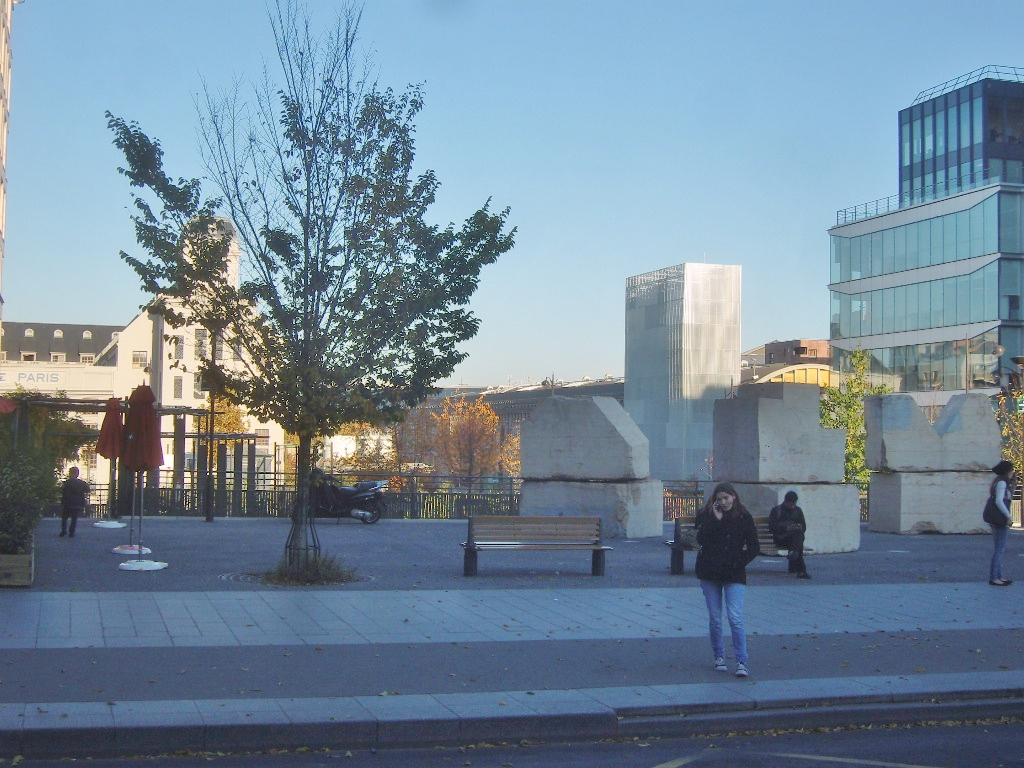
Street in Paris named after Antelme.

After the war, Antelme wrote L'Espèce humaine depicting his experiences in the camps. The book related his experience of detention in concentration camps. Published in 1947, the book was more than just a memoir of the hardships of a concentration camp, it was also a philosophical reflection on humanity. The account was originally published by Cité Universelle, a short-lived publishing house run by Antelme and Duras, in 1947; a revised second edition was published by Gallimard in 1957.

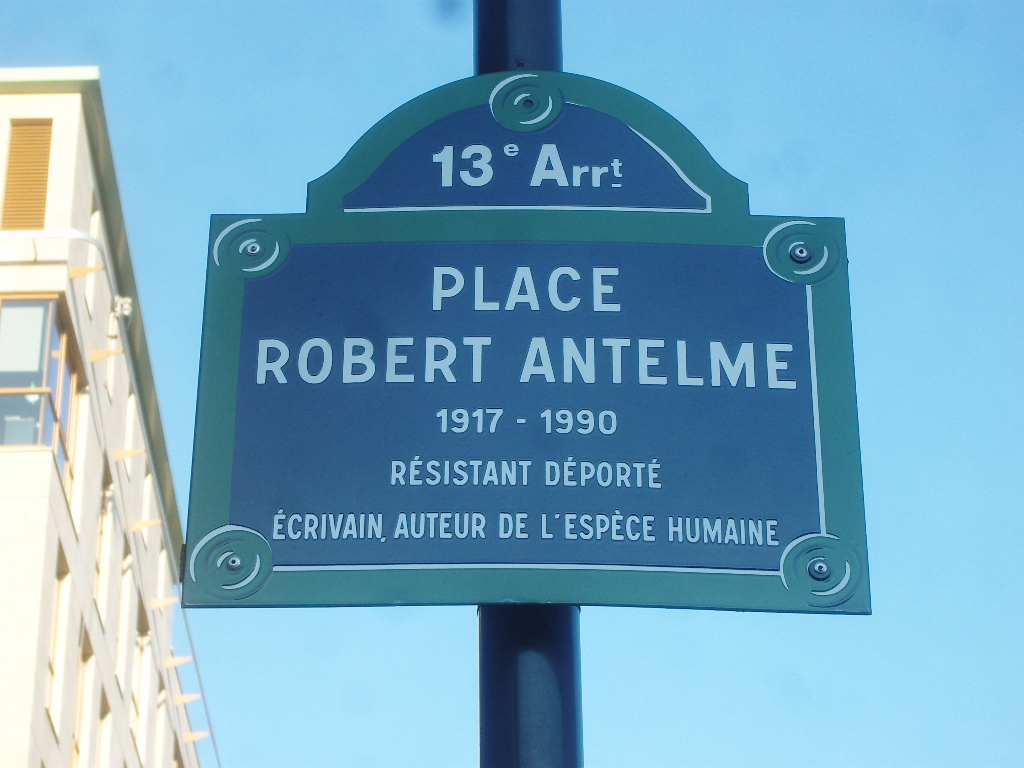
Sign board of street named after Antelme.

== Bibliography ==
- L'espèce humaine, Paris: Cité Universelle, 1947; Paris: Gallimard, 1957, 1999
- Textes inédits sur L'espèce humaine. Essais et témoignages, Paris: Gallimard, 1996
- Vengeance ?, Paris: Farrago, 2005; Paris: Hermann, 2010
