= Prix de Mai =

The Prix de Mai was a short-lived French literary award, founded by Alain Robbe-Grillet and first awarded to Moderato Cantabile by Marguerite Duras in 1958.

The jury included Georges Bataille, Maurice Blanchot, Roland Barthes, Marthe Robert, Dominique Aury.

Subsequent prizes went to such works as Le traître, (The traitor) by André Gorz, La Gana by Fred Deux (under pseudonym Jean Douassot), and Je by Yves Velan (1960), which did not meet with popular success, and the prize disappeared in short order.
