= Michael Lonsdale =

French-British actor (1931–2020)

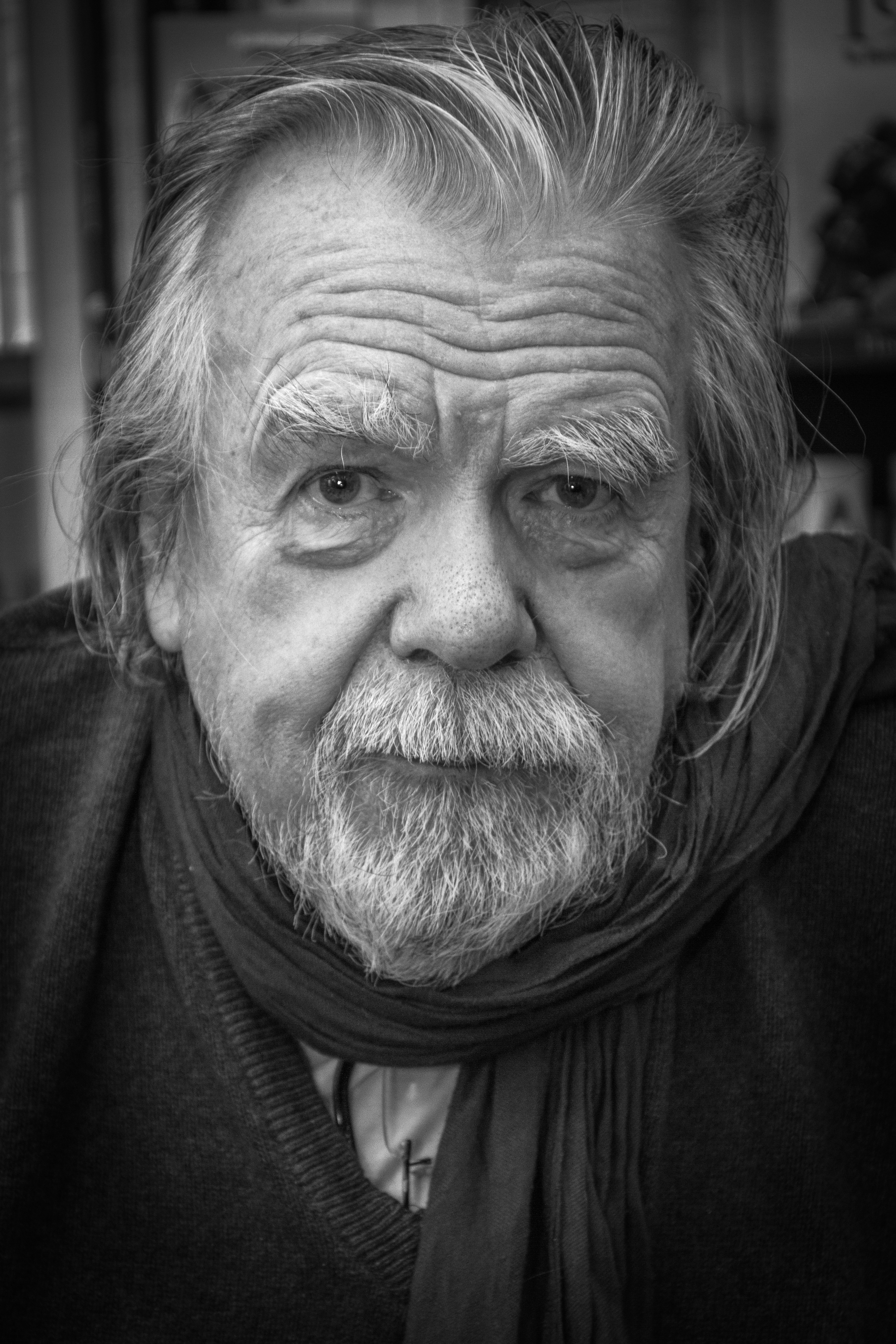
- Lonsdale in 2013
- Born: Michael Edward Lonsdale-Crouch; 24 May 1931; Paris, France
- Died: 21 September 2020 (aged 89); Paris, France
- Other name: Michel Lonsdale
- Occupation: Actor
- Years active: 1955–2016

Michael Edward Lonsdale Crouch (24 May 1931 – 21 September 2020), commonly known as Michael Lonsdale and sometimes as Michel Lonsdale, was a French-British actor and author who appeared in over 180 films and television shows. He is most famous for being cast as the villain Hugo Drax in the 1979 James Bond film Moonraker, deputy police commissioner Claude Lebel in The Day of the Jackal (1973), The Abbot in The Name of the Rose (1986) and Dupont d'Ivry in The Remains of the Day (1993).

== Early life and education ==
Lonsdale was born in Paris, the natural son of British Army officer Edward Lonsdale Crouch and Simone Calderon (née Béraud). He was brought up initially on the island of Jersey, then in London from 1935, and later, during the Second World War, in Casablanca, Morocco.

== Career ==
He returned to Paris to study painting in 1947, but was drawn into the world of acting instead, first appearing on stage at the age of 24. Lonsdale was bilingual, and appeared in both English-language and French-language productions. He appeared in a starring role with Roger Moore in the 1979 James Bond film Moonraker. and with Sean Connery, in the 1986 film The Name of the Rose. He would later appear in Munich (2005), a film that also starred another Bond actor, Daniel Craig.

In February 2011, he won a César Award for Best Supporting Actor for his work in Of Gods and Men.

Lonsdale was also the author of ten books.

== Personal life and death ==
As a practising Roman Catholic, he joined the Charismatic Renewal movement in the 1980s and was close to the Emmanuel Community.

In his 2016 memoir Le Dictionnaire de Ma Vie, Lonsdale revealed he had fallen for Delphine Seyrig, having met her as a student in Tania Balachova's acting classes at the Théâtre du Vieux-Colombier in 1947. He wrote that "it was her or nothing", which was why he never married.

Lonsdale died in Paris on 21 September 2020, aged 89.

== Filmography ==
=== Film ===
Year	Title	Role	Notes	Ref.
1956	It Happened in Aden	Sinclair		
1960	La main chaude	Nobert		
1960	Les portes claquent	Georges Hortegrenave		
1962	Adorable Liar	Albert		
1962	Le Crime ne paie pas	L'employé de la morgue	(segment "L'homme de l'avenue"), Uncredited	
1962	La dénonciation	Mercier		
1962	Snobs!	Charles Dufaut		
1962	The Trial	Priest		
1964	Behold a Pale Horse	Reporter		
1964	Jealous as a Tiger	L'automobiliste qui grimace		
1965	Les copains	Lamenbin		
1965	Je vous salue, mafia!	Hyman		
1966	Your Money or Your Life	Le conférencier au club des timides		
1966	Is Paris Burning?	Debu-Bridel	Uncredited	
1966	Judoka-Secret Agent	Thomas Perkins		
1966	Le fer à repasser			
1967	Les compagnons de la marguerite	Lastac / Lataque, expert en écritures / La voix du juge d'instruction		
1967	L'authentique procès de Carl-Emmanuel Jung	Un avocat		
1968	L'homme à la Buick	L'inspecteur / The inspector		
1968	The Bride Wore Black	René Morane		
1968	Stolen Kisses	Georges Tabard		
1968	La grande lessive!	Delaroche		
1969	Hibernatus	Professor Edouard Lauriebat		
1969	Détruire, dit-elle	Stein		
1969	L'hiver	Julien & Marc		
1970	L'étalon	Both		
1970	Le revolver et la rose	Philippe de la Tour / Dimitri Korkesky		
1971	Le printemps	L'homme qui fuit		
1971	Murmur of the Heart	Father Henri		
1971	Les Assassins de l'ordre	Commissioner Bertrand		
1971	Out 1	Thomas		
1971	Papa les petits bateaux...	Hippolyte		
1971	Jaune le soleil	Un juif		
1972	The Old Maid	Monod		
1972	Il était une fois un flic...	Le commissaire Lucas		
1972	Chut!	Sergel		
1972	L'automne	Julien, le réalisateur		
1972	Out 1: Spectre	Thomas		
1973	The Day of the Jackal	Deputy Commissioner Claude Lebel		
1973	La fille au violoncelle	Philippe Lariel		
1973	Les grands sentiments font les bons gueuletons	Stéphane		
1974	Successive Slidings of Pleasure	The Judge		
1974	La grande Paulette	Paul		
1974	Stavisky	Docteur Mézy	By Alain Resnais	
1974	La vérité sur l'imaginaire passion d'un inconnu	Le reporter TV / Ponce Pilate		
1974	Une baleine qui avait mal aux dents	Le peintre		
1974	Caravan to Vaccarès	Duc de Croyter		
1974	The Phantom of Liberty	Le chapelier / Hatter		
1974	Un linceul n'a pas de poches	Raymond		
1974	The Suspects	Le juge Souftries		
1975	Serious as Pleasure	L'inspecteur Fournier / Inspector Fournier		
1975	Galileo	Cardinal Barberini, later Pope Urban VIII		
1975	Aloïse	The second doctor		
1975	Special Section	Le ministre de l'intérieur Pierre Pucheu		
1975	La traque	David Sutter		
1975	The Romantic Englishwoman	Swan		
1975	India Song	Le vice-consul de Lahore		
1975	Folle à tuer	Stéphane Mostri		
1975	The Pink Telephone	Morrison		
1975	Ne			
1976	Scrambled Eggs	Le Président de la République		
1976	Mr. Klein	Pierre		
1976	Her Venetian Name in Deserted Calcutta	Récitant	Voice	
1976	Bartleby	L'huissier		
1976	L'Eden Palace	Raoul		
1977	Le diable dans la boîte	Georges Aubert		
1977	L'adieu nu	Boris / The visitor		
1977	The Accuser	Abéraud		
1977	The Left-Handed Woman	Kellner		
1977	Aurais dû faire gaffe... le choc est terrible			
1977	Une sale histoire		Documentary	
1977	Jacques Prévert	Himself		
1979	The Passage	Alain Renoudot		
1979	Moonraker	Hugo Drax		
1979	Ève avait l'éclat métallique de l'été			
1980	Seuls	Le peintre		
1980	Ella, une vraie famille	Le comédien studio d'enregistrement		
1981	The Bunker	Martin Bormann	TV movie	
1981	Chariots of Fire	Garth Jones		
1981	The Games of Countess Dolingen	Bertrand Haines-Pearson		
1981	Seuls	Ludovic		
1982	Le rose et le blanc	Léon		
1982	Sweet Inquest on Violence	Ash, le financier		
1982	Chronopolis	Narrator	Voice	
1982	Mora		As writer	
1982	Enigma	Bodley		
1983	Eréndira	Senator Onésimo Sanchez		
1983	Une jeunesse	Bejardy		
1984	The Judge	Le Docteur		
1984	Good King Dagobert	Saint Eloi		
1984	Les Boulugres	Le Roi	Voice	
1985	The Holcroft Covenant	Ernst Manfredi		
1985	The Insomniac on the Bridge	Antoine		
1985	Billy Ze Kick	Commissaire Bellanger		
1986	Canevas la ville		Voice	
1986	The Name of the Rose	The Abbot		
1987	The Madonna Man	Tanzmann		
1987	L'enfant et le président	Le président		
1988	The Tribulations of Balthazar Kober	Le maître		
1989	Souvenir	Xavier Lorion		
1989	L'homme de terre	Narrator	Voice	
1989	Cela s'appelle l'amour	Himself		
1991	My Life Is Hell	Gabriel	By Josiane Balasko	
1993	Woyzeck	Le capitaine		
1993	L'ordre du jour	Stark		
1993	The Remains of the Day	Dupont D'Ivry		
1995	Jefferson in Paris	Louis XVI		
1995	Nelly and Mr. Arnaud	Dolabella		
1996	The Human Plant	Michel		
1997	Mauvais genre	Honoré de Balzac		
1998	Don Juan	Don Luis		
1998	Let There Be Light	Monseigneur Loublié	By Arthur Joffé	
1998	Ronin	Jean-Pierre		
1999	A Monkey's Tale	Master Martin	Voice	
2000	Actors	Man in the street	By Bertrand Blier	
2000	Ceux d'en face	Mikaël		
2003	The Mystery of the Yellow Room	Stangerson		
2003	Kaena: The Prophecy	Opaz	Voice, French version	
2003	Adieu	Serge		
2003	Le Furet	Don Salvadore		
2004	L'empreinte	Romain Dessouches		
2004	Strange Crime	David		
2004	5x2	Bernard	By François Ozon	
2005	Les invisibles	Le gardien		
2005	Bye Bye Blackbird	Robert		
2005	The Perfume of the Lady in Black	Le professeur Stangerson		
2005	Good Girl	Jean		
2005	Selon Rachel			
2005	Munich	Papa		
2006	Il sera une fois...	Le vieux monsieur		
2006	Goya's Ghosts	Father Gregorio		
2007	Heartbeat Detector	Mathias Jüst		
2007	To Each His Own Cinema	The old blind man	(segment "Le Don")	
2007	The Last Mistress	Le vicomte de Prony		
2007	Go West! A Lucky Luke Adventure	Bartleby	Voice	
2009	Agora	Theon		
2009	Je vais te manquer	Max		
2009	Park Benches	The Client doormat		
2010	Of Gods and Men	Luc	César Award for Best Supporting Actor; Globes de Cristal Award for Best Actor	
2010	Hitler à Hollywood	Himself		
2011	Titeuf	Le psy	Voice	
2011	Free Men	Le recteur Si Kaddour Ben Ghabrit		
2011	The Cardboard Village	Il vecchio prete		
2012	Gebo and the Shadow	Gebo	By Manoel de Oliveira	
2013	Le renard jaune	Jean Virno		
2014	Rosenn		Voice	
2014	Maestro	Cédric Rovère		
2015	Les filles au Moyen Âge	Daniel		
2016	The First, the Last	Jean-Berchmans		
2016	Sculpt		(final film role)	

=== Television ===
Year	Title	Role	Notes	Ref(s)
1982	Smiley's People	Anton Grigoriev	TV miniseries	
1986	Le Tiroir secret		TV miniseries	
1991	Maigret ("Maigret et la Grande Perche")	Monsieur Serre	TV series	
2001	Maigret ("Maigret et la Croqueuse de Diamants")	Sir Lampson	TV series	
2013	Marguerite Yourcenar, alchimie du paysage	The Narrator	TV documentary	
2013	Le tourbillon de Jeanne	L'homme	TV series	

=== Video games ===
Year	Title	Role	Notes	Ref(s)
2008	Destroy All Humans! Path of the Furon	Henri Crousteau	Voice-over	
2012	007 Legends	Hugo Drax	Voice-over	
