= André Frénaud =

French poet

André Frénaud (French pronunciation: [ɑ̃dʁe fʁeno]; July 26, 1907, Montceau-les-Mines, France – June 21, 1993, Paris, France) was one of the most significant French poets of the generation that succeeded the Surrealist movement in the second half of the 20th century.

== Biography ==
After secondary school in Dijon, he continued his studies in Philosophy and Law in Paris. In 1930, he was a lecturer in French at the University of Lwów (in Poland at the time), and traveled in Russia, Spain and Italy. In 1937, he joined a public service, which he did not leave until 1967.

Mobilized in 1939, he was taken prisoner and spent two years in captivity in Brandenburg, before being released and sent back to France on false papers. Having started writing in 1938, his poems appeared, under the pseudonym "Benjamin Phelisse", in the clandestine publications of the Resistance directed by Paul Éluard, notably L'Honneur des poètes, and he was an active contributor to Jean Lescure's magazine Messages.

His collections have subsequently been published regularly by Gallimard, along with interviews with Bernard Pingaud on his poetry and poetic creation in general.

He was one of the signatories of the Manifesto of 121 on the right of insubordination during the Algerian war, published on September 6, 1960. As a civil servant, he was punished by the state with several months' suspension.

In 1973, he was awarded the Grand Prix de Poésie by the Académie Française, in 1985 the Grand Prix National de Poésie and, in 1989, the Grand prix de poésie de la SGDL (Société des gens de lettres).

Frénaud forged lasting friendships with painters Raoul Ubac and Jean Bazaine, whose exhibitions he accompanied with his prefaces. His poems are also illustrated by many other artists. He has collaborated fruitfully with publisher, poet and artist Pierre-André Benoit (PAB) in Alès.

After marrying Christiane Bailly in the 1950s, André Frénaud married Monique Mathieu, on June 8, 1971. In recent years, Mathieu had developed an important and personal body of work, supported by leading bibliophiles. The couple acquired and restored an old house in Bussy-le-Grand, Côte-d'Or, and set up a workshop where Monique Mathieu bound many of her husband's works, as well as those of their literary and painter friends.

He died on June 21, 1993, in the 7th arrondissement of Paris.

== Donation to the Musée Rolin ==
In 1999, Monique Mathieu donated ninety-five works (twenty paintings, fifty-eight drawings and collaged papers, fourteen engravings and three sculptures) to the town of Autun (Saône-et-Loire).

After two temporary exhibitions of the donation in 2000 and 2004 at the Musée Rolin, the 90 m2 permanent exhibition room was inaugurated in October 2008, in the newly converted attic of the Hôtel Lacomme.

Notably displayed are L'Homme à la pochette (1945) by Dubuffet, Hommage à Jean Fouquet (1952) by Estève, Corps étendu (1949) and Nature morte jaune (1950) by Ubac, L'Oiseleur by Jacques Villon (1931), the sculpture Oiseau et oiseaux (1950) by André Beaudin, and portraits of André Frénaud by Ubac (1948) and André Beaudin (1954).

== Bibliography ==
- Les Rois mages, Villeneuve-les-Avignon, Seghers, 1943.
- Poèmes de dessous le plancher suivi de La Noce noire, Gallimard, 1949.
- Il n'y a pas de paradis, Gallimard, 1962.
- L'Étape dans la clairière, Gallimard, 1966.
- Les Rois mages, corrected edition, Seghers, 1966; definitive edition, Gallimard, 1977.
- La Sainte face, Gallimard, 1968.
- Depuis toujours déjà, Gallimard, 1970.
- Notre inhabileté fatale (interviews), Gallimard, 1972.
- La Sorcière de Rome, Gallimard, 1973.
- Hæres, Gallimard, 1982.
- Nul ne s'égare, Gallimard, 1986 (ISBN 2070707407).
- Glose à la sorcière, Gallimard, 1995.
- André Frénaud: Nie ma raju. Wybór wierszy/Il n'y a pas de paradis. Choix de poèmes Wybrał, z francuskiego przełożył i opracował Ryszard Mierzejewski, 2024

== Notes and references ==
- Jean Lescure, André Frénaud ou la poésie à hauteur d'homme, in Poésie 45, nos 22 et 23, Paris, Seghers, February and March 1945.
- Georges-Emmanuel Clancier, André Frénaud, Paris, collection Poètes d'aujourd'hui, Seghers, 1953 (reissued in 1963).
- André Frénaud, texts by Raoul Ubac, Yves Bonnefoy, François Chapon, Pierre Lecuire, Jacques Réda, Bernard Pingaud, poems by André Frénaud, and bibliography), Maison de la Culture d'Amiens and Centre national d'art et de culture Georges-Pompidou, Paris, 1977.
- André Frénaud, [numerous texts and testimonials, notably from Paul Éluard, Jean Follain, Raymond Queneau, Jean Tardieu, Jean Lescure, Jean Bazaine, Yves Bonnefoy, Georges-Emmanuel Clancier, Pierre Seghers], Marseille, Sud no 39–40, 1981 (ISBN 2864460122).
- André Frénaud et Jean Tardieu, Marseille, Sud, 1983.
- Lire Frénaud, Éditions P. U. L., 1984.
- Pour André Frénaud, Obsidiane-Le Temps qu'il fait, collective, under the direction of François Boddaert (1993).
- Frénaud PAB Ubac 1948–1981, Alès, Musée Bibliothèque Pierre-André Benoit, 1995.
- André Frénaud Dix ans après in La Polygraphe 30-31 (1993) Texts by P. L. Rossi, J.-B. de Seynes, B. Grégoire, P. Boulage, Baptiste-Marrey, J.-Y. Debreuille...
- Pascal Commère, La grand'soif d'André Frénaud (Le Temps qu'il fait, 2001), D'un pays pâle et sombre (Le Temps qu'il fait, 2004).
- J.-Y Debreuille, La voix et le geste, André Frénaud et ses peintres, La Baconnière, 2005.
