= Pierre de Massot =

French poet

Pierre de Massot (April 10 1900, Lyon – 3 January 1969, Paris) was a French writer associated with the Dada and surrealist movements.

== Biography ==
He was born as the sixth child of the Count and Countess of Massot de Lafond.

Massot attended the Lycée Saint-Marc of the Jesuit Order in his hometown. He then went to Paris to study there. There he made the acquaintance of Francis Picabia, through whose support he soon met the publisher Pierre Seghers. He later had a close relationship with André Gide whom he considered to be a father figure. He was also friends with many other representatives of the French avant-garde such as Jean Cocteau, Marcel Duchamp, René Crevel, Max Jacob, Tristan Tzara and many others.

On July 6, 1923, Tzara had invited a group of Dadaists to the soirée “Cœur à Barbe” in the Théâtre Michel. A group around André Breton violently disrupted this event, in which Massot's arm was broken by a blow from Breton's cane and the police had to intervene. This marked the break between Dadaists and Surrealists. Nevertheless, two years later, Massot was one of the signatories of Breton's La révolution d'abord manifesto and became close to the Surrealists.

Massot joined the French Communist Party and was a supporter of Léon Blum's Popular Front. During the German occupation and Vichy France, he played a key role in the protecting of the French-Jewish writer André Suarès by telling the authorities he was his father.

After the liberation of France he wrote for the Nouvelle Revue Française. Massot left the Communist Party after the events of the 1956 Hungarian Revolution. He was an opponent of the French doctrine towards Algeria and was a signatory of the Manifesto of the 121.

The last years of his life were in obscurity and poverty. Massot fell in to depression after the death of his longtime friend Breton. He died on 3 January, 1969.

== Notable works ==
- De Mallarmé à 391, 1922
- Essai de critique théâtrale, with a portrait of the author by Pablo Picasso, 1922
- The Wonderful Book. Reflections on Rrose Selavy, with jokes from Marcel Duchamp, Paris-Passy, imprimerie Ravilly, 1924.
- Saint-Just ou le divin bourreau, 1925
- Portrait d'un bull-dog, with photographs by Berenice Abbott, 1926
- Soliloque de Nausicaa, with paintings by Jean Cocteau, 1928
- Prolégomènes à une éthique sans métaphysique, with a drawing by Kristians Tonny, 1930
- Mon corps, ce doux-démon, (with a portrait of the author by Jacques Villon and a preface letter by André Gide), 1959
- Oui, notules sur Erik Satie et lettres du compositeur à l'auteur, with a drawing by Georges Braque, 1960
- Le Mystère des maux, 1961
- Marcel Duchamp, 1965
- Francis Picabia, 1966
- D-S, 1967
- André Breton ou le Septembriseur, 1967
- Le Déserteur. Œuvre poétique 1923-1969, texts collected and presented by Gérard Pfister, with portraits of the author by Pablo Picasso, Francis Picabia, Max Ernst, Georges Malkine, Éditions Arfuyen, 1992
