= The Lorry =

1977 film

- Directed by: Marguerite Duras
- Written by: Marguerite Duras
- Produced by: François Barat; Pierre Barat
- Starring: Marguerite Duras; Gérard Depardieu
- Cinematography: Bruno Nuytten
- Edited by: Dominique Auvray
- Distributed by: Films Molière
- Release date: 25 May 1977
- Running time: 76 minutes
- Country: France
- Language: French

The Lorry (French: Le camion) or The Truck is a 1977 French experimental film directed by Marguerite Duras, starring herself and Gérard Depardieu. The film is known for its rejection of conventional narrative, as it tells a story that will never be seen on screen: it consists entirely of a conversation between a director (Duras) and a potential actor for a film she is preparing (Depardieu), with the former recounting her screenplay to the latter. The film premiered at the 1977 Cannes Film Festival, where it was met with a notoriously hostile audience reaction.

== Plot ==
In a closed room, a female director meets with an actor and describes a film project to him. The film would center on the encounter between a woman and a truck driver who picks her up while she is hitchhiking. The woman would talk a lot, without the truck driver paying much attention. As the director recounts the story, the actor occasionally reacts and offers input. Their conversation is interspersed with shots of a truck driving along a road.

== Reaction ==
Le camion was entered into the 1977 Cannes Film Festival.

After the Cannes debut, the crowd reacted "at first with highly vocal disbelief and the with outbursts of anger, and walk-outs" and even those "charmed by her harmonious, lulling use of the film medium ... have, buried under a few layers, the rebellious instincts that others [gave] loud voice to."

Following the showing, Duras stood atop a flight of stairs while a crowd yelled insults at her. Critic of the time, Pauline Kael wrote that she believed that Duras enjoyed antagonizing the crowd.

It later opened at The New York Film Festival.

In an interview with Marguerite Duras, Jean-Luc Godard praised the film for the way that it "lets the text come through but also carries it."

== Cast ==
- Marguerite Duras as Her
- Gérard Depardieu as Him

== Reception ==
Pauline Kael for The New Yorker wrote that in La Camion Duras "has become a master" and that the film is a split between "her artistry and what the public wants...pointed up and turned against the audience." She praises the film as the "opposite extreme from popcorn filmmaking, it's the demonstration of creative force."

== Home media ==
The film was reissued on DVD and Blu-ray, and released on streaming.
