= The Ravishing of Lol Stein =

Novel by Marguerite Duras

- First US edition
- Author: Marguerite Duras
- Translator: Grove Press
- Language: Français
- Genre: Roman
- Publisher: Gallimard; Grove Press (US); Hamish Hamilton (UK)
- Publication date: 1964
- Publication place: France
- English publication date: 1966

Le ravissement de Lol V. Stein is a novel written by Marguerite Duras and published in France by Gallimard in 1964. The text was translated by Richard Seaver and published as The Ravishing of Lol Stein in the U.S. by Grove Press in 1966. The text was also translated by Eileen Ellenbogen in the UK as The rapture of Lol V. Stein for Hamish Hamilton in 1967.

== Plot ==
At the beginning of the novel, Lola (Lol) Stein (her middle initial is omitted in the English translation) is a woman in her thirties. She was born and raised in South Tahla in a bourgeois family and is engaged to Michael Richardson at 19. However, at a ball in the seaside resort of Town Beach, Michael Richardson leaves Lol for Anne-Marie Stretter, an older woman. After a difficult recovery from this shock which marks her for the rest of her life, Lol marries John Bedford, a musician she meets on one of her daily walks. Lol moves away to Uxbridge with her husband.

Ten years later, with three children, Lol is an established woman. She returns with her family to South Tahla and moves into the house she grew up in. Lol goes on her daily walks as she did ten years before. She thinks she recognises Tatiana Karl one day, the friend who consoled her after her breakup with Michael Richardson. The man who accompanies Tatiana makes a deep impression on Lol.

Lol reestablishes contact with Tatiana and gets to know both her husband and her lover, Jack Hold. Lol is able to get information from Jack about events at the ball at Town Beach 10 years before. Lol reveals to Jack her interest in him but forbids him to stay with her instead of Tatiana.

Lol spies on Tatiana and her lover but Jack notices her. One day Lol tells Jack that she has been to Town Beach alone and plans to return with him.

When they travel there together, Lol shows Jack the room where she and Michael Richardson had split up. Lol and Jack spend the night together. The next day, Jack has one last meeting with Tatiana Karl.

The novel is seen through the obsessive eyes of Jack Hold.

== See also ==
- Le Monde's 100 Books of the Century
