= Dionys Mascolo =

French editor, writer, and activist

Dionys Mascolo (11 February 1916 – 20 August 1997) was a French literary editor, resistance fighter, left-wing political activist, author, and former husband of Marguerite Duras.

== Life and work ==
Born into a family of Italian immigrants, Mascolo worked at several small jobs when he found himself in charge of a family after his father's death. Shortly before the German occupation of France, Gaston Gallimard hired him as a publisher's reader for his publishing house Éditions Gallimard. There he met, among others, Marguerite Duras and her later husband Robert Antelme.

With them, Mascolo then founded in 1944 the groupe de la rue Saint-Benoît. He joined the Résistance under François Mitterrand using the nom du guerre Lieutenant Masse.

After the liberation of France, Mascolo returned to Paris with Edgar Morin, among others. The following year, Mascolo joined the French Communist Party (PCF), but was expelled again in 1949 for his "behavior detrimental to the party".

Shortly after Marguerite Duras divorced Robert Antelme in 1947, she married Mascolo in Paris. The two had a son, Jean, in 1947 and separated again as early as 1956.

When French President René Coty nominated Charles de Gaulle as prime minister in 1958, Mascolo founded together with Jean Schuster the journal Le 14 juillet; as a mouthpiece of a strengthening Anti-Gaullism. A vehement opponent of French colonial policy, especially the Algerian War, Mascolo was among the signatories of the Manifesto of the 121 in September 1960.

== Reception ==
As a writer, Mascolo was very much concerned with Friedrich Nietzsche and Louis Antoine de Saint-Just; he was also interested in the role of intellectuals, for example, in communism.

== Works ==
- Le communisme. Révolution et communication ou la dialectique des valeurs et des besoins. Gallimard, Paris 1953.
- Lettere polonaise. Sur la misère intellectuelle en France. Éditions de Minuit, Paris 1957.
- Autour d'un effort de mémoire. Sur un lettre de Robert Anthelme. Édition Nadeau, Paris 1987.
- De l'amour. Éditions Benoît Jacab, Paris 1999, ISBN 2-913645-02-X.
- Haine de la philosophie. Heidegger pour modèle. Jean-Michel Place, Paris 1993, ISBN 2-85893-190-9.
- With Jean-Paul Sartre and Bernard Pingaud: Du rôle de l'intellectuel dans le mouvement révolutionnaire. Losfeld, Paris 1971.
- A la recherche d'un communisme de pensée. Entêtements. Éditions Fourbis, Paris 1993, ISBN 2-907374-63-X.
- sur le sens et l'usage du mot "gauche". Suivi de contre les idéologies de la mauvaise conscience. Nouvelles Éditions Lignes, Fécamps 2011, ISBN 978-2-35526-083-4.
