= The Sea Wall (film) =

- Directed by: Rithy Panh
- Written by: Marguerite Duras (novel); Rithy Panh; Michel Fessler
- Produced by: Cati Couteau; Catherine Dussart
- Cinematography: Pierre Milon
- Edited by: Marie-Christine Rougerie
- Music by: Marc Marder
- Distributed by: Axiom Films (UK and Ireland)
- Release dates: September 9, 2008 (Canada); January 7, 2009 (France)
- Countries: France; Cambodia; Belgium
- Language: French
- Budget: $7.1 million
- Box office: $1.6 million

The Sea Wall (French: Un barrage contre le Pacifique) is a 2008 film by Cambodian director Rithy Panh in a French/Cambodian/Belgian co-production. The film opened on 7 January 2009 in France. It was adapted from the 1950 novel The Sea Wall by Marguerite Duras. The novel had previously been adapted as This Angry Age by René Clément in 1958.

== Cast ==
- Isabelle Huppert as Mother
- Gaspard Ulliel as Joseph
- Àstrid Bergès-Frisbey as Suzanne
- Stéphane Rideau as Agosti
- Randal Douc as Monsieur Jo
- Duong Vanthon as Corporal
- Lucy Harrison as Carmen
- Vincent Grass as Father Bart

== See also ==
- Isabelle Huppert on screen and stage
