= India Song =

1975 film by Marguerite Duras

- Theatrical release poster
- Directed by: Marguerite Duras
- Written by: Marguerite Duras
- Produced by: Stephane Tchalgadileff
- Starring: Delphine Seyrig; Michael Lonsdale; Mathieu Carrière; Claude Mann; Vernon Dobtcheff; Didier Flamand; Claude Juan
- Cinematography: Bruno Nuytten
- Edited by: Solange Leprince
- Music by: Carlos d'Alessio
- Production companies: Sunchild Productions; Les Films Armorial
- Distributed by: Les Films Armorial
- Release dates: May 1975 (Cannes); 4 June 1975 (France)
- Running time: 120 minutes
- Country: France
- Language: French
- Budget: ₣254,542

India Song is a 1975 French drama film written and directed by Marguerite Duras. Starring Delphine Seyrig, Michael Lonsdale, Mathieu Carrière, Claude Mann, Vernon Dobtcheff, Didier Flamand, and Claude Juan. Set in 1930s Calcutta during the monsoon season, the story revolves around Anne-Marie Stretter (Seyrig), the enigmatic and disillusioned wife of the French ambassador to India. Though the narrative is set in India, the film was primarily shot on location at the Château Rothschild in France.

India Song was selected as the French entry for Best Foreign Language Film at the 48th Academy Awards but did not receive a nomination. A sequel, Her Venetian Name in Deserted Calcutta, was released in 1976.

== Plot ==
Set in Calcutta in 1937 during the monsoon season, the story unfolds in a time when leprosy is rampant across the country. Anne-Marie Stretter, the wife of the French ambassador to India, has been married to Ambassador Stretter for seventeen years. Born to a French father and a Venetian mother, Anne-Marie grew up in Venice as Ana-Maria Guardi, where she developed into a promising musician. However, her musical ambitions were abandoned after her first marriage at eighteen, when she moved to Savannakhet, Laos, with her husband, a colonial official. Unable to endure life there, she eventually left him after meeting Ambassador Stretter during his inspection of Mekong posts. Following her second marriage, she spent seventeen years in various Asian capitals before settling in Calcutta.

Anne-Marie is now involved in an affair with Michael Richardson, a businessman, which her husband tolerates. Life in Calcutta is marked by monotony and stifling heat, exacerbated by the relentless monsoon. The French embassy hosts a reception attended by the newly arrived Austrian ambassador and the Vice-Consul of Lahore, who has been transferred to Calcutta as punishment for shooting leprosy patients and attempting suicide in Lahore. The Vice-Consul, described as having never been with a woman, becomes infatuated with Anne-Marie. During the reception, he dances with her and pleads to stay overnight, but she rejects him. After a dramatic outburst in which he declares his love, he is forcibly removed from the embassy.

The following day, Anne-Marie, Michael Richardson, the Austrian ambassador, Georges Crawn (a close friend of Anne-Marie), and a young embassy guest travel to the delta islands, where the ambassador’s villa is located. The Vice-Consul follows them separately and joins the group at the "Prince of Wales" hotel for dinner. Anne-Marie and Michael, disillusioned with their idle lives, had previously attempted suicide together and made a pact not to interfere if either chose to end their life. That evening, the group leaves Anne-Marie alone. She spends the night on a park bench, and her evening coat is later found on the beach.

The story concludes with the Vice-Consul resigning shortly after these events. Michael Richardson returns to England following Anne-Marie’s death and dies there as well.

== Cast ==
- Delphine Seyrig - Anne-Marie Stretter
- Michel Lonsdale - Vice-consul of Lahore
- Mathieu Carrière - German embassy attaché
- Claude Mann - Michael Richardson
- Vernon Dobtcheff - Georges Crawn
- Didier Flamand - The young guest
- Claude Juan - The servant

== Production ==
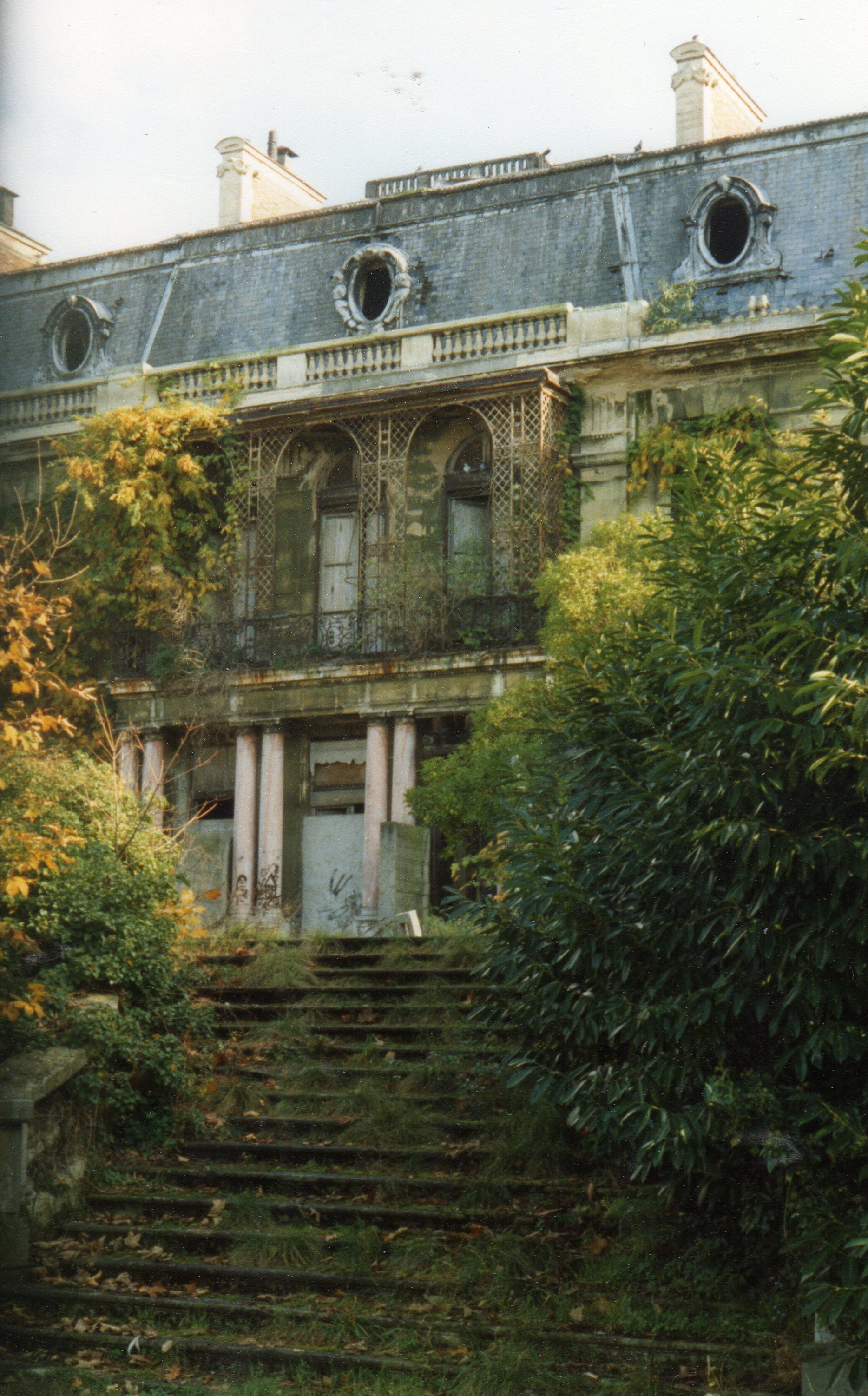
The film was shot at the Château Rothschild outside of Paris.

The script for India Song was based on an unproduced play which Marguerite Duras finished in July 1972. The play had been commissioned for the Royal National Theatre by Peter Hall. Duras had only visited India briefly in her teens, but chose to not consult any photographs from Calcutta while she worked on India Song, preferring to imagine it all.

The film cost 254,542 francs to produce, of which 250,000 came from the CNC. Dominique Sanda was the first choice for the leading role, but dropped out and was replaced by Seyrig. Finding the main location took several months; eventually Duras chose the Château Rothschild in Boulogne, which she had seen during a walk and which had impressed her. The Rothschild family had abandoned the building after World War II and it had started to dilapidate. Other scenes were shot at the Grand Trianon in Versailles, and in two Paris apartments which were about to be demolished. Filming began on 13 May 1974 and lasted two months. The voices were pre-recorded.

== Release ==
India Song was shown as part of the 1975 New York Film Festival, and, out of competition, at the 1975 Cannes Film Festival. It was released in France on 4 June 1975.

== Reception ==
=== Critical response ===
On the review aggregator website Rotten Tomatoes, India Song holds an approval rating of 83% based on 6 reviews, with an average rating of 6.5/10.

Vincent Canby, writing for The New York Times, gave the film a negative review, finding that it was aesthetically pleasing but shallow. Canby described India Song as "no content and all style", although he felt that Seyrig's portrayal of Anne-Marie was "marvelous to contemplate". Clarke Fountain, reviewing the film for AllMovie, rated it four out of five stars.

=== Accolades ===
India Song was nominated for three César Awards in 1976—Best Music Written for a Film for Carlos d'Alessio, Best Sound for Michel Vionnet, and Best Actress for Delphine Seyrig. However, the film did not win in any of the nominated categories. It was France's submission for Best Foreign Language Film at the 48th Academy Awards, but did not receive a nomination.

Today the film is seen more favourably by critics and it is included in the book 1001 Movies You Must See Before You Die, where Travis Crawford cites it as the director's best film, describing the film as "fascinating" in its use of language and sound in contrast to imagery, and calling it an "elliptical dream poem rather than linear narrative". However, he acknowledges that opinions are markedly divided on the film and that viewers will either find it "hypnotically seductive or maddeningly pretentious". Michael Lonsdale considered his part to be his "most favorite role", adding that "it helped me exorcise the suffering I was going through at the time in my personal life".

== See also ==
- 1975 in film
- Cinema of France
- List of French submissions for the Academy Award for Best Foreign Language Film
- List of submissions to the 48th Academy Awards for Best Foreign Language Film
