= Ylipe =

French cartoonist (1936–2003)

Philippe Labarthe, pseudonym Ylipe (9 January 1936 – 8 March 2003) was a French humorist, artist, and writer.

He was born in Bordeaux and studied Fine Arts there before moving to Paris to work as a cartoonist, painter and aphorist. He signed his cartoons φlipe, using the Greek letter phi (φ) in place of the first three letters of his forename. Maurice Nadeau misread the Greek φ as a Latin y and the name Ylipe stuck.

In the 1960s he contributed to Arts, L'Express, and Lettres nouvelles, and signed the Manifesto of the 121 opposing the use of torture during the Algerian War. He later exhibited paintings in New York and Paris under his own name, with backing from Eugène Ionesco and Jacques Prévert.

In 2000, a back injury prevented him painting and he returned to writing aphorisms. His writing and painting often exhibit black humour; Dominique Noguez described him as a "sparkling misanthrope" (French: misanthrope étincelant). He died of lung cancer, having refused medical treatment.

== Bibliography ==
Books

- Magloire de Paris (in French). Éric Losfeld. 1961.
- Aqua Toffana (in French). Jean-Jacques Pauvert. 1962.
- Leçons de chose (in French). privately printed. 1965.
- Textes sans paroles (in French). Le Dilettante. 2001. ISBN 2842630416.
- Le BCD du peintre moderne (in French). La Différence. 2002. ISBN 2729114289.
- Sexes sans paroles (in French). Le Dilettante. 2003. ISBN 2842630734.

Periodicals

- "spécial Ylipe : Écrivez plus grand, elle est sourde". Bizarre (in French) (45). Jean-Jacques Pauvert. 1967.
