= Her Venetian Name in Deserted Calcutta =

- Directed by: Marguerite Duras
- Screenplay by: Marguerite Duras
- Produced by: François Barat; Pierre Barat
- Starring: Michael Lonsdale; Delphine Seyrig; Nicole Hiss; Marie-Pierre Thiebaut; Sylvie Nuytten
- Cinematography: Bruno Nuytten
- Edited by: Geneviève Dufour
- Music by: Carlos d'Alessio
- Production companies: Cinéma 9; Les Productions Audiovisuelles
- Release date: 2 June 1976
- Running time: 114 minutes
- Country: France
- Language: French

Her Venetian Name in Deserted Calcutta (French: Son nom de Venise dans Calcutta désert) is a 1976 French drama film directed by Marguerite Duras and starring Michael Lonsdale, Delphine Seyrig, Nicole Hiss, Marie-Pierre Thiebaut and Sylvie Nuytten. The film uses the same soundtrack of her 1975 film India Song, but is set to different images alongside an additional ending. It depicts the life of Anne-Marie Stretter, wife of the French ambassador to India circa 1930, who is also a main character in India Song. The film premiered at the 1976 Cannes Film Festival in the Directors' Fortnight.

== Plot ==
The life of Anne-Marie Stretter, wife of the French ambassador of India in the 1930s. The soundtrack of Her Venetian Name in Deserted Calcutta is the same as that of India Song – only the images are changed.

== Cast ==
- Michael Lonsdale as Le vice-consul de Lahore
- Delphine Seyrig as Anne-Marie Stretter
- Nicole Hiss as Herself
- Marie-Pierre Thiebaut as Herself
- Sylvie Nuytten as Herself
