= Destroy, She Said =

Détruire, dit-elle
- Directed by: Marguerite Duras
- Written by: Marguerite Duras
- Produced by: Nicole Stéphane
- Starring: Catherine Sellers, Michael Lonsdale, Henri Garcin, Nicole Hiss, Daniel Gélin
- Cinematography: Jean Penzer
- Edited by: Henri Colpi
- Release date: December 1969
- Running time: 100 minutes
- Country: France
- Language: French

Détruire, dit-elle (English, Destroy, She Said) is a 1969 French drama film directed by Marguerite Duras based on her book of the same title.

== Cast ==
- Catherine Sellers - Elisabeth Alione
- Michael Lonsdale - Stein
- Henri Garcin - Max Thor
- Nicole Hiss - Alissa
- Daniel Gélin - Bernard Alione
