= La Ville dont le prince est un enfant (play) =

Play by Henry de Montherlant

La Ville dont le prince est un enfant is a play published in 1951–67 by the French dramatist Henry de Montherlant. The title ('"The City Whose Prince is a Child") is taken from Ecclesiastes 10:16: "Woe to thee, O land, when thy king is a child, and thy princes eat in the morning!"

== Evolution of the theatrical work ==
Henry de Montherlant was born on 20 April 1895, and the play was one of his first works, which he began writing under the title Serge Sandrier in 1912. He would go on developing the piece for four decades before eventually publishing it for the first time in 1951 and bringing out a definitive version in 1967. The play was inspired by events in Montherlant's adolescence, particularly his formative years at the Institution Notre-Dame de Sainte-Croix, commonly known as the Collège Sainte-Croix de Neuilly. It looks at the difficulties in the life of André Sevrais as a young man aged 15–16 in a Catholic school in France and his friendship and love for a younger boy aged 11–12.

In 1969, three years before Montherlant's death on 21 September 1972, an amended version would be republished under the title Les Garçons ("The Boys"), taking a fresh look on the story with André Sevrais becoming the character Alban de Bricoule, who had already served as a stand-in for the author in Montherlant's novels Le Songe and Les Bestiaires.

== Plot ==
Philosophy student André Sevrais attends a Catholic boys' school in Paris, where he establishes a firm friendship with a much younger schoolmate, the rebellious Serge Souplier. The friendship between the two youngsters does not go unobserved, however, by the Abbé de Pradts, a teacher-priest who harbors a secret obsession of his own with young Souplier and uses his position of authority to try to thwart the adolescent Servais, under the pretext of protecting the younger Souplier; ultimately, however, the abbé is undone by his own hand.

== Stage acts ==
- Montherlant presented the play for the first time in 1952 in Geneva (Switzerland) through an amateur group of actors, in order to test the public's reaction to the play.
- In 1963, the first act of the play was presented at Mathurins Theater, in Paris, as a curtain raiser for another of his works entitled Fils de personne.
- The play was presented in its entirety in 1967 at Michel Theater in Paris, with Paul Guers in the role of the Abbé de Pradts, and Didier Haudepin playing the role of André Sevrais.
- A full presentation of the Michel Theatre act was broadcast in 1969 on the first channel of the official French television network Radiodiffusion-Télévision Française (ORTF).
- In 1974, it was staged again at the Mathurins Theater.
- In April 1994 it played again at the Hébertot Theater. In this version, Christophe Malavoy played the role of the Abbé de Pradts. He also played the role in an adapted television version.
- In 2006, yet another version was played at the Théâtre du Nord-Ouest with a remarkable role of Sevrais by Maxime Dambrin (aka Raoust).
- In 2007, the part is assembled in Brussels, Belgium with the "Comédie Claude Volter" group.

== Publications ==
- 1951 - Paris by Gallimard
- 1952 - Paris by Plon
- 1967 - Paris by Gallimard (with reworked definitive text)
- La Pléiade - Volume II, with the outlines of the parts
- 1971 - as Le Livre de Poche (pocket book)
- 1973 - Folio (re-edited in 1994)

== French film adaptation ==
Christophe Malavoy directed in 1997 a film entitled La Ville dont le prince est un enfant, also known by its English language release title The Fire That Burns. In the movie version Malavoy played the role of the Abbé de Pradts and Naël Marandin the role of André Sevrais and Clément van den Bergh in the role of Serge Souplier. The film also featured Michel Aumont the role as superior of the school.

== English adaptations ==
The play was adapted for radio and first broadcast, in a translation by Henry Reed entitled The Land Where the King is a Child, by the BBC Third Programme on 10 March 1959.

A later translation, The Fire that Consumes by Vivian Cox, was staged at the Mermaid Theatre, London, in 1977, with Nigel Hawthorne in the role of the Abbé de Pradts.

== Issues ==
The play deals with the complex relations in a Catholic school. The abbé is torn between his human desires and his religious obligations of abstinence. He tells the superior of the college that God has created men more sensitive than fathers, as they see how these children who are not ours are not loved. He also tells André Sevrais who refuses this fate: "You will smile about this when you are twenty years old"; to which the boy answers: "Not me, I will never smile!". Indeed, Montherlant would be haunted throughout his life by this experience at a young age in 1912 at Collège Sainte-Croix de Neuilly in 1912.

However Montherlant would take huge precautions to approach the touchy taboo subject of friendship between children and adults, especially in a Catholic environment, genuinely fearing to write a text which would devalue the religion as he carefully explained in the long foreword to the play and the appendix published with it.
