= Moderato Cantabile =

1958 novel by Marguerite Duras

- First edition
- Author: Marguerite Duras
- Language: French
- Genre: Novel
- Publication date: 1958
- Publication place: France
- ISBN: 978-1-84749-052-0
- OCLC: 226976060

Moderato Cantabile is a novel by Marguerite Duras. It was very popular, selling half a million copies, and was the initial source of Duras' fame.

== Plot ==
The plot is initially the banal daily routine of a rich woman taking her son to piano lessons, and conversing with a working-class man in a café, drinking wine all the way, then reaches a scandal at a dinner party in chapter 7, followed by a dénouement in the final chapter.

The story concerns the life of a woman, Anne Desbaresdes, and her varying relationships with her child, the piano teacher Mademoiselle Giraud and Chauvin. Chauvin is a working-class man who is currently unemployed and whiles away his time in a café near the apartment where Anne Desbaresdes' child takes piano lessons with Madame Giraud. After the fatal shooting of a woman in the café by her lover, Anne and Chauvin imagine the relationship between the lovers and try to reason why it occurred. Anne frequently returns to the café, before returning to her comfortable home, the last house on the Boulevard de la Mer, which itself represents the social divide between the working- and middle-classes. In the climactic 7th chapter, she returns home late and drunk to a dinner party, then causes a scandal (and is subsequently ill, vomiting) whose consequences are seen in the 8th and final chapter.

== Organization ==
The novella is organized into 8 chapters, 5 of which recount the passage of full days. Chapters 5, 6, and 7 recount a detailed 6th day of the novella, moving first from a piano lesson to Anne's meeting with Chauvin, and finally to the reception which Anne is late for. Thus, the novel recounts the passage of a full week during Anne's life. The novelette is ambiguous at many points throughout. In some instances, the reader cannot tell who is talking because no caption is provided for speeches. With the exception of Chauvin, Anne and Mademoiselle Giraud, no other names are mentioned; Anne's husband is referred to as "on" in French. The setting is also vague as we are never given a definitive place to locate the town, other than the fact that it is close to the sea. The time can be inferred to be late spring to early summer, but we cannot tell the exact month. However, specific settings, like Anne's house and the café, are described in detail in the description and speeches of the conversations between Anne and Chauvin. Chapter 1 and 5 are set in Mademoiselle Giraud's apartment. The other chapters all start with Anne's arrival at the café, her daily conversation with Chauvin, and her inevitable return to her home due to the siren that signals the end of the working day. It is speculated that Anne returns home at the siren in order to return before her husband gets home.

== Characters ==
Anne Desbaresdes

The wife of a wealthy director of downtown factories, Anne belongs to the upper echelon of the town's social class. One day, while at her child's piano lesson, she sees and becomes intrigued by the murder of a woman by her possible lover. Subsequent chapters see Anne returning to the café where the murder was committed, often speculating upon details of the murder with Chauvin, a man who used to work in the factories her husband manages. Her venture into the café is considered a social faux-pas, as she comes into a shabby café where her husband's workers retire to daily; these workers recognize both Chauvin and Anne. While inventing details of the murder, Chauvin and Anne seem to have a metaphysical relationship reflected in their invented ideas; their relationship begins with talk about how the murdered couple's relationship began, and ends with Anne's acknowledgement that she is dead; reflective, again, of the murdered couple's relationship. Her life is characterized by repetition: many elements, such as her walk down the Boulevard of the Sea, the suppressed imagery of violence, the siren, seem to recur in succeeding chapters. One reading of the novelette interprets Anne's actions as an attempt to escape this repetition, ultimately culminating in the same repetition she was trying to avoid. She has an intense and profound attachment to her child, which may be interpreted as her inability to let go of maternal responsibilities.

Chauvin

Chauvin is a working class man who used to work at Anne's husband's factory. His name seems to be an allusion to "chauvinism," referring to his often dominating tone during conversations with Anne. However, in French, chauvin(e) is an adjective which translates as "patriotic." The name Chauvin has nothing to do with "misogynie," the French word for chauvinism. He remarks that he often has nothing to do. Throughout the novel, he has unusually detailed knowledge of Anne's house and habits. He knows her directly via the repetitious reception that Anne's husband gives for workers at his factory. He seems to have a (sexual) relationship with Anne that is achieved through words instead of physical contact.

The Child

The child, (l'enfant), is never given a name, like many of the characters in the novelette. He is a talented piano player, but has little enthusiasm for learning the technicality of piano-playing: he doesn't make an effort to learn the meaning of tempo, nor does he find practicing scales necessary. The piece he plays throughout the novelette is the Diabelli sonata, the tempo of which composes the title: Moderato Cantabile (moderately and singingly). He is stubborn, and refuses to yield to the orders of his teacher, Madame Giraud. Critics have pointed to this stubbornness as a reflection of Anne's refusal to give in to the repetition of her life; this may be the reason why Anne approves of the child's obstinate behaviour. However, « Quand il obéit de cette façon, ça me dégoûte un peu. » ("When he obeys in this way, it disgusts me somewhat"). The child is at once her « honte » (shame) and « trésor ». 'Il est un enfant difficile {...} non sans une certaine timidité'. ('He's a difficult child {..} and not without a certain shyness').

Mademoiselle Giraud

Mademoiselle Giraud is the piano teacher of Anne's child. She disapproves of Anne's upbringing of the child, and is a stereotype of the strict teacher of the 20th century: at one point in the novelette she is portrayed with a ruler.

Mr. Desbaresdes

Throughout the novelette Anne's husband is never really mentioned by reference or name, instead given the impersonal "on" in the French novel. Translated, this means "one" (i.e. One is, one has etc.) This suggests that he is never a real physical presence in Anne's life, although his presence looms over her. He is a wealthy factory-owner in the small town. The Desbaresdes' house is situated towards the end of a long Boulevard of the Sea, suggesting that it is the richest in town.

The Boss

La patronne or the boss owns the café where the murder first occurs. She is a bystander of the metaphysical affair between Anne and Chauvin, and serves them wine from time to time. She usually serves clients who come from the factory at 6:00 pm from work. When she is not conversing with them, she is knitting a red sweater. This colour sustains the motif of the colour red throughout the novelette. Towards the latter stages of the relationship between Anne and Chauvin, she disapproves of their relationship, but says nothing.

== Relationships ==
=== Child and mother ===
Perhaps the most persistent and complex relationship throughout the novel revolves not around Chauvin and Anne, but around Anne and her child. The title is based on the tempo of a Diabelli sonatina, a child's piano piece. At various moments in the story, Anne remarks that the child has grown; the child is described as having the same blue eyes as Chauvin; the child wants a red motorboat, sustaining the image of red in the story; the child is with Anne throughout the story except when she enters the cafe and when she meditates at night. In addition, the only time the child is not present in the cafe is at the end of Anne's relationship with Chauvin - the last time Anne visits the cafe.

== Title ==
The title is a musical direction, literally "moderately and singingly", and refers to a sonatina by Diabelli, presumably Sonatina in F major, op. 168, No. 1 (I: Moderato cantabile).

== Motifs ==
A number of motifs in Moderato Cantabile occur throughout Duras's works to that point, which some critics argue provides needed context to understanding them, as they are largely ambiguous in the work itself.

Culminating images of violence

There are frequent images of violence throughout each chapter: in the first, the red colour of the sky culminates in a woman's scream, the cry, no doubt, of the murdered woman. In subsequent chapters this violence is replaced with the siren that signals the end of the work day for factory workers. Towards the end it is that of the devouring of food by guests at the reception Anne's husband throws, culminating in Anne's vomiting of the food she consumes.

Magnolia

The first mention of the flower/tree comes in Chapter III, when the child is in the garden. Chauvin remarks that Anne was wearing a magnolia flower between her breasts during a reception, and that her breasts were semi-exposed. Anne also has a magnolia flower in her garden, right outside her window, which she remarks she closes because the smell of magnolia can become too strong at times. The flower/tree represents, no doubt, her sexuality; her closing of the windows signals her inability to handle the sexuality that she has suppressed within her.

Wine

Anne drinks wine throughout the story, initially in order to stifle her trembling when she visits the café to go see Chauvin; the pace of wine drinking reflecting the dramatic arc of the work: building, climaxing in the 7th chapter, then diminishing again in the 8th chapter. She consumes progressively more wine during each meeting with Chauvin, at times "mechanically", and in Chapter 7, she drinks too much wine and winds up vomiting out the wine she had been drinking that day. In the final, 8th chapter, she then drinks the wine "in small mouthfuls" (« à petites gorgées»).

The wine helps her to relax at the setting, and forget about the social burdens she holds. Symbolically, the act describes her casting off of these social burdens, and the image of alcohol as liberation recurs in Duras's works. Biographically, Duras was alcoholic at various periods of her life, giving added weight to this symbol.

Motorboat

The motorboat (vedette) which passes in the open window in the opening scene and briefly recurs, is interpreted as a symbol of freedom, particularly in light of Duras's earlier use of a boat for this purpose in her preceding Le Marin de Gibraltar and Les petits chevaux de Tarquinia.

== Style ==
Moderato Cantabile is loosely identified as part of the nouveau roman movement started by Alain Robbe-Grillet, but critics take pains to distinguish Duras's style as distinct and inimitable. The book was published with the publishing house les Éditions de Minuit, which specialized in avant-garde works, unlike her previous works, which had been published by the more conventional Gallimard. Duras would not publish again with Minuit until Détruire, dit-elle of 1969, and thereafter continued to publish with Minuit.

The style is initially austere: in the initial chapters, the action is described shallowly, at the surface, but changes sharply in Chapter 7, where the narrator is prominent and colors the description, sarcastically describing the "absurd" ritual of dinner and the "devouring" of the salmon and duck. The austere style is the focus of much commentary and of connection with the nouveau roman movement, while the rich seventh chapter is seen as a payoff by some critics, that may not be reached by readers who "shut the book before arriving [there]".

The novella is written in past tense, the French passé simple (usually translated as simple past) and "imparfait" (Imperfect). In Chapter 7, the tense changes noticeably from past to present during the dinner party, and from present to future simple during the last few paragraphs of the chapter.

The format of the bulk of the novel, of a meeting between two people, is particularly prefigured by Le Square ("The Square"), Duras' previous novel, which features two strangers meeting and talking on a park bench one Saturday afternoon, a fact commented on by many critics, but which is also a focus of several, arguably all, of her previous works.

== Reception ==
Moderato Cantabile was very popular, selling half a million copies. Critical response was sharply divided, but generally very positive. A survey of contemporary French critical response is given in the critical edition (Collection "double"), in the section "Moderato Cantabile et la presse française". It was the first winner of the short-lived Prix de Mai.

Critics praised the innovative, austere, "formal", allusive style, a work of suggestive words and gestures. Conversely, the work is criticized as lacking plot, as being more an essay than a work of art, and of lacking context for its images – the symbolism only being apparent in the context of Duras's oeuvre.

Erin Shevaugn Schlumpf suggests that the novel manifests "a feminine melancholy".

== Film adaptation ==
The novel was filmed in 1960 by Peter Brook, and starred Jean-Paul Belmondo and Jeanne Moreau. Moreau won the Best Actress Award at the Cannes Film Festival for her performance.

== Editions ==
- Collection "double", ISBN 2-7073-0314-3
  Critical edition.
