= La Douleur =

1985 book of texts by Marguerite Duras

First edition (publ. POL)

La Douleur (War: A Memoir) is a collection of six texts by Marguerite Duras published in 1985. Two texts are invented: L'ortie brisée and Aurélia Paris. The remaining four texts are based on lived experience. In La Douleur, her husband becomes Robert L. and others also retain the names used as resistants. Monsieur X. dit ici Pierre Rabier, recounts her association with the man who arrested her husband (and his name is changed to protect his wife and child). In Albert des Capitales and Ter le milicien, Duras becomes Thérèse and these are accounts of the immediate aftermath of Paris being liberated, where those who sold the Jews to the Gestapo, and those who served in the Vichy militia were tried by resistance groups. In Albert des Capitales, Thérèse (Duras) extorts a confession under torture of man who sold Jews to the Gestapo. Her colleagues show their disapproval and rather than the expected summary execution, she asks D. to let him walk away.

Introducing the text La Douleur, she says she had forgotten ever writing the diaryin which she recorded her account of the waiting for, and the return of her husband, Robert Antelme (a resistant taken 1 June 1944, found at Dachau, and returned to France moribund by fellow resistance workers Denys Mascolo and François Mitterrand). The diary would seem also to have included an earlier text about Monsieur X, and rewritten to describe a man who as a functionary could not stand to see her not putting on flesh when he wanted her to, but could stand making arrests and sending people to their deaths ("Il supporte d'arrêter, d'envoyer à la mort, mais ça, il ne le supporte pas, que je ne grossisse pas quand il le veut".) In writing about X she says: "I find it extremely difficult to describe his essential stupidity." (J'ai beaucoup de mal à lui décrire son imbécillité essentielle.)

== Critical reception ==
Writing of the translation (The War: A Memoir), Hilary Thayer Hamann calls it "A harsh tale of war but an unforgettable read". Elise Noetinger writes "This book is not a book. It is not a song. Not a poem. Nor thoughts. But tears, pain, crying, despair that one cannot stop nor reason with"

However, Florence de Chalonge (2016) argues that much of the text is rewritten in the 1980s, with considerable additions and deletions, and is critical of the fact that Robert Antelme appears only under his resistance name. She sees the work as being a rewrite of history under the guise of memoir. She summarises the woman of the first four texts as: "the wife mad with pain in her waiting (La Douleur), the prosecution witness in a case against a collaborator too well known and too frequently seen (Monsieur X. dit Pierre Rabier), the vengeful torturer (Albert des Capitales) and the woman who finally desires to make love with Ter (Ter le milicien) (these) are the many shimmering faces of a Frenchwoman under the occupation".

Chalonge considers the text to not be true to the original diaries since much of the anti-Gaullist component has been removed, yet what remains leaves little doubt about Duras' anti-Gaullism: "De Gaulle a dit cette phrase criminelle: Les jours des pleurs sont passés. Les jours de gloire sont revenus. Nous ne pardonnerons jamais" (De Gaulle has said this criminal phrase... We will never pardon him.) "De Gaulle decreed a day of national mourning for Roosevelt, but there is no national day of mourning for the deported". And then there are the descriptions of the officers at the Centre d'Orsay where prisoners, deported Jews, resistants and the forced labourers of the STO are returning and being processed: these officers are dressed immaculately; they are members of the aristocracy; they are members of the right; it is their duty to reduce the women forced labourers of the STO to tears and shame; and when telling Duras to leave, she is "ma petite".
