= Marguerite Duras =

French writer and film director (1914–1996)

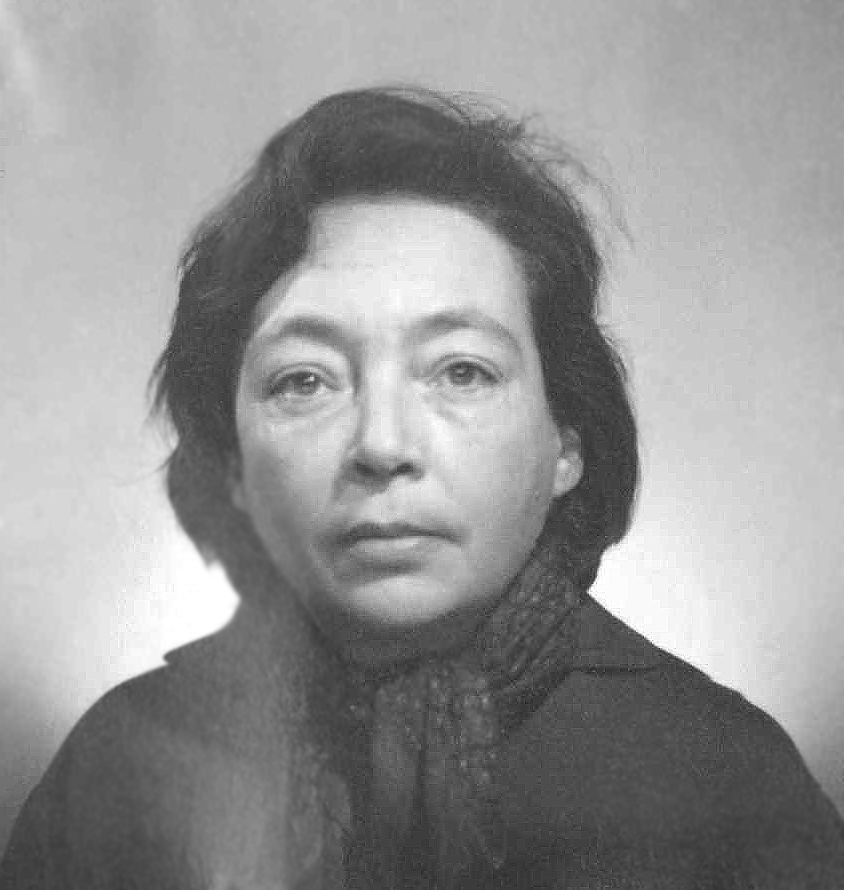
- Duras in 1960
- Born: Marguerite Donnadieu; 4 April 1914; Gia Định, Cochinchina, French Indochina (present-day Ho Chi Minh City, Vietnam)
- Died: 3 March 1996 (aged 81); Paris, France
- Education: Lycée Chasseloup Laubat (Saigon); University of Paris
- Occupations: novelist; playwright; screenwriter; essayist; filmmaker
- Spouses: Robert Antelme (1939-1947); Dionys Mascolo (1947-1956)
- Partner: Yann Andréa (1980-1996)
- Writing career
- Period: 1943–1995

Marguerite Germaine Marie Donnadieu (French: [maʁɡ(ə)ʁit ʒɛʁmɛn maʁi dɔnadjø], 4 April 1914 – 3 March 1996), known as Marguerite Duras (French: [maʁɡ(ə)ʁit dyʁas]), was a French novelist, playwright, screenwriter, essayist, and experimental filmmaker. Her script for the film Hiroshima mon amour (1959) earned her a nomination for Best Original Screenplay at the Academy Awards.

== Early life and education ==
Duras was born Marguerite Donnadieu on 4 April 1914, in Gia Định, Cochinchina, French Indochina (now Vietnam). Her parents, Marie (née Legrand, 1877–1956) and Henri Donnadieu (1872–1921), were teachers from France who likely had met at Gia Định High School. They both had previous marriages. Marguerite had two brothers: Pierre, the older, and the younger Paul.

Duras' father fell ill and he returned to France, where he died in 1921, when Duras was seven years old. Between 1922 and 1924, the family lived in France while her mother was on administrative leave. They then moved back to French Indochina when her mother was assigned to a position in Phnom Penh, then in Vĩnh Long and Sa Đéc. The family struggled financially, and her mother made a bad investment in an isolated property and area of rice farmland in Prey Nob, a story which was fictionalized in Un barrage contre le Pacifique (The Sea Wall).

In 1931, when she was 17, Duras and her family moved to France where she successfully passed the first part of the baccalaureate with the choice of Vietnamese as a foreign language, as she spoke it fluently. Duras returned to Saigon in late 1932 where her mother found a teaching post. There, Marguerite continued her education at the Lycée Chasseloup-Laubat and completed the second part of the baccalaureate, specializing in philosophy.

In autumn 1933, Duras moved to Paris, graduating with a degree in public law in 1936. At the same time, she took classes in mathematics. She continued her education, earning a diplôme d'études supérieures (DES) in public law and, later, in political economy. After finishing her studies in 1937, she found employment with the French government at the Ministry of the Colonies. In 1939, she married the writer Robert Antelme, whom she had met during her studies.

During World War II, from 1942 to 1944, Duras worked for the Vichy government in an office that allocated paper quotas to publishers and in the process operated a de facto book-censorship system. She then became an active member of the clandestine French Communist Party and a member of the French Resistance as a part of a small group that also included François Mitterrand, who later became President of France and remained a lifelong friend of hers. Duras' husband, Antelme, was deported to Buchenwald in 1944 for his involvement in the Resistance, and barely survived the experience (weighing on his release, according to Duras, just 38 kg, or 84 pounds). She nursed him back to health, but they divorced once he recovered.

In 1943, when publishing her first novel, she began to use the surname Duras, after the town that her father came from, Duras, Lot-et-Garonne.

In 1950, her mother returned to France from Indochina, wealthy from property investments and from the boarding school she had run.

== Career ==
Duras was the author of many novels, plays, films, interviews, essays, and works of short fiction, including her best-selling, highly fictionalized autobiographical work L'Amant (1984), translated into English as The Lover, which describes her youthful affair with a Chinese-Vietnamese man. It won the Prix Goncourt in 1984. The story of her adolescence also appears in three other books: The Sea Wall, Eden Cinema and The North China Lover. A film version of The Lover, produced by Claude Berri and directed by Jean-Jacques Annaud, was released in 1992. Duras's novel The Sea Wall was first adapted into the 1958 film This Angry Age by René Clément, and again in 2008 by Cambodian director Rithy Panh as The Sea Wall.

Other major works include Moderato Cantabile (1958), which was the basis of the 1960 film Seven Days... Seven Nights; Le Ravissement de Lol V. Stein (1964); and her play India Song, which Duras herself later directed as a film in 1975. She was also the screenwriter of the 1959 French film Hiroshima mon amour, which was directed by Alain Resnais. Duras's early novels were fairly conventional in form, and were criticized for their "romanticism" by fellow writer Raymond Queneau; however, with Moderato Cantabile, she became more experimental, paring down her texts to give ever-increasing importance to what was not said. She was associated with the nouveau roman French literary movement, although she did not belong definitively to any one group. She was noted for her command of dialogue.

In 1971, Duras signed the Manifesto of the 343, thereby announcing that she had had an abortion.

According to literature and film scholars Madeleine Cottenet-Hage and Robert P. Kolker, Duras' provocative cinema between 1973 and 1983 was concerned with a single "ideal" image, at the same time both "an absolute vacant image and an absolute meaningful image," while also focused on the verbal text. They said her films purposely lacked realistic representation, such as divorcing image from sound and using space symbolically.

Many of her works, such as Le Ravissement de Lol V. Stein and L'Homme assis dans le couloir (1980), deal with human sexuality.

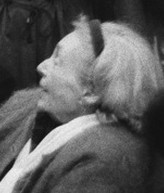
Duras in 1993

Towards the end of her life, Duras published a short, 54-page autobiographical book as a goodbye to her readers and family. The last entry was written on 1 August 1995 and read "I think it is all over. That my life is finished. I am no longer anything. I have become an appalling sight. I am falling apart. Come quickly. I no longer have a mouth, no longer a face". Duras died at her home in Paris on 3 March 1996, aged 81.

== Personal life ==
During the later stages of World War II, she endured separation from her husband, Robert Antelme, following his imprisonment in Buchenwald. During his captivity that she wrote La Douleur. Believing that fidelity was an absurd notion, Duras began an affair with writer Dionys Mascolo while still married to Antelme, creating a ménage à trois. He later fathered her son, Jean Mascolo.

Duras had a wide circle of influential friends, ranging from writers and artists to intellectuals and even criminals. Her friend, the psychoanalyst Jacques Lacan, once remarked, "Marguerite Duras turns out to know what I teach without me," in praise of her novel Le Ravissement de Lol V. Stein.

During the final two decades of her life, Duras experienced significant health problems. In 1980, she was hospitalized for the first time due to a combination of alcohol and tranquilizers. She also underwent detoxification to address her alcohol addiction. After being hospitalized again in October 1988, she fell into a coma that lasted until June 1989.

In parallel with her health issues during the 1980s, Duras began a relationship with Yann Lemée, a.k.a. Yann Andréa, a homosexual aspiring writer, 38 years her junior. He helped Duras through her health difficulties. Duras detailed these interactions and companionship in her final book, Yann Andréa Steiner.

Duras' health continued to decline in the 1990s. She died on 3 March 1996.

== Reception and legacy ==
Samuel Beckett described hearing the radio adaptation of Le Square in 1957 as an "overwhelmingly moving" and significant moment in his life.

The 2021 French mini-series Une affaire française (aka A French Case) depicts Duras (played by a chain-smoking Dominique Blanc) in a damning light, as she insinuates herself into the investigation of a 1984 child murder case by accusing the mother of the crime.

Andréa's account of his relationship with Duras was adapted for the screen in a 2022 Claire Simon film entitled Vous ne désirez que moi (a phrase directed at Andréa by Duras) with Swann Arlaud as Andréa and Emmanuelle Devos as journalist Michèle Manceaux, later issued on DVD by Blaq Out.

A fictional version of Duras appears in one of the stories of Fiona Sze-Lorrain's novel in stories Dear Chrysanthemums (Scribner, 2023).

== Bibliography ==
=== Novels and stories ===
- Les Impudents (Plon, 1943). The Impudent Ones, trans. Kelsey L. Haskett (The New Press, 2021)
- La Vie tranquille (Gallimard, 1944). The Easy Life, trans. Olivia Baes and Emma Ramadan (2022)
- Un barrage contre le Pacifique (Gallimard, 1950). The Sea Wall, trans. Herma Briffault (1952); also as A Sea of Troubles, trans. Antonia White (1953)
- Le Marin de Gibraltar (Gallimard, 1952). The Sailor from Gibraltar, trans. Barbara Bray (1966)
- Les Petits Chevaux de Tarquinia (Gallimard, 1953). The Little Horses of Tarquinia, trans. Peter DuBerg (1960)
- Des journées entières dans les arbres (Gallimard, 1954). Whole Days in the Trees, trans. Anita Barrows (1984). Includes three other novellas: "Le Boa", "Madame Dodin", "Les Chantiers"
- Le Square (Gallimard, 1955). The Square, trans. Sonia Pitt-Rivers and Irina Morduch (1959)
- Moderato cantabile (Les Éditions de Minuit, 1958). Moderato Cantabile, trans. Richard Seaver (1960)
- Dix heures et demie du soir en été (Gallimard, 1960). 10:30 on a Summer Night, trans. Anne Borchardt (1961)
- L'Après-midi de M. Andesmas (Gallimard, 1962). The Afternoon of Mr. Andesmas, trans. Anne Borchardt and Barbara Bray (1964)
- Le Ravissement de Lol V. Stein (Gallimard, 1964). The Ravishing of Lol Stein, trans. Richard Seaver (1964); also as The Rapture of Lol V. Stein, trans. Eileen Ellenbogen (1967)
- Le Vice-Consul (Gallimard, 1965). The Vice-Consul, trans. Eileen Ellenborgener (1968)
- L'Amante anglaise (Gallimard, 1967). L'Amante anglaise, trans. Barbara Bray (1968)
- Détruire, dit-elle (Les Éditions de Minuit, 1969). Destroy, She Said, trans. Barbara Bray (1970)
- Abahn Sabana David (Gallimard, 1970). Abahn Sabana David, trans. Kazim Ali (2016)
- Ah! Ernesto (Harlin Quist, 1971)
- L'Amour (Gallimard, 1972). L'Amour, trans. Kazim Ali and Libby Murphy (2013)
- Vera Baxter ou les Plages de l'Atlantique (Albatros, 1980)
- L'Homme assis dans le couloir (Les Éditions de Minuit, 1980). The Man Sitting in the Corridor, trans. Barbara Bray (1991)
- L'Homme atlantique (Les Éditions de Minuit, 1982). The Atlantic Man, trans. Alberto Manguel (1993)
- La Maladie de la mort (Les Éditions de Minuit, 1982). The Malady of Death, trans. Barbara Bray (1986)
- L'Amant (Les Éditions de Minuit, 1984). The Lover, trans. Barbara Bray (1985). Awarded the 1984 Prix Goncourt.
- La Douleur (POL, 1985). The War, trans. Barbara Bray (1986)
- Les Yeux bleus, Cheveux noirs (Les Éditions de Minuit, 1986). Blue Eyes, Black Hair, trans. Barbara Bray (1987)
- La Pute de la côte normande (Les Éditions de Minuit, 1986). The Slut of the Normandy Coast, trans. Alberto Manguel (1993)
- Emily L. (Les Éditions de Minuit, 1987). Emily L., trans. Barbara Bray (1989)
- La Pluie d'été (POL, 1990). Summer Rain, trans. Barbara Bray (1992)
- L'Amant de la Chine du Nord (Gallimard, 1991). The North China Lover, trans. Leigh Hafrey (1992)
- Yann Andréa Steiner (Gallimard, 1992). Yann Andrea Steiner, trans. Barbara Bray (1993)
- Écrire (Gallimard, 1993). Writing, trans. Mark Polizzotti (2011)

=== Collections ===
- L'Été 80 (Les Éditions de Minuit, 1980)
- Outside (Albin Michel, 1981). Outside, trans. Arthur Goldhammer (1986)
- La Vie matérielle (POL, 1987). Practicalities, trans. Barbara Bray (1990)
- Les Yeux verts (Cahiers du cinéma, n.312–313, June 1980 and a new edition, 1987). Green Eyes, trans. Carol Barko (1990)
- C'est tout (POL, 1995). No More, trans. Richard Howard (1998)

=== Theatre ===
- Les Viaducs de la Seine et Oise (Gallimard, 1959). The Viaducts of Seine-et-Oise, trans. Barbara Bray, in Three Plays (1967)
- Théâtre I: Les Eaux et Forêts; Le Square; La Musica (Gallimard, 1965)
  - The Square, trans. Barbara Bray and Sonia Orwell, in Three Plays (1967)
  - La Musica, trans. Barbara Bray (1975)
- L'Amante anglaise (Gallimard, 1968). L'Amante anglaise, trans. Barbara Bray (1975)
- Théâtre II: Suzanna Andler; Des journées entières dans les arbres; Yes, peut-être; Le Shaga; Un homme est venu me voir (Gallimard, 1968)
  - Suzanna Andler, trans. Barbara Bray (1975)
  - Days in the Trees, trans. Barbara Bray and Sonia Orwell, in Three Plays (1967)
- India Song (Gallimard, 1973). India Song, trans. Barbara Bray (1976)
- L'Eden Cinéma (Mercure de France, 1977). Eden Cinema, trans. Barbara Bray, in Four Plays (1992)
- Agatha (Les Éditions de Minuit, 1981). Agatha, trans. Howard Limoli (1992)
- Savannah Bay (Les Éditions de Minuit, 1982; revised, 1983). Savannah Bay, trans. Barbara Bray, in Four Plays (1992); also by Howard Limoli (1992)
- Théâtre III: La Bête dans la jungle; Les Papiers d'Aspern; La Danse de mort (Gallimard, 1984)
- La Musica deuxième (Gallimard, 1985). La Musica deuxième, trans. Barbara Bray, in Four Plays (1992)

=== Screenplays ===
- Hiroshima mon amour (directed by Alain Resnais, 1959). Trans. Richard Seaver (Gallimard, 1961)
- Une aussi longue absence (with Gérard Jarlot) (Gallimard, 1961). Une aussi longue absence, trans. Barbara Wright (1961)
- The Sailor from Gibraltar (original story), Le Marin de Gibraltar, adapted by Christopher Isherwood, directed by Tony Richardson (1967)
- Nathalie Granger, suivi de La Femme du Gange (Gallimard, 1973)
- Le Camion, suivi de Entretien avec Michelle Porte (Les Éditions de Minuit, 1977). The Darkroom, trans. Alta Ifland and Eireene Nealand (Contra Mundum Press, 2021)
- Le Navire Night, suivi de Cesarée, les Mains négatives, Aurélia Steiner (Mercure de France, 1979). The Ship "Night", trans. Susan Dwyer
- The Lover (original story), L'Amant, adapted and directed by Jean-Jacques Annaud (1992)

=== Interviews ===
- Les Parleuses, with Xavière Gauthier (Les Éditions de Minuit, 1974). Woman to Woman, trans. Katharine A. Jensen (1987)
- La Passion suspendue, with Leopoldina Pallotta della Torre (Le Seuil, 2013). Suspended Passion, trans. Chris Turner (2016)

=== Compilations in English ===
- Four Novels: The Square, Moderato Cantabile, 10:30 on a Summer Night, The Afternoon of Mr. Andesmas (Grove, 1966)
- Three Plays: The Square, Days in the Trees, The Viaducts of Seine-et-Oise (Calder & Boyars, 1967)
- Three Novels: The Square, Ten-thirty on a Summer Night, The Afternoon of Monsieur Andesmas (Calder, 1977)
- Four Plays: La Musica (La Musica Deuxième), Eden Cinema, Savannah Bay, India Song, trans. Barbara Bray (Oberon Books, 1992)
- Agatha / Savannah Bay: 2 Plays, trans. Howard Limoli (Post-Apollo Press, 1992)
- Two by Duras: The Slut of the Normandy Coast / The Atlantic Man, trans. Alberto Manguel (Coach House, 1993)

== Filmography ==
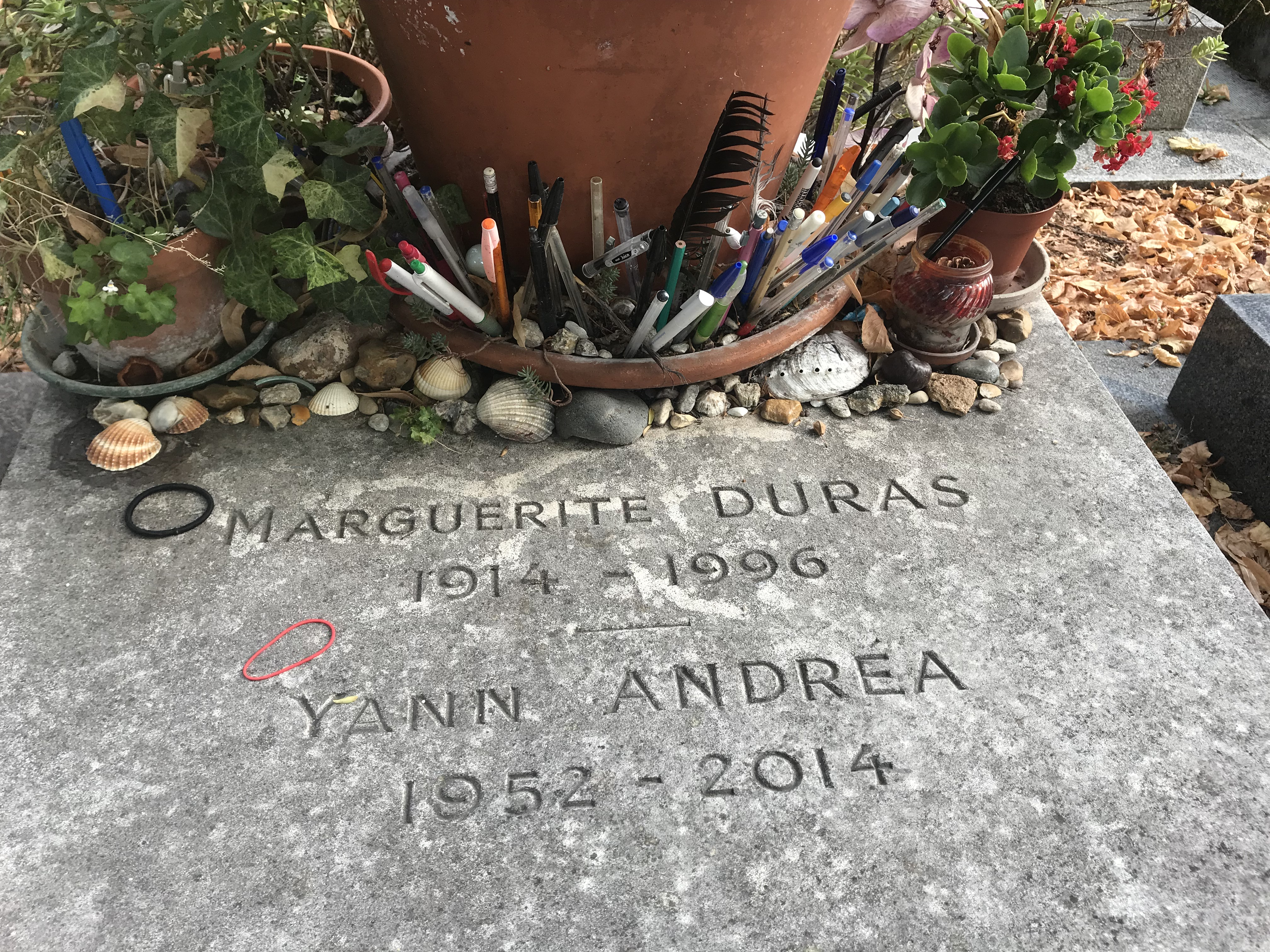
Grave of Marguerite Duras, Montparnasse Cemetery, with pens, pencils, and feathers, in and around, potted plants, on her grave.

=== Director ===
- La Musica (1967)
- Destroy, She Said (1969)
- Jaune le soleil (1972)
- Nathalie Granger (1972)
- Woman of Ganges (1974)
- India Song (1975)
- Son nom de Venise dans Calcutta désert (1976)
- Des journées entières dans les arbres (1977)
- Le Camion (1977)
- Baxter, Vera Baxter (1977)
- Les Mains négatives (1978)
- Césarée (1978)
- Le Navire Night (1979)
- Aurelia Steiner (Melbourne) (1979)
- Aurélia Steiner (Vancouver) (1979)
- Agatha et les lectures illimitées (1981)
- L'Homme atlantique (1981)
- Il dialogo di Roma (1983)
- Les Enfants (1985)

=== Actor ===
- India Song (1975) – (voice)
- The Lorry (1977) – Elle
- Baxter, Vera Baxter (1977) – Narrator (voice, uncredited)
- Le Navire Night (1979) – (voice)
- Aurélia Steiner (Vancouver) (1979) – Narrator (voice)
- Every Man for Himself (1980) – (voice)
- Agatha et les Lectures illimitées (1981) – (voice)
- Les Enfants (1985) – Narration (voice, uncredited) (final film role)

== Awards and honors ==
- 1958: Prix de Mai for Moderato cantabile
- 1962: Prix de la Tribune de Paris for L'Après-midi de Monsieur Andesmas
- 1972: Official selection at Venice Film Festival for the film Nathalie Granger
- 1975: Prix de l'Association française des cinémas d'art et d'essai à Cannes for India Song
- 1976: Prix Jean-Cocteau for the film Des journées entières dans les arbres
- 1983: Grand prix du théâtre de l'Académie française
- 1984: Prix Goncourt for L'Amant
- 1986: Ritz Paris Hemingway Award for The Lover
