= This Angry Age =

1957 film by René Clément

- U.S. film poster
- Directed by: René Clément
- Written by: Irwin Shaw; Diego Fabbri; René Clément; Ivo Perilli
- Based on: The Sea Wall (1950 novel) by Marguerite Duras
- Produced by: Dino De Laurentiis
- Starring: Anthony Perkins; Silvana Mangano; Richard Conte; Jo Van Fleet; Alida Valli
- Cinematography: Otello Martelli
- Edited by: Leo Catozzo; Henri Rust (sup.)
- Music by: Nino Rota
- Production company: De Laurentiis Cinematografica; Columbia Pictures
- Distributed by: Columbia Pictures
- Release dates: October 31, 1957 (Italy); June 25, 1958 (U.S.)
- Running time: 105 minutes
- Country: Italy; United States
- Language: English

This Angry Age (Italian: La diga sul Pacifico, lit. 'The dam on the Pacific') is a 1957 drama film directed and co-written by René Clément, produced by Dino De Laurentiis, based on Marguerite Duras' 1950 novel The Sea Wall. It stars Anthony Perkins, Silvana Mangano, Richard Conte, Jo Van Fleet, and Alida Valli.

== Plot ==
20-year-old Joseph Dufresne and his 16-year-old sister Suzanne live in the merciless conditions of French Indochina with their widowed mother. Their overbearing mother attempts to exert a hold on her children by involving them in the family's run-down rice plantation. However the siblings seek liberation, and look for this in their romantic lives. Suzanne becomes involved with Michael and Joseph finds a love interest in Claude.

== Cast ==
- Anthony Perkins as Joseph Dufresne
- Silvana Mangano as Suzanne Dufresne
- Richard Conte as Michael
- Jo Van Fleet as Mme. Dufresne
- Alida Valli as Claude
- Nehemiah Persoff as Albert
- Yvonne Sanson as Carmen
- Guido Celano as Bart
- Larry Williams as Roland

== Production ==
Clément purchased the film rights to the Duras novel in 1956. The original male lead was supposed to have been James Dean, but he was replaced by Perkins after his death in 1955. Mangano, the wife of producer Dino De Laurentiis, was cast in the female lead. Clément wanted Peter Ustinov to play Albert, but he declined due to a theatrical commitment.

Clément shot the film in wide-screen Technirama and Technicolor. Following the end of French Indochina, Clément could not film in the newly independent Vietnam as nationalist struggles continued there. Thus, Clément and production designer Mario Chiari reconstructed the story's setting in Thailand, with studio interiors shot at Cinecittà in Rome.

== Reception ==
The New York Times described Clément as "a specialist in that sort of tragedy that evolves from the inability of deeply pained people to face their own feelings." The reviewer also praised the "great pictorial beauty and admirable psychological truth" of Clément's film. The reviewer also praised how the "crumbling of the dam against the assaults of the river stands as an image of what is going on within the family."

The film was also a critical success in France, being lauded as "a complete success, a chef-d'œuvre", although François Truffaut did not share this enthusiasm, accusing Clément of directing "his career". He added that "For Clément, the essential thing is that the film he is making costs more than the last one and less than the next."

Duras was dismayed by the absence of certain colonial themes that were important in her novel. She said she felt "betrayed" and "dishonoured" by the film.

== Later adaptation ==
Duras' novel was adapted again in 2008 by Rithy Panh as The Sea Wall, starring Isabelle Huppert and Gaspard Ulliel.

== See also ==
- List of American films of 1958
