= Bernard Pingaud =

French politician and writer (1923–2020)

- Born: 12 October 1923; Paris, France
- Died: 25 February 2020 (aged 96); Uzès, France
- Occupations: Politician, writer
- Political party: Socialist Party

Bernard Pingaud (French: [bɛʁnaʁ pɛ̃ɡo]; 12 October 1923 – 25 February 2020) was a French politician and writer.

== Education and career ==
Pingaud studied at the Lycée Pasteur in Neuilly-sur-Seine and the Lycée Henri IV in Paris. In 1943, he enrolled at the École normale supérieure, and then became the debate secretary for the French National Assembly until 1974. He published his first novel in 1943, titled Mon beau navire.

During the Algerian War, Pingaud was one of the people who signed the Manifesto of the 121. In 1968, he founded the Union des écrivains with Jean-Pierre Faye and Michel Butor. After leading the union until 1973, Pingaud led the group Secrétariat à l'Action Culturelle of the Socialist Party until 1979.

In 1981, Jack Lang appointed him as president of the Commission de réflexion sur la politique du livre et de la lecture. In 1982, he published the Pingaud-Barreau report.

From 1983 to 1987, Pingaud served as a cultural adviser for the Embassy of France in Cairo. From 1990 to 1993, he was president of the Maison des écrivains et de la littérature in Paris. He was one of the primary writers for the magazine L'Arc.

== Personal life and death ==
Pingaud lived in Collias from 1997 until his death. He was the father of Denis Pingaud.

Bernard Pingaud died on 25 February 2020 at the age of 96.

== Works ==
=== Novels and stories ===
- Mon beau navire (1946)
- L’Amour triste (1950)
- Le Prisonnier (1958)
- La Scène primitive (1965)
- La Voix de son maître (1973)
- L’Imparfait (1973)
- Adieu Kafka (1989)
- Bartoldi le comédien (1996)
- Tu n’es plus là (1998)
- Au nom du frère (2002)
- L’Andante inconnu (2003)
- Mon roman et moi (2003)
- L’Horloge de verre (2011)
- Vous (2015)

=== Essays ===
- Hollande (1954)
- Mme de la Fayette (1959)
- Tonia Cariffa (1961)
- Inventaire (1965)
- Entretiens (1966)
- Comme un chemin en automne, Inventaire II (1979)
- Le livre à son prix (1983)
- L’Expérience romanesque (1983)
- Les infortunes de la raison (1992)
- Les Anneaux du manège. Écriture et littérature (1992)
- Écrire (2000)
- La Bonne Aventure (2007)
- Une tâche sans fin (1940-2008) (2009)
- L’Occupation des oisifs (2013)
