= The Sea Wall (novel) =

1950 novel by Marguerite Duras

- First English edition
- Author: Marguerite Duras
- Original title: Un barrage contre le Pacifique
- Language: French
- Publisher: Éditions Gallimard (French); Pellegrini & Cudahy (US)
- Publication date: 1950
- Publication place: France
- English publication date: 1952
- Pages: 315

The Sea Wall (French: Un barrage contre le Pacifique) is a 1950 novel by the French writer Marguerite Duras. It was adapted for film in 1958 as This Angry Age and in 2008 as The Sea Wall. Inspired largely by her own adolescence in French Indochina, Duras wrote this novel in 1950, just after divorcing her first husband and remarrying.

== Summary ==
In the south of French Indochina, in 1931, a widow is living with her two children, Joseph and Suzanne (19/20 and 16/17 years old). Their isolated and uncultivable concession is located in the marsh plain of Ram (Prey-Nop, Sihanoukville Province). Their living conditions are deplorable: they are often forced to eat wading birds, the mother had saved for 15 years to be awarded the concession, which is uncultivable, with her crops being destroyed each year by inundations from the sea (despite the dam-building of the family). The mother, disillusioned after seeing her dams destroyed by the invincible Pacific (in fact the China Sea) and harassed by a corrupt administration, begins to sink into madness.

The story opens with the death of their old horse, bought a few days earlier. This death leads to a visit to the city of Ram, where they meet Monsieur Jo, a young and wealthy planter. He wears a huge diamond on his finger, and, in spite of the ugliness of his face, the mother forms the wish that he marry her daughter. Monsieur Jo, fascinated by Suzanne, comes each day to the bungalow. The mother monitors their interviews to prevent physical contact, leaving marriage as the sole solution for the satisfaction of his desire.

Monsieur Jo gets caught up in the game, trying to buy Suzanne to see her naked by offering her cosmetics, a dress, and a phonograph. Faced with an ultimatum of the mother, he offers Suzanne a diamond. This gift marks the end of Monsieur Jo's relationship with the family, which later discovers that the ring is not as valuable as they thought because of a flaw. This discovery is the despair of the mother who wants to sell the diamond for its supposed value.

Finally, Joseph, Suzanne's brother, meets a young woman who agrees to buy the diamond for more than it is worth but then returns it. The condition of the mother worsens. Increasingly weaker, she finally agrees to resell the diamond at its true value. Joseph ends up leaving the house with the young woman, and Suzanne is about to leave too when the mother dies. Joseph returns one last time and, with the servants, the children bury the mother on the concession. To take revenge on the administration, Joseph entrusts his guns to the locals so that, following the wish of the mother, they can kill the cadastral employees responsible for their troubles. Suzanne, meanwhile, has lost her virginity to a planter neighbor's son, whom she does not plan to marry, and goes off on her own.

This novel offers the story of Indochinese disillusion and is autobiographical in inspiration.

== Characters ==
Joseph

- Age: 20 years
- Main activity: Hunting
- Physical portrait: handsome, and strong. (unlike Monsieur Jo)

Suzanne

- Age: 17 years old
- Physical portrait: A beautiful girl.

(The name of Suzanne refers to the Bible and the episode of "Susanna and the Elders" or "Suzanne in the bath", which here is replayed as Monsieur Jo asking to see Suzanne naked in the shower.)

The mother

- Age undefined, probably between 40 and 50 years
- Activity: Teacher and private teacher, she becomes a pianist in a cinema after the death of her husband to make extra money. She finally buys the concession, but finds she has been cheated, with the land being worthless since it floods with salt each year despite her efforts.
- Physical portrait: A woman worn out by life.
- Character: Stubborn, and somewhat unrealistic.

Monsieur Jo

- Age: he "looks like he's 25 years old".
- No real activity, he lives off his father, a wealthy planter established in the north of Indochina.
- Physical portrait: very ugly

Carmen

- Activity: Pimp, manager of a hotel.
- Physical portrait: This former prostitute has an ugly face but legs to dream about.
- Character: Archetype of the "big-hearted whore", Carmen easily helps her neighbours.

== Film adaptations ==
- 1958: Barrage contre le Pacifique, directed by René Clément, with Jo Van Fleet (the mother), Anthony Perkins (Joseph), Silvana Mangano (Suzanne).
- 2008: Un barrage contre le Pacifique, directed by Rithy Panh, with Isabelle Huppert (the mother), Gaspard Ulliel (Joseph), Astrid Bergès-Frisbey (Suzanne).

== See also ==
- 1950 in literature
- 20th-century French literature
