= French literature =

Written work in the French language

French literature (French: littérature française) generally speaking, is literature written in the French language, particularly by French citizens; it may also refer to literature written by people living in France who speak traditional languages of France other than French. Literature written in the French language by citizens of other nations such as Belgium, Switzerland, Canada, Senegal, Tunisia, Algeria, Morocco, etc. is referred to as Francophone literature.

For centuries, French literature has been an object of national pride for French people, and it has been one of the most influential aspects of the literature of Europe. France ranks first on the list of Nobel Prizes in literature by country.

One of the first known examples of French literature is the Song of Roland, the first major work in a series of poems known as, "chansons de geste".

The French language is a Romance language derived from Latin and heavily influenced principally by Gaulish and Frankish. Beginning in the 11th century, literature written in medieval French was one of the oldest vernacular (non-Latin) literatures in western Europe and it became a key source of literary themes in the Middle Ages across the continent.

Although the European prominence of French literature was eclipsed in part by vernacular literature in Italy in the 14th century, literature in France in the 16th century underwent a major creative evolution, and through the political and artistic programs of the Ancien Régime, French literature came to dominate European letters in the 17th century.

In the 18th century, French became the literary lingua franca and diplomatic language of western Europe (and, to a certain degree, in America), and French letters have had a profound impact on all European and American literary traditions while at the same time being heavily influenced by these other national traditions. Africa and the far East have brought the French language to non-European cultures that are transforming and adding to the French literary experience today.

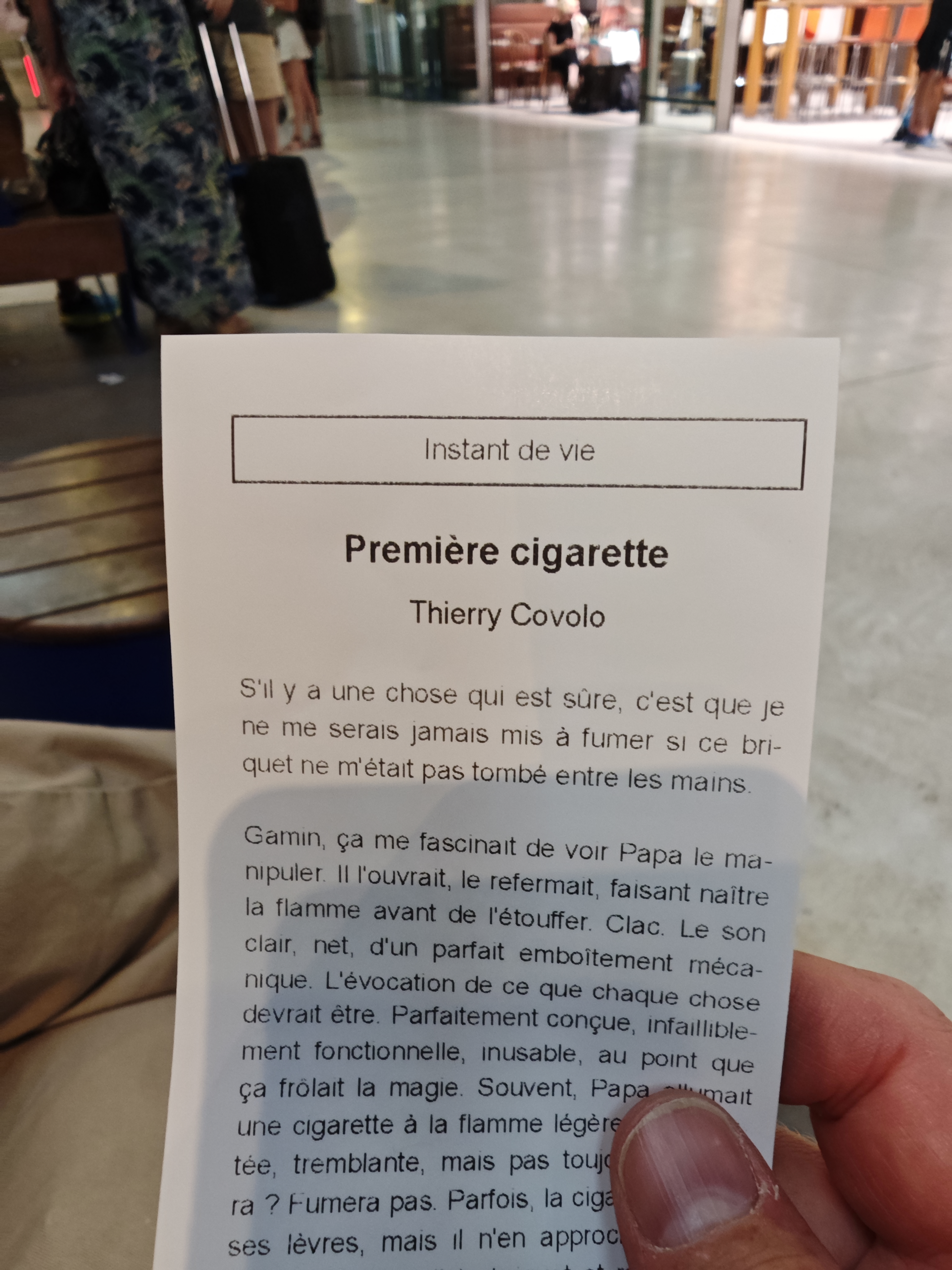
Reading a contemporary French short story booklet

Under the aristocratic ideals of the Ancien Régime (the "honnête homme"), the nationalist spirit of post-revolutionary France, and the mass educational ideals of the Third Republic and modern France, the French have come to have a profound cultural attachment to their literary heritage. Today, French schools emphasize the study of novels, theater and poetry (often learnt by heart). The literary arts are heavily sponsored by the state and literary prizes are major news. The Académie française and the Institut de France are important linguistic and artistic institutions in France, and French television features shows on writers and poets (one of the most watched shows on French television was Apostrophes, a weekly talk show on literature and the arts). Literature matters deeply to the people of France and plays an important role in their sense of identity.

As of 2022, fifteen French authors have been awarded the Nobel Prize in Literature which is more than novelists, poets and essayists of any other country. In 1964 Jean-Paul Sartre was awarded the Nobel Prize in Literature, but he declined it, stating that "It is not the same thing if I sign Jean-Paul Sartre or if I sign Jean-Paul Sartre, Nobel Prize winner. A writer must refuse to allow himself to be transformed into an institution, even if it takes place in the most honorable form."

== French Nobel Prize in Literature winners ==
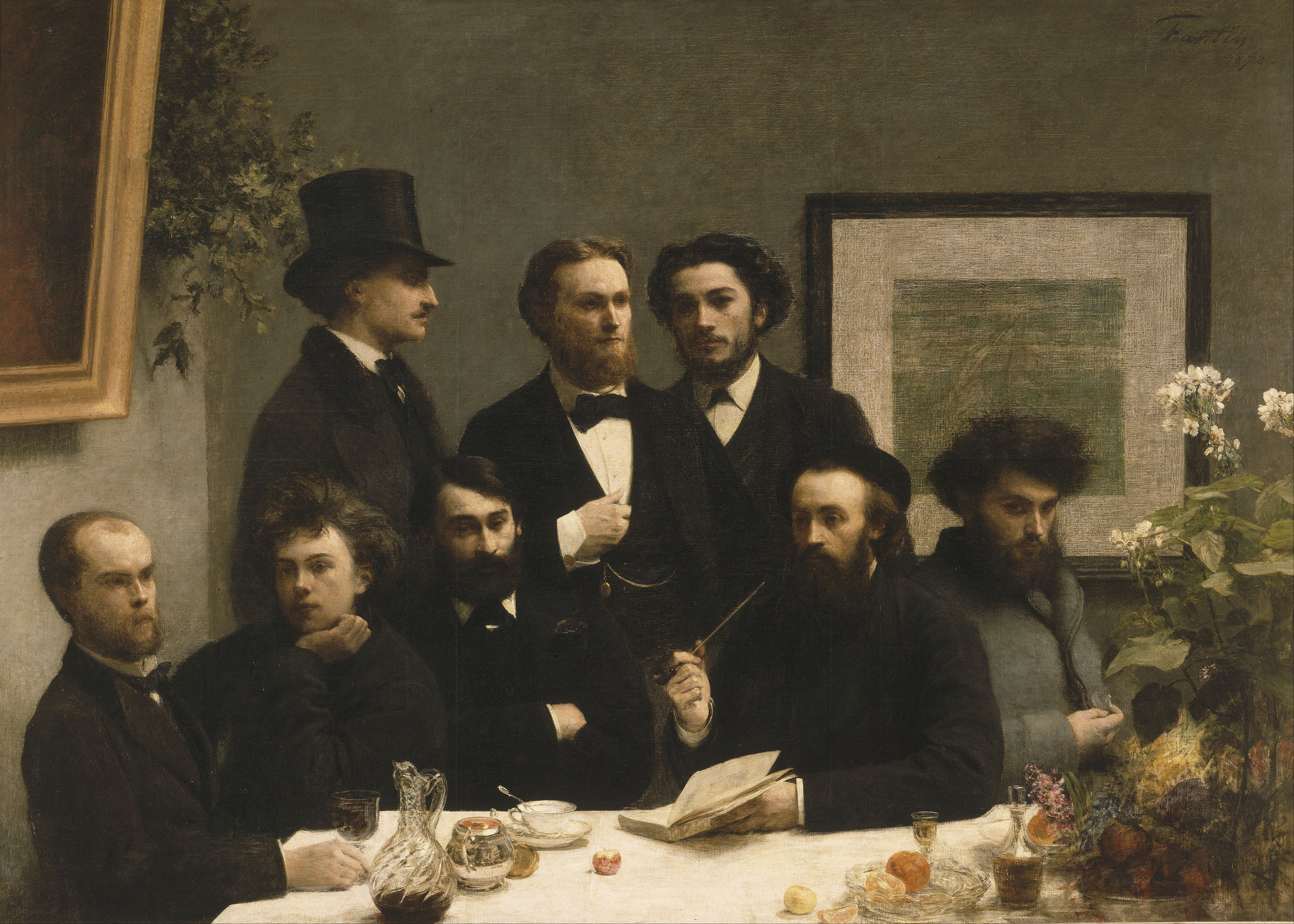
Paul Verlaine (far left) and Arthur Rimbaud (second to left) in an 1872 painting by Henri Fantin-Latour.

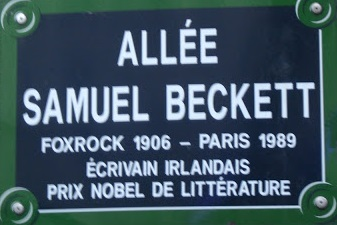
Samuel Beckett Walk, Paris (France). Nobel Prize 1969.

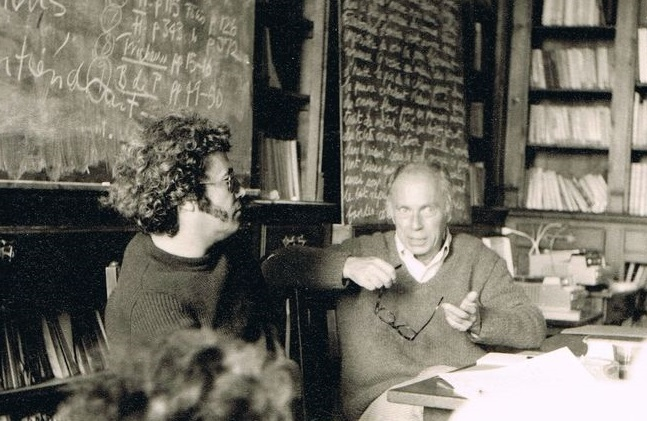
Seminar with Claude Simon, Cerisy (France). Nobel Prize 1985.

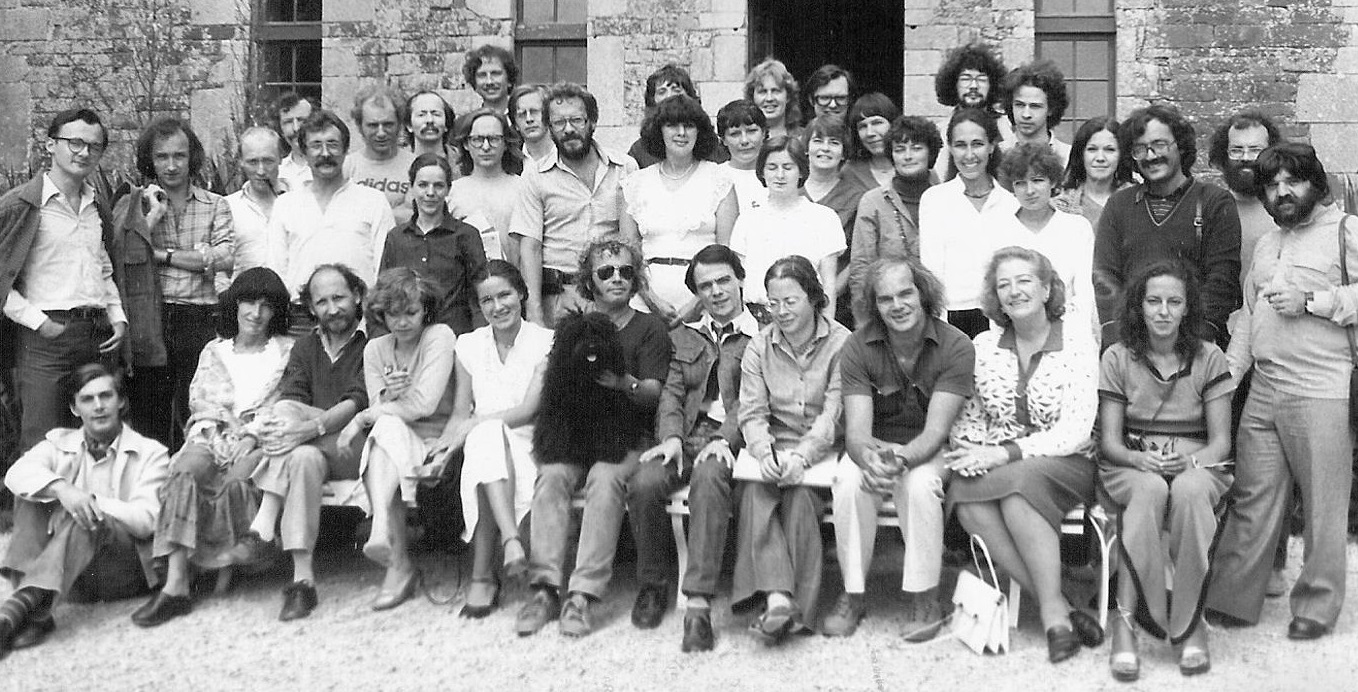
French contemporary literature workshop with Marc Avelot, Philippe Binant, Bernard Magné, Claudette Oriol-Boyer, Jean Ricardou, Cerisy (France), 1980.

For most of the 20th century, French authors had more Literature Nobel Prizes than those of any other nation. The following French or French language authors have won a Nobel Prize in Literature:

- 1901 – Sully Prudhomme (The first Nobel Prize in Literature)
- 1904 – Frédéric Mistral (wrote in Occitan)
- 1915 – Romain Rolland
- 1921 – Anatole France
- 1927 – Henri Bergson
- 1937 – Roger Martin du Gard
- 1947 – André Gide
- 1952 – François Mauriac
- 1957 – Albert Camus
- 1960 – Saint-John Perse
- 1964 – Jean-Paul Sartre (declined the prize)
- 1969 – Samuel Beckett (Irish, wrote in English and French)
- 1985 – Claude Simon
- 2008 – J. M. G. Le Clézio
- 2014 – Patrick Modiano
- 2022 – Annie Ernaux

== French literary awards ==
- Grand Prix de Littérature Policière – created in 1948, for crime and detective fiction.
- Grand Prix du roman de l'Académie française – created 1918.
- Prix Décembre – created in 1989.
- Prix Femina – created 1904, decided each year by an exclusively female jury, although the authors of the winning works do not have to be women.
- Prix Goncourt – created 1903, given to the author of "the best and most imaginative prose work of the year".
- Prix Goncourt des Lycéens – created in 1987.
- Prix Littéraire Valery Larbaud – created in 1957.
- Prix Médicis – created 1958, awarded to an author whose "fame does not yet match their talent."
- Prix Renaudot – created in 1926.
- Prix Tour-Apollo Award – 1972–1990, given to the best science fiction novel published in French during the preceding year.
- Prix des Deux Magots – created in 1933.

== Key texts ==
=== Fiction ===
- Middle Ages
  - anonymous – La Chanson de Roland (The Song of Roland)
  - Chrétien de Troyes – Yvain ou le Chevalier au Lion (Yvain, the Knight of the Lion), Lancelot, ou le Chevalier à la charrette (Lancelot, the Knight of the Cart)
  - Marie de France – Lais
  - various – Tristan et Iseult (Tristan and Iseult)
  - anonymous – Lancelot-Graal (Lancelot-Grail), also known as the prose Lancelot or the Vulgate Cycle
  - anonymous – Roman de Renart
  - Guillaume de Lorris and Jean de Meung – Roman de la Rose ("Romance of the Rose")
  - Christine de Pizan – "The Book of the City of Ladies"
- 16th century
  - François Rabelais – La vie de Gargantua et de Pantagruel ("Gargantua and Pantagruel")
  - Hélisenne de Crenne – The Torments of Love
  - Marguerite de Navarre – Heptaméron
- 17th century
  - Honoré d'Urfé – L'Astrée
  - Madame de Lafayette – La Princesse de Clèves
  - François Fénelon – The Adventures of Telemachus
  - Madame d'Aulnoy – Les Contes des Fées ("Fairy Tales", a fairy tale collection including The Blue Bird and The Story of Pretty Goldilocks), Contes Nouveaux ou Les Fées à la Mode ("New Tales, or Fairies in Fashion", a fairy tale collection including The White Cat)
  - Charles Perrault – Histoires ou contes du temps passé ("Stories or Tales from Past Times, with Morals", a fairy tale collection which includes Sleeping Beauty and Little Red Riding Hood)
- 18th century
  - Antoine Galland – Les Mille et une nuits ("The Thousand and One Nights", a fairy tale collection, which includes Aladdin and Ali Baba and the Forty Thieves)
  - Abbé Prévost – Manon Lescaut
  - Voltaire – Candide, Zadig ou la Destinée
  - Jean-Jacques Rousseau – Julie, ou la nouvelle Héloïse (Julie or the New Heloise)
  - Denis Diderot – Jacques le fataliste (Jacques the Fatalist)
  - Montesquieu – Persian Letters
  - Pierre Choderlos de Laclos – Les Liaisons dangereuses (Dangerous Liaisons)
  - Jacques-Henri Bernardin de Saint-Pierre – Paul et Virginie (Paul and Virginia)
- 19th century

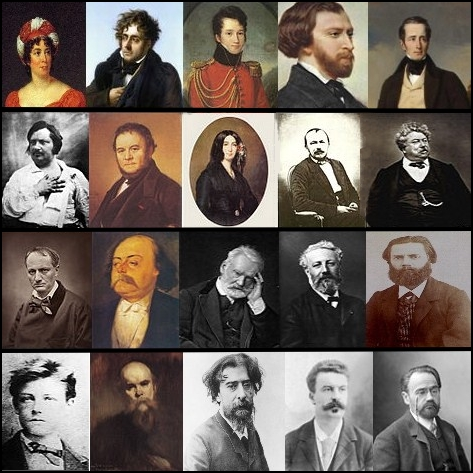
from top to bottom - L to R Germaine de Staël-François-René de Chateaubriand-Alfred de Vigny-Alfred de Musset-Alphonse de Lamartine & Honoré de Balzac-Stendhal-George Sand-Gérard de Nerval-Alexandre Dumas & Charles Baudelaire-Gustave Flaubert-Victor Hugo-Jules Verne-Jules Vallès & Arthur Rimbaud-Paul Verlaine-Alphonse Daudet-Guy de Maupassant-Émile Zola

  - Germaine de Staël – Corinne, or Italy
  - François-René de Chateaubriand – Atala, René
  - Benjamin Constant – Adolphe
  - Stendhal – Le Rouge et le Noir (The Red and the Black), La Chartreuse de Parme (The Charterhouse of Parma)
  - Honoré de Balzac – La Comédie humaine ("The Human Comedy", a novel cycle which includes Père Goriot, Lost Illusions, and Eugénie Grandet)
  - Alexandre Dumas – The Count of Monte Cristo, The Three Musketeers
  - Victor Hugo – Notre-Dame de Paris (The Hunchback of Notre-Dame), Les Misérables
  - Théophile Gautier – Mademoiselle de Maupin
  - Paul Féval, père – Le Bossu (The Hunchback)
  - Gustave Flaubert – Madame Bovary, Salammbô, L'Éducation sentimentale (Sentimental Education)
  - Jules Verne – Vingt mille lieues sous les mers (Twenty Thousand Leagues Under the Seas), Voyage au centre de la Terre (A Journey to the Center of the Earth), Le tour du monde en quatre-vingts jours (Around the World in Eighty Days)
  - Edmond and Jules de Goncourt – Germinie Lacerteux
  - George Sand – La Petite Fadette
  - Joris-Karl Huysmans – "À rebours"
  - Guy de Maupassant – Bel Ami, La Parure (The Necklace), other short stories
  - Émile Zola – Thérèse Raquin, Les Rougon-Macquart (a novel cycle which includes L'Assommoir, Nana and Germinal)
- 20th century
  - André Gide – Les Faux-monnayeurs (The Counterfeiters), L'Immoraliste (The Immoralist)
  - Marcel Proust – À la recherche du temps perdu (In Search of Lost Time)
  - Albert Cohen
  - François Mauriac
  - Louis Aragon
  - Blaise Cendrars
  - Samuel Beckett – Molloy, Malone Dies, The Unnamable, How It Is
  - André Breton – Nadja
  - Gaston Leroux – Le Fantôme de l'Opéra (The Phantom of the Opera)
  - Roger Martin du Gard – Les Thibault (The Thibaults)
  - Louis-Ferdinand Céline – Voyage au bout de la nuit (Journey to the End of the Night)
  - Colette – Gigi
  - Jean Genet – Notre-Dame-des-Fleurs
  - Julien Gracq – Le Rivage des Syrtes (The Opposing Shore)
  - André Malraux – La Condition Humaine (Man's Fate), L'Espoir (Man's Hope)
  - Albert Camus – L'Étranger (The Stranger or The Outsider)
  - Michel Butor – La Modification
  - Marguerite Yourcenar – Mémoires d'Hadrien
  - Alain Robbe-Grillet – Dans le labyrinthe
  - Georges Perec – La vie mode d'emploi
  - Claude Simon – Les Géorgiques (The Georgics)
  - Robert Pinget – Passacaille
  - Jean-Paul Sartre – La Nausée (Nausea), L´Âge de Raison (The Age of Reason)
  - Françoise Sagan – Bonjour Tristesse (Hello Sadness)
  - Antoine de Saint-Exupéry – Le Petit Prince (The Little Prince)
  - Bernard Werber – Les Fourmis (Empire of the Ants)
- 21st century
  - Michel Houellebecq – La carte et le territoire (The Map and the Territory)
  - Pierre Lemaitre – The Great Swindle
  - Léonora Miano – La Saison de l'ombre
  - Kamel Daoud – Meursault, contre-enquête (The Meursault Investigation)

=== Poetry ===
- Middle Ages
  - William IX (1071–1127)
  - Jaufre Rudel (1113–70)
  - Bernart de Ventadorn (1130–90)
  - Bertran de Born (1140–1215)
  - Marie de France (fl. 1160–1210)
  - Rutebeuf (1245–85)
  - Jean Froissart (1337–1405)
  - François Villon (1431–63) – Le Testament
- La Pléiade
  - Clément Marot (1496–1544)
  - Maurice Scève (1505–1569)
  - Joachim du Bellay (1522–60)
  - Pontus de Tyard (1521–1605)
  - Louise Labé (1524–1566)
  - Pierre de Ronsard (1524–85)
- Baroque
  - Agrippa d'Aubigné (1552–1630) – Les Tragiques
  - Théophile de Viau (1590–1626)
- Classicism
  - François de Malherbe (1555–1628)
  - Jean de La Fontaine (1621–95) – The Fables
  - Nicolas Boileau (1636–1711)
- Romanticism
  - André Chénier (1762–1794)
  - Alphonse de Lamartine (1790–1869) – Méditations poétiques
  - Alfred de Vigny (1797–1863)
  - Victor Hugo (1802–85) – Les Contemplations
  - Gérard de Nerval (1808–55) – The Chimeras
  - Alfred de Musset (1810–57)
  - Charles Baudelaire (1821–67) – Les Fleurs du mal
- Parnassianism
  - Théophile Gautier (1811–72)
  - Leconte de Lisle (1818–94)
  - Théodore de Banville (1823–91)
- Symbolism and Decadence
  - Villiers de L'Isle-Adam (1838–89)
  - Stéphane Mallarmé (1842–98)
  - Paul Verlaine (1844–96)
  - Comte de Lautréamont (1846–70)
  - Arthur Rimbaud (1854–91) – Une Saison en Enfer
  - Paul Valéry (1871–1945)
  - Paul Fort (1872–1960)
- Modernism
  - Charles Péguy (1873–1914)
  - Guillaume Apollinaire (1880–1918) – Alcools
  - Blaise Cendrars (1887–1961)
  - Saint-John Perse (1887–1975) – Vents
- Dada and Surrealism
  - Paul Éluard (1895–1952)
  - Tristan Tzara (1896–1963)
  - André Breton (1896–1966)
  - Louis Aragon (1897–1982)
  - Henri Michaux (1899–1984)
  - Robert Desnos (1900–45)
  - René Char (1907–88)
- Postmodernism
  - Jules Supervielle (1884–1960)
  - Jean Cocteau (1889–1963)
  - Francis Ponge (1899–1988) – Le Parti Pris des Choses
  - Jacques Prévert (1900–77)
  - Raymond Queneau (1903–76)
- Négritude
  - Léopold Sédar Senghor (1906–2001)
  - Birago Diop (1906–89)
  - Aimé Césaire (1913–2008)

=== Theatre ===
- Adam de la Halle – Le Jeu de Robin et de Marion
- Anonymous - La Farce de maître Pathelin (ca. 1456–1460)
- Pierre Corneille (1606–84)- Le Cid (1636), Horace
- Molière – Tartuffe, Le Misanthrope, Dom Juan, L'Avare (The Miser), Le Bourgeois Gentilhomme, L'École des femmes (The School for Wives), Le Malade imaginaire (The Imaginary Invalid)
- Jean Racine – Phèdre, Andromaque, Bérénice, Athalie
- Marivaux – Jeu de l'amour et du hasard
- Beaumarchais – Le Barbier de Séville (The Barber of Seville), La Folle journée, ou Le Mariage de Figaro (The Marriage of Figaro)
- Alfred Jarry – King Ubu
- Edmond Rostand – Cyrano de Bergerac
- Jean Giraudoux – The Trojan War Will Not Take Place
- Jean Anouilh – Becket, Antigone
- Jean-Paul Sartre – No Exit
- Eugène Ionesco – La Cantatrice chauve' (The Bald Soprano), Les Chaises (The Chairs), La Leçon (The Lesson), Rhinoceros
- Jean Genet – The Maids, The Balcony
- Samuel Beckett – En attendant Godot (Waiting for Godot), Fin de Partie (Endgame) and other works in French

=== Nonfiction ===
- Jean Froissart – Chronicles
- Philippe de Commines – Memoirs
- Étienne de La Boétie - Discourse on Voluntary Servitude
- Michel de Montaigne – The Essays
- Blaise Pascal – Les Pensées
- René Descartes – Meditations on First Philosophy, Discourse on Method
- François de La Rochefoucauld – The Maxims
- Jean de la Bruyère – Les Caractères ou les Mœurs de ce siècle
- Louis de Rouvroy, duc de Saint-Simon – Memoirs
- Jean-Jacques Rousseau – Discourse on the Arts and Sciences, The Social Contract, Les Confessions (Confessions)
- François-René de Chateaubriand – Genius of Christianity, Memoirs from Beyond Grave
- Alexis de Tocqueville – Democracy in America
- Frédéric Bastiat – The Law
- Jules Michelet – Histoire de France, La Sorcière
- Henri Bergson – Creative Evolution
- Albert Camus – The Myth of Sisyphus
- Jean-Paul Sartre – Existentialism is a Humanism, Being and Nothingness
- Simone de Beauvoir – The Second Sex
- Claude Lévi-Strauss – Tristes Tropiques
- Emil Cioran – A Short History of Decay, The Trouble with Being Born and other works in French
- Paul Ricœur – Freedom and Nature. The Voluntary and the Involuntary
- Michel Foucault – Discipline and Punish, The History of Sexuality
- Pierre Bourdieu – La Distinction
- Gilles Deleuze - Difference and Repetition

== Literary criticism ==
- Nicolas Boileau
- Charles-Augustin Sainte-Beuve
- Hippolyte Taine
- Jacques Lacan
- Maurice Blanchot
- Paul Bénichou
- Roland Barthes
- Jean Ricardou
- Paul Ricœur
- Michel Foucault
- Jean-François Lyotard
- Jacques Derrida
- Julia Kristeva

== Poetry ==
- Parnassianism
- Romanticism
- Symbolism (arts)

== See also ==
- Culture of France
- French art
- List of French-language authors
- List of French-language poets
- French science fiction
- Fantastique
- List of libraries in France
- Mass media in France
  - Books in France
- Stereotypes of Jews in French literature
