= Jean Ricardou =

French writer (1932–2016)

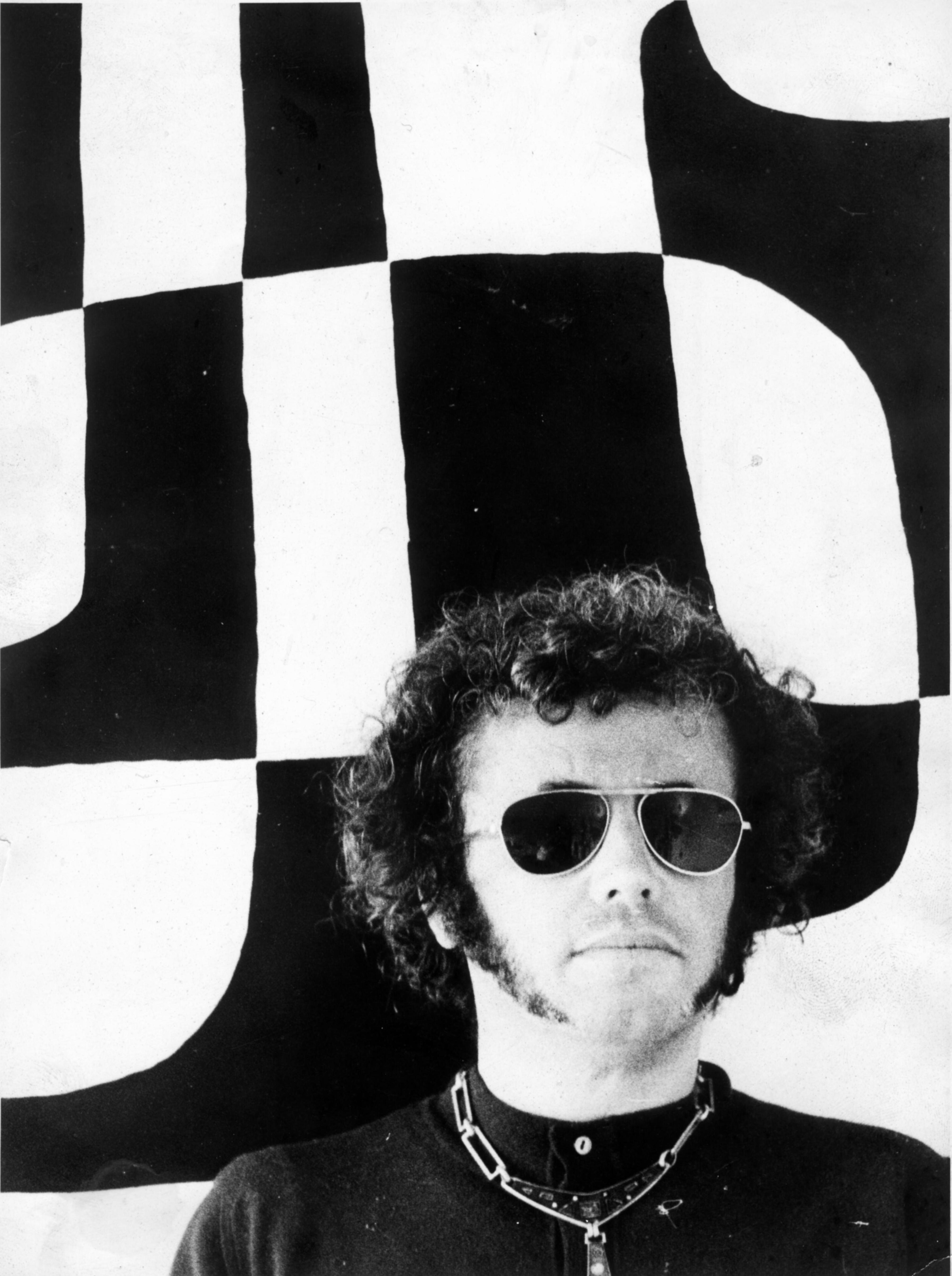
- Jean Ricardou and his emblematic painting
- Born: June 17, 1932; Cannes, France
- Died: July 23, 2016 (aged 84); Cannes, France
- Occupations: Writer, novelist and literary theorist
- Notable work: L'Observatoire de Cannes (1961); La prise de Constantinople (1965); Problèmes du Nouveau Roman (1967); Les lieux-dits (1969); Révolutions minuscules (1971); Pour une théorie du Nouveau Roman (1973); Le Nouveau Roman (1973); Nouveaux problèmes du roman (1978); Le théâtre des métamorphoses (1982); La cathédrale de sens (1988); Une maladie chronique (1989); Intelligibilité structurale du trait (2012); Grivèlerie (2012); Intellection textique (2017); Intelligibilité structurale de la page (2018); Salut aux quatre coins (2019)
- Website: https://jeanricardou.org

Jean Ricardou (17 June 1932, Cannes — 23 July 2016, Cannes) was a French writer and theorist. He joined the Tel Quel editorial board in 1962, writing for the review until 1971. Between 1961 and 1984 he published three novels, a collection of short stories, four books of critical theory and a "mix" of fiction and theory, whilst being the main theorist of the French New Novel literary movement before devoting his work, as of 1985, almost exclusively to the invention and development of a new science of writing: textics.

Jean Ricardou's complete works (L'Intégrale) are posthumously published by the Belgian publisher Les Impressions nouvelles.

== From teaching to writing ==
Ricardou always took a radical stand against a biographical approach to writing. As he states in a short biographic note at the beginning of the “Postface” to his radio play, “Communications”, in Le Théâtre des Métamorphoses:

It must be said: however accurate, however factual such details might be, and despite their compliance with accepted autobiographical practice, they offer the reader strictly nothing of interest.

After graduating from the Paris École Normale d'Instituteurs (teachers' college) in 1953, he taught reading and writing in a boys' primary school until 1961, then at a boys' high school in Paris where he also taught literature, history, science, and geography until 1977, and finally as visiting professor where he gave courses and conferences on his theory of the French New Novel in universities worldwide. However, as his teaching left him little time for his own writing, he resigned from the French school system in 1977 and only still accepted the occasional conference. In 1973 he obtained a degree in Modern Literature at the University of Paris VIII (Vincennes), then in 1975 a “Doctorat de 3^{e} cycle, Littérature française”, and in 1982 a “Doctorat d'État ès-lettres et sciences humaines” (Toulouse-Le Mirail). From 1980 to 2016, he assumed part-time work for the International Cultural Center at Cerisy-la-Salle (France) as programs and publications advisor.

Although he was already writing in primary school, his literary career began in 1955 when, intrigued by an unfavorable review judging Alain Robbe-Grillet's novel Le Voyeur incomprehensible, he decided to model his own writing on what was then just beginning to be known as the “Nouveau Roman”. His first novel L'Observatoire de Cannes was published in 1961 by Editions de Minuit. In 1966, his second novel, La Prise de Constantinople (Minuit, 1965), was awarded the Feneon prize for literature.

Ricardou published his first book of critical theory, Problèmes du Nouveau Roman (1967), in the “Tel Quel” collection (Le Seuil, Paris). He co-directed the first major conference devoted to the French New Novel at Cerisy, attended by the main new novelists, and then directed the conferences and debates on Claude Simon (1974) and on Robbe-Grillet (1975), with the participation of the two writers.

In 1985, whilst teaching a seminar at the International College of Philosophy (Paris), he devised a new theory of writing: la textique (textics). From 1989 until 2015, he conducted an annual seminar on the subject at Cerisy.

His writing is characterized by his meticulous and often poetic style, and by his determination to provide a coherent articulation between three activities usually kept separate: “practice” (fiction writing), theory (of writing and the operations involved in writing) and education (as a schoolteacher and subsequently as visiting university professor).

== Fiction ==
The importance of Ricardou's theoretical works tends to distract attention from his fiction (novels and short stories). Nevertheless, a statement he made many times throughout his lifetime should be emphasized: the reason he devised his theory was to understand the fiction which came, partially beyond his conscious determination, from the act of writing itself. In his case, writing involved certain principles of generation and selection that he developed and amplified (and renamed) throughout the years, and his theoretical work was mainly based on his experiments in fiction writing, i.e. discovering what could be generated by the deliberate integration of certain formal procedures and constraints. Such supplementary structures, far from stifling inventiveness, actually provide stimulation to go far beyond that which, without these formal rules and principles, he might initially have imagined. The following quotation, from Révélations minuscules, says as much (and more). Instead of an approximate and inadequate translation, one might propose as a paraphrase a sentence from Ricardou's 1971 conference at Cerisy, “Birth of a Fiction”: “The generative operations of similitude and of selection by overdetermination, far from restricting a supposed creative aptitude, are in fact the machinery whereby an entire production of elements and relations becomes possible”:

Ce que personne, de nos jours, ne devrait méconnaître, (...), c'est avec quelle force les directives d'écriture, funambulesques maintes fois quelques-unes il est vrai, loin d'interdire, ainsi que les naïfs le croient, les mouvements de la pensée, lors confondue sans doute avec le vague à l'âme, savent offrir à l'invention, au contraire, et parce qu'elles lui posent, tout simplement, de très exacts problèmes, les meilleures des chances. (...). Mieux: telles supplémentaires structures, non seulement elles permettent d'obtenir, et beaucoup plus qu'on ne l'avoue, ce que fors elles on n'eût jamais conçu (et c'est pourquoi mieux vaut, que n'a-t-il susurré (si un temps suffisant, du moins, m'est consenti, je le ferai paraître un soir pour Mallarmé), de préférence à tout pyramidal recensement d'un univers imaginaire, fournir la stricte analyse des matérielles relations par lesquelles un poète imagine), mais encore, tel est le dos caché du mécanisme (...), elles conduisent quelquefois à produire des idées strictement étrangères, peut-être, à ce qu'on se figure avoir émis.

His earliest writing, both prose and poetry (now archived at the IMEC] Institute for the Memory of Contemporary Writing, Abbaye d’Ardenne, France), confirms, if not the predominance, at least the precedence of his fiction over theory. Some of these early writings, surrealist in style, were published in 1956 in L’Herne, a mimeographed avant-garde review edited by Dominique de Roux. However, impressed as he was in 1955 by Alain Robbe-Grillet's novel Le Voyeur, then by Michel Butor’s L’emploi du temps or Claude Simon’s Le Vent:

Ricardou soon adopted and considerably adapted the model of the early “Nouveau Roman”, with its non-realist, “creative” use of description, the interest of which, Ricardou put it, in a much-cited formula, lay less in “l’écriture d’une aventure” than in “l'aventure d’une écriture”. It was a technique, with voyeuristic male fantasies to boot, that Ricardou quickly made his own, and one he develops, with more rigor and ingenuity than ever apparent in his mentor, in his first novel, L’Observatoire de Cannes (Minuit, 1961). The inverse relationship between writing and referentiality thus laid bare (not for nothing did he call literary “description” a kind of “strip-tease”) soon became one of the hallmarks of his writing. Traditional plot and character, conspicuous by their absence, were replaced by an intricate quasi-musical web of textual and intertextual variations on selected motifs.

=== La Prise de Constantinople ===
The many favorable reviews of L’Observatoire de Cannes encouraged Ricardou to compose a second, much more ambitious novel, La Prise de Constantinople, which was awarded the Fénéon prize for literature in 1966.

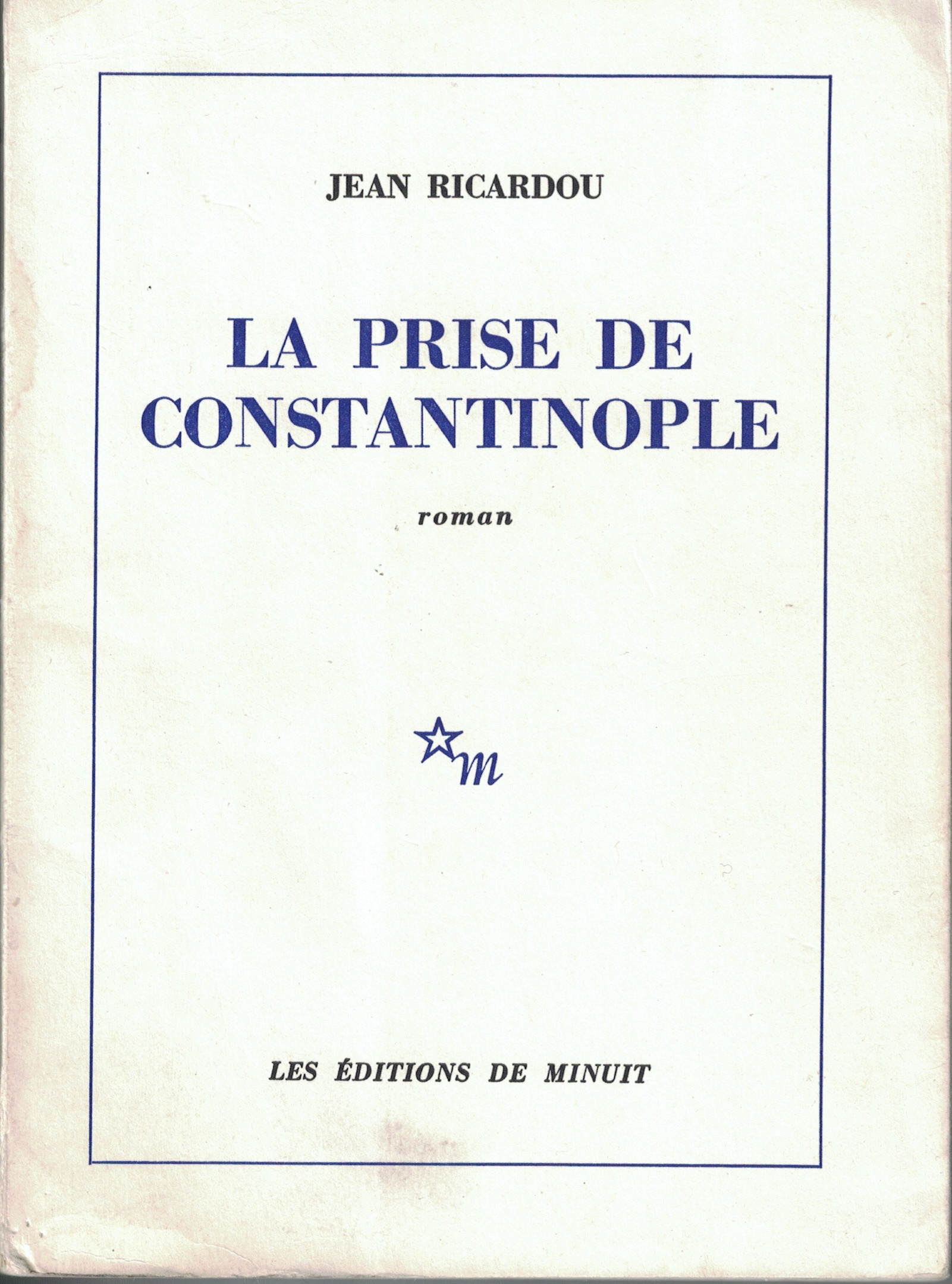
Front cover (Minuit, 1965)

The book was an innovation even for the New Novel movement. To start with, the titles on the front and back cover were not the same (La prise/La prose de Constantinople), inaugurating the wordplay that would characterize the entire novel, whose pages and chapters were unnumbered. Then, assuming Flaubert's project of “writing a book about nothing”, it began literally, as did the poem “Salut” (“Rien, cette écume, vierge vers”) that inaugurated Mallarmé's collected Poésies, with the word “rien”. As he explained:

Nothing, one day, seemed more imperative to me than the project whose fiction would be constructed not as the representation of some preexistent entity, real or imaginary, but rather on the basis of certain specific mechanisms of generation and selection. The principle of selection may be called overdetermination. It requires that every element in the text have at least two justifications. (...) Elsewhere I gave the name generator of elements for a fiction to the couple formed by a base and an operation. The operations are numerous; I do not propose to list them here. (...) As for the base, it may be either a single word or a group of words. Since the book is supposed to be constructed without the establishment of any preexistent entity, what generative base can be chosen? It goes without saying that nothing is suitable, and that the book must be built upon nothing.

Called by Lynn Higgins a superbook which “not only exploits its points of departure (puzzles, material givens of the cover design, generative wordplay), but also explores the enigmas of its own evolution and takes responsibility for meanings produced”, La Prise de Constantinople led the way toward a new kind of composition: the polydiegetic novel, i.e. “a text that combines different “stories” taking place in what are a priori incompatible space-time worlds.

It also devised and endlessly refined a procedure that fascinated Ricardou all his life, from when, at 5, in his first year at school, the teacher had the class sing canons, and the staggered repetition was a revelation, as he later said:

À 5 ans, à l'école maternelle, on nous a fait chanter des canons, et j'ai tout compris. Tout. Frère Jacques, décalé, la répétition avec une constante d'irrégularité: le récit, c'est ça.

His emblematic painting, done around 1960, which hung over his writing desk for the rest of his life and may be seen in many of the photos of him taken to illustrate articles in the press (see “Infobox” above), was a depiction of this process which he described as “a procedure of duplication (or “rule of repetition”) integrating a constant of irregularity”. One finds, in La Prise de Constantinople, many examples of its application to literature, such as:

Les fortifications proposent une matière bleuâtre, polie, lucide, distribuée en surfaces entrecroisées que gauchissent, multiplient et décalent divers effets de réflexions réciproques. À chaque déplacement de l’œil, des arêtes, des rentrants imprévus, à chaque déplacement de l’œil, des arêtes, des rentrants imprévus, des perspectives paradoxales se déclarent à chaque déplacement de l’œil, des arêtes, des rentrants imprévus, des perspectives paradoxales se déclarent selon un ordre incomplet qui pénètre l’esprit, à chaque déplacement de l’œil, des arêtes, des rentrants imprévus, des perspectives paradoxales se déclarent selon un ordre incomplet qui pénètre l’esprit et y accrédite l’idée qu’il existe un point de cet espace d’où il est possible de percevoir simultanément la convergence des rythmes de toute la configuration et d’en pénétrer les arcanes en tous sens à chaque déplacement de l’œil.

Translation:

The fortifications propose a steel-blue surface, polished, translucent, distributed in intersecting planes that are warped, compounded and disjoined by the effects of their reciprocal reflections. With each shift in focus, sharp edges, acute angles, with each shift in focus, sharp edges, acute angles, paradoxical perspectives appear in an incomplete pattern that pervades the mind, with each shift in focus, sharp edges, acute angles, paradoxical perspectives appear in an incomplete pattern that pervades the mind and accredits the idea that there exists some point in that space from which it is possible simultaneously to perceive the convergence of rhythms of the whole configuration and to penetrate its arcana in every sense with each shift in focus.

As Leslie Hill summarized the novel in his review of the first four volumes of L'Intégrale Jean Ricardou:

Taking literally Flaubert’s remark about wanting to write “un livre sur rien”, Ricardou undertook to generate an entire novel if not from “nothing”, then at least from nothing other than its material instantiation. His own name, consisting of 4 + 8 letters, generated a series of mathematical ratios used in the construction of the narrative, as did its convergence with that of Geoffroi de Villehardouin, the chronicler of the Fourth Crusade which, as Villehardouin “wrote”, “took” Constantinople in 1204. The name and star emblem of Editions de Minuit contributed further textual pathways, as well as the names Ed, Ed. Word, or Edith. Other mechanisms were devised too, resulting in a constructivist labyrinth of literally Byzantine complexity. Such fictions were not just fascinating objects of reading, they were abyssal reflections on themselves, and the nothing of which they came.

=== Les Lieux-dits & Révolutions minuscules ===
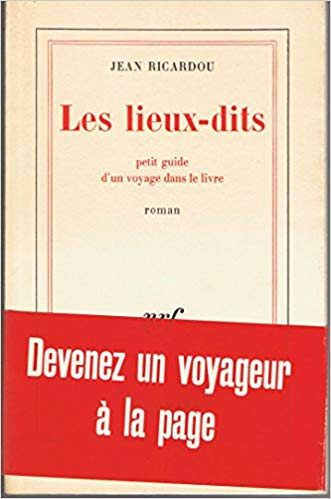
Front cover (Gallimard, 1969)

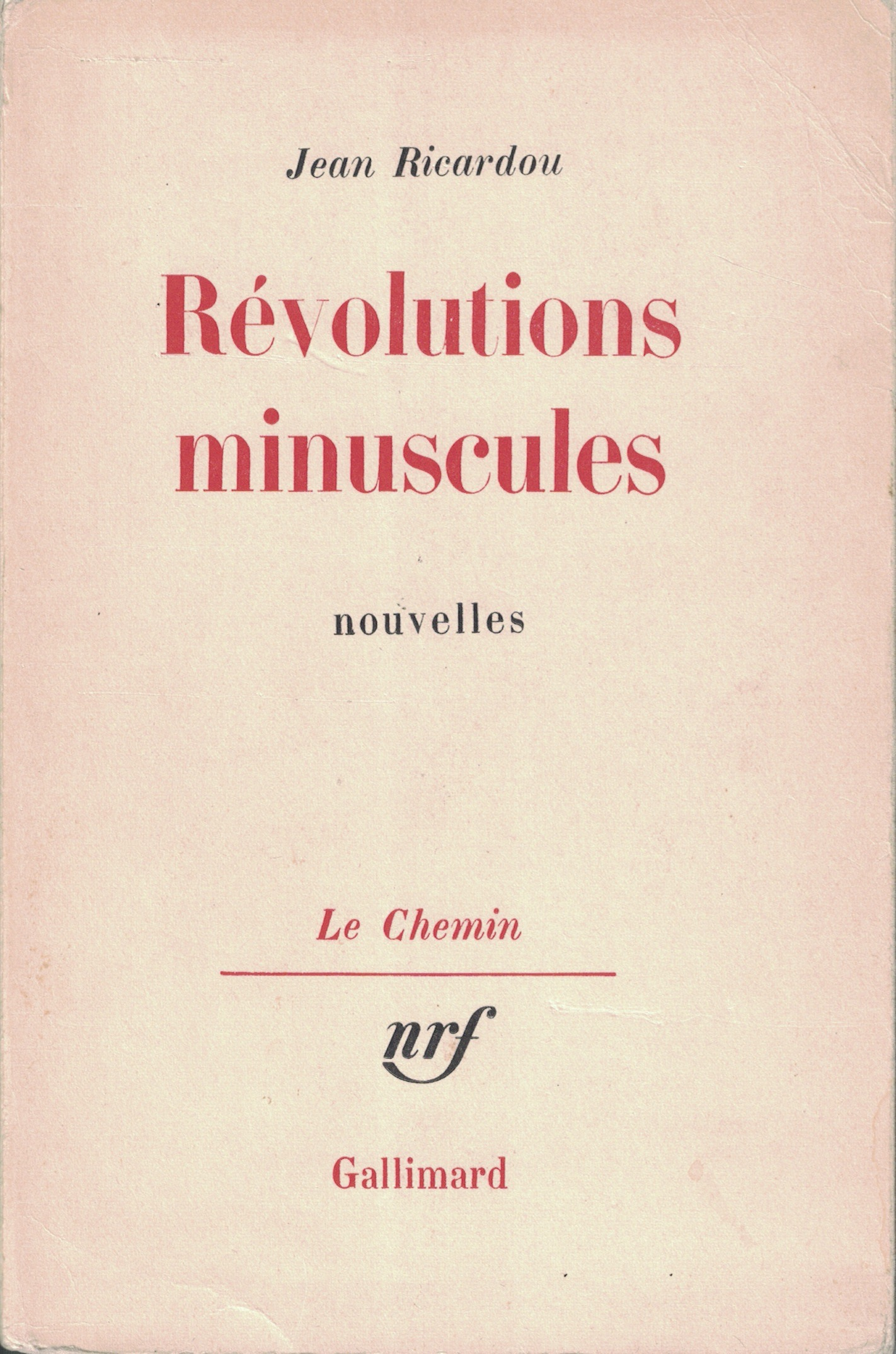
Front cover (Gallimard, 1971)

While continuing to work on his novels, Jean Ricardou regularly published shorter pieces, essays and fictions, in various literary reviews, including the NRF (Nouvelle Revue Française), Critique, and Tel Quel, where he became a member of the editorial board in 1962. In 1971, he put together a collection of these stories, all written using procedures invented by the New Novel, in a book ironically named Révolutions minuscules. It was published by Gallimard, as was his best known novel, Les lieux-dits, petit guide d’un voyage dans le livre, two years previously. Of the latter, Lynn Higgins wrote:

Les Lieux-dits has a plot, and this distinguishes it from [his] other novels, all of which have either several conflicting plots or no story at all. The story is an outrageously improbable quest, however, whose vicissitudes are determined by word-play, by permutation of letters and of geometric shapes, and by the exigencies of its theoretical and didactic purposes. Germaine Brée calls this novel “a beautiful piece of work, impeccably constructed, a cross between a poem, a surrealistic dream and a critical meditation on the relation of language to reality.”

=== Le Théâtre des métamorphoses ===
Ricardou's ninth book, Le Théâtre des Métamorphoses, was published in 1982 by Le Seuil in the collection “Fiction & Cie”. It came after four books of theory and four books of fiction. After 8 previous volumes in two groups of 4, this ninth book was to receive a different name: a “mix”. The explanation of this neologism is given on the book's back cover: it is a work of fiction and a work of theory at the same time, with poems and illustrations, parallels and rhymes, all interwoven in an assortment of registers, a sort of “Fiction & Cie”. It is not a "mixture" (a simple collection of disparate items), it is a “mix” (a precise texture of diverse components). As always, Ricardou's intention is to awaken the somnolent reader by a narrative continuously switching directions. As always, his goal is to teach the reader something, to provide a new text education.

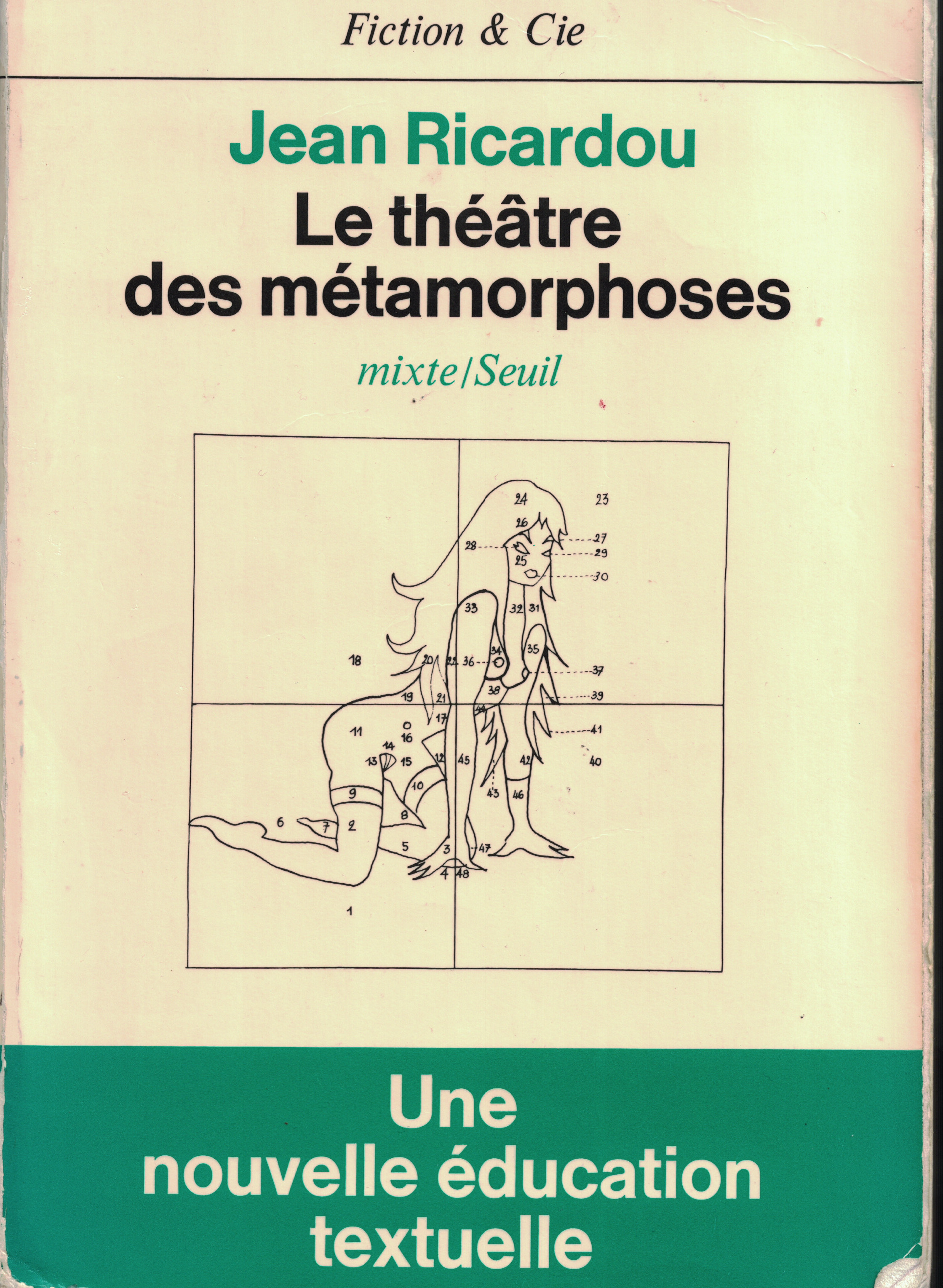
Front cover (Seuil, 1982)

The combination of fiction (here with all its poetic and graphic adjuncts) and theory, although both types of writing are well known and easily identifiable, may seem disconcerting, but it is however understandable.

What may seem disconcerting is not that one book combines two distinct types of writing, but rather that it combines two types of writing generally held to be incompatible. These two types of writing, fiction and theory, are usually considered to belong to two antagonistic or, at least, mutually exclusive systems. According to the cultural ideology prevailing at least until the end of the 20th century, with this “division of work” the two disciplines were separate, one excluding the other:

Apparently today it seems that one has a choice only between two incomplete attitudes: either the “naive” (the artist, let's say, who “creates” without much thought [...] or the “sterile” (the professor, let's say, who thinks a lot without much “creation” [...]).

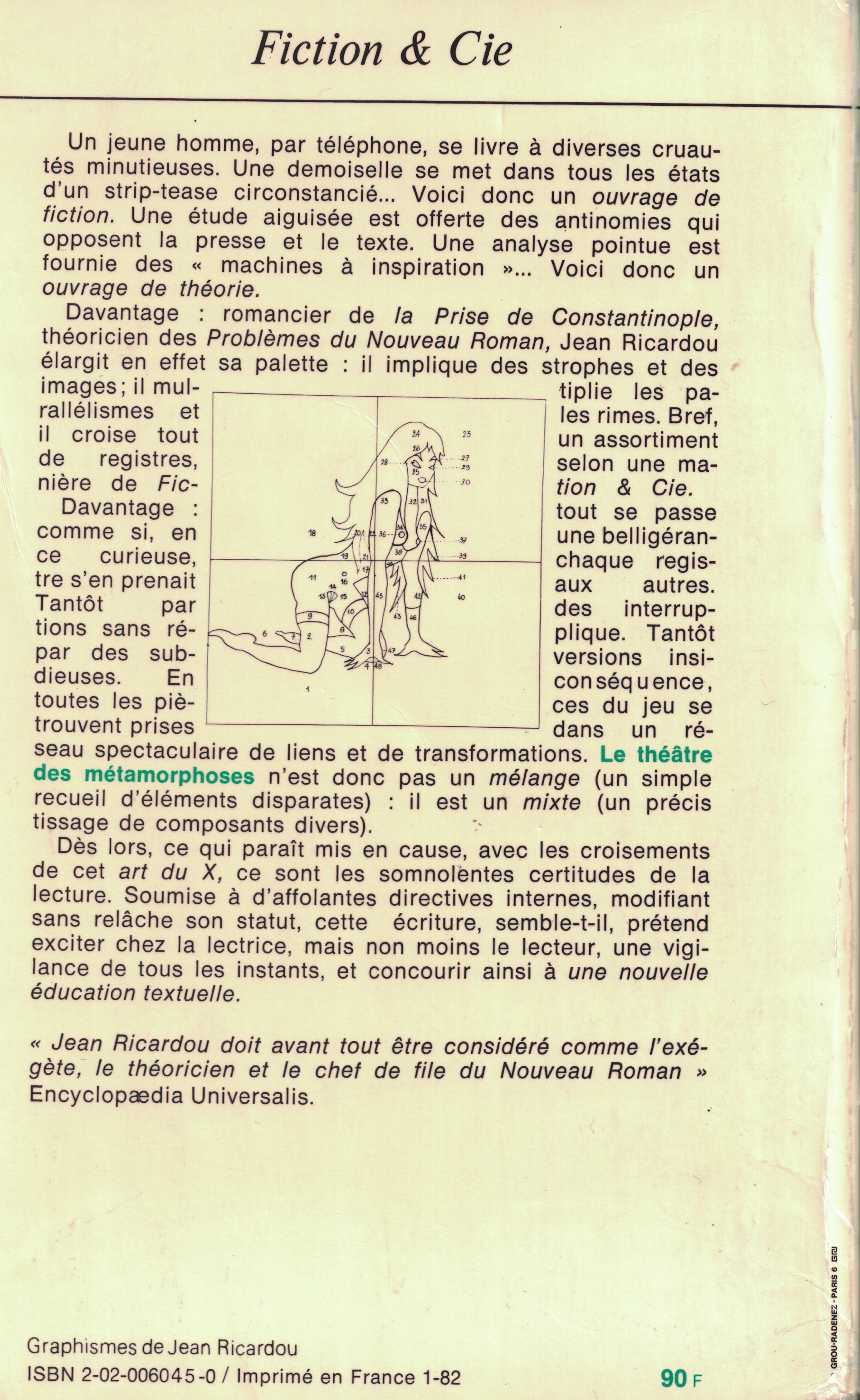
Back cover

The combination is nevertheless understandable. On the one hand, the “mix” is an attempt to overcome the “dominant model” that tends to separate art from theory. On the other hand, it is a direct consequence of the method characterizing the author of La Prise de Constantinople (1965) and of Problèmes du Nouveau Roman (1967), i.e. a systematic alternation between works of fiction and works of theory (and also a determination to do things in groups of 4 or 8). Thus his ninth book could only take on both practices together and combine the two:

These two separate activities are both found in my work, but only partly, so to speak, since they are found in separate books: novels or essays. With Le Théâtre des Métamorphoses, they are combined in one and the same book. And I do say “combined”, not “assembled”. Because this book is not a “mixture” (a mish-mash), it's a “mix” (a calculated disparity). In other words, it's a book divided: a fiction, attempting to cast its spells (by means of suspense and strip-teases), and a reflection on the processes employed (by means of analyses and concepts).

The book's radical innovation, which probably pushed writing to its limits, seemed to preclude a return to the previous simple alternation between fiction and theory.

The Théâtre des Métamorphoses was to be followed, in 1988, by two collections of stories, published by Les Impressions Nouvelles] La Cathédrale de Sens and a new edition of Révolutions minuscules with the addition of a long “preface”. Although both books contain fictions rewritten for the occasion, they also include five new pieces that prolong the logic of the “mix”. Thus La Cathédrale de Sens includes the piece called “Le Lapsus Circulaire”, an 80-page previously unpublished narrative with which the book begins and which is echoed, at the end of the volume, by “L'art du X”, previously published in a little-known review in 1983, as well as two completely new stories, “Superchérie” and “Résipiscence”. The other collection, a new edition of Révolutions minuscules, includes an extremely complex and technically sophisticated piece with the title “Révélations minuscules, en guise de préface, à la gloire de Jean Pauhan”, a 99-page narrative which opens with a long, meticulously written prose-poem about the game of bocce (pétanque) and develops from there, through all sorts of inextricably interwoven formal procedures and constraints, into something dizzyingly more complex, supposedly written by Ricardou's supposed twin sister, thus qualified to speak for him, ending up with what might be construed as a meditation on the meaning of life, love, writing and dying.

== Theory ==
The nouveau roman literary movement and its novels were mainly theorized by Jean Ricardou who, in addition to his well-known theoretical works — Problèmes du Nouveau roman (1967), Pour une théorie du Nouveau roman (1971), Le Nouveau roman (1973), Nouveaux Problèmes du roman (1978) — also published several nouveaux romans himself: L’Observatoire de Cannes (1961), La Prise de Constantinople (1965, Feneon prize for literature in 1966), Les Lieux-dits, petit guide d’un voyage dans le livre (1969). Besides his own writing, he organized, directed and published the acts of several conferences on the nouveau roman, including the famous 1971 conference and debate at Cerisy, published in two volumes: Nouveau roman : hier, aujourd’hui, indispensable for an understanding of the history of that important period of French literature. Just before his demise in 2016, he was working on a book of interviews with Amir Biglari, in which he provides a complete, precise and objective account of the nouveau roman movement.Ricardou's first book of critical theory, Problèmes du Nouveau Roman (1967), bears a title exemplifying his way of thinking: he discerns a problem where no one else notices anything, and then proceeds to discover, within the text itself, the solution that nobody else seems ever to have noticed either.

As Patrick Quinn put it:

Every move [Ricardou] makes has reference to specific details within the story. There is no overt or covert imposition of meaning, but rather a process of eliciting meaning from the particular details that [its author] used. What is astonishing is that Ricardou can fasten on what seem the most trivial of details and show, or at least put on a brilliant demonstration of showing, how these details are not inert but rather have an active function within the story as a whole.

In Problèmes du Nouveau Roman, rather than examining the usual overt or covert imposition of some realistic or psychological meaning and/or its supposed relation to the biography of the author, Ricardou devotes his analyses to the problems of description, metaphor and writing itself, as they are implemented in the production and organisation of the French New Novel, which he famously defines as no longer the narration of an adventure, but rather the adventure of a narration: "Non plus le récit d'une aventure, mais l'aventure du récit". Essays in Problèmes provide insight not only into New Novels by Michel Butor, Claude Ollier, Alain Robbe-Grillet, Claude Simon and Philippe Sollers, but also classics such as Œdipus Rex, The Fall of the House of Usher and The Gold Bug by E.A. Poe, La Recherche du Temps Perdu by Marcel Poust, as well as Borges and Novalis. His attentive examination of the texts themselves enables him to discover the dialectical relationship between fiction and narration, fiction not so much producing the narration as produced by it, and, in a sort of reverse role, ending up by challenging itself.

In his second volume of literary theory, Pour une Théorie du Nouveau Roman, Ricardou continues to develop his theory of the New Novel and applies it as well to classics by Flaubert, Proust, Poe, Valery, and Roussel, developing original theoretical concepts which will continue to evolve throughout his work.

His third book of theory, Le Nouveau Roman, now a classic, was ordered by the publisher Le Seuil as a textbook on the New Novel. In 1990 a new edition included excerpts from interviews with the new novelists themselves, a preface and an additional essay, born of an argument with Alain Robbe-Grillet, which goes on to describe the origin and evolution of the movement and then to examine the issues involved in literary movements in general.

His fourth book of theory, Nouveaux Problèmes du Roman, may be characterized by this quotation from Jean Paulhan:

Some solutions are stranger than the problems they were meant to solve, for the problem was only ONE question whereas its solution poses many more.

== Bibliography ==
=== Complete works (in French): posthumous edition ===
- Intégrale Jean Ricardou tome 1: L'Observatoire de Cannes et autres écrits (1956-1961)
- Intégrale Jean Ricardou tome 2: La prise de Constantinople et autres écrits (1962-1966)
- Intégrale Jean Ricardou tome 3: Problèmes du Nouveau Roman et autres écrits (1967-1968)
- Intégrale Jean Ricardou tome 4: Les lieux-dits et autres écrits (1969-1970)
- Intégrale Jean Ricardou tome 5: Révolutions minuscules et Pour une théorie du NR et autres écrits (1971)
- Intégrale Jean Ricardou tome 6: Le Nouveau Roman et autres écrits (1972-1973)
- Intégrale Jean Ricardou tome 7: La révolution textuelle et autres écrits (1974-1977)

=== Works of fiction (novels and short stories) ===
- Novel: L'Observatoire de Cannes (Minuit, 1961); L'Intégrale Jean Ricardou tome 1 (1956–1961), Les Impressions nouvelles, Bruxelles, 2017
- Novel: La prise de Constantinople (Minuit, 1965); L'Intégrale Jean Ricardou tome 2 (1962–1966), Les Impressions nouvelles, Bruxelles, 2017
- Novel: Les lieux-dits, petit guide d'un voyage dans le livre (Gallimard, Le Chemin, 1969; UGE, 10/18, 1972); L'Intégrale Jean Ricardou tome 4 (1969–1970), Les Impressions nouvelles, Bruxelles, 2018.
- Short Stories: Révolutions minuscules (Gallimard, Le Chemin, 1971; rewritten and expanded version including Révélations minuscules, en guise de préface, à la gloire de Jean Paulhan (Les Impressions nouvelles, 1988); L'Intégrale Jean Ricardou tome 5 (1971), Les Impressions nouvelles, Bruxelles, 2019.
- Short Stories: La cathédrale de Sens (Les Impressions nouvelles, 1988)

=== Fiction (in English) ===
- “Epitaphe”, transl. Erica Freiberg, Chicago Review, vol. 27, no. 3, 1975, pp. 4–8
- Place Names: A Brief Guide to Travels in the Book [Les lieux-dits, petit guide d'un voyage dans le livre] translated by Jordan Stump (Dalkey Archive Press, 2007)

=== Critical theory (books) ===
- Problèmes du Nouveau Roman, Paris, Seuil, Tel Quel, 1967; L'Intégrale Jean Ricardou, vol. 3 (1967-1968), Bruxelles, Les Impressions nouvelles, 2018
- Pour une théorie du Nouveau Roman, Paris, Seuil, Tel Quel, 1971; L'Intégrale Jean Ricardou vol. 5 (1971), Bruxelles, Les Impressions nouvelles, 2019
- Le Nouveau Roman, Seuil, collection “Ecrivains de toujours”, 1973; rewritten and expanded version including a new preface and essay “Les raisons de l'ensemble”, Seuil, collection “Points”, 1990; L'Intégrale Jean Ricardou vol. 6 (1972-1973), Bruxelles, Les Impressions nouvelles, 2020
- Nouveaux problèmes du Roman, Paris, Seuil, collection Poétique, 1978 (Intégrale Jean Ricardou vol. 8, to be published in 2022 by Les Impressions nouvelles)
- Une maladie chronique, Bruxelles, Les Impressions nouvelles, 1989
- Un aventurier de l'écriture, interviews with Amir Biglari, Éditions academia be, 2018

=== Critical theory (in English) ===
- “Rethinking Literature Today”, transl. Carol Rigolot, SubStance, vol. 2/4 (Autumn 1972): 65–72.
- “Composition Discomposed”, transl. Erica Freiberg, Critical Inquiry, vol. 3/1 (Autumn 1976): 79–91.
- “Gold in the Bug”, Poe Studies, transl. Frank Towne, vol. IX, n. 1 (1976): 33–39.
- “The Singular Character of the Water”, Poe Studies, transl. Frank Towne, vol. IX, n. 1 (1976): 1–6
- “Birth of a Fiction”, transl. Erica Freiberg, Critical Inquiry, vol. 4/2 (Winter 1977): 221–230.
- “The Populations of Mirrors: Problems of Similarity on a Text by Alain Robbe-Grillet”, transl. Phoebe Cohen, The MIT Press, vol. 102 (Spring 1977): 35–67.On line
- “Time of Narration, Time of Fiction”, transl. Joseph Kestner, James Joyce Quarterly, vol. 16 (1978): 7–15.
- “The Story within the Story”, transl. Joseph Kestner, James Joyce Quarterly, vol. 18 (1981): 323–38.
- “Nouveau roman, Tel quel”, trans. Erica Freiberg, in Federman, Raymond (ed.), Surfiction: Fiction Now … and Tomorrow, Chicago: Swallow, 1981: 101–133.
- “Writing between the Lines”, Ibid.: 263–277.
- “Proust: A Retrospective Reading”, transl. Erica Freiberg, Critical Inquiry, vol. 8 (1982): 531–41.
- “Elocutory Disappearance” [“Disparition élocutoire”, transl. Alec Gordon, Atlas Anthology 4, Londres, Atlas Press, 1987.
- “Immersing the Narrative Text in the Text”, transl. Alan Varley, Jacqueline Berben, Graham Dallas, Style, vol. 26/3 (Fall 1992): 457-90 Link
- “Text Generation” ("Nouveau Roman, Tel Quel", transl. Erica Freiberg), Narrative Dynamics, Essays on Time, Plot, Closure, and Frames, (repr. Surfiction, 2nd ed., ed, Raymond Federman, 1981), ed. Brian Richardson, The Ohio State U.P. (2002): 179–90

=== Mix (of theory, fiction, poetry, etc.) ===
- Le Théâtre des métamorphoses (Seuil, Fiction et Cie, 1982)
- Appreciation, First section of Le Théâtre des métamorphoses, transl. Jerry Mirskin and Michel Sirvent, Studies in 20th-century Literature, vol. 15/2, Summer 1991: 267–76.

=== Textics ===
- Intelligibilité structurale du trait (Les Impressions nouvelles, cahiers de textique, 2012)
- Grivèlerie (Les Impressions nouvelles, cahiers de textique, 2012)
- Intellection textique partagée (Les Impressions nouvelles, cahiers de textique, 2017)
- Intellection textique de l'écrit (Les Impressions nouvelles, cahiers de textique, 2017)
- Intellection textique de l'écriture (Les Impressions nouvelles, cahiers de textique, 2017)
- Intelligibilité structurale de la page (Les Impressions nouvelles, cahiers de textique, 2018)
- Salut aux quatre coins - Mallarmé à la loupe (Les Impressions nouvelles, cahiers de textique, 2019)

=== About textics (in English) ===
Interview (with Michel Sirvent): “How to Reduce Fallacious Representative Innocence, Word by Word”, Studies in 20th-century Literature, vol. 15/2, Summer 1991: 277–298.
