= 1985 Nobel Prize in Literature =

- Claude Simon
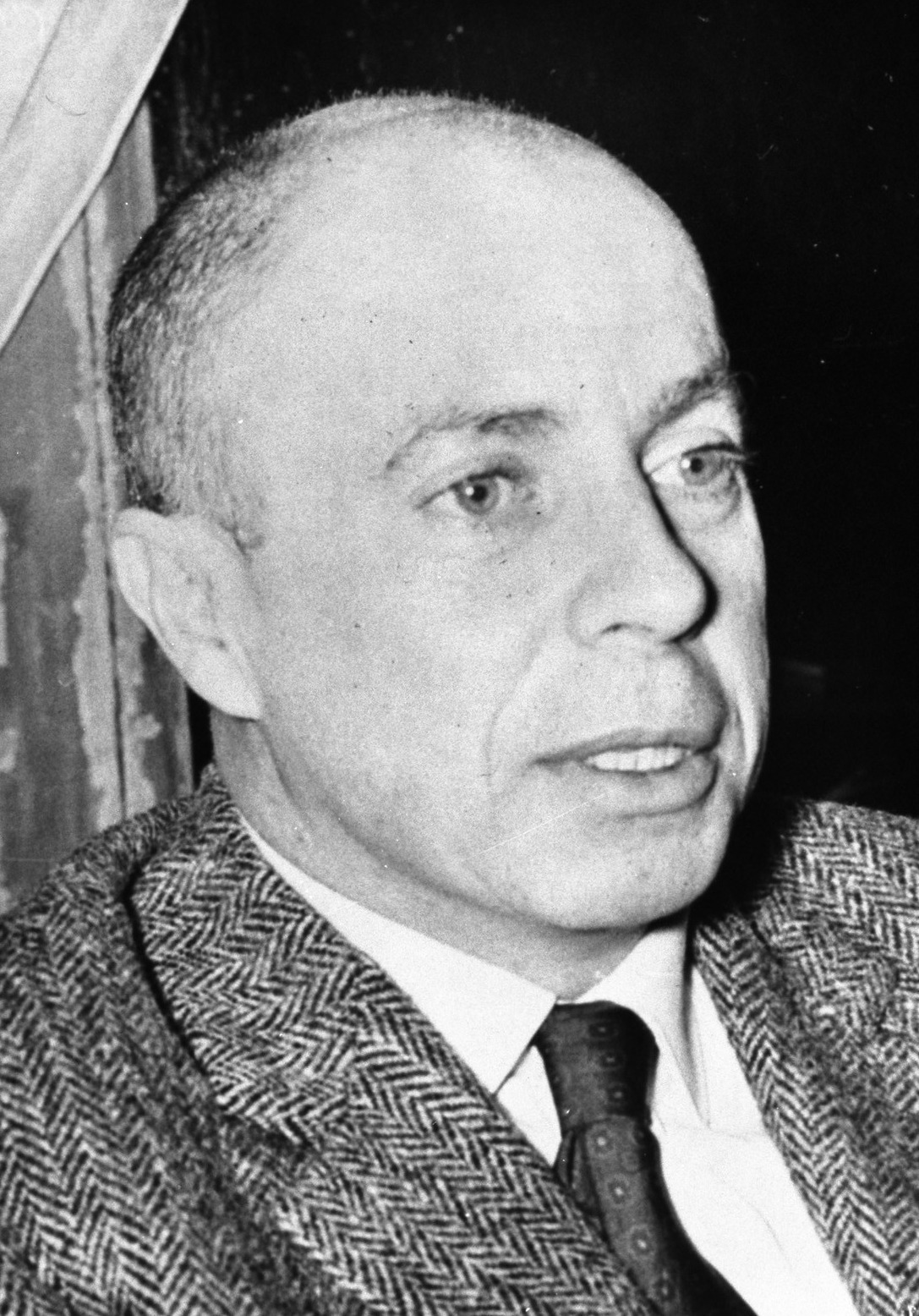
- "who in his novel combines the poet's and the painter's creativeness with a deepened awareness of time in the depiction of the human condition"
- Date: 17 October 1985 (announcement); 10 December 1985 (ceremony)
- Location: Stockholm, Sweden
- Presented by: Swedish Academy
- First award: 1901
- Website: Official website

The 1985 Nobel Prize in Literature was awarded to the French novelist Claude Simon (1913–2005) "who in his novel combines the poet's and the painter's creativeness with a deepened awareness of time in the depiction of the human condition".

== Laureate ==
Associated with the French nouveau roman, Simon's novels are largely autobiographical. He fought in World War II and the Spanish Civil War and these are recurring events in his novels. He published his first novel in 1945. His most important works include L'Herbe (1958), La Route des Flandres (1960), Le Palace (1962) and Histoire (1967).

== Nominations ==
Following the publication of his major works, Claude Simon was annually nominated for the Nobel Prize in Literature by various members of the Swedish Academy's Nobel Committee for Literature nine times between 1967 and 1974, and twice by a British professor in European literature.

== Reactions ==
Claude Simon was among the favourites to win the 1985 Nobel Prize in Literature along with other frequently mentioned candidates Nadine Gordimer (awarded in 1991), Jorge Luis Borges, Graham Greene and Günter Grass (awarded in 1999). Claude Simon was assumed to be a strong contender for the prize as Nobel committee member Artur Lundkvist in 1983 had said that that year's laureate William Golding did not deserve the Nobel Prize and that it should have been awarded to Claude Simon instead. “This is a courageous choice by the Nobel committee,” said Roger Shattuck, a professor of French at the University of Virginia. “Simon’s works are neither popular nor traditional. Simon has earned a place as a major writer working seriously to extend the relations between language, vision and the novel form.” The president of France François Mitterrand congratulated Simon saying the author deserved the award for the originality of his work.

== Award ceremony speech ==
In the award ceremony speech on 10 December 1985, Lars Gyllensten of the Swedish Academy said:

"First and foremost we meet this growth, this vitality and this creativeness and this viability in language and memory, in the shaping, the renewal and the development of what is and was and what rises again inspired and alive through the pictures in words and story for which we seem to be more instruments than masters. Claude Simon’s narrative art may appear as a representation of something that lives within us whether we will or not, whether we understand it or not, whether we believe it or not – something hopeful, in spite of all cruelty and absurdity which for that matter seem to characterize our condition and which is so perceptively, penetratingly and abundantly reproduced in his novels."
