= Gérard Serée =

French painter

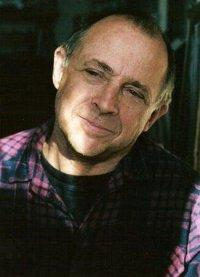
- Gérard Serée in 2007
- Born: Gérard Serée; 1949 (age 76–77); Evreux
- Known for: Engraving, Painting
- Movement: Support/surface, Ecole de Nice

Gérard Serée (born 6 February 1949), is a French artist, known for his collaborations on producing artists' books.

Serée lives and works in Nice, where in 1992 he created his studio called Atelier Gestes et Traces. He moved to Nice in 1969, and started his studies at Villa Arson in 1970, following the teaching of Daniel Dezeuze.

His encounter with Pablo Picasso in 1969, would leave a strong mark to continue his career, for which he said "he marked me in a definitive way and nourished me with his creative energy". In 2018 he was part of a collective exhibition on Picasso in Vence.

Aside from paintings, Serée has produced over 100 artist' books and over 940 engravings in collaboration with 56 authors, poets and writers such as Marie-Claire Bancquart, Bernard Noël, Michel Butor and Daniel Biga. His work is currently present in many collections, with Musée d'art moderne et d'art contemporain, Picasso Museum in Antibes, Museum Paul Valéry Sète, Museum, Paribas de Paris Foundation being among others. He is sometimes associated with the work of other artists from the École de Nice such as Jean-Louis Cantin, Jean-Jacques Condom, Daniel Farioli, Alberte Garibbo, Nivèse, and Bernard Tréal.

== Official website ==
- (in French) Official website
