= The Torments of Love =

1538 novel by Hélisenne de Crenne

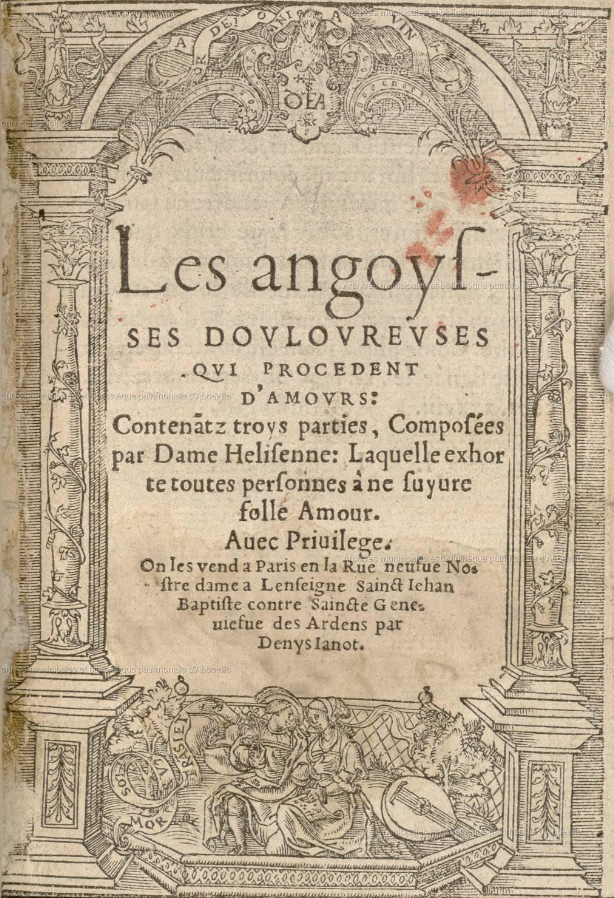
- Author: Hélisenne de Crenne
- Language: Classical French
- Genre: Sentimental novel Chivalric romance
- Published: 1538
- Publisher: Denis Janot
- Publication place: Kingdom of France

The Torments of Love is a French sentimental novel by Hélisenne de Crenne, first published in 1538, that is considered the very first sentimental novel in French literature, and had the benefit of a great success at its first publication. The Torments of Love appears as an antinovel, but without being a parody.

== Form ==
The novel is divided into three main parts. The first part, which exposes a more feminine aspect, perspective, and point of view of this story, is told by Hélisenne. The second part, written by Hélisenne, is, nonetheless, taled by Guénélic, her lover. The third part is composed in the same way as the second one. A conclusion to the novel is written by Quézinstra, following the three main parts described above.

== Plot ==
Hélisenne, who is actually the novel's narrator, is a young woman who has been married at age eleven. One day, she notices a young man named Guénélic, who she immediately falls in love with. She firstly attempts to resist her attraction towards him, by recalling herself what terrible disgrace awaits the adulterous lovers. She recalls very well-known lovers in literature at her time, such as Helen of Troy, Medea, Euryalus or Lucretia in Ancient history, but also lovers such as Lancelot and Guinevere, or Tristan and Iseult, during the Middle Ages. Obsessed and tormented by the thought of Guénélic, Hélisenne resolves herself into loving in secret, without telling him, so she can have the pleasure of a sight on him.

Soon enough, Hélisenne's husband's animosity towards Guénélic causes her a great anxiety, making her secret love the beginning of a torture. Despite the risk, Hélisenne starts staring voluptuously at Guénélic. Her husband minds her loving gesture which leads him to become mad and jealous about it. The husband beats his wife, which causes Hélisenne to lose two of her teeth, she explains. Following this incident, the two lovers begin to write epistles to each other, but Hélisenne has been locked up by her husband, and attempts suicide.

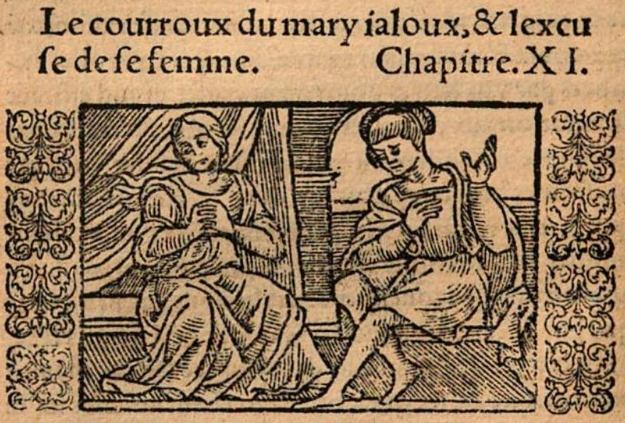
An engraving from the novel.

The husband starts to take pity on Hélisenne, and sends her a priest so that she can confess and reason herself. She acknowledges her adulterous love to the priest, and claims she loves him to death. Later, Hélisenne and Guénélic manage to meet again, and she demands Guénélic to give her proofs of his true love. The husband threatens Hélisenne one more time, by beating her. Taking a flaming torch, he inflames multiple parts of her body. Following this violent scene, Hélisenne prays and requests God's mercy on Guénélic so that her husband won't attempt murder on him.

Guénélic now blames Hélisenne of expressing him empty words, which causes her new anxieties. The young man then starts rumors about his lover, claiming she would be his lascivious partner, which damages Hélisenne's reputation. She blames him for it, and he explains himself, but she later discovers that he continues to spoil her name by his false claims. Hélisenne is also betrayed by her household's servants, who report her activities to her husband. Deceived and isolated, the young woman's bedroom is now her only hideout, where she starts writing her mishaps, in the hope of diminishing the weight of her misadventures by writing them down on paper. Alas, her writing is quickly discovered by the husband. Hélisenne faints and her husband forces his wife to leave the city which they inhabited in, locking her up in the castle of Cabasus, a countryside residence. An old lady, her new servant, reassures her, since Hélisenne did only interact with Guénélic by looking at, and talking to him. Therefore, she advises the young woman to grin and bear it, while hoping for a better condition.
