= Claude Simon =

French novelist (1913–2005)

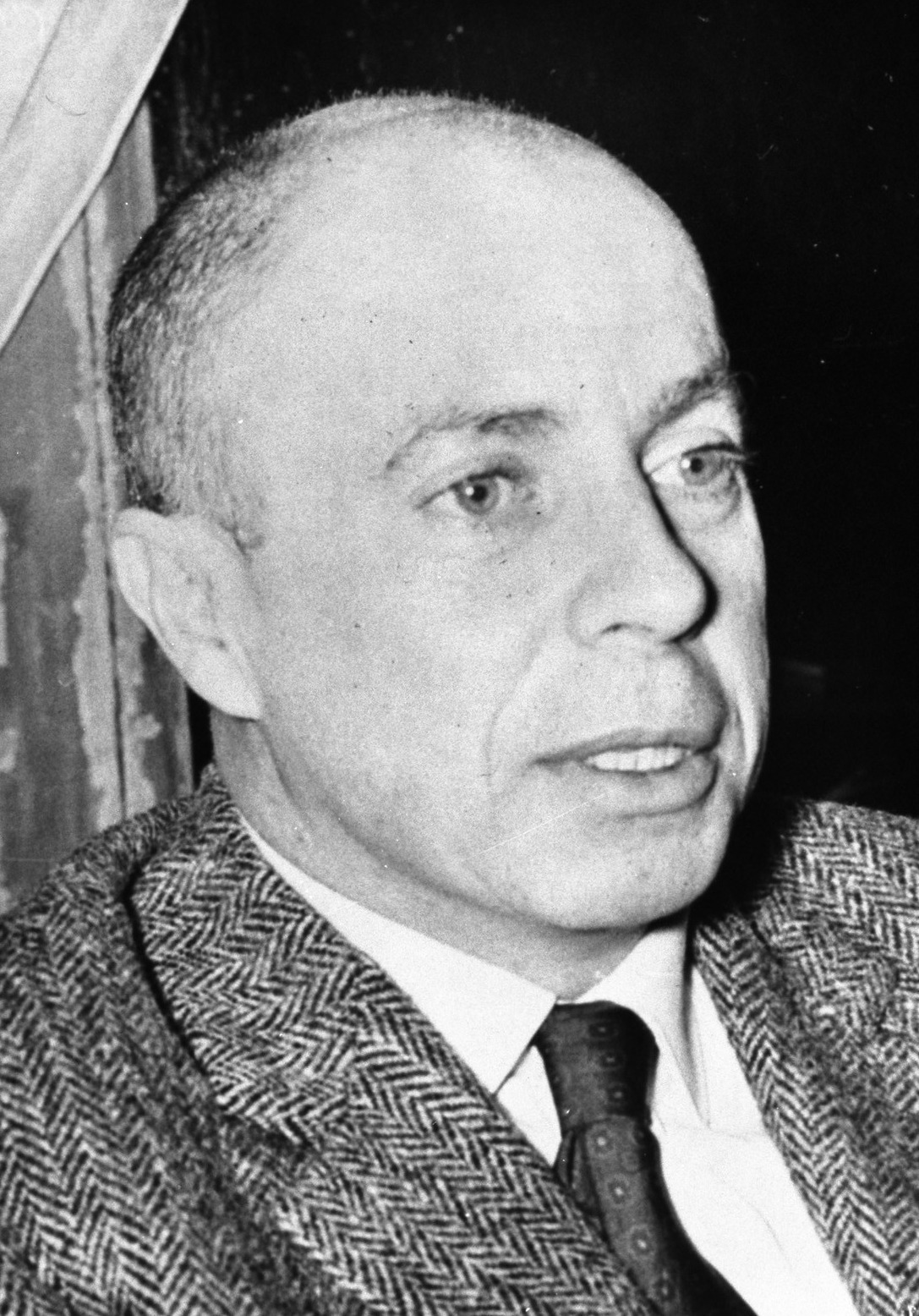
- Simon in 1967
- Born: 10 October 1913; Antananarivo, French Madagascar
- Died: 6 July 2005 (aged 91); Paris, France
- Occupation: Novelist
- Spouse: Rea Simon (died 2017)
- Writing career
- Notable awards: Nobel Prize in Literature; 1985

Claude Eugène Henri Simon (French: [klod simɔ̃]; 10 October 1913 – 6 July 2005) was a French novelist and recipient of the 1985 Nobel Prize in Literature.

== Biography ==
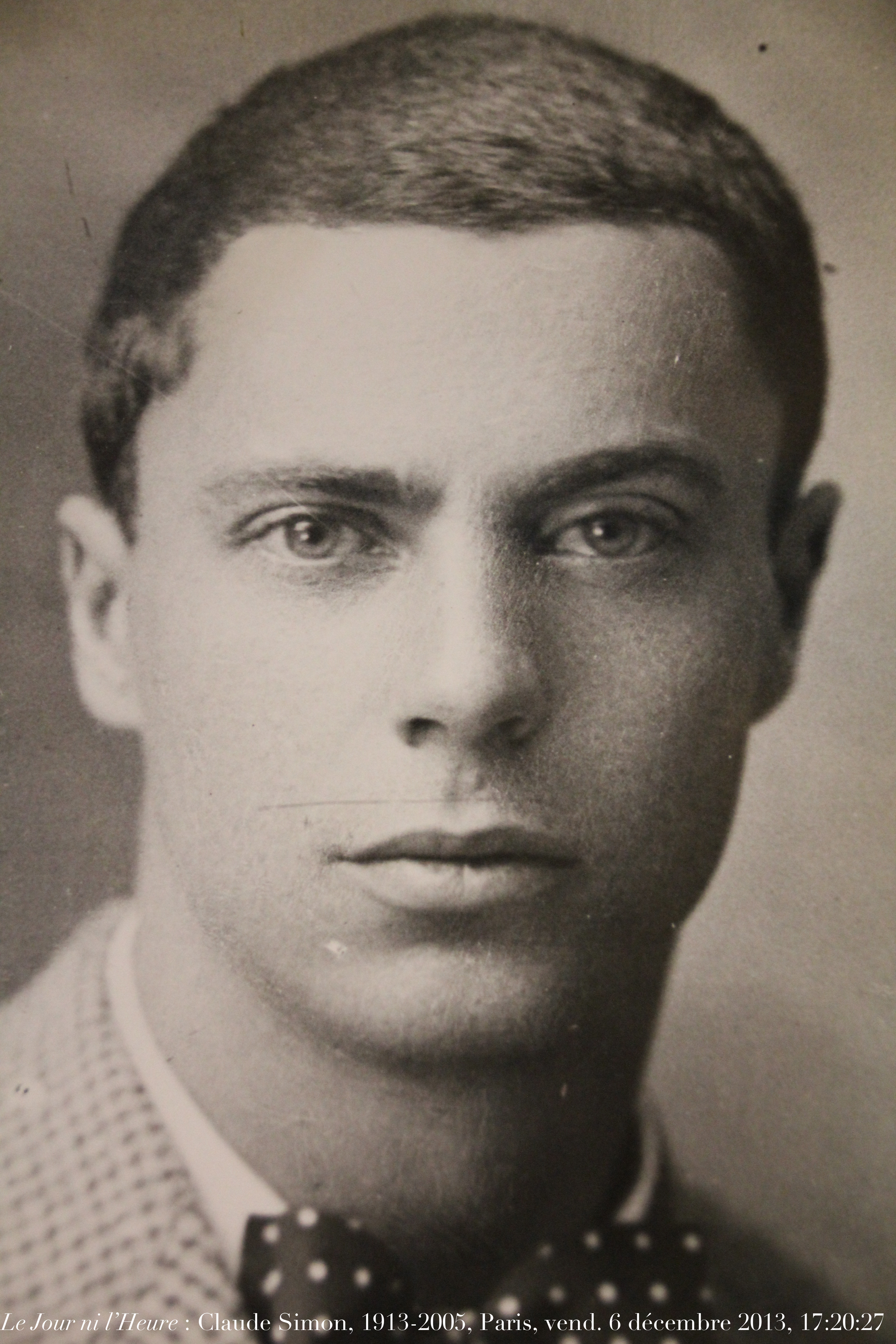
Claude Simon 1932

Claude Simon was born in Tananarive on the isle of Madagascar. His parents were French, and his father was a career officer who was killed in the First World War. He grew up with his mother and her family in Perpignan in the middle of the wine district of Roussillon. Among his ancestors was a general from the time of the French Revolution.

After secondary school at Collège Stanislas in Paris, he took courses in painting at André Lhote's academy. At 21, Simon inherited a small fortune that made him economically independent. In 1935-1936 he made his military service at the 31st cavalry regiment in Lunéville. In 1936 he went to Barcelona and volunteered in the International Brigades during the Spanish Civil War. This experience as well as those from the Second World War show up in his literary work. Simon began writing in 1936. In 1937 he travelled extensively through Spain, Germany, the Soviet Union, Italy, Greece, and Turkey.

Claude Simon was called up by the French army in August 1939, just before the outbreak of the Second World War. In 1940 he took part in the battle of the Meuse and on 17 May escaped a massacre on his cavalry squadron. He was taken prisoner by the Germans, but managed to escape in October 1940 and joined the resistance movement. As a refugee in Perpignan he became friends with the painters Raoul Dufy and Jean Lurçat. At the same time, he completed his first novel, Le Tricheur ("The Cheat", published in 1946), which he had started to write before the war. In 1944 he returned to Paris and the resistance movement.

Claude Simon published around 20 books written in a dense, autobiographical style. His 1960 novel La Route des Flandres, in which he recalled his experiences in the Second World War, is often considered his finest achievement. In 1985 he was awarded the Nobel Prize in Literature with the citation "who in his novel combines the poet's and the painter's creativeness with a deepened awareness of time in the depiction of the human condition."

Claude Simon lived in Paris and used to spend part of the year at Salses in the Pyrenees. To the end of his life Simon insisted on that his profession should be recorded as that of a viticulteur and not a writer, thinking grape farming was a more genuinely remedial trade than writing novels, and toning down the act of writing as no different to what manual workers do.

In 1960, he was a signatory to the Manifesto of the 121 in favour of Algerian independence. In 1961 Claude Simon received the prize of L'Express for La Route des Flandres and in 1967 the Prix Médicis for Histoire. The University of East Anglia made him an honorary doctor in 1973.

== Writing ==
Most of Claude Simon's writing is autobiographical, dealing with personal experiences from World War II and the Spanish Civil War, and his family history. His early novels are largely traditional in form, but with Le vent (1957) and L'Herbe (1958) he developed a style associated with the nouveau roman. La Route de Flandres (1960), which tells about wartime experiences, earned him the L'Express prize and international recognition. In Triptyque (1973) three different stories are mixed together without paragraph breaks. The novels Histoire (1967), Les Géorgiques (1981) and L'Acacia (1989) are largely about Simon's family history.

=== Style and influences ===
Simon is often identified with the nouveau roman movement exemplified in the works of Alain Robbe-Grillet and Michel Butor, and while his fragmented narratives certainly contain some of the formal disruption characteristic of that movement (in particular Histoire, 1967, and Triptyque, 1973), he nevertheless retains a strong sense of narrative and character.

In fact, Simon arguably has much more in common with his Modernist predecessors than with his contemporaries; in particular, the works of Marcel Proust and William Faulkner are a clear influence. Simon's use of self-consciously long sentences (often stretching across many pages and with parentheses sometimes interrupting a clause which is only completed pages later) can be seen to reference Proust's style, and Simon moreover makes use of certain Proustian settings (in La Route des Flandres, for example, the narrator's captain de Reixach is shot by a sniper concealed behind a hawthorn hedge or haie d'aubépines, a reference to the meeting between Gilberte and the narrator across a hawthorn hedge in Proust's À la recherche du temps perdu).

The Faulknerian influence is evident in the novels' extensive use of a fractured timeline with frequent and potentially disorienting analepsis (moments of chronological discontinuity), and of an extreme form of free indirect speech in which narrative voices (often unidentified) and streams of consciousness bleed into the words of the narration. The ghost of Faulkner looms particularly large in 1989's L'Acacia, which uses a number of non-sequential calendar dates covering a wide chronological period in lieu of chapter headings, a device borrowed from Faulkner's The Sound and the Fury.

=== Themes ===
Despite these influences, Simon's work is thematically and stylistically highly original. War is a constant and central theme (indeed it is present in one form or another in almost all of Simon's published works), and Simon often contrasts various individuals' experiences of different historical conflicts in a single novel; World War I and the Second World War in L'Acacia (which also takes into account the impact of war on the widows of soldiers), the French Revolutionary Wars and the Second World War in Les Géorgiques.

In addition, many of the novels deal with the notion of family history, those myths and legends which are passed down through generations and which conspire in Simon's work to affect the protagonists' lives. In this regard, the novels make use of a number of leitmotifs which recur in different combinations between novels (a technique also employed by Marguerite Duras), in particular, the suicide of an eighteenth-century ancestor and the death of a contemporary relative by sniper-fire. Finally, almost all of Simon's novels feature horses; Simon was himself an accomplished equestrian and fought in a mounted regiment during World War II (the ridiculousness of mounted soldiers fighting in a mechanised war is a major theme of La Route des Flandres and Les Géorgiques).

Simon's principal obsession, however, is with the ways in which humans experience time (another Modernist fascination). The novels often dwell on images of old age, such as the decaying 'LSM' or the old woman (that 'flaccid and ectoplasmic Cassandra') in Les Géorgiques, which are frequently seen through the uncomprehending eyes of childhood. Simon's use of family history equally attempts to show how individuals exist in history—that is, how they might feel implicated in the lives and stories of their ancestors who died long ago.

=== Criticism ===
In his book, Orwell's Victory, essayist Christopher Hitchens criticised Simon's deconstruction in Les Géorgiques of George Orwell's account of the Spanish Civil War, pointing out that Orwell had fought alongside POUM, while Simon had fought "on the side of the Stalintern forces". Hitchens' criticism has itself been criticised by historian Roseanna Webster.

== Seminars ==
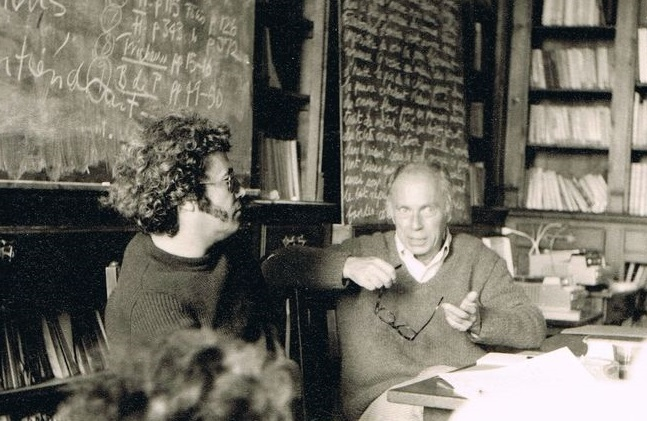
Jean Ricardou and Claude Simon (Cerisy, France).

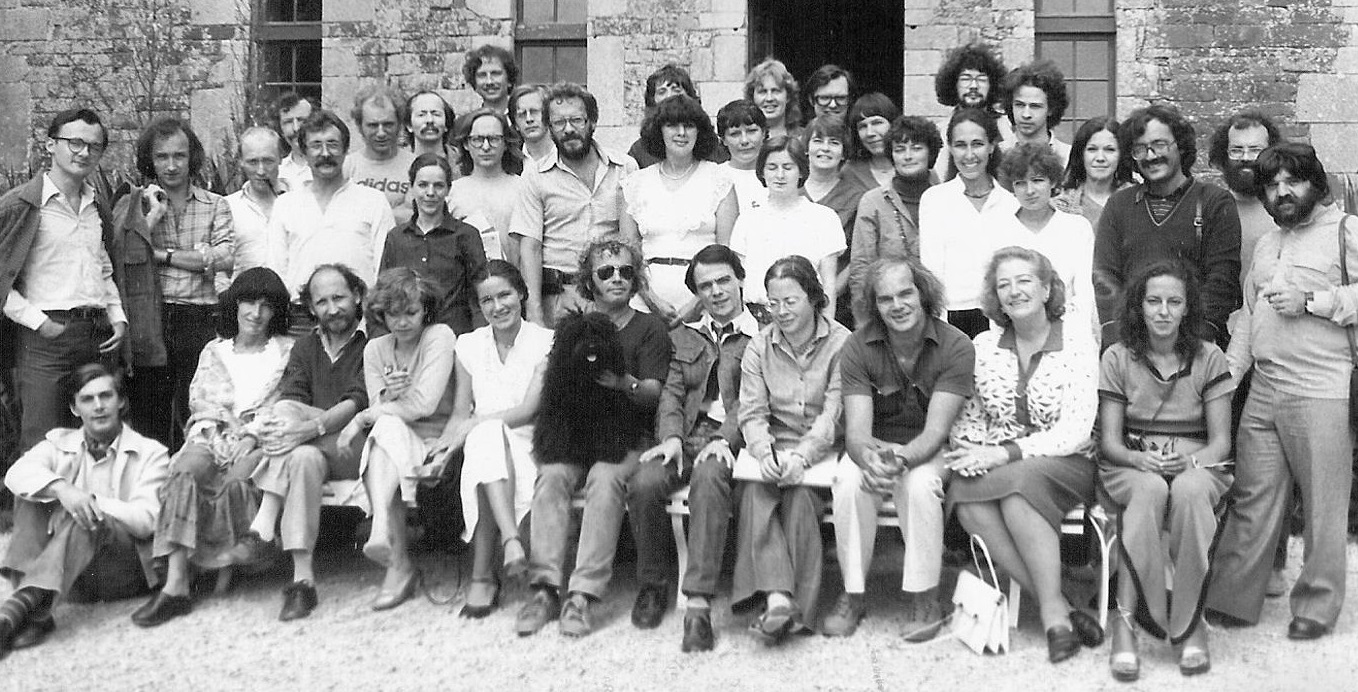
Contemporary literature workshop with Marc Avelot, Philippe Binant, Bernard Magné, Claudette Oriol-Boyer, Jean Ricardou during the writing of Les Géorgiques (The Georgics) (Cerisy, France, 1980).

Jean Ricardou (Director) :

- Nouveau roman : hier, aujourd'hui, Cerisy (France), 1971.
- Claude Simon : analyse, théorie, Cerisy (France), 1974.
- Pour une théorie matérialiste du texte, Cerisy (France), 1980.

== Works ==
=== Novels ===
- Le Tricheur (1946). The Cheat
- La Corde raide (1947). The Tightrope
- Gulliver (1952)
- Le Sacre du Printemps (1954). The Rite of Spring
- Le Vent : tentative de restitution d'un rétable baroque (1957). The Wind, trans. Richard Howard (Braziller, 1959)
- L'Herbe (1958). The Grass, trans. Richard Howard (Braziller, 1960)
- La Route des Flandres (1960). The Flanders Road, trans. Richard Howard (Braziller, 1961)
- Le Palace (1962). The Palace, trans. Richard Howard (Braziller, 1963)
- Histoire (1967). Histoire, trans. Richard Howard (Braziller, 1968)
- La Bataille de Pharsale (1969). The Battle of Pharsalus, trans. Richard Howard (Braziller, 1971
- Orion aveugle (1970). Blind Orion
- Les Corps conducteurs (1971). Conducting Bodies, trans. Helen R. Lane (Viking Press, 1974)
- Triptyque (1973). Triptych, trans. Helen R. Lane (Viking Press, 1976)
- Leçon de choses (1975). The World About Us, trans. Daniel Weissbort (Ontario Review Press, 1983)
- Les Géorgiques (1981). The Georgics, trans. Beryl and John Fletcher (Riverrun Press, 1989)
- L'Invitation (1987). The Invitation, trans. Jim Cross (Dalkey Archive, 1991)
- L'Acacia (1989). The Acacia, trans. Richard Howard (Pantheon, 1990)
- Le Jardin des plantes (1997). The Jardin des Plantes, trans. Jordan Stump (Northwestern University Press, 2001)
- Le Tramway (2001). The Trolley, trans. Richard Howard (New Press, 2002)

=== Other works ===
- La Separation (1963; play, adapted from the novel L'Herbe). The Separation
- Femmes : sur 23 peintures de Joan Miró (1966; republished as La Chevelure de Bérénice, 1984). Berenice’s Golden Mane, trans. Simon Green (Alyscamps, 1998)

=== Collected edition in French ===
Œuvres (Bibliothèque de la Pléiade):

- Tome I (Gallimard, 2006), including Le Vent: Tentative de restitution d'un retable baroque, La Route des Flandres, Le Palace, La Bataille de Pharsale, La Chevelure de Bérénice (Reprise du texte Femmes), Triptyque, Le Jardin des Plantes, and other writings.
- Tome II (Gallimard, 2013), including L'Herbe, Histoire, Les Corps conducteurs, Leçon de choses, Les Géorgiques, L'Invitation, L'Acacia, Le Tramway, and other writings.

== Awards and honors ==
- 1960: Prix de l'Express, for La Route des Flandres
- 1967: Prix Médicis, for Histoire
- 1985: Nobel Prize in Literature
