= Bernard Noël =

French writer and poet (1930–2021)

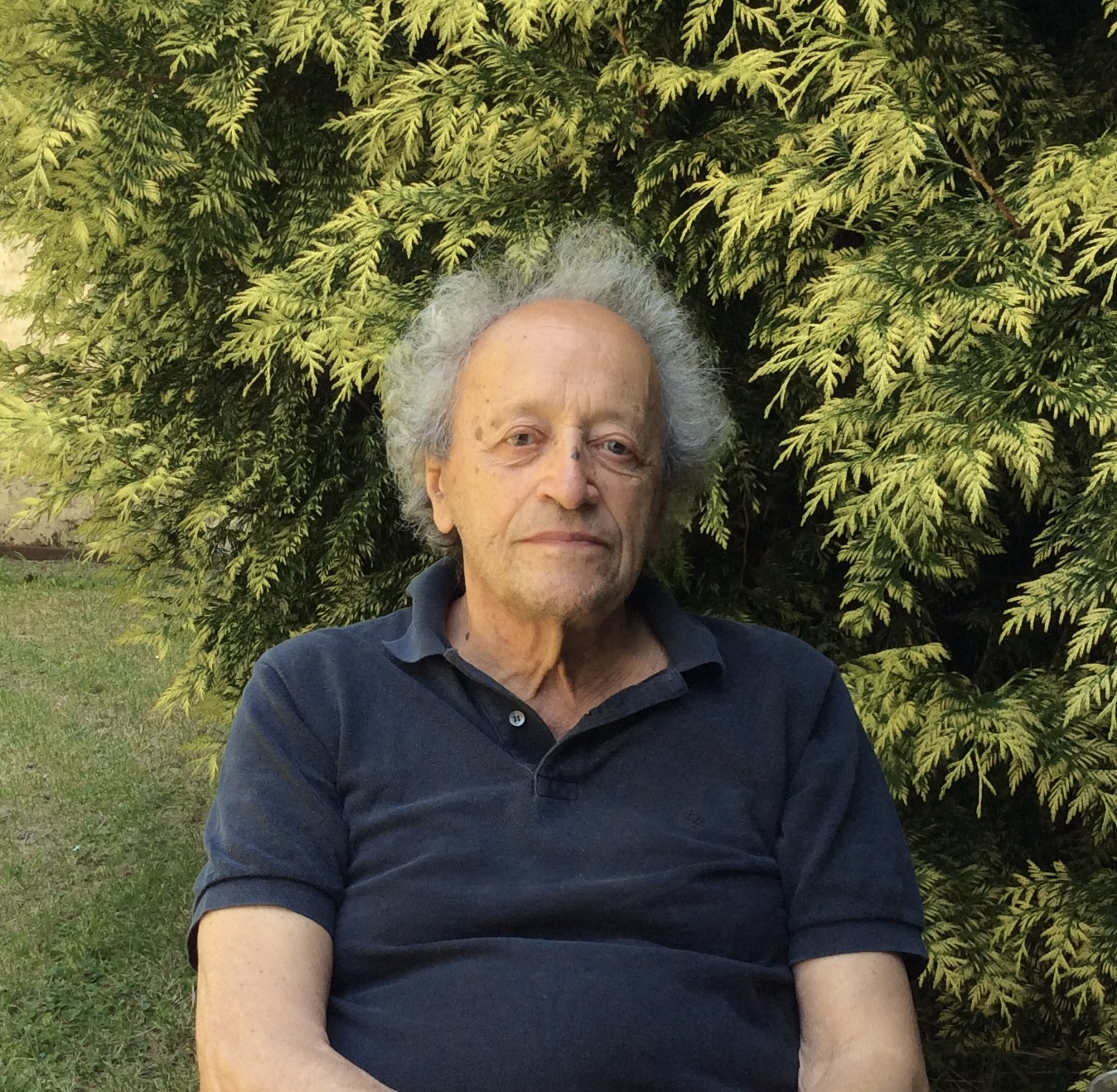
- Noël in 2014
- Born: Urbain Bernard Fernand Noël; 19 November 1930; Sainte-Geneviève-sur-Argence, France
- Died: 13 April 2021 (aged 90); Laon, France
- Citizenship: French
- Occupations: Poet, essayist, art critic, novelist, visual artist, translator, playwright, literary critic, editor, writer, historian
- Writing career
- Pen name: Urbain d'Orlhac
- Notable works: Extraits du corps, Le Château de Cène, Dictionnaire de la Commune, La Langue d'Anna, Le Syndrome de Gramsci, Le Reste du voyage, La Maladie du sens, Romans d'un regard, Magritte, Les Plumes d’Éros Œuvres I, L’ Outrage aux mots Œuvres II, La Place de l’autre Œuvres III, La Comédie intime, Le Chemin d'encre
- Notable awards: Prix Guillaume Apollinaire 1976, Grand prix de poésie de la SGDL 1973, Prix France Culture 1988, Grand prix national de la poésie 1992, Prix Max Jacob 2005, Robert Ganzo Prize 2010, Grand pride de poésie Académie Française 2015
- Website: atelier-bernardnoel.com

Bernard Noël (19 November 1930 – 13 April 2021) was a French writer and poet. He received the Grand Prix national de la poésie (National Grand Prize of Poetry) in 1992, the Prix Robert Ganzo (Robert Ganzo Prize) in 2010, as well as the Grand prix de poésie from the Académie Française for his entire poetic work in 2016.

His book Le Reste du Voyage was translated into English by Eléna Rivera and published by Graywolf Press in 2011; it won the Robert Fagles Translation Prize from the National Poetry Series.

== Biography ==
Noël published his first book of poetry, Les Yeux Chimeres, in 1955. This was followed by the prose poems Extraits du corps (Essence of the body or Extracts from the text) in 1958.

He then waited nine years before publishing his next book, La Face de silence (The Face of Silence, 1967), and eventually the controversial Le Château de Cène (Castle supper, 1969), erotic fiction that has been read as a protest against the war in Algeria. Noël is also known for his artists' books in collaboration with Gérard Serée. He also kept up a correspondence with the Italian poet Nella Nobili when she moved to Paris.
