= Hélisenne de Crenne =

French novelist, epistolary writer and translator

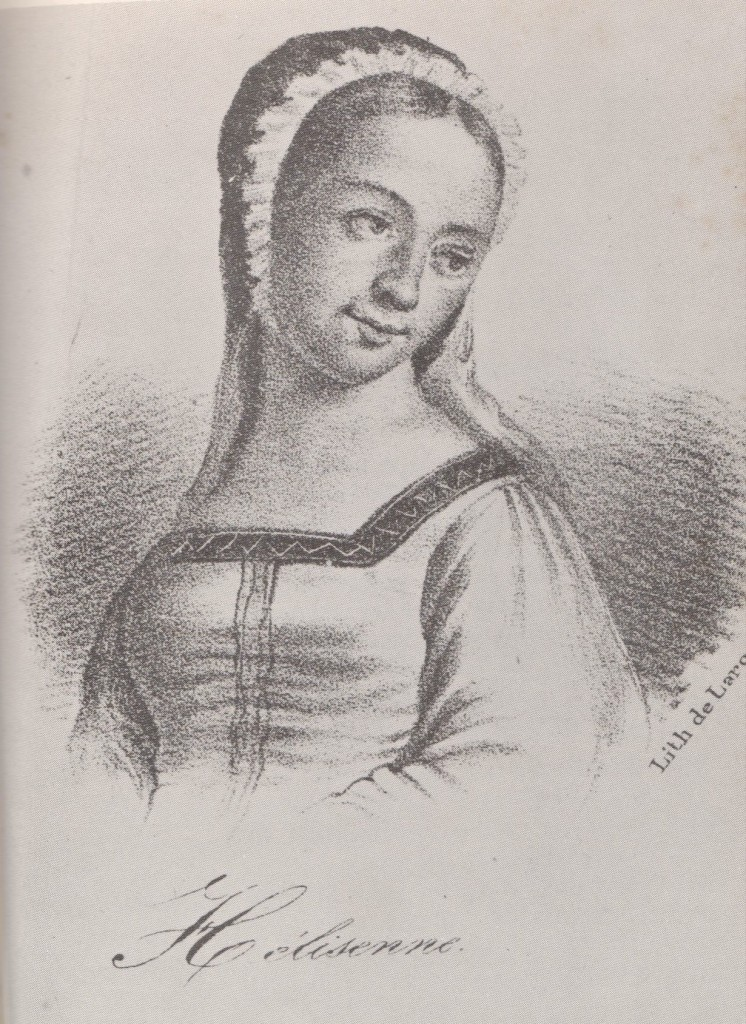
- Engraving of Hélisenne de Crenne
- Born: Marguerite Briet; 1510; Abbeville, Picardy, Kingdom of France
- Died: After 1552; Near Paris, Kingdom of France
- Occupations: Novelist, writer, translator
- Writing career
- Period: Sixteenth century
- Genres: Novel, epistles, dialogue
- Notable works: The Torments of Love, Familiar and Invectives Letters, The Dream
- Literary movement: Humanism

Hélisenne de Crenne was a French novelist, epistolary writer and translator during the Renaissance. Critics generally agree that "Hélisenne de Crenne" was the pseudonym of Marguerite Briet (c. 1510, Abbeville – after 1552), a French gentlewoman married to Philippe Fournel de Crenne. It is however also generally recognized that this attribution remains somewhat speculative, as it is based on limited extant documentation and extrapolation of the "biographical" elements from her work.

== Life ==
Marguerite Briet was a noblewoman from Abbeville, in Picardy, but wrote in Paris in the 1530s and 1540s. She was well educated, learning enough Latin to be able to translate Virgil. She married Philippe Fournel, Sieur de Crenne, but they separated financially.

Her identity was established in 1917 by the French literary scholar L. Loviot. Although there is no proof that Marguerite Briet is the author of the entirety of the works signed "Hélisenne de Crenne", few critics doubt the attribution. A character named "Hélisenne" is present in her three books.

== Works ==
Her three original works are:

- Les Angoisses douloureuses qui procèdent d'amours (The Torments of Love, 1538)
- Les Epistres familières et invectives (Personal and Invective Letters, 1539)
- Le Songe (The Dream, 1540)

She also wrote a translation into French prose of the first four books of Virgil's Aeneid:

- Les Quatre premiers livres des Eneydes du treselegant poete Virgile. Traduictz de Latin en prose Françoyse (1541)

According to a recent scholar, Hélisenne's Aeneid is "little known and less read (only three manuscripts are known to survive), despite marking a vitally important moment in feminism, translation and the classics." However, it not just "an incomplete translation, but a radical intervention upon Virgil's epic.... By cutting off her narrative... [she] concludes with Dido's abandonment and suicide, erasing Aeneas' later triumphs and Rome's imperial destiny." Hélisenne's Eneydes amounts to a "remarkable achievement in Renaissance humanism and the history of feminism," whereby she emphasizes "the role of gender in translation" and her power "to transform classical texts and make them her own."

In 1551, Hélisenne's works were ostensibly corrected by the French translator Claude Colet, who eliminated many of her Italian and Latin borrowings. Her collected works were last published in 1560.

Quite successful in the first half of the 16th century, as the republication of her works attest, Helisenne de Crenne was largely forgotten by the beginning of the 17th century. Her work was rediscovered at the end of the 19th century by the French literary scholars Gustave Reynier (who wrote about her novel in his Le Roman sentimental avant l'Astrée (1908)) and Verdun-Léon Saulnier. Since the 1980s, her works have gained increased attention by literary scholars and have been translated into the English language because of both her historical status as an author and her significance to women's literary history.

== Les Angoisses douloureuses ==
Hélisenne de Crenne's novel is a unique blending of sentimental and chivalric elements (at the end of the novel, Athena—who sees the work in terms of battles and combats—and Venus—who sees the work in terms of love—fight over the book), humanist scholarship, oral expression, and eloquence. The work is divided in three books, each introduced by an epistle from the author, and an epilogue. All of these are narrated in the first person, an uncommon choice for the period. The three sections of the novel are extremely different in tone and genre: the first book is sentimental and redacted from the point of view of the heroine; the second book is apparently more conventional, as a chivalry quest recounted from a male point of view; the third book, also from the male point of view, recounts the reunion of the lovers. The final epilogue shows both the influence of Hélisenne's translation of the Aeneid and her interest in "dream" tales. The shifting points of view are accompanied by changing beliefs; for instance, judgements made by the female narrator about her lover Guenelic in the first book are modified by his actions in the second part.

Although the overall tone and the title of the work make this a cautionary tale on the folly of love, Hélisenne puts numerous praises of love (heavily indebted to Renaissance Neoplatonism) in the mouth of certain characters. The amorous and pathetic sections of the novel are heavily indebted to Boccaccio's Lady Fiammeta and its psychologically insightful portrayal of a woman spurned. Other influences include Libro del Peregrino by Giacomo (ou Jacopo) Caviceo (which tells of a dream in which the ghost of Peregrin gives the story of his tragic loves) and Les Illustrations de Gaule by Jean Lemaire de Belges. The novel features extensive polite and rhetorically sophisticated dialogues and frequent exempla ("copia") taken from classical antiquity and (occasionally) from medieval novels, the Bible and the fathers of the church. The story takes place in and around the Mediterranean, and although the customs and jousts appear to be of the 16th century, oaths, prayers and divine visitations are mostly classically inspired (the section with the hermit and the scene of the lovers' death are among the few with extensive Christian examples) and churches are referred to as "temples".

The first book is the story of Hélisenne, a married (at the age of 11) noble woman who falls in love with a young non-noble youth she catches sight of from her house. Amid scenes of doubt, passion, and fear, and with letters exchanged and meetings in public places, the female narrator tries to escape her husband's watchful and jealous eye, but at the end of the book the husband locks her up in a country residence (the château of Cabasus) and Hélisenne decides to write and circulate her story in the hope it will come into the hands of her lover.

Book two is told from the point of view of the young lover Guenelic (as imagined by Hélisenne) who teams up with a young noble named Quezinstra to search the world for Hélisenne. They arrive in a foreign court, Guenelic is knighted, and the two friends battle other knights in jousts and Quezinstra is crowned victor. After other travels, they arrive on an island ruled by a beautiful queen, and when the island is attacked, Guenelic and Quezinstra help defend it; Guenelic (who is mistaken for his friend) is captured and about to be executed, but the noble brother of the attacker convinces him to spare Guenelic's life and to settle the battle with a man-to-man combat; Quezinstra is chosen to represent the queen and he wins this fight and the war is ended. The friends then enroll in the service of a foreign prince who is trying to subjugate a rebellious city; Quezinstra once again plays a pivotal role in the successful battle and he counsels the prince to use clemency with the town.

Book three (still from Guenelic's perspective) has the two friends come first to Genoa, and from there to a desert island where they talk with a saintly hermit. From there they come to the region where Hélisenne is locked up under the control of her husband's sister. After letters exchanged and a conversation by a window at night between the lovers, Guenelic and Quezinstra help Hélisenne to escape. Unfortunately, the husband's sister sends her men to intercept them, and Guenelic and his friend are forced to leave Hélisenne in the woods while they fight their assailants. Victorious, they return to find Hélisenne at the point of death; she repents her actions, prays to God, and asks Guenelic to think of his own salvation and then swoons. In his sorrow, Guenelic, too, prays and dies.

The epilogue is told by Quezinstra who recounts the death of the two lovers. He is then visited by Mercury, who reveals to him the manuscript written by Hélisenne which tells of all of their adventures. Mercury takes Quezinstra with him to Hades and the lovers are judged by Minos and are permitted entry to the Elysian Fields. At a banquet of the gods, Jupiter orders the publishing of the manuscript in Paris. The novel ends with Quezinstra building a tomb for the lovers and urging the reader to abandon transitory things for permanent things.
