= La Modification =

1957 novel by Michel Butor

- Author: Michel Butor
- Original title: La Modification
- Translator: Jean Stewart
- Language: French
- Publisher: Faber and Faber (first English edition)
- Publication date: 1957
- Publication place: France

La Modification is a novel by Michel Butor first published in French in 1957. It is the author's most famous work. It was translated into English by Jean Stewart, with the title Second Thoughts (Faber and Faber, 1958) as well as under the titles A Change of Heart (Simon & Schuster, 1959) and Changing Track (Calder, 2017; revised translation).

== Plot summary ==
The plot is quite straightforward: a middle-aged man, Léon Delmont, takes the train from Paris to Rome to visit his lover, Cécile, whom he has not informed of his arrival. They have met in secret once a month for the past two years: each time that his business trips have taken him to the Italian capital. He now intends to tell her that he has finally decided to leave his wife, found a job for her (Cécile) in Paris and is ready to take her back there and live with her.

The novel describes his gradual change of mind. His initial enthusiasm and hopes of a rejuvenating new start slowly give way to doubt, fear and cowardice. He eventually decides to spend the week-end in Rome alone, go back to Paris the following Monday without saying anything to Cécile and leave the situation as it was until their relationship eventually ends. He will write about this failure in a book which happens to be La Modification itself.

== Major themes ==
One of the most striking characteristics of the book is the very unusual use of the formal second-person ("Vous" – "You") to refer to the main character, a narrative technique known as second-person narration. "Vous", the second-person plural, is a more respectful form of address, in contrast to the more intimate second person singular "Tu".

The story is remarkably concentrated as far as time and space are concerned. The entire action takes place in less than 24 hours and never leaves the train in which the main character is travelling, except during the flashbacks.

La Modification contains both realistic and fantastic elements. On the one hand, the various landscapes, the passengers, the interior of the carriage are described down to the last detail. On the other, there are many eerie episodes. For instance, as the train passes the Fontainebleau Forest, the main character sees the "Grand Veneur", a ghost rider that is rumoured to haunt it and ask questions to the persons he comes across. It reappears several times in the book (thus becoming a leitmotiv).

Its questions always echo the state of mind of the main character: "Can you hear me?", "Can you see me?", "Who are you?", "What do you want?", "Where are you going?", "What are you looking for?". All these surreal episodes culminate in a nightmare in which the main character is judged and condemned by the decayed corpses of the old Roman Emperors and the pagan gods who deem him unworthy and deny him entry to the city.

The opposition between the pagan Rome (Cécile) and the Christian one (the wife) is also central to the book. In this respect, it is significant that, in several of the story's flashbacks, the main character is reading the Letters of Julian the Apostate, the emperor who rejected Christianity and sought to restore traditional polytheism.

Delmont gradually realises that his love for Cécile is motivated by his fascination for the mystery of Rome, a mystery that he will never be able to understand. Living with her in Paris would ruin everything, would make her lose her appeal since she was important only in that she introduced him to the secrets of the city.

The novel can also be seen as a psychological case study. At the beginning of the book, the main character's determination and enthusiasm seem unshakable. However, Butor's extremely detailed and careful analysis of the slow, almost mechanical workings of doubt and fear make his eventual change of mind absolutely inevitable.

== Reception ==
The novel won the Prix Renaudot in 1957. It was praised by Michel Leiris. A reviewer for Kirkus Reviews called it "an experimental novel of some virtuosity" but felt it was "almost divorced from feeling".

== See also ==
- Le Monde's 100 Books of the Century
