= Robbe-Grillet =

Robbe-Grillet is a compound surname. Notable people with this surname include:

- Alain Robbe-Grillet (1922–2008), French writer and filmmaker
- Catherine Robbe-Grillet (née Rstakian; born 1930), French writer, dominatrix, photographer, theatre and film actress
