= Michel Butor =

French poet, novelist, teacher, essayist, art critic and translator

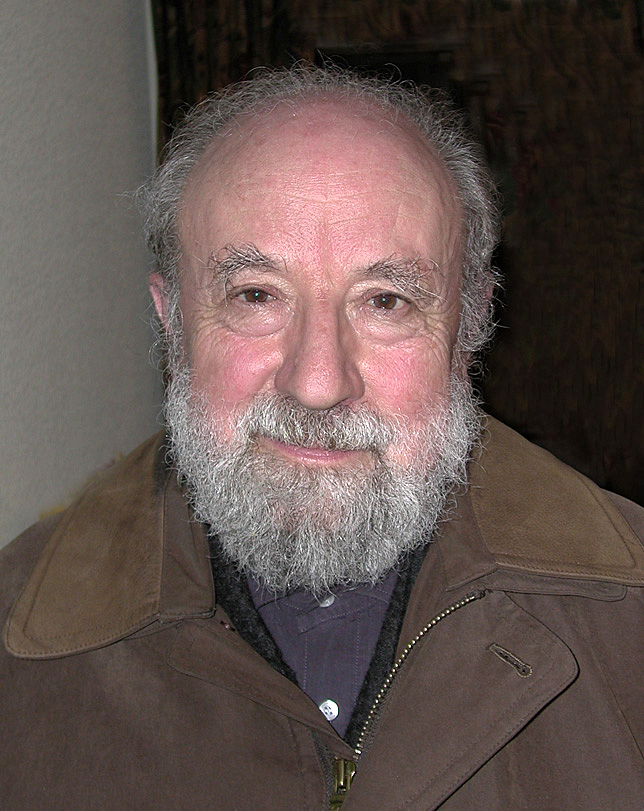
- Michel Butor in 2002
- Born: Michel Marie François Butor; 14 September 1926; Mons-en-Barœul, Nord, France
- Died: 24 August 2016 (aged 89); Contamine-sur-Arve, France
- Education: University of Paris
- Occupation: Writer
- Writing career
- Genres: Novel; criticism
- Notable works: L'Emploi du temps La Modification; Mobile

Michel Butor (French: [miʃɛl bytɔʁ]; 14 September 1926 – 24 August 2016) was a French poet, novelist, teacher, essayist, art critic and translator.

== Life and work ==
Michel Marie François Butor was born in Mons-en-Barœul, a suburb of Lille, the third of seven children. His parents were Émile Butor (1891–1960), a railroad inspector and Anna (née Brajeux, 1896–1972). He studied philosophy at the Sorbonne, graduating in 1947.

In 1950–51, he taught French in Minya, Egypt, followed by teaching assignments in Manchester (1951–53), Thessaloniki (1954–55) and Geneva (1956–57). In 1958, he married Marie-Josèphe (née Mas); they had four daughters.

His first novel, Passage de Milan, was published in 1954, followed by L'Emploi du temps (1956), which won the Prix Fénéon, and by La Modification in 1957, which won the Prix Renaudot. His final novel, Degrés, was published in 1960.

In 1960, he was a visiting professor at Bryn Mawr College and Middlebury College. His travels around the United States at this time resulted in his first experimental book, Mobile, published in 1962 to a controversial reception.

In the following years, he wrote in a variety of forms, from essays to poetry to artist's books. For artist's books he collaborated with artists like Gérard Serée. Literature, painting and travel were subjects particularly dear to Butor. Part of the fascination of his writing is the way it combines the rigorous symmetries that led Roland Barthes to praise him as an epitome of structuralism (exemplified, for instance, by the architectural scheme of Passage de Milan or the calendrical structure of L'emploi du temps) with a lyrical sensibility more akin to Baudelaire than to Robbe-Grillet.

Journalists and critics have associated his novels with the nouveau roman, but Butor himself long resisted that association. The main point of similarity is a very general one, not much beyond that; like exponents of the nouveau roman, he can be described as an experimental writer. His best-known novel, La Modification, for instance, is written entirely in the second person. In his 1967 La critique et l'invention, he famously said that even the most literal quotation is already a kind of parody because of its "trans-contextualization."

After meeting in 1977, Butor became a friend of Elinor S. Miller, a French professor at Rollins College at the time. They worked collaboratively on translations, catalogues and lectures. In 2002, Miller published a book on Butor entitled Prisms and Rainbows: Michel Butor's Collaborations with Jacques Monory, Jiri Kolar, and Pierre Alechinsky.

In an interview in the Museum of Modern Art, New York, conducted in 2006, the poet John Ashbery described how he wanted to sit next to Michel Butor at a dinner in New York.

In 2013, Butor was awarded the Grand prix de littérature de l'Académie française. He died on 24 August 2016 in southeastern France.

Michel Butor was a foundational member of The Raymond Roussel Society, established in 2016 alongside notable contemporaries including John Ashbery, Miquel Barceló, Joan Bofill-Amargós, Thor Halvorssen, and Hermes Salceda. The society, dedicated to celebrating and studying the works of the innovative and enigmatic writer Raymond Roussel, brought together a group of intellectuals and artists with a shared passion for Roussel's literary legacy. Through this collaboration, Butor's influence and expertise contributed significantly to the society's mission of exploring Roussel's unique literary techniques and promoting a deeper understanding of his innovative contributions to the world of literature.

== Awards and honours ==
- 1957 Prix Fénéon, for L'Emploi du temps
- 1957 Prix Renaudot, for La Modification
- 1960 Grand prix de la Critique littéraire, for Répertoire I
- 1998 Grand prix du romantisme Chateaubriand, for Improvisations sur Balzac
- 2006 Prix Mallarmé, for Seize lustres
- 2007 SACEM Grand prix des poètes
- 2013 Grand prix de littérature de l'Académie française, for his body of work
- 2016 Grand prix de poésie de la SGDL, for Ruines d'avenir : un livre tapisserie

== Selected bibliography ==
This bibliography is organized according to categories suggested by Jean Duffy's guide to Michel Butor.

=== Novels ===
- Passage de Milan (Les Éditions de Minuit, 1954). Chapters VII-X, trans. Guy Daniels in The Award Avant-Garde Reader (1965). Chapters XI-XII in The Carleton Miscellany (1963).
- L'Emploi du temps (Les Éditions de Minuit, 1956). Passing Time, trans. Jean Stewart (Simon & Schuster, 1960; Faber and Faber, 1961; Pariah Press, 2021).
- La Modification (Les Éditions de Minuit, 1957). Trans. Jean Stewart as Second Thoughts (Faber and Faber, 1958), A Change of Heart (Simon & Schuster, 1959) and Changing Track (Calder, 2017; revised).
- Degrés (Gallimard, 1960). Degrees, trans. Richard Howard (Simon & Schuster, 1961; Methuen, 1962; Dalkey Archive, 2005).

=== Experimental texts ===
- Mobile : étude pour une représentation des États-Unis (Gallimard, 1962). Mobile: Study for a Representation of the United States, trans. Richard Howard (Simon & Schuster, 1963; Dalkey Archive, 2004).
- Réseau aérien : texte radiophonique (Gallimard, 1962). Commissioned by RTF and broadcast on 16 June 1962.
- Description de San Marco (Gallimard, 1963). Description of San Marco, trans. Barbara Mason (York Press, 1983).
- 6 810 000 litres d'eau par seconde : étude stéréophonique (Gallimard, 1965). Niagara: A Stereophonic Novel, trans. Elinor S. Miller (Regnery, 1969). Also adapted as an English-language broadcast for BBC Home Service on 1 December 1965, translated by Rayner Heppenstall.
- Intervalle : anecdote en expansion (Gallimard, 1973)

=== Essays ===
- Répertoire [I–V] (1960; 1964; 1968; 1974; 1982)
- Histoire extraordinaire : essai sur un rêve de Baudelaire (1961). Histoire extraordinaire: Essay on a Dream of Baudelaire's, trans. Richard Howard (Cape, 1969).
- Essais sur les modernes (1964)
- Essais sur Les Essaies (1968)
- Essais sur le roman (1969). A selection of 13 essays from Répertoire and Répertoire II.
- Improvisations sur Flaubert (1984)
- Improvisations sur Henri Michaux (1985)
- Improvisations sur Rimbaud (1989)
- Improvisations sur Michel Butor : l'écriture en transformation (1993). Improvisations on Butor: Transformation of Writing, trans. Elinor S. Miller (University Press of Florida, 1996).
- L'Utilité poétique (1995)
- Improvisations sur Balzac [I–III] (1998)

=== Other ===
- Le Génie du lieu [1-5] (1958–96):
  - Le Génie du lieu (1958). The Spirit of Mediterranean Places, trans. Lydia Davis (Marlboro Press, 1986).
  - Où : le Génie du lieu, 2 (1971)
  - Boomerang : le Génie du lieu, 3 (1978). Letters from the Antipodes, partial trans. Michael Spencer (University of Queensland Press, 1981).
  - Transit : le Génie du lieu, 4 (1992)
  - Gyroscope : autrement dit le Génie du lieu, 5 et dernier (1996)
- Hérold (1964)
- Illustrations [I–IV] (1964; 1969; 1973; 1976)
- Portrait de l'artiste en jeune singe (Gallimard, 1967). Portrait of the Artist as a Young Ape: A Caprice, trans. Dominic Di Bernardi (Dalkey Archive, 1995).
- La Banlieue de l’Aube à l’Aurore (Fata Morgana, 1968). The Suburbs from Dawn to Daybreak, trans. Jeffrey Gross (2013)
- Les Mots dans la peinture (1969)
- Votre Faust: Fantaisie variable genre Opéra (with Henri Pousseur) (premiered 1969)
- La Rose des Vents : 32 Rhumbs pour Charles Fourier (Gallimard, 1970)
- Travaux d'approche (Gallimard, 1972)
- Matière de rêves [I–V] (1975–1985):
  - Matière de rêves (1975)
  - Second sous-sol : Matière de rêves II (1976)
  - Troisième dessous : Matière de rêves III (1977)
  - Quadruple fond : Matière de rêves IV (1981)
  - Mille et un plis : Matière de rêves V (1985)
- Vanité : conversation dans les Alpes-Maritimes (1980)
- Envois (Gallimard, 1980)
- Exprès : Envois II (Gallimard, 1983)
- Avant-Goût [I–IV] (1984; 1987; 1989; 1992)
- Frontières : entretiens avec Christian Jacomino (1985). Frontiers, trans. Elinor S. Miller (Summa Publications, 1989).
- Le Retour du boomerang (1988)
- L'Embarquement de la Reine de Saba : d'après le tableau de Claude Lorrain (1989)
- Parrure (1994). Ethnic Jewelry: Africa, Asia, and the Pacific, trans. Daniel Wheeler, Mary Laing, and Emily Lane (Vendome Press, 1994).
- Entretiens : Quarante ans de vie littéraire (1999). In three volumes, covering 1956 to 1996.
- Quant au livre : triptyque en l'honneur de Gauguin (2000)
- Seize lustres (Gallimard, 2006)
- Ruines d'avenir : un livre tapisserie (Actes Sud Editions, 2016)

=== Compilations in English ===
- Inventory: Essays by Michel Butor, edited by Richard Howard (Simon & Schuster, 1968; Cape, 1970). Twelve essays from Répertoire and Répertoire II, as well as five other pieces.
- Selected Essays, ed. Richard Skinner, trans. Mathilde Merouani (Vanguard Editions, 2022). Eight essays from Essais sur le roman.
