= Reading Writing =

1980 book by Julien Gracq

- First edition (French)
- Author: Julien Gracq
- Original title: En lisant en écrivant
- Translator: Jeanine Herman
- Publisher: José Corti
- Publication date: 1980
- English publication date: 2006
- Pages: 302
- ISBN: 9781933527024

Reading Writing (French: En lisant en écrivant) is a 1980 book by the French writer Julien Gracq. It consists of notes and fragments on the relation between reading and writing. An English translation by Jeanine Herman was published in 2006.

== Reception ==
Thomas McGonigle reviewed the book in Los Angeles Times in 2006 and wrote about Gracq: "He is singular in his literary accomplishments. His novels The Opposing Shore, A Dark Stranger and Balcony in the Forest remain as fresh, invigorating and moving as the day they were published." McGonigle continued about Reading Writing: "The scope of his interests and the intensity of his insight into the actual practice of writing are wonderful companions as one reads. Not only does Gracq refuse to consider writing and reading isolated from each other, but he also does not isolate them from arts such as music, painting, sculpture and film. ... The writer, student, teacher and reader are ever present in Gracq."
