= The Sunset Lands =

2014 novel by Julien Gracq

- Author: Julien Gracq
- Original title: Les Terres du couchant
- Translator: George MacLennan
- Language: French
- Publisher: Éditions Corti
- Publication date: 9 October 2014
- Publication place: France
- English publication date: April 2026
- Pages: 272
- ISBN: 978-2-7143-1133-7

The Sunset Lands (French: Les Terres du couchant) is a novel by the French writer Julien Gracq, written in 1953–1956 and published posthumously in 2014.

== Background ==
Julien Gracq worked on The Sunset Lands from 1953 to 1956, between his novels The Opposing Shore and Balcony in the Forest, but abandoned it. Gracq, who died in 2007, had expressed a wish that none of his unpublished material should be published until at least 20 years after his death.

== Plot ==
In an imaginary kingdom in a declining civilisation, it is taboo to discuss approaching barbarian invaders. People in the capital city Bréga-Vieil prefer to occupy themselves with complex legal arguments. A group of men secretly travel to the fortified city Roscharta at the edge of the kingdom, which already has been taken over by barbarians. The story is told through tableaux that describe locations and people in the kingdom, which has elements of several time periods and countries.

== Reception ==
Éditions Corti published The Sunset Lands on 9 October 2014. Eléonore Sulser of Le Temps wrote that it was written when Gracq was at the peak of his ability. She wrote that it is close to The Opposing Shore and Balcony in the Forest in "the atmosphere of war and waiting, a glistening, refined and sumptuous way of writing, rich in a shimmering vocabulary, which stretches itself in long breaths that are quiet and suddenly punctuated by accelerations as rare as they are sudden".
