= All Gall is Divided =

1952 philosophy book by Emil Cioran

All Gall Is Divided
- Author: Emil Cioran
- Translator: Richard Howard
- Language: French
- Genre: Philosophy
- Published: 1952 (French); 1999 (English)
- Publisher: Arcade Publishing
- Pages: 151
- Preceded by: A Short History of Decay
- Followed by: The Temptation to Exist

All Gall Is Divided (French: Syllogismes de l'amertume, literally "Syllogisms of Bitterness") is a French philosophical book by Emil Cioran. Originally published in 1952, it was translated into English in 1999 by Richard Howard. The book consists of aphorisms and brief remarks on subjects such as religion, suicide, and literature.

All Gall Is Divided was the second book to be written in French by the Romanian-born Cioran, after 1949's A Short History of Decay, and the first to contain aphorisms. Cioran claimed he adopted the aphorism because "explaining bores me terribly".

== Synopsis ==
The text is organized into ten chapters and bracketed into small fragments, either brief passages or aphoristic remarks, some consisting of a single sentence. (Note: In total, the work consists of 547 fragments, separated by bullets. Chapters 1 through 10 consist of 75, 65, 61, 33, 89, 47, 34, 19, 49 and 75 fragments, respectively.) This presentation contrasts with Cioran's previous work A Short History of Decay, which consisted of somewhat longer pieces: short reflections and small essays. In All Gall Is Divided, Cioran sought to develop his proficiency with French, expressing himself in concise fragments.

The book's original French title was Syllogismes de l'amerture (literally, Syllogisms of Bitterness), translated by Richard Howard as All Gall Is Divided. The original title refers both to the style of presentation and the negativity of the subject matter. The book's contents are not literal syllogisms but brief rhetorical flourishes, sometimes suggestive of an argument. Some items include one or two declarations, followed by a loosely related conclusion:

At the nadir of our failures, we suddenly grasp the essence of death; — a limit-perception, refractory to expression; a metaphysical defeat which words cannot perpetuate. This explains why, on this theme, the interjections of an illiterate old woman enlighten us more than a philosopher's jargon.

Howard's title translation was intended to retain the meaning of the original, while also loading other semantic meanings. According to Howard, Francis Bacon and other literary figures have noted that the aphoristic form itself implies a division, or break. Also, the English words "gall" and "bile" suggest negativity; as an anatomical fluid, the latter bile—itself associated with bitterness—is produced by the gallbladder. The literary meaning of "gall" compares with Baudelaire's sense of spleen, which refers to general disgust. Finally, the full (translated) title is a play on a quotation of Julius Caesar, which states that "All Gaul is divided into three parts". This reference to the ancient territory of France indicates Cioran's continuing use of the French language.

Unlike other of Cioran's previous works, All Gall Is Divided does not have a unifying theme, apart from its shorter aphoristic style. On the Heights of Despair had focused on negative emotions, Tears and Saints was devoted to the lives of Christian saints, and A Short History of Decay concentrated on the theme of decay, at both the individual and social level. All Gall Is Divided is instead a series of brief—and frequently negative—remarks on themes which are consistent throughout Cioran's work, such as history, love, and religion.

I love those nations of astronomers: Chaldeans, Assyrians, pre-Columbians who, for love of the sky, went bankrupt in history.

The more disabused a man's mind, the more he risks, stricken by love, reacting like a schoolgirl.

The Creation was the first act of sabotage.

The book contains several repetitions of ideas which Cioran had expressed in his earlier work. The above quotation about astronomers is a reworking of a similar passage found in his earlier Romanian work Tears and Saints. For Cioran, ancient astronomers who pass into obscurity are preferable to well-documented historical figures, because the latter frequently achieve their notability through warfare and atrocities. In Tears and Saints, Cioran's longer version of the passage continued, acknowledging both types of society:

A nation that loves neither the sky nor earthly conquests should not be allowed to live. There are only two ways to die right: on a battlefield or under the gaze of a star.

Another example of repetition is found in Cioran's disdain for the world. The conceit that the world "doesn't deserve to be known" is also found in On the Heights of Despair, his first book.

Objection to scientific knowledge: this world doesn't deserve to be known.

The final fragment of All Gall Is Divided is also an elaboration on an idea previously introduced in Tears and Saints. In the latter, Cioran introduced the idea of ancient Egyptian hermits who dig their own graves in the desert, in order to weep in them. In All Gall Is Divided Cioran updated the idea, indicating that he would not react to the situation with sadness, but instead wait to die in apathy.

When I was barely adolescent, the prospect of death flung me into trances; to escape them, I rushed to the brothel, where I invoked the angels. But with age, you become used to your own terrors, you undertake nothing more in order to be disengaged from them, you become quite bourgeois in the Abyss. — And although there was a time when I envied those Egyptian monks who dug their own graves in order to shed tears within them, if I were to dig mine now, all I would drop in there would be cigarette butts.

== Reception ==
Publishers Weekly called All Gall Is Divided Cioran's "existential equivalent" to The Devil's Dictionary, and described its writing as "aridly clever" and "laconic and intense". Patrick Madden noted that the aphorisms of All Gall Is Divided "drip with cynicism and despair", and described Cioran as an "irascible rascal, mischievously spreading his seeds of discord and discontent, but he does so so beautifully that a reader welcomes the fragmentary soliloquy between the pages, learns from it, changes from it."

In a 1999 New York Times review, Albert Mobilio praised the translation of All Gall Is Divided, comparing Cioran's idiosyncrasy to that of Cosmo Kramer. Mobilio stated that the "faux naif quality invests the act of dying with a slippery comedy that in true double-take fashion actually heightens the seriousness." In 2020, Mobilio published Same Faces, a collection of poems which was inspired by All Gall Is Divided.

All Gall Is Divided sold 2,000 copies within the first twenty years of its release, which Cioran called "a big success", and said it was his most read book in France.
