= Michel Murat =

Michel Murat is best known as a specialist of twentieth-century French literature, with an emphasis on modernity, style, poetics, and versification. He is also a specialist in surrealism. He has published several major studies of Julien Gracq's stylistics and poetics, in particular on the role of names and analogy in The Opposing Shore, as well as books on Robert Desnos and André Breton.
