= The Shape of a City =

- First edition
- Author: Julien Gracq
- Original title: La Forme d'une ville
- Translator: Ingeborg M. Kohn
- Publisher: José Corti
- Publication date: 1985
- English publication date: 2005
- Pages: 213
- ISBN: 9782714301062

The Shape of a City (French: La Forme d'une ville) is a 1985 book by the French writer Julien Gracq. It is a portrait of Nantes, the city where Gracq grew up, in the form of memories, anecdotes, reflections and dreamlike descriptions. The title comes from a quotation by Charles Baudelaire: "The shape of a city, as we all know, changes more quickly than the mortal heart". An English translation by Ingeborg M. Kohn was published in 2005.

== Reception ==
In 2007, Thomas McGonigle described the book for Los Angeles Times as "a model for how to write about one’s home place[.] ... It should be required reading for anyone setting out to describe their home place."
