= The Trouble with Being Born =

The Trouble with Being Born may refer to:

- The Trouble with Being Born (book), a 1973 work by Emil Cioran
- The Trouble with Being Born (film), a 2020 drama film by Sandra Wollner
