= The Narrow Waters =

Book about a tributary of the Loire, France

- First English edition
- Author: Julien Gracq
- Translator: Ingeborg M. Kohn
- Publisher: José Corti; Turtle Point Press (US)
- Publication date: 1976
- English publication date: 2004
- Pages: 74

The Narrow Waters (French: Les Eaux étroites) is a 1976 essay collection by the French writer Julien Gracq. The topic of the book is Èvre, a left tributary of the river Loire, located close to where the author grew up. The book was published by José Corti. An English translation by Ingeborg M. Kohn was published in 2004.

== Reception ==
Christine Thomas of SFGate wrote in 2004: "Gracq's literary associations abound, whether remarking that 'the deep black Evre resembled that bewitched ocean in "The Manuscript Found in a Bottle"' by Poe, or discussing a relation to Jules Verne's novel The House of Steam. He also alludes to Nerval, Balzac, Valery and even Chinese painting and the work of Vermeer. Short, willful and celebratory, this meditation on nature and intellect is both a beginning and ending, a contained image with many brilliant facets to be digested slowly and purposefully."
