= Un balcon en forêt (film) =

1978 film directed by Michel Mitrani

- Directed by: Michel Mitrani
- Screenplay by: Michel Mitrani
- Based on: Balcony in the Forest by Julien Gracq
- Starring: Humbert Balsan; Aïna Wallé; Yves Afonso; Jacques Charby; Serge Martina; Jacques Villeret
- Cinematography: Charly Gaeta
- Edited by: Claude Frechede
- Production company: Antenne 2
- Distributed by: Gaumont
- Release dates: May 1978 (Cannes); 28 February 1979
- Running time: 160 minutes
- Country: France
- Language: French

Un balcon en forêt (lit. 'A Balcony in [a] Forest') is a 1978 French war drama film directed by Michel Mitrani, starring Humbert Balsan, Aïna Wallé, Yves Afonso, Jacques Charby, Serge Martina and Jacques Villeret. It is set in a forest in the Ardennes in 1939, where a group of men occupy a concrete blockhouse in anticipation of an offence from the German army. It is based on the novel Balcony in the Forest by Julien Gracq and was produced by Antenne 2.

The film was in the Un Certain Regard selection at the 1978 Cannes Film Festival. It was released in French cinemas on 28 February 1979, distributed by Gaumont.
