= Argol =

Argol may refer to:

- Argol, Finistère, a commune on the Crozon peninsula in Finistère, Brittany, France
- Arghul, a woodwind musical instrument from the Middle East
- Potassium tartrate
- A character in the French comic book Welcome to Alflolol

== See also ==
- The Castle of Argol, a 1938 novel of Julien Gracq
