= La Presqu'île =

La Presqu’île
- First edition
- Author: Julien Gracq
- Language: French
- Genre: Novellas
- Publisher: José Corti
- Publication date: 1970
- Publication place: France
- Media type: Print

La Presqu’île (The Peninsula, 1970) is a collection of three short pieces by French writer Julien Gracq that takes its name from its second work, a novella, which is preceded by La Route and followed by Le Roi Cophetua (King Cophetua). The Peninsula and King Cophetua have been published separately in English by Green Integer (2011) and Turtle Point Press (2003), respectively. La Route has yet to be translated into English.

King Cophetua was the basis for the 1971 film Rendezvous at Bray, directed by André Delvaux.

== The Peninsula ==
Translated by Elizabeth Deshays, The Peninsula concerns the wanderings of a solitary man, Simon, on a day he spends driving around the Normandy coast. He spends his time exploring the area and revisiting the sites of childhood vacations while he waits for his mistress Irmgard to arrive at the train station later that evening. The story contains much highly descriptive and poetic detail of the area as Simon experiences it, woven together with his thoughts and sensations as they change throughout the day.

== King Cophetua ==
Translated by Ingeborg Kohn.
