= A Short History of Decay =

A Short History of Decay may refer to:

- A Short History of Decay (book), a 1949 book by philosopher Emil Cioran
- A Short History of Decay (film), 2012 American comedy film, not an adaptation of Cioran's book
