= History and Utopia =

1960 book by Emil Cioran

- Cover of the first edition
- Author: Emil Cioran
- Original title: Histoire et utopie
- Language: French
- Genre: Philosophy
- Publisher: Gallimard
- Publication date: 1960
- English publication date: 1987
- Preceded by: The Temptation to Exist
- Followed by: The Fall into Time

History and Utopia (French: Histoire et utopie) is a 1960 philosophical book by the Romanian philosopher Emil Cioran (1911–1995), which analyzes the ascendancy of the Soviet Union, the psychology of tyranny, and the historical concept of Utopia. The book also deals with several negative themes which permeate Cioran's work, including dissatisfaction with the world, the importance of negative emotions, and philosophical pessimism.

Born in Romania, Cioran wrote several early philosophical works in his native Romanian language. As a young man Cioran sympathized with the Iron Guard, a Romanian fascist movement. This prompted him to write The Transfiguration of Romania (1936–7), a work which argued for the installation of a totalitarian government in Romania. In 1937 Cioran relocated to Paris, where he would remain for the rest of his life. This move marked a clear break in Cioran's life, dividing his work into an early Romanian period and a mature French period. Following the conclusion of World War II, Cioran disowned The Transfiguration of Romania and began to publish works in French, the language in which he wrote for the remainder of his life. History and Utopia was published in 1960, toward the middle of Cioran's French period.

History and Utopia is a collection of essays, one of which ("Letter to a Faraway Friend") was addressed to the philosopher Constantin Noica. Noica, a friend of Cioran's, remained in Romania and had also been sympathetic to the Iron Guard during the war. The appearance of the essay led to Noica's conviction for charges as a political prisoner, within the post-war, communist Romania.

== Synopsis ==
History and Utopia is a collection of six essays. The first, "Letter to a Faraway Friend", was written in the context of the Hungarian Revolution of 1956 and addressed to the philosopher Constantin Noica, a contemporary of Cioran's. In their youth, both Cioran and Noica had been sympathetic to the Iron Guard, a fascist movement which briefly seized control of Romania during World War II. The Iron Guard's brief reign was succeeded by several regime changes until the Socialist Republic of Romania—a Soviet-backed communist government—was installed in 1947. In 1937 Cioran had relocated to Paris, where he would remain for the rest of his life. Noica, on the other hand, was held in Romania as a political prisoner following the war. (Note: Although the young Cioran expressed sympathy for the Iron Guard and fascism in general, his involvement with the movement was indirect and largely confined to his writings. In contrast, Noica was more directly involved, having become a card-carrying member at the relatively late date of 1938.) In the letter, Cioran expressed ambivalence about the relative freedom that he enjoyed in Paris while Noica was a political prisoner in Romania:

From that country which was ours and now is no one's, you urge me, after so many years of silence, to send you details about my occupations, and about this "wonderful" world in which, you say, I am lucky enough to live and move and have my being... The difference between regimes is less important than it appears; you are alone by force, we without constraint. Is the gap so wide between an inferno and a ravaging paradise? All societies are bad; but there are degrees, I admit, and if I have chosen this one, it is because I can distinguish among the nuances of trumpery. Freedom, as I was saying, demands, in order to manifest itself, a vacuum; it requires a void—and succumbs to it. The condition that determines it is the very one that annihilates it. It lacks foundations; the more complete it is, the more it overhangs an abyss, for everything threatens it, down to the principle from which it derives.

Cioran also recalled his childhood fear of the Hungarian police, and commented on the national character of the Russian people, which he likened to a force of nature, as opposed to a collective human will.

To the question you ask: "Do you still harbor your old prejudices against our little neighbor to the west, do you still resent her as much?" I don't know what answer to give; at best I can dumbfound or disappoint you. Because, of course, we do not have the same experience of Hungary. Born beyond the Carpathians, you could not know the Hungarian policeman, terror of my Transylvanian childhood. When I so much as glimpsed one from afar, I was panic-stricken and ran away: he was the alien, the enemy; to hate was to hate him. Because of him, I abhorred all Hungarians with a truly Magyar passion.

The feelings the West inspires in me are no less mixed than those I entertain toward my country, toward Hungary, or toward our big neighbor, whose indiscreet proximity you are in a better position to appreciate than I... I find that Russia has formed herself, down through the ages, not the way a nation is formed, but the way a universe is formed... Those tsars with their look of dried-up divinities, giants solicited by sanctity and crime, collapsing into prayer and panic—they were, as are these recent tyrants who have replaced them, closer to a geological vitality than to human anemia... triumphing over us all by their inexhaustible reserves of chaos.

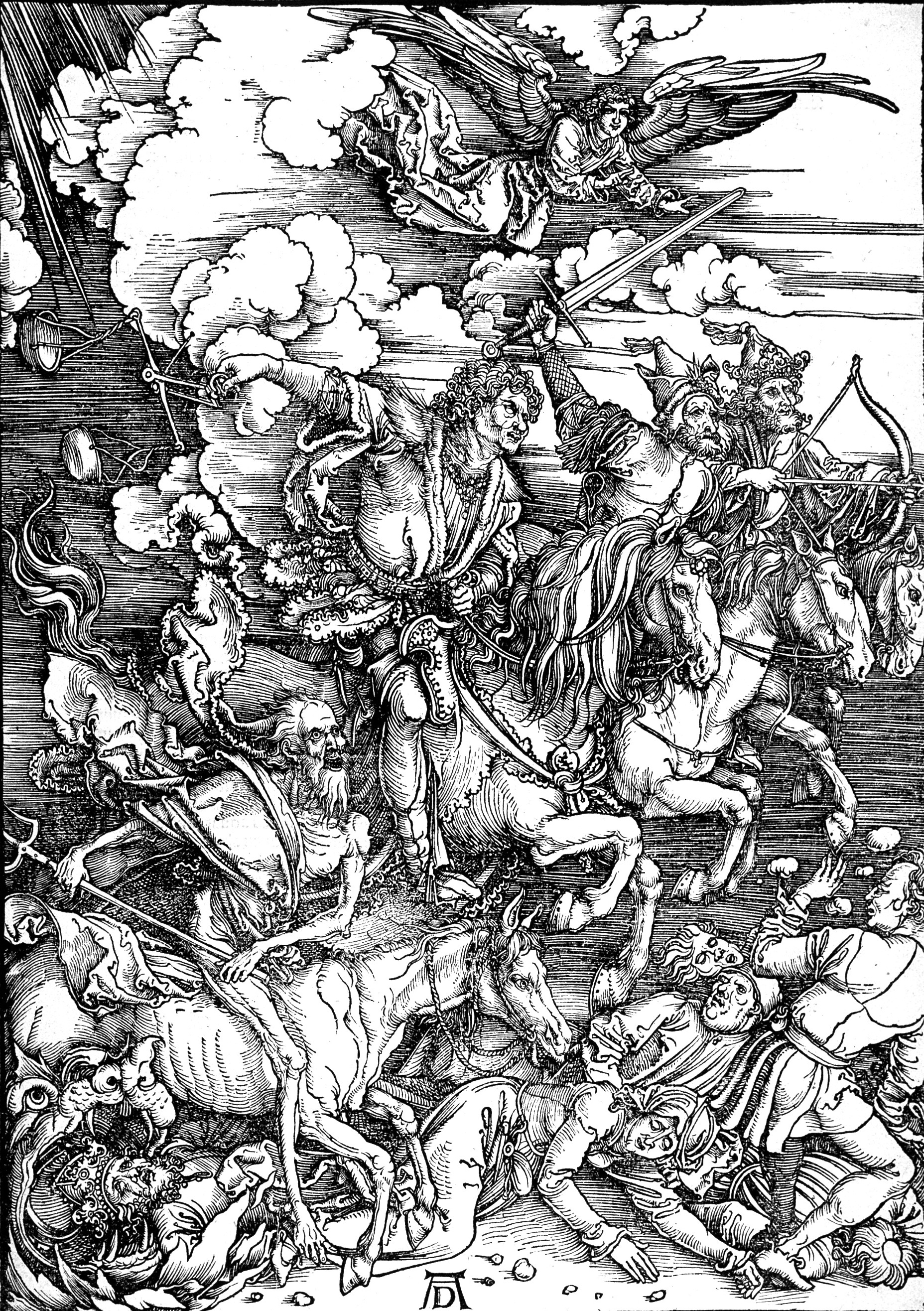
Cioran cited Dürer's Four Horsemen of the Apocalypse as an illustration of the cruelty which humans inflict on each other throughout history.

The second essay, "Russia and the Virus of Liberty", is a continuation on the theme of Russian history, from its tsarist past through its then-communist present. As one example, Cioran noted that the culture of Orthodox Christianity distinguished Russia from the rest of Europe: "By adopting Orthodoxy, Russia manifested her desire to stand apart from the West; it was her way of defining herself, from the start." The third essay, "Learning from the Tyrants", is a rhetorical analysis of the phenomena which give rise to authoritarianism and the personal psychology of tyrants or dictators. According to Cioran, most people aspire to power, and those who do not are abnormal. For Cioran, a major element of the tyrant's psychology is a solitary nature, in which although the tyrant necessarily interacts with others, he keeps his plans to himself, possibly with the view of eliminating friends who may challenge his power:

Caesar's great mistake was not to distrust his own people... Were I to seize power, my first concern would be to do away with all my friends. Any other way of going about it would spoil the métier, would discredit tyranny. Hitler, quite competent in this instance, displayed great wisdom by getting rid of Roehm, the only man he addressed in the second person singular, and of a good number of his early companions. Stalin, for his part, was no less equal to the task, as the Moscow Purges testify.

Despite their violence, Cioran prefers tyrants to spiritual leaders, because (according to Cioran) while the former can be arbitrary and unprincipled, they are at least honest in their desire for domination and do not justify their actions in terms of religious doctrine, which Cioran regards as dishonest. Further, tyrants make history an interesting subject of study:

I harbor a weakness for tyrants, whom I always prefer to redeemers and prophets; I prefer them because they do not take refuge in formulas... A world without tyrants would be as boring as a zoo without hyenas.

The fourth essay, "Odyssey of Rancor", asserts the central importance of negative emotions in motivating human behavior (e.g. to triumph over an adversary, to take revenge, or to produce a superior work of art):

Action's sovereignty comes, let us admit it straight off, from our vices, which master a greater contingent of existence than our virtues possess... We invariably produce and perform better out of jealousy and greed than out of nobility and disinterestedness... Every conviction consists chiefly of hate, and only secondly of love.

In the fifth essay, "Mechanism of Utopia", Cioran reviews classical utopian literary works (e.g. the works of Cabet and Fourier), pronouncing them to be naive. He also identifies the ancient conception of utopia as a bygone state which existed in the distant past, while for moderns the ideal of utopia is something to be striven for in the future. In the sixth and final essay "The Golden Age", Cioran considers the classical notion of a Golden Age, an ancient period of happiness described by Hesiod which was followed by worsening periods (e.g. the Bronze Age and the Iron Age). In closing, Cioran explicitly rejects the possibility of any utopia:

Harmony, universal or otherwise, has never existed and never will exist. As for justice, in order to believe it possible, in order even to imagine it, we must have the advantage of a supernatural talent for blindness, of an unprecedented election, a divine grace reinforced by a diabolic one, and count, further, on an effort of generosity from heaven and hell alike, an effort, in truth, highly improbable on the one side as on the other.

== Reception ==
Cioran originally published "Letter to a Faraway Friend" as an open letter in Nouvelle Revue Française. Copies of the letter circulated in Romanian intellectual circles, where it was received with resentment because Cioran wrote freely from Paris while the Romanians, under communist rule, were unable to make "a free response". The letter and other writings of Cioran's were later used as evidence to convict Noica and others for (other, harsher) political prisoner charges. Cioran expressed regret that the letter intended for his friend had become "a weapon to be used against him".

A book review described History and Utopia's English translation as "a compelling yet profoundly troubling work. In the flow of Cioran's impassioned writing, it is too easy to overlook his flawed conclusions and the near-mockery he makes of historical analysis."

Throughout his career, Cioran usually expressed himself in essays, aphorisms, and other fragmentary writings, intentionally avoiding the development of a philosophical system. Biographer Marta Petreu identified his early political work The Transfiguration of Romania as an exception, calling it his only "systematic work". Although Cioran later disowned the Transfiguration over its sympathies with fascism and totalitarianism, Eugene Thacker pointed out that it was not his only political work, noting that History and Utopia was also a collection of writings dealing with politics in a concrete way.

== Bibliography ==
- Cioran, Emil (1987) [Originally published in 1960]. History and Utopia. Translated by Howard, Richard. Arcade. ISBN 9781628724257. Foreword by Thacker, Eugene.

== Sources ==
- Petreu, Marta (2005). An Infamous Past: E.M. Cioran and the Rise of Fascism in Romania. Ivan R. Dee. ISBN 9781566636070.
