= Daniel Rondeau =

French writer

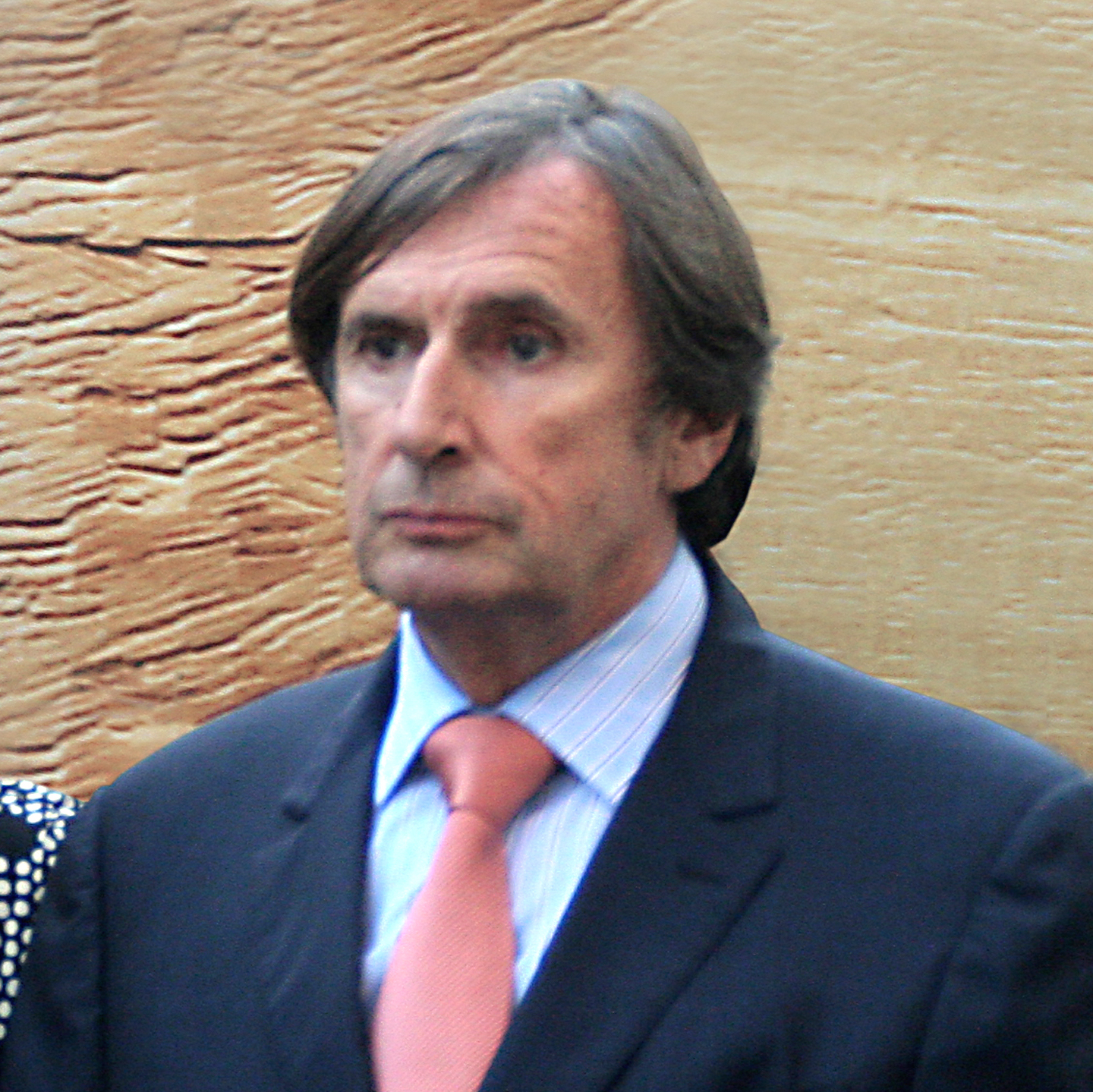
- Daniel Rondeau in 2010
- Born: 7 May 1948 (age 78); Le Mesnil-sur-Oger, France
- Education: Panthéon-Assas University
- Occupations: Writer; Journalist; Diplomat
- Known for: Member of the Académie Française

Daniel Rondeau (French pronunciation: [danjɛl ʁɔ̃do]; born 7 May 1948) is a French writer, editor, and diplomat. Born in Le Mesnil-sur-Oger, he studied law at Panthéon-Assas where the spirit of May 68 saw him embrace Maoism and join the proletariat by working from 1970 to 1974 in a factory in Nancy making insulation. He worked for France Inter's Nord-Est radio station from 1977, before moving to Paris, where he worked for the newspapers Libération (1982–1985) Le Nouvel Observateur (1985–1998) and L'Express (1998–2007). He was French ambassador to Malta (2008–2011) and to UNESCO (2011–2013). He has written fiction, reportage, literary criticism and political commentary, and for his oeuvre won the Grand prix de littérature Paul-Morand in 1998. After unsuccessfully standing for election to the Académie Française in 2011 and 2016, he was elected to seat 8 in 2019.

== Works ==
Works by Daniel Rondeau
Title	Date	Notes
Chagrin lorrain	1979	Account of deindustrialisation in Lorraine
L'Âge-Déraison, véritable biographie imaginaire de Johnny H	1982	Fictional biography of his friend Johnny Hallyday
Trans-Europ-Express	1984	Anthology of Libération reportage
Tanger	1987	Travelogue of Tangiers.
L'enthousiasme	1988	Memoir of his time as a factory worker in Lorraine. Revised edition in 2006 was the second volume of his autobiography, Mémoire tu l'appelleras
Pourquoi écrivez vous?	1988	Co-editor with Jean-François Fogel of an anthology of writers explaining their motivations.
Les Tambours du Monde	1989	Novel
Chronique du Liban rebelle 1988–1989	1991	Account of his friend Michel Aoun's interim premiership at the end of the Lebanese Civil War.
Portraits champenois	1991	Account of his home region of Champagne, with photographs by his brother Gérard Rondeau
La Part du diable	1992	Novel
Littérature notre ciel!	1992	Account of Heinrich Maria Ledig-Rowohlt
Les Fêtes partagées; Lectures et autres voyages	1994	Literary anthology
Mitterrand et nous	1994	Account of the presidency of François Mitterrand
Des hommes libres; La France libre par ceux qui l’ont faite	1997	Co-editor with Roger Stéphane of accounts by Free French resistance members
Alexandrie	1997	Travelogue of Alexandria. Winner of the 1998 Prix des Deux Magots
Johnny	1999	Anthology of journalistic interviews and portraits of Johnny Hallyday. Second edition 2009.
Istanbul	2002	Travelogue of Istanbul.
Dans la marche du temps	2004	Novel
Camus ou les promesses de la vie	2005	Account of Albert Camus' life and work
Les vignes de Berlin	2006	First volume of his autobiography, Mémoire tu l'appelleras
Journal de lectures, 1999–2006	2007	Anthology of literary articles from L'Express
Carthage	2008	Travelogue and meditation on the ruins and history of Carthage
Malta Hanina	2012	Account of Malta
Vingt ans et plus	2014	Excerpts from his 1991–2012 diaries. Winner of the Prix Saint-Simon
Boxing-Club	2016	Essays on boxing
Mécaniques du chaos	2017	Novel. Winner of the Grand Prix du roman de l'Académie française
La raison et le cœur	2018	Anthology of political and literary pieces written since 1984, some previously unpublished.
Arrière-pays	2021	Novel

== Honours ==
French

- Chevalier of the Legion of Honour
- Commander of the Ordre des Arts et des Lettres
- Chevalier of the Ordre du Mérite Maritime

Foreign (honorary)

- Officer of the National Order of Merit (Malta)
- Commander of the National Order of the Cedar (Lebanon)
