= Hothouses =

- The cover of the English-language version of Maurice Maeterlinck's Serres chaudes, translated as Hothouses.
- Author: Maurice Maeterlinck
- Original title: Serres chaudes
- Translator: Richard Howard
- Illustrator: Georges Minne
- Cover artist: Lisa Clark
- Language: French
- Genre: Poetry
- Publisher: Vanier
- Publication date: 1889
- Publication place: Belgium
- English publication date: 2003
- Pages: Approx. 108
- ISBN: 0-691-08837-3 (Hardcover); ISBN 0-691-08838-1 (Paperback)
- OCLC: 50684474
- Dewey Decimal: 841/.8 21
- LC Class: PQ2625.A45 S513 2003

Hothouses (or Hot House Blooms, French: Serres chaudes) (1889) is a book of symbolist poetry by the Belgian Nobel laureate Maurice Maeterlinck. Most of the poems in this collection are written in octosyllabic verse, but some are in free verse.

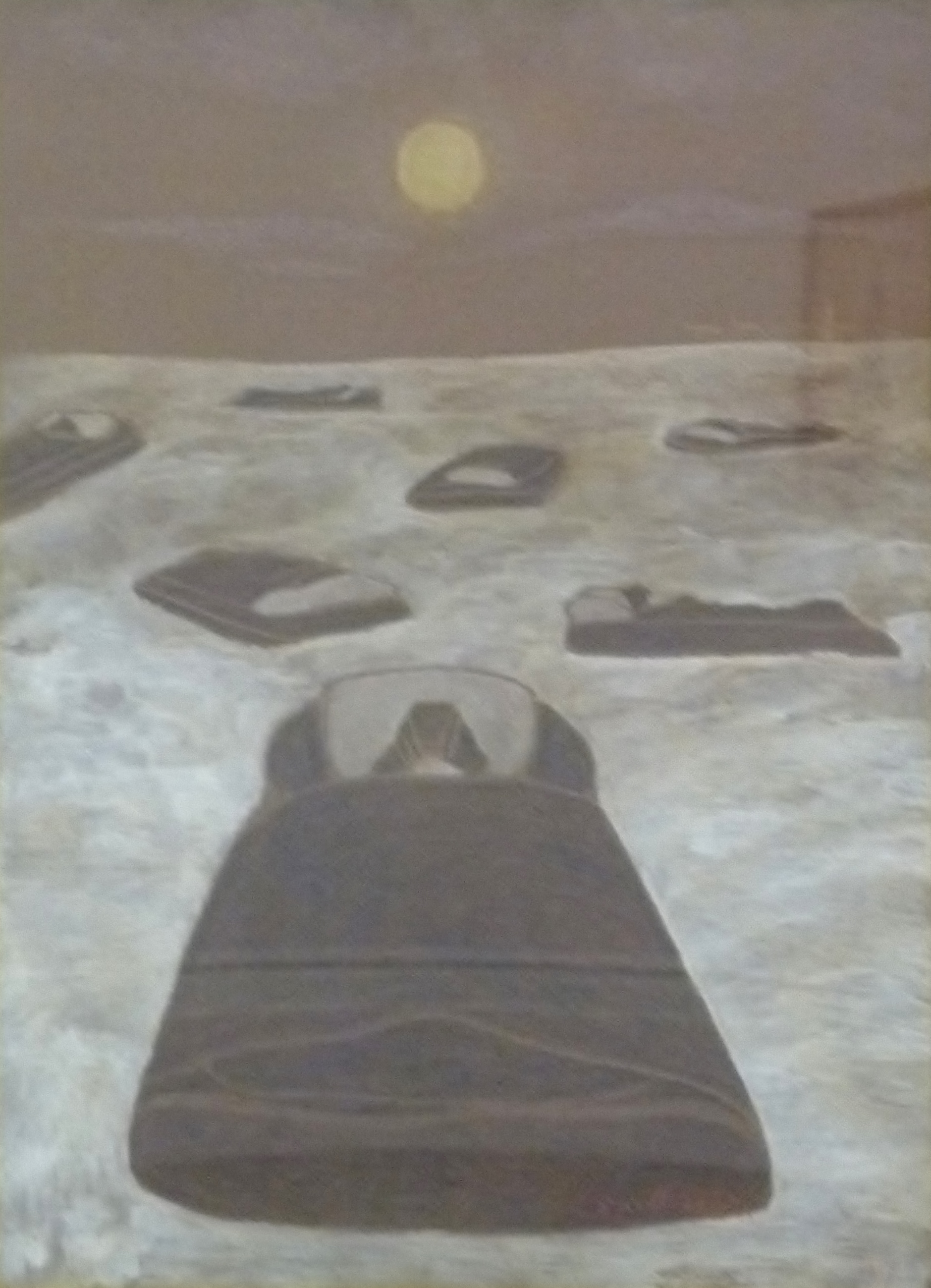
"Serres Chaudes" (1917), illustration by the Belgian artist Léon Spilliaert

== Poems ==
1. "Serre chaude"
2. "Oraison (I)"
3. "Serre d'ennui"
4. "Tentations"
5. "Cloches de verre"
6. "Offrande obscure"
7. "Feuillage du cœur"
8. "Âme chaude"
9. "Âme"
10. "Lassitude"
11. "Chasses lasses"
12. "Fauves las"
13. "Oraison (II)"
14. "Heures ternes"
15. "Ennui"
16. "Hôpital"
17. "Oraison nocturne"
18. "Désirs d'hiver"
19. "Ronde d'ennui"
20. "Amen"
21. "Cloche à plongeur"
22. "Aquarium"
23. "Verre ardent"
24. "Reflets"
25. "Visions"
26. "Oraison (III)"
27. "Regards"
28. "Attente"
29. "Après-midi"
30. "Âme de serre"
31. "Intentions"
32. "Attouchements"
33. "Âme de nuit"

== English translations ==
Serres chaudes has been translated into English by Richard Howard. This edition, published by Princeton University Press also contains a short prose work, The Massacre of the Innocents, inspired by a Brueghel painting of the same name, as well as illustrations by George Minne that appeared in the original volume.

== Musical adaptations ==
"Serre chaude," "Serre d'ennui," "Lassitude," "Fauves las," and "Oraison" were all set to music by French composer Ernest Chausson. "Feuillage du cœur" was set to music by Arnold Schoenberg under the name Herzgewächse and by the Belgian composer Serge Verstockt (original title).
