= On the Heights of Despair =

1934 philosophical book by Emil Cioran

On The Heights of Despair
- Author: Emil Cioran
- Translator: Ilinca Zarifopol-Johnston
- Language: Romanian
- Genre: Philosophy
- Publication date: 1934
- Publication place: Romania
- English publication date: 1992
- Pages: 156
- Awards: King Carol II Foundation's Young Writer's Prize
- ISBN: 9780226106717
- Followed by: The Book of Delusions

On the Heights of Despair (Romanian: Pe culmile disperării) is a Romanian philosophical work written by Emil Cioran, published in 1934 as his first book. It consists of several brief reflections on negative themes which later permeated Cioran's work, such as death, insomnia and insanity.

It was one of several works that Cioran wrote in his native Romanian language. In 1937, Cioran left Romania and relocated to Paris, where he lived for the rest of his life. This break marked two definite periods in Cioran's life and work: an early Romanian period, and a later, mature French period. Cioran later published several works in French, which brought him to wider attention.

On the Heights of Despair received a young authors' prize, established by the King Carol II Foundation for Art and Literature. Cioran's later works received other awards, including the Prix Rogier Namier and the Grand prix de littérature Paul-Morand, although Cioran declined both. In 1992, On the Heights of Despair was translated into English by Ilinca Zarifopol-Johnston.

== Synopsis ==
The text consists of 66 brief titled sections, usually ranging in length from one to three pages. In each section, Cioran considers certain emotions or psychological states, contrasting them with each other. He focuses on negative emotions, such as sadness, melancholy, and agony. For Cioran, while sadness itself is an acute emotion which may follow moments of happiness, melancholy is a more diffuse form of sadness, associated with regret and ambiguity.

Cioran praises lyricism and heightened emotional states for their ability to force humans to reconsider the truly important categories of the human condition, such as love and death. Humans may ignore such categories for several years by focusing on the routines of everyday life, or by participating in rational or intellectual endeavors. Cioran scorns the latter categories:

There is value only in that which bursts forth from inspiration, which springs up from the irrational depths of our being, from the secret center of our subjectivity. The fruit of labor, effort and endeavor has no value, and the offspring of intelligence is sterile and uninteresting. I delight in the barbaric and spontaneous élan of inspiration, effervescent spiritual states, essential lyricism, and inner tension—these things make inspiration the only reality of creation.

Throughout the text, Cioran also expresses anti-rationalist and anti-Christian views:

Man should stop being—or becoming—a rational animal. He should become a lunatic, risking everything for the sake of his dangerous fantasies, capable of exaltations, ready to die for all that the world has as well as what it has not.

I hate Jesus for his preachings, his morality, his ideas, and his faith. I love him for his moments of doubt and regret, the only truly tragic ones in his life, though neither the most interesting nor the most painful, for if we had to judge from their suffering, how many before him would also be entitled to call themselves sons of God!

Although Cioran focuses on negative emotions and gives contrarian opinions, he also considers certain positive emotions and expresses more conventional views rejecting certain negative states, although these rejections have an anti-Christian content. Innocence and grace are described as positive states, although Cioran's grace is more secular and aesthetic, as opposed to the religious sense of the English word. Although he praises the heightened emotions which suffering can induce, Cioran explicitly rejects poverty and suffering themselves as purely destructive states which have none of the nobility or catharsis which Christianity confers upon them.

Poverty destroys everything in life; it makes it ghastly, disgusting... The convulsions of poverty bear no trace of purification; they are all hatred, bitterness, and flesh gone evil. Poverty does not engender a pure, angelic soul or an immaculate humility any more than sickness does; its humility is venomous, evil, and vengeful.

Although suffering moves me and sometimes even delights me, never could I write the apologia of suffering, because long-lasting suffering—and all genuine suffering is long-lasting—though purifying in its first phases, unhinges the reason, dulls the senses, and finally destroys.

== Background ==
On the Heights of Despair was written in a bout of depression and insomnia, conditions from which Cioran suffered throughout his life: "I've never been able to write otherwise than in the midst of the depression brought about by my nights of insomnia. For seven years I could barely sleep. I need this depression, and even today before I sit down to write I play a disk of Gypsy music from Hungary." The book's title derives from a phrase that was commonly used in Romanian newspapers of the period to begin the obituaries of suicides, e.g. "On the heights of despair, young so-and-so took his life...".

At the time of writing On the Heights of Despair, Cioran was sympathetic to Nazism. He expressed support for the Night of the Long Knives, which occurred in the same year that the book was published. Despite this, On the Heights of Despair expresses attitudes which are contrary to Nazi philosophy.

The cover of the book's English edition is a detail of the Temptation of Saint Anthony, as painted on the Isenheim Altarpiece by Matthias Grünewald. The image depicts monstrous demons who are attacking the saint.

== Reception ==
On the Heights of Despair was noted for its elaborate prose, aphorisms and philosophical pessimism, expressed in a style that Cioran would later be recognised for. Speaking on Cioran in general terms, Saint-John Perse described him as "the greatest French writer to honour our language since the death of Paul Valéry."

Although Cioran gained a following among French intellectuals during his later years, the response to his early work in his home country of Romania was overwhelmingly negative. Cioran's father was a priest, and his mother was head of a local Christian Women's League. The blasphemous nature of Cioran's work forced his parents to maintain a low profile. His mother once said that if she had known how miserable he would become, she would have aborted him, a statement which Cioran described as "liberating". Despite this, she still read his works, whereas his father refused, because of his profession: "Everything that I wrote bothered him and he didn't know how to react. But my mother understood me." Cioran's works were banned under the rule of Nicolae Ceaușescu.

== See also ==
- The Trouble with Being Born
- Peter Wessel Zapffe
- The Conspiracy Against the Human Race
