= Emil Cioran =

Romanian philosopher, aphorist, and essayist (1911–1995)

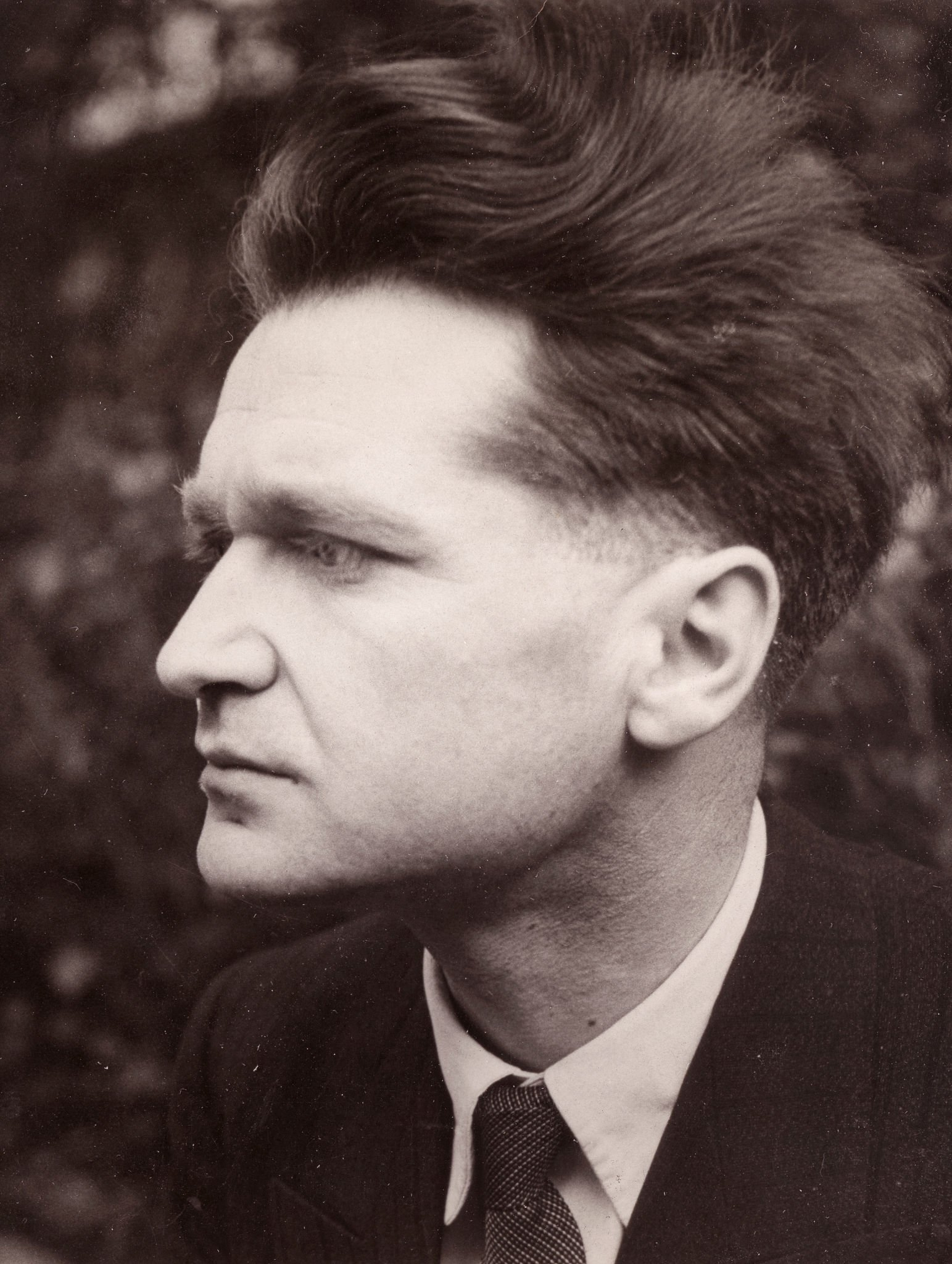
- Cioran in Romania, c. 1940s
- Born: Emil Mihai Cioran; 8 April 1911; Resinár, Austria-Hungary (modern-day Rășinari, Transylvania, Romania)
- Died: 20 June 1995 (aged 84); Paris, France
- Resting place: Montparnasse Cemetery, Paris
- Partner: Simone Boué
- Awards: King Carol II Foundation Young Writer's Prize; Prix Rivarol; Prix Rogier Namier (refused); Grand prix de littérature Paul-Morand (refused)

Education
- Education: University of Bucharest; University of Berlin
- Academic advisors: Nae Ionescu; Tudor Vianu

Philosophical work
- Era: Contemporary philosophy
- Region: Western philosophy; Romanian philosophy; French philosophy
- School: Continental philosophy; Philosophical pessimism; Existentialism
- Main interests: Aesthetics, antinatalism, ethics, hagiography, literary criticism, music, nihilism, poetry, religion, suicide, suffering

Emil Mihai Cioran (/ˈtʃɔːrɑːn/; Romanian: [eˈmil tʃoˈran]; French: [emil sjɔʁɑ̃]; 8 April 1911 – 20 June 1995) was a Romanian philosopher, aphorist, and essayist who published works in both Romanian and French. His work has been noted for its pervasive philosophical pessimism, style, and aphorisms. His works frequently engaged with issues of suffering, decay, nihilism, and antinatalism. In 1937, Cioran moved to the Latin Quarter of Paris, which became his permanent residence, wherein he lived in seclusion with his partner, Simone Boué, until his death in 1995.

== Early life ==
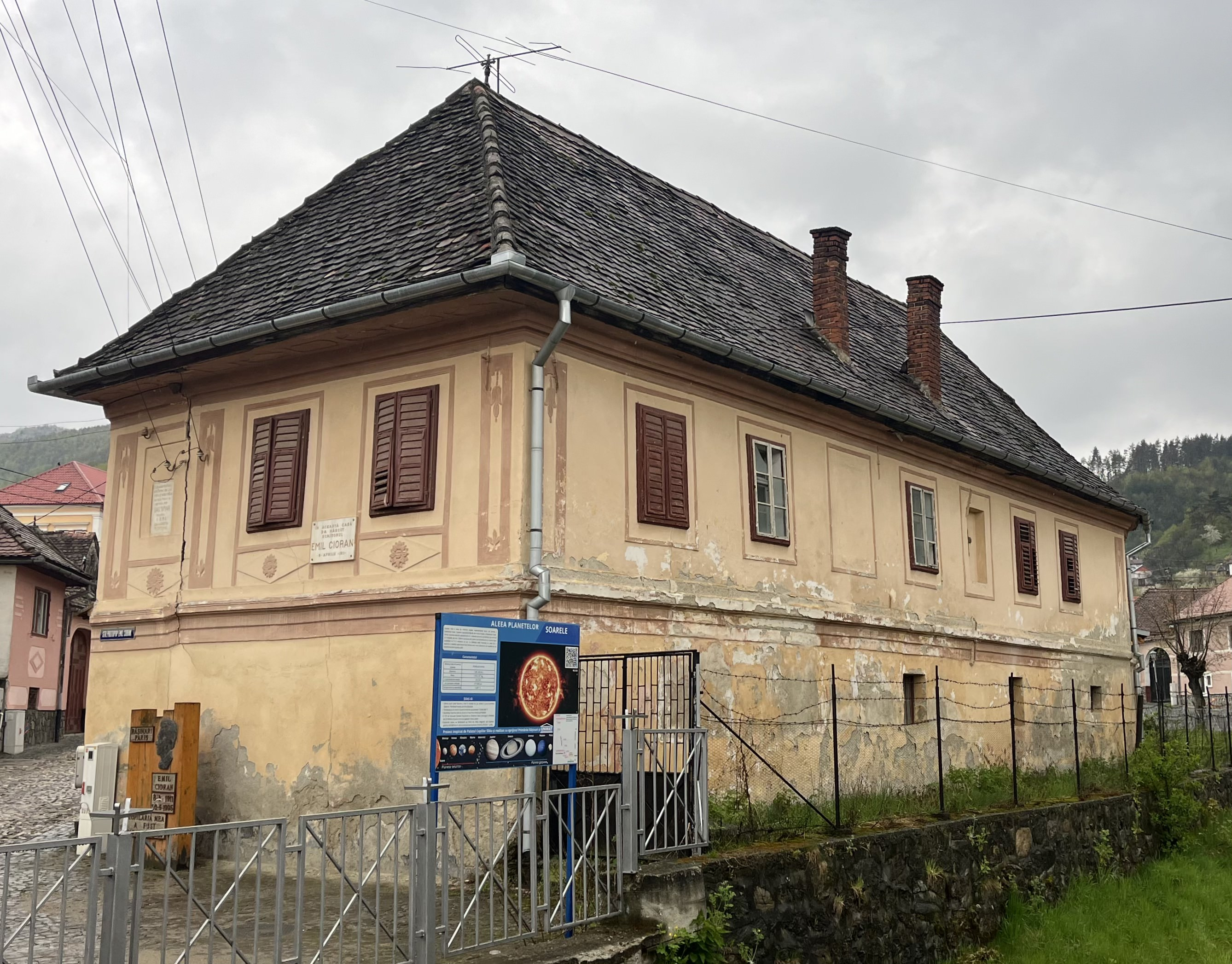
Cioran's birthplace (today Rășinari, Sibiu County, Romania)

Cioran was born in Resinár, Szeben County, Kingdom of Hungary (today Rășinari, Sibiu County, Romania). His father, Emilian Cioran, was an Orthodox priest, and his mother, Elvira, was the head of the Christian Women's League.

At 10, Cioran moved to Sibiu to attend school, and at 17, he was enrolled in the Faculty of Literature and Philosophy at the University of Bucharest, where he met Eugène Ionesco and Mircea Eliade, who became his friends. Future Romanian philosopher Constantin Noica and future Romanian thinker Petre Țuțea became his closest academic colleagues; all three studied under Nae Ionescu and Tudor Vianu. Cioran, Eliade, and Țuțea became supporters of Ionescu's ideas, known as Trăirism.

Cioran learned German at a young age. This lead him to read German philosophy that was unavailable in Romanian. Cioran's studied Friedrich Nietzsche in his adolescence as well as Honoré de Balzac, Arthur Schopenhauer, and Fyodor Dostoevsky, among others.

While at the university, he was influenced by Georg Simmel, Ludwig Klages and Martin Heidegger, but also by the Russian philosopher Lev Shestov. Shestov contributed to Cioran's central system of thought that life is arbitrary. Cioran's graduation thesis was on Henri Bergson, whom he later rejected, claiming Bergson did not comprehend the tragedy of life. He became an agnostic and took the axiom "the inconvenience of existence".

From the age of 20, Cioran began to suffer from insomnia, a condition from which he suffered for the rest of his life, and permeated his writings. Cioran's decision to write about his experiences in his first book, On the Heights of Despair, came aftern an episode of insomnia.

== Career ==
=== In Berlin and Romania ===
In 1933, Cioran received a scholarship to the University of Berlin, where he studied Johann Gottlieb Fichte, Hegel, Edmund Husserl, Immanuel Kant, Georg Simmel, Schopenhauer, and Nietzsche. There, he came into contact with Klages and Nicolai Hartmann. While in Berlin, he became interested in the policies of the Nazi regime, contributed a column to the Romanian periodical Vremea dealing with the topic (in which Cioran confessed that "there is no present-day politician that I see as more sympathetic and admirable than Hitler", while expressing his approval for the Night of the Long Knives—"what has humanity lost if the lives of a few imbeciles were taken"), and, in a letter written to Petru Comarnescu, described himself as "a Hitlerist". He held similar views about Italian fascism, welcoming victories in the Second Italo-Abyssinian War, arguing that: "Fascism is a shock, without which Italy is a compromise comparable to today's Romania".

Cioran's first book, Pe culmile disperării (literally translated: "On the Heights of Despair"), was published in Romania in 1934. It was awarded the Commission's Prize and the Young Writers Prize for one of the best books written by an unpublished young writer. Regardless, Cioran later spoke negatively of it, saying "it is a very poorly written book, without any style." Successively, The Book of Delusions (1935), The Transfiguration of Romania (1936) and Tears and Saints (1937) were also published in Romania. Tears and Saints was "incredibly poorly received", and after it was published, Cioran's mother wrote him asking him to retract the book because it was causing her public embarrassment.

Although Cioran was never a member of the group, it was during this time in Romania that he began taking an interest in the ideas put forth by the Iron Guard—a far-right organization whose nationalist ideology he supported until the early years of World War II, despite allegedly disapproving of their violent methods. Cioran would later denounce fascism, describing it in 1970 as "the worst folly of my youth. If I am cured of one sickness, it is surely that one."

The Transfiguration of Romania was praised by the leader of the Iron Guard, Corneliu Zelea Codreanu, who congratulated Cioran on its publication in a personal letter.

Cioran revised The Transfiguration of Romania heavily in its second edition released in the 1990s, eliminating numerous passages he considered extremist or "pretentious and stupid". In its original form, the book expressed sympathy for totalitarianism, a view that was also present in various articles Cioran wrote at the time, and that aimed to establish "urbanization and industrialization" as "the two obsessions of a rising people".

His early call for modernization was, however, hard to reconcile with the traditionalism of the Iron Guard. In 1934, he wrote, "I find that in Romania the sole fertile, creative, and invigorating nationalism can only be one which does not just dismiss tradition, but also denies and defeats it". Disapproval of what he viewed as specifically Romanian traits had been present in his works ("In any maxim, in any proverb, in any reflection, our people expresses the same shyness in front of life, the same hesitation and resignation... [...] Everyday Romanian [truisms] are dumbfounding."), which led to criticism from the far-right Gândirea (its editor, Nichifor Crainic, had called The Transfiguration of Romania "a bloody, merciless, massacre of today's Romania, without even [the fear] of matricide and sacrilege"), as well as from various Iron Guard papers.

=== In France ===
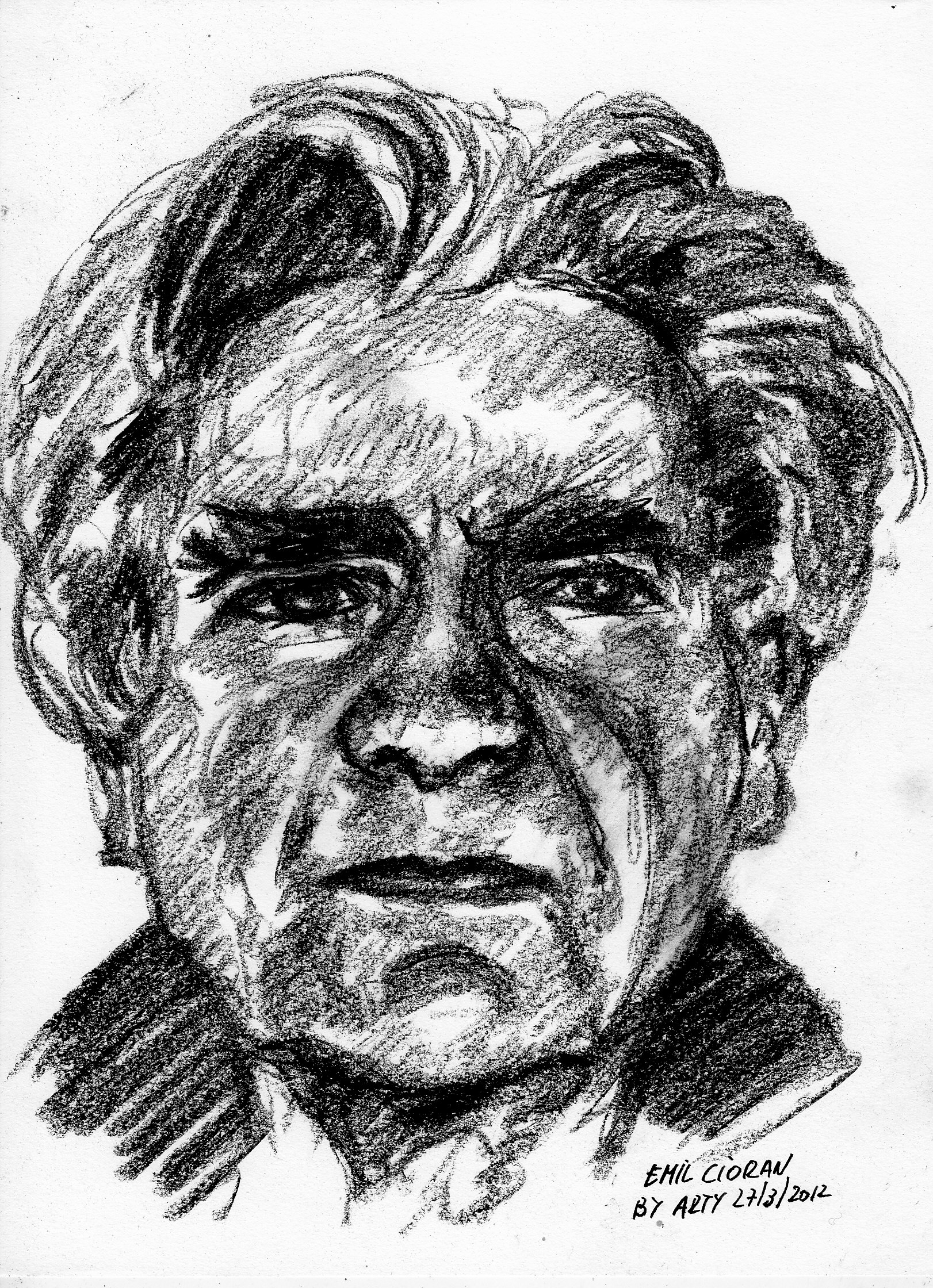
Portrait of Cioran

After returning from Berlin in 1936, Cioran taught philosophy at the Andrei Șaguna High School in Brașov for a year. His classes were marked by confusion and he quit in a year.

In 1937, he first applied for a fellowship at the Spanish Embassy in Bucharest but then the Spanish Civil War started. Then he left for Paris with a scholarship from the French Institute branch in Bucharest, which was then prolonged until 1944. He was supposedly working towards a doctoral thesis in the Sorbonne University, but he had no intention to actually work towards it, as the identity of being a student gave him access to cheap meals at the university cafeteria. This he continued until 1951 when a law passed that forbade enrollment of students older than 27.

After a short stay in his home country (November 1940 – February 1941), Cioran never returned again. This last period in Romania was the one in which he exhibited a closer relationship with the Iron Guard, which by then had taken power (see National Legionary State). On 28 November, for the state-owned Romanian Radio, Cioran recorded a speech centered on the portrait of Corneliu Zelea Codreanu, former leader of the movement, praising him and the Guard for, among other things, "having given Romanians a purpose".

He later renounced not only his support for the Iron Guard, but also their nationalist ideas, and frequently expressed regret and repentance for his emotional implication in it. For example, in a 1972 interview, he condemned it as "a complex of movements; more than this, a demented sect and a party", saying, "I found out then [...] what it means to be carried by the wave without the faintest trace of conviction. [...] I am now immune to it".

Cioran started writing The Passionate Handbook in 1940 and finished it by 1945. It was the last book he wrote in Romanian, though not the last to deal with pessimism and misanthropy through lyrical aphorisms. Cioran published books only in French thereafter. It was at this point that Cioran's apparent contempt for the Romanian people emerged. He told a friend that he "wanted to write a Philosophy of Failure, with the subtitle For the exclusive use of the Romanian People". Furthermore, he described his move to Paris as "by far the most intelligent thing" he had ever done, and in The Trouble with Being Born says "In continual rebellion against my ancestry, I have spent my whole life wanting to be something else: Spanish, Russian, cannibal—anything, except what I was."

In 1942, Cioran met Simone Boué, another insomniac, with whom he lived for the rest of his life. Cioran kept their relationship entirely private, and never spoke of his relationship with Boué in his writings or interviews.

His first French book, A Short History of Decay, was published in 1949 by Gallimard, and was awarded the Prix Rivarol in 1950 for the best book written by a non-French author.Throughout his career, Cioran refused most literary prizes awarded to him.

== Later life and death ==
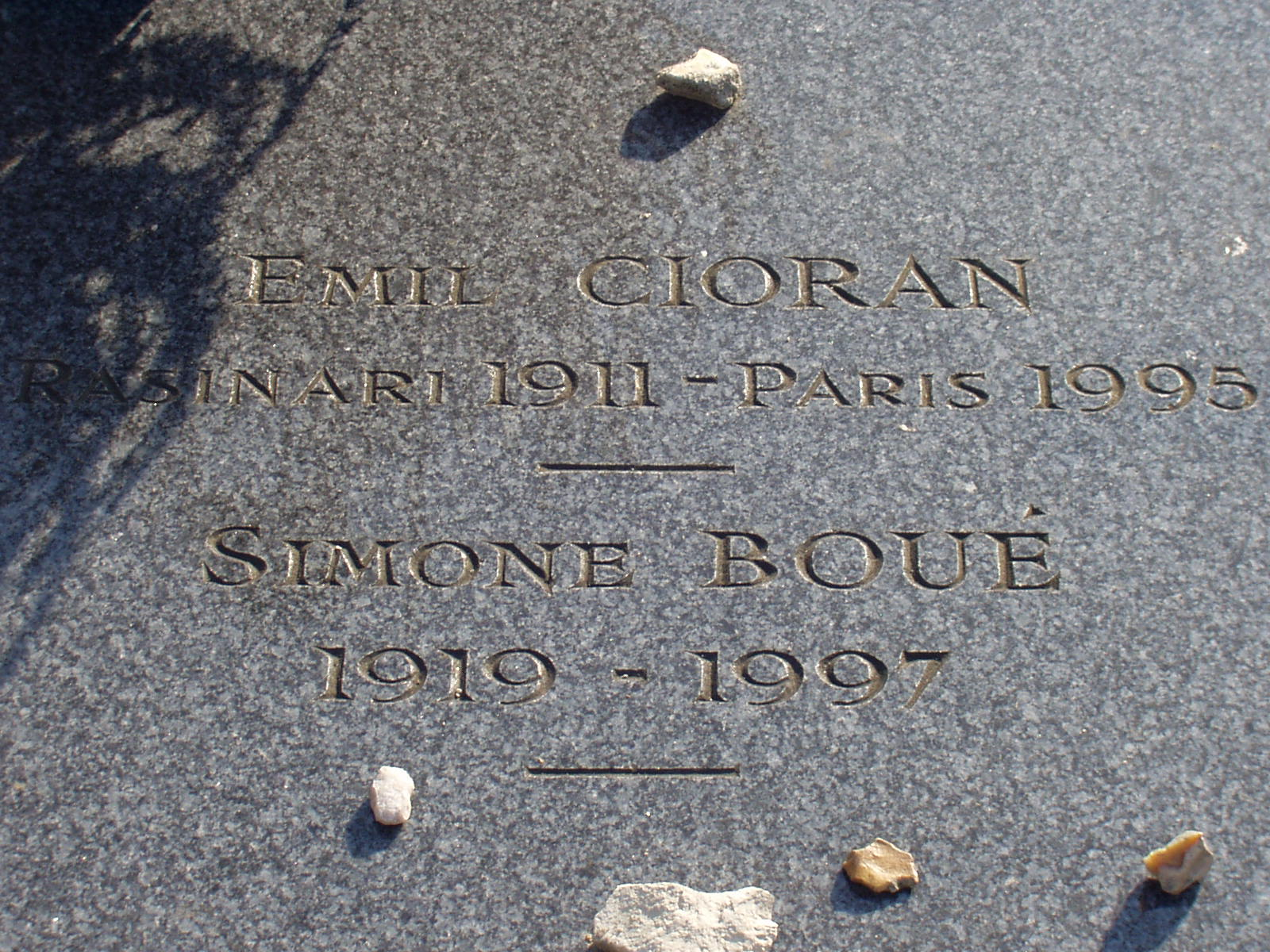
The tomb of Cioran and Simone Boué

The Latin Quarter of Paris became Cioran's permanent residence. He lived most of his life in seclusion, avoiding the public, but still maintained contact with numerous friends, including Mircea Eliade, Eugène Ionesco, Paul Celan, Samuel Beckett, Henri Michaux and Fernando Savater.

In a 1986 interview, Cioran said he no longer smoked or drank coffee or alcohol, citing health reasons.

In 1995, Cioran died of Alzheimer's disease and was buried at the Montparnasse Cemetery.

== Major themes and style ==
Professing a lack of interest in conventional philosophy in his early youth, Cioran dismissed abstract speculation in favor of personal reflection and passionate lyricism. "I invented nothing. I've been the one and only secretary of my own sensations," he later said.

Aphorisms make up a large portion of Cioran's bibliography, and some of his books, such as The Trouble with Being Born, are composed entirely of aphorisms. Speaking about this decision, Cioran said:

I only write this kind of stuff, because explaining bores me terribly. That's why I say when I've written aphorisms it's that I've sunk back into fatigue, why bother. And so, the aphorism is scorned by "serious" people, the professors look down upon it. When they read a book of aphorisms, they say, "Oh, look what this fellow said ten pages back, now he's saying the contrary. He's not serious." Me, I can put two aphorisms that are contradictory right next to each other. Aphorisms are also momentary truths. They're not decrees. And I could tell you in nearly every case why I wrote this or that phrase, and when. It's always set in motion by an encounter, an incident, a fit of temper, but they all have a cause. It's not at all gratuitous.

Philosophical pessimism characterizes all of his works, which many critics trace back to events of his childhood (in 1935 his mother is reputed to have told him that if she had known he was going to be so unhappy she would have aborted him). However, Cioran's pessimism (in fact, his skepticism, even nihilism) remains both inexhaustible and, in its own particular manner, joyful; it is not the sort of pessimism that can be traced back to simple origins, single origins themselves being questionable. When Cioran's mother spoke to him of abortion, he confessed that it did not disturb him, but made an extraordinary impression that led to an insight about the nature of existence ("I'm simply an accident. Why take it all so seriously?" is what he later said in reference to the incident).

His works often depict an atmosphere of torment, a state that Cioran himself experienced, and came to be dominated by lyricism and, often, the expression of intense and even violent feeling. The books he wrote in Romanian especially display this latter characteristic. Preoccupied with the problems of death and suffering, he was attracted to the idea of suicide, believing it to be an idea that could help one go on living, an idea that he fully explored in On the Heights of Despair. He revisits suicide in depth in The New Gods, which contains a section of aphorisms devoted to the subject. The theme of human alienation, the most prominent existentialist theme, presented by Jean-Paul Sartre and Albert Camus, is thus formulated, in 1932, by young Cioran: "Is it possible that existence is our exile and nothingness our home?" in On the Heights of Despair.

Cioran's works encompass many other themes as well: original sin, the tragic sense of history, the end of civilization, the refusal of consolation through faith, the obsession with the absolute, life as an expression of man's metaphysical exile, etc. He was a thinker passionate about history; widely reading the writers that were associated with the "Decadent movement". One of these writers was Oswald Spengler who influenced Cioran's political philosophy in that he offered Gnostic reflections on the destiny of man and civilization. According to Cioran, as long as man has kept in touch with his origins and hasn't cut himself off from himself, he has resisted decadence. Today, he is on his way to his own destruction through self-objectification, impeccable production and reproduction, excess of self-analysis and transparency, and artificial triumph.

Regarding God, Cioran has noted that "without Bach, God would be a complete second-rate figure" and that "Bach's music is the only argument proving the creation of the Universe cannot be regarded as a complete failure". Cioran went on to say "Bach, Shakespeare, Beethoven, Dostoevsky and Nietzsche are the only arguments against monotheism."

William H. Gass called Cioran's The Temptation to Exist "a philosophical romance on the modern themes of alienation, absurdity, boredom, futility, decay, the tyranny of history, the vulgarities of change, awareness as agony, reason as disease".

According to Susan Sontag, Cioran's subject is "on being a mind, a consciousness tuned to the highest pitch of refinement" and "[i]n Cioran's writings... the mind is a voyeur. But not upon 'the world.' Upon itself. Cioran is, to a degree reminiscent of Beckett, concerned with the absolute integrity of thought. That is, with the reduction or circumscription of thought to thinking about thinking."

Cioran became most famous while writing not in Romanian but French, a language with which he had struggled since his youth. During Cioran's lifetime, Saint-John Perse called him "the greatest French writer to honor our language since the death of Paul Valéry."

== Legacy ==
After the death of Cioran's long-term companion, Simone Boué, a collection of Cioran's manuscripts (over 30 notebooks) were found in the couple's apartment by a manager who tried to auction them in 2005. A decision taken by the Court of Appeal of Paris stopped the commercial sale of the collection. However, in March 2011, the Court of Appeal ruled that the seller was the legitimate owner of the manuscripts. The manuscripts were purchased by Romanian businessman George Brăiloiu for €405,000.

An aged Cioran is the main character in a play by Romanian dramatist-actor Matei Vișniec, Mansardă la Paris cu vedere spre moarte ("A Paris Loft with a View on Death"). The play, depicting an imaginary meeting between Vișniec and Cioran, was first brought to the stage in 2007, under the direction of Radu Afrim and with a cast of Romanian and Luxembourgian actors; Cioran was played by Constantin Cojocaru. Stagings were organized in the Romanian city of Sibiuand in Luxembourg, at Esch-sur-Alzette (both Sibiu and Luxembourg City were the year's European Capital of Culture). In 2009, the Romanian Academy granted posthumous membership to Cioran.

Susan Sontag was a great admirer of Cioran, calling him "one of the most delicate minds of real power writing today." She wrote an essay on his work that served as the introduction to the English translation of The Temptation to Exist, published in 1967. The essay was included in Sontag's 1969 collection Styles of Radical Will.

Under the rule of Nicolae Ceaușescu, Cioran's works were banned. In 1974, Francoist Spain banned The Evil Demiurge for being "atheist, blasphemous, and anti-Christian", which Cioran considered "one of the greatest jokes in his absurd existence."

American electronic musician Oneohtrix Point Never named a song after Cioran on his 2009 release Zones Without People.

== Major works ==
=== Romanian ===
- Pe culmile disperării (translated "On the Heights of Despair"), Editura "Fundația pentru Literatură și Artă", Bucharest 1934
- Cartea amăgirilor ("The Book of Deceptions"), Bucharest 1936; The Book of Deceptions. New York: Contra Mundum Press, 2026.
- Schimbarea la față a României ("The Transfiguration of Romania"), Bucharest 1936
- Lacrimi și Sfinți ("Tears and Saints"), "Editura autorului" 1937
- Îndreptar pătimaș ("The Passionate Handbook"), Humanitas, Bucharest 1991

=== French ===
All of Cioran's major works in French have been translated into English by Richard Howard.

- Précis de décomposition ("A Short History of Decay"), Gallimard 1949
- Syllogismes de l'amertume (literally "Syllogisms on Bitterness"; tr. "All Gall Is Divided"), Gallimard 1952
- La Tentation d'exister ("The Temptation to Exist"), Gallimard 1956, English edition: ISBN 978-0-226-10675-5
- Histoire et utopie ("History and Utopia"), Gallimard 1960
- La Chute dans le temps ("The Fall into Time"), Gallimard 1964
- Le Mauvais démiurge (literally The Evil Demiurge; tr. "The New Gods"), Gallimard 1969
- De l'inconvénient d'être né ("The Trouble with Being Born"), Gallimard 1973
- Exercices d'admiration 1986, and Aveux et anathèmes 1987 (tr. and grouped as "Anathemas and Admirations")
- Œuvres (Collected works), Gallimard-Quatro 1995
- Mon pays/Țara mea ("My country", written in French, the book was first published in Romania in a bilingual volume), Humanitas, Bucharest, 1996
- Cahiers 1957–1972 ("Notebooks"), Gallimard 1997
- Des larmes et des saints, L'Herne, English edition: ISBN 978-0-226-10672-4
- Sur les cimes du désespoir, L'Herne, English edition: ISBN 978-0-226-10670-0
- Le Crépuscule des pensées, L'Herne,
- Jadis et naguère, L'Herne
- Valéry face à ses idoles, L'Herne, 1970, 2006
- De la France, L'Herne, 2009
- Transfiguration de la Roumanie, L'Herne, 2009
- Cahier Cioran, L'Herne, 2009 (several unpublished documents, letters and photographs).

== See also ==
- Antinatalism
- Diogenes of Sinope
- French moralists
- Misanthropy
- Philosophical pessimism
- Romanian philosophy

== See also ==
- Quotations related to Emil Cioran at Wikiquote
- Media related to Emil Cioran at Wikimedia Commons
