= Rendezvous at Bray =

1971 film

- DVD cover
- Directed by: André Delvaux
- Written by: André Delvaux
- Based on: King Cophetua by Julien Gracq
- Produced by: Mag Bodard
- Starring: Anna Karina
- Cinematography: Ghislain Cloquet
- Edited by: Nicole Berckmans
- Music by: Frédéric Devreese
- Distributed by: Parc Film (France)
- Release date: June 1971
- Running time: 90 minutes
- Countries: France; Belgium
- Languages: French; German

Rendezvous at Bray aka Appointment in Bray (French: Rendez-vous à Bray) is a 1971 French-Belgian drama film directed by André Delvaux and starring Anna Karina. It was entered into the 21st Berlin International Film Festival. Much of the film may be imagined by the characters and much is unexplained, leaving viewers to come up with their own interpretations.

== Plot ==
Jacques, a composer serving as a fighter pilot during the First World War, asks his friend Julien, a Luxembourger working as a music journalist in Paris, to meet him at Bray behind the front lines. His family's country house is there, looked after by a solitary housekeeper. Jacques has not arrived when Julien turns up and is let in by the beautiful but largely silent woman. While she prepares him dinner, he reflects on the ups and downs of his life in Paris before the war with the charming rich Jacques and his vivacious girl friend Odile. After showing him to a bedroom, the servant spends the night with him. In the morning, he rushes off to the railway station but does not board the Paris train. Something, we do not know what, impels him to stay.

== Cast ==
- Anna Karina as Elle (la servante)
- Mathieu Carrière as Julien Eschenbach
- Roger Van Hool as Jacques Neuil
- Bulle Ogier as Odile
- Boby Lapointe as L'Aubergiste
- Pierre Vernier as Monsieur Hausmann
- Luce Garcia-Ville as Mme Nueil
- Nella Bielski as Un Visage (la femme du train)
- Pierre Lampe as Le Soldat
- Jean Aron as Joseph, le projectionniste
- Léonce Corne as Le Garde-Vue
- Martine Sarcey as Mme Hausmann
- Jean Bouise as Le rédacteur en chef
