= Proust and Signs =

1964 book by Gilles Deleuze

- Cover of the first edition
- Author: Gilles Deleuze
- Original title: Marcel Proust et les signes
- Translator: Richard Howard
- Language: French
- Subject: Marcel Proust
- Published: 1964 (Presses Universitaires de France, in French); 1972 (George Braziller, in English)
- Publication place: France
- Media type: Print (Hardcover and Paperback)
- Pages: 188 (University of Minnesota Press edition, 2000)
- ISBN: 978-0816632589

Proust and Signs (French: Marcel Proust et les signes) is a book by the philosopher Gilles Deleuze, in which the author explores the system of signs within the work of the celebrated French novelist Marcel Proust. It was first published in 1964; its second edition (1972) added an eighth concluding chapter ("L'Image de la pensée" or "The Image of Thought"), and its third edition (1976) appended an entire second part ("La machine littéraire" or "The Literary Machine"). The book was translated into English by Richard Howard. Deleuze uses the word transversality as a critical concept for his literary criticism in the second edition.

Deleuze looks at signs left by persons and events in Marcel Proust's In Search of Lost Time, illustrating how memory interprets the signs creatively but inaccurately. The jealous lover, for example, cannot accurately decipher the deceptions of his beloved. Deleuze demonstrates how Proust's book, because of the multiplication of signs, becomes a literary machine, or rather three literary machines: of partial objects or impulses, of resources, and of forced moments. Deleuze understands Proust (or the narrator) as the "universal schizophrenic" whose signs weave a spider web by sending out threads to the paranoiac Charlus and the erotomaniac Albertine, all "marionettes of his own delirium" or "profiles of his own madness." These thematic links between signs, events and love are taken up elsewhere in Deleuze's work, most notably in his Capitalism and Schizophrenia collaborations with Félix Guattari.
