= A Short History of Decay (book) =

1949 philosophical book by Emil Cioran

- Author: Emil Cioran
- Translator: Richard Howard
- Language: French
- Genre: Philosophy
- Publication date: 1949
- ISBN: 978-0141192727
- Followed by: All Gall Is Divided

A Short History of Decay (French: Précis de décomposition) is a 1949 philosophical book by Romanian philosopher Emil Cioran, his first work written in French. Nihilistic in tone, the book consists of a series of philosophical reflections on various subjects, such as fanaticism, music, and progress. The major theme of the book is the concept of decay, which may occur in individuals as disease or mental illness, and which may occur in societies as decline into decadence.

In 1937, Cioran left his native country of Romania for Paris, where he remained for the rest of his life. This break marked two periods in Cioran's work: an early Romanian period, and a later, mature French period. The interval between Cioran's relocation and the appearance of A Short History of Decay coincided with World War II. From 1937 to 1949, Cioran learned French until he felt able to publish in the language. In 1947 he submitted A Short History of Decay to the publisher Gallimard, but he withdrew it in order to rewrite it. The book was finally published in 1949. Cioran described the process of learning French as "the most difficult task of my life", comparing it to "putting on a straitjacket".

A Short History of Decay was awarded the Rivarol Prize, a French literary prize; the prize committee included André Gide. Although Cioran refused most literary prizes awarded him, he accepted the Rivarol as recognition of his first French work, the language he would write in for the rest of his life.

A Short History of Decay was followed in 1952 by All Gall Is Divided, Cioran's second French book.

== Synopsis ==
The text consists of a series of brief reflections and short essays, usually ranging in length from one to three pages, and organized into six chapters. (Note: Chapters 1, 2, 4 and 6 consist of 78, 10, 18 and 34 reflections, respectively. Chapters 3 and 5 each consist of a single essay.) Throughout the text, Cioran entertains several of the negative themes which permeate his work, in poetic language. These themes include a dissatisfaction with the world, his views on the futility of life, antinatalism, and anti-Christian sentiments:

Having lived out – having verified all the arguments against life – I have stripped it of its savors... I have known post-sexual metaphysics, the void of the futilely procreated universe, and that dissipation of sweat which plunges you into an age-old chill, anterior to the rages of matter. And I have tried to be faithful to my knowledge, to force my instincts to yield, and realized that it is no use wielding the weapons of nothingness if you cannot turn them against yourself. For the outburst of desires, amid our knowledge which contradicts them, creates a dreadful conflict between our mind opposing the Creation and the irrational substratum which binds us to it still.

Having exhausted his appetites, the man who approaches a limit-form of detachment no longer wants to perpetuate himself; he loathes surviving in someone else, to whom moreover he has nothing more to transmit; the species appalls him; he is a monster – and monsters do not beget.

How I detest, Lord, the turpitude of Your works and these syrupy ghosts who burn incense to You and resemble You! Hating You, I have escaped the sugar mills of Your kingdom, the twaddle of Your puppets... Of all that was attempted this side of nothingness, is anything more pathetic than this world, except for the idea which conceived it?

In the book's first chapter – its longest, taking up half the book's length – Cioran instead stresses the themes which are specific to the book. These themes include the general concept of decay (of individuals, societies and the universe) and the goodness of doubt. According to Cioran, doubt is better than certainty in some imperative ideal (especially religious or political ideals) because those who are convinced of such an ideal may be willing to kill for its sake:

Once man loses his faculty of indifference he becomes a potential murderer; once he transforms his idea into a god the consequences are incalculable. We kill only in the name of a god or of his counterfeits: the excesses provoked by the goddess Reason, by the concept of nation, class, or race are akin to those of the Inquisition or of the Reformation.

Because of his affinity for doubt, Cioran expresses admiration for civilizational decline, citing as examples the declines of Ancient Greece, Ancient Rome and the French Ancien Régime (which preceded the French Revolution). According to Cioran, such periods of decline are better than eras of social stability because they erode old certainties, making it possible for people to wonder and doubt again.

Intelligence flourishes only in the ages when beliefs wither, when their articles and their precepts slacken, when their rules collapse. Every period's ending is the mind's paradise, for the mind regains its play and its whims only within an organism in utter dissolution. The man who has the misfortune to belong to a period of creation and fecundity suffers its limitations and its ruts; slave of a unilateral vision, he is enclosed within a limited horizon.

We must be thankful to the civilizations which have not taken an overdose of seriousness, which have played with values and taken their pleasure in begetting and destroying them. Who knows, outside of the Greek and French civilizations, a more lucidly facetious proof of the elegant nothingness of things? The age of Alcibiades and the eighteenth century in France are two sources of consolation.

Cioran reworked several passages from his earlier Romanian period for inclusion in A Short History of Decay, his first French work. One such passage considers religious attitudes within Spain and Russia. According to Cioran, although both countries have a long Christian tradition, irreligious populations in both countries act as foils to the idea of God, preservering its vitality and cultural relevance – which would be diminished in a more uniformly Christian population. This passage is a revision of a piece included in the earlier book Tears and Saints; the characteristic phrase "If God were a cyclops, Spain would be His eye" is found in both works.

He dreads Spain as He dreads Russia – and multiplies atheists in both. Their attacks at least let Him retain the illusion of omnipotence: still an attribute preserved! But the believers! Dostoevsky, El Greco: has He ever had more feverish enemies? ... If God were a cyclops, Spain would be His eye.

== Reception ==
In 1950, A Short History of Decay was awarded the Prix Rivarol for the best work by a non-French author. Despite this Cioran gave a self-criticism, stating that the book was "not succinct, as it should have been".

Carla Thomas of the Goddard College Department of Philosophy praised the book's prose, describing Cioran as a "master of cynicism, of the sardonic aperçu and the trenchant aphorism." Nathan Knapp of the Times Literary Supplement spoke positively of the sense of dread Cioran depicted within the book, and writing in 2019, said that "he is exactly the kind of thinker our present moment most richly deserves."

In 1936 Cioran published The Transfiguration of Romania, a book which argued for the installation of a totalitarian government in Romania. During this time Cioran also supported the Iron Guard, a Romanian fascist movement. Following the conclusion of World War II, Cioran renounced his youthful fascist sympathies. Sections of A Short History of Decay were interpreted by Cioran biographer Marta Petreu as a "sideways apology" for his previous support of the Iron Guard.
