= The Castle of Argol =

1938 novel by Julien Gracq

- First edition
- Author: Julien Gracq
- Original title: Au château d'Argol
- Translator: Louise Varèse
- Language: French
- Publisher: José Corti
- Publication date: 1938
- Publication place: France
- English publication date: 1951
- Pages: 182

The Castle of Argol (French: Au château d'Argol) is a 1938 novel by the French writer Julien Gracq. The narrative is set at a castle in Brittany, where a man has invited a friend, who also has brought a young woman. With a highly abstract plot, the novel is loaded with symbols and uses narrative modes from Gothic horror literature which blends with Hegelian thinking and stylistic traits close to the surrealist movement. In his "Notice to the reader", Gracq describes the book as a "demonic version" of Richard Wagner's opera Parsifal.

== Publication ==
The novel, which was the author's first, was rejected by éditions Gallimard. However, it was accepted and published by José Corti, who was associated with the surrealists, and was praised by the surrealist leader André Breton. An English translation by Louise Varèse was published in 1951.
