= A Dark Stranger =

1945 novel by Julien Gracq

- First English-language edition
- Author: Julien Gracq
- Original title: Un beau ténébreux
- Translator: W. J. Strachan
- Cover artist: Gertrude Houston (pictured)
- Language: French
- Publisher: José Corti
- Publication date: 1945
- Publication place: France
- English publication date: 1950 (publ. New Directions)

A Dark Stranger (French: Un beau ténébreux) is a 1945 novel by the French writer Julien Gracq. It tells the story of an enigmatic guest whose presence at an isolated resort hotel in Brittany strangely affects a small group of fellow vacationers.

== Publication ==
José Corti published the book in France in 1945. It was published in English through Peter Owen Publishers in 1950, translated by W. J. Strachan. A new translation by Christopher Moncrieff was published by Pushkin Press in 2009.

== Reception ==
John Cournos of The Saturday Review wrote about the book in 1950: "Its matter is morbid, its prose overwrought, its range narrow; it is tedious. ... This is the sort of book that the Soviet critics constantly hold up before their readers as an example of the decadence of the bourgeoisie, and for once there is no answer. The author's ability to describe landscape and its moods, however brilliant, is not enough."

In a more recent and appreciative commentary, Stephen Sparks writes that "A Dark Stranger, Julien Gracq’s second novel, is an unsettling allegory of the terrible fascination history exerts upon individuals caught up in its inexorable and merciless unfolding. [...] While Gracq’s allusive, layered prose [...] has historically received the lion’s share of praise, his handling of plot is equally dexterous. His reading of the aforementioned authors [Edgar Allan Poe and Jules Verne] was not wasted: A Dark Stranger is, in its singular way, as thrilling and breathless a story as the best page-turner."
