= Balcony in the Forest =

1958 novel by Julien Gracq

- First English edition (US)
- Author: Julien Gracq
- Original title: Un balcon en forêt
- Translator: Richard Howard
- Language: French
- Publisher: José Corti; George Braziller (US); Hutchinson (UK)
- Publication date: 1958
- Publication place: France
- English publication date: 1959
- Pages: 253

Balcony in the Forest (French: Un balcon en forêt) is a 1958 novel by the French writer Julien Gracq. It tells the story of a French lieutenant, Grange, who is assigned to a concrete antitank blockhouse in the forest of the Ardennes in the autumn of 1939, where he waits with three enlisted men for World War II to reach that section of France.

An English translation by Richard Howard was published in 1959. The book was the basis for a 1978 film with the same title directed by Michel Mitrani.

== Reception ==
Max Bogart wrote in The Saturday Review: "Julien Gracq has written a sensitive and analytical study of men enmeshed in a phony war—a war that would ultimately result in the tragic, dramatic fall of France. ... Gracq's characterizations are vivid and the story is completely credible with one major exception: the lieutenant's love affair mars the narrative's development, for Mona, a young widow, is an elusive, shadowy figure, who not only puzzled Grange, but whose role in this story mystified this reader. ... The facile pen of the author is evident on every page, especially in the descriptive passages of the phantom forest, the seasonal landscape colors, and the beauty of nature in contrast with man's destructiveness in wartime."
