= Grand prix de littérature Paul-Morand =

French literary prize

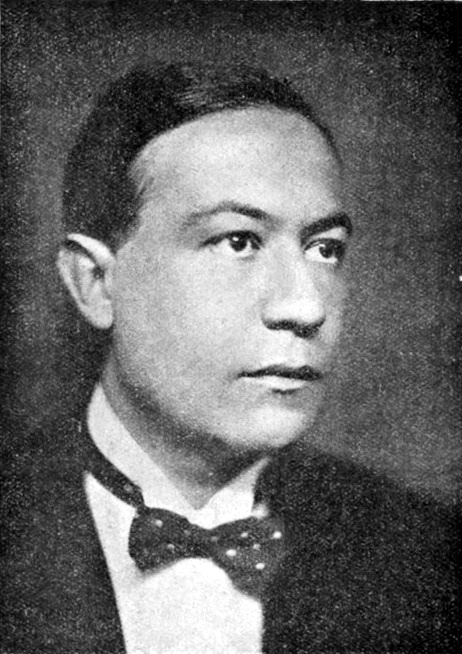
Writer Paul Morand

The Grand prix de littérature Paul-Morand is a French literary award, established by the Académie française in 1977 and handed out in 1980 for the first time. The prize goes to an author for their entire body of work. It is named after the writer Paul Morand. It is handed out every second year, alternately with the Grand prix de littérature de l'Académie française.

== Laureates ==
- 1980: Jean-Marie Le Clézio
- 1982: Henri Pollès
- 1984: Christine de Rivoyre
- 1986: Jean Orieux
- 1988: Emil Cioran (refused)
- 1990: Jean-François Deniau
- 1992: Philippe Sollers
- 1994: Andrée Chedid
- 1996: Marcel Schneider
- 1998: Daniel Rondeau
- 2000: Patrick Modiano
- 2002: Jean-Paul Kauffmann
- 2004: Jean Rolin
- 2006: Jean Echenoz
- 2008: Jacques Roubaud
- 2010: Olivier Rolin
- 2012: Patrick Grainville
- 2014: Gilles Lapouge
- 2016: Not awarded
- 2018: Charles Dantzig
- 2020: Valère Novarina
- 2022: Éric Neuhoff
- 2024: Marcel Cohen (writer)
