= The Trouble with Being Born (book) =

1973 book by Emil Cioran

The Trouble With Being Born
- Author: Emil Cioran
- Translator: Richard Howard
- Language: French
- Genre: Philosophy
- Publisher: Arcade Publishing
- Publication date: 1973
- Publication place: France
- English publication date: 1976
- Pages: 217
- ISBN: 9781611450446
- Preceded by: The New Gods
- Followed by: Drawn and Quartered

The Trouble with Being Born (French: De l'inconvénient d'être né) is a 1973 philosophy book by Romanian author Emil Cioran. The book is presented as a series of aphorisms, meditating primarily on the painful nature of being alive, and how this is connected to other subjects, such as God, metaphysical exile, and decay. In 2020, The Trouble with Being Born became a Penguin Modern Classic.

Initially written in French, the 1976 English translation by Richard Howard received the PEN Translation Prize.

== Usage of aphorism ==
Cioran's decision to write entirely in aphorisms was a departure from his previously established writing style. On the Heights of Despair was composed of essays, about a page each, which while different to most conventional philosophy, also separates it from The Trouble with Being Born. (Note: In total, The Trouble with Being Born consists of 883 fragments, separated by bullets. Chapters 1 through 12 consist of 99, 84, 74, 37, 65, 61, 98, 88, 69, 101, 43 and 64 fragments, respectively.) Speaking about his decision to write in such a manner, Cioran said he used aphorisms because "Explaining bores me terribly. When I've written aphorisms it's because I've sunk back into fatigue – why bother? And so, the aphorism is scorned by 'serious' people, professors look down upon it. When they read a book of aphorisms, they say, 'Oh, look what this guy said ten pages back, now he's saying the contrary. He's not serious.' I can put two aphorisms that are contradictory right next to each other. It's not at all gratuitous."

The Trouble with Being Born also makes direct reference to aphorisms. The book describes aphorisms as "Fire without flames. Understandable that no-one tries to warm himself at it."

== Reception ==
Writing for The Independent, Nicholas Lezard said "Why should we be interested in the opinions of this eccentric, who is, moreover, contradictory, perverse, resistant to intellectual theory and uninterested in questions of semiotics? Because Cioran actually makes his philosophy perfectly democratic, assimilable by anyone. Cioran's loathing is genuine, all-inclusive, and yet perversely generous (the book's second-last aphorism begins 'No one has loved the world more than I . . .', which might be a joke). Only someone so doubtful of the world's fundamental givens can be trusted. His scepticism lights things up like a torch." In an issue of The Millions, Michael Robbins cited The Trouble with Being Born as one of his favourite books, and said "it's a pity Cioran and Weil never met."
