= The Opposing Shore =

Novel by Julien Gracq

- First edition cover
- Author: Julien Gracq
- Original title: Le Rivage des Syrtes
- Translator: Richard Howard
- Language: French
- Publisher: José Corti
- Publication date: 1951
- Publication place: France
- English publication date: 1986
- Pages: 353

The Opposing Shore (French: Le Rivage des Syrtes) is a 1951 novel by the French writer Julien Gracq. The story is set at the border between two fictional Mediterranean countries, Orsenna and Farghestan, which have been at war for 300 years. It is Gracq's third and most famous novel. It was awarded the Prix Goncourt, but Gracq refused to accept the prize as a protest against commercial compromising in world literature.

The novel has been described as a "Wagnerian prelude for an unplayed opera" as it doesn't focus on telling a story but is first and foremost concerned with creating a mysterious, out-of-time atmosphere.

== Plot ==
A novel of waiting, it is set in an almost empty old fortress close to a sea which defines the ancestral border between the stagnant principality of Orsenna and the territory of its archenemy, the mysterious and elusive Farghestan. The two countries are officially at war although no fighting has taken place for decades, so that there is an uneasy, de facto peace.

The main character, Aldo, is sent as an "observer" to the isolated fortress. Bored with the immobility and eerie silence, he longs for action and slowly becomes obsessed with the unseen border. Aldo starts entertaining the thought of crossing it, even if that leads to a resuming of hostilities and the possible collapse of his own civilisation, reasoning that destruction may be preferable to slow decadence.

The novel ends when the "story" begins, i.e. when consequences of his actions start manifesting themselves.

== Themes ==
Like several other works by Julien Gracq, The Opposing Shore expresses its author's fascination with expectation, the foreboding and apocalypse. It fits within the popular 20th-century theme of 'waiting for the barbarians'. Orsenna symbolizes history, tradition and order, while Farghestan stands for the irrational and ahistorical. Aldo's attraction to Farghestan and his attempt to escape the reality of history is portrayed as both heroic and self-destructive. The dreamlike qualities of the novel are related to Gracq's previous affinity with the surrealist movement; Gracq described The Opposing Shore as an "awakened dream".

== Publication ==
The book was published through José Corti in 1951. An English translation by Richard Howard was published by Columbia University Press in 1986.

== Reception ==
Elisabeth Cardonne-Arlyck wrote in The New York Times in 1986:

In different ways, the French title Le Rivage des Syrtes and its English counterpart, The Opposing Shore, conjure up this old image of an alien coast, clearly still vivid in the Western imagination. ... The author uses his extensive classical culture and Proustian sense of names to create a geography of the mind.

Cardonne-Arlyck continued:

There are some word choices I question, but one of the achievements of Mr. Howard's translation is that he has faced up to what are stylistic peculiarities in the French text and rendered them into an equally intricate but lush and rhythmic prose. The Opposing Shore is Mr. Gracq's best-known and richest work. It has already been translated into six languages, and its long overdue appearance in English reminds us of one of the more stimulating and original imaginations in contemporary French literature.
