= Richard Howard =

American poet (1929–2022)

- Born: Richard Joseph Howard; October 13, 1929; Cleveland, Ohio, U.S.
- Died: March 31, 2022 (aged 92); New York City, U.S.
- Education: Columbia University (BA); University of Paris
- Writing career
- Notable awards: Guggenheim Fellowship (1966); MacArthur Fellows Program (1996); Pulitzer Prize for Poetry (1970); National Book Award (1983)

Richard Joseph Howard (October 13, 1929 – March 31, 2022), adopted as Richard Joseph Orwitz, was an American poet, literary critic, essayist, teacher, and translator. He was poet laureate of New York from 1993 to 1995. He was born in Cleveland, Ohio, and graduated from Columbia University, where he studied under Mark Van Doren, and where he was an emeritus professor. He lived in New York City.

== Life ==
After reading French letters at the Sorbonne in 1952–53, Howard had a brief early career as a lexicographer. He soon turned his attention to poetry and poetic criticism, and won the Pulitzer Prize for poetry for his 1969 collection Untitled Subjects, which took for its subject dramatic imagined letters and monologues of 19th-century historical figures. For much of his career, Howard composed poems employing a quantitative verse technique.

A prolific literary critic, Howard's monumental 1969 volume Alone With America stretches to 594 pages and profiles 41 American poets who had published at least two books each and "have come into a characteristic and—as I see it—consequential identity since the time, say, of the Korean War." Howard would later tell an interviewer

I wrote the book not for the sense of history, but for myself, knowing that a relation to one's moment was essential to getting beyond the moment. As I quoted Shaw in the book's preface, if you cannot believe in the greatness of your own age and inheritance, you will fall into confusion of mind and contrariety of spirit. The book was a rescuing anatomy of such belief, the construction of a credendum—articles of faith, or at least appreciation.

He was awarded the PEN Translation Prize in 1976 for his translation of E. M. Cioran's A Short History of Decay and the National Book Award for his 1983 translation of Baudelaire's Les Fleurs du mal. He was the longest-serving Poetry Editor of The Paris Review, from 1992 until 2005. He received a Pulitzer Prize, the Academy of Arts and Letters Literary Award, and a MacArthur Fellowship. In 1985, Howard received the PEN/Ralph Manheim Medal for Translation. He served as Chancellor of the Academy of American Poets, and also as Professor of Practice in the writing program at Columbia's School of the Arts. He was previously University Professor of English at the University of Houston and, before that, Ropes Professor of Comparative Literature at the University of Cincinnati. He served as Poet Laureate of the State of New York from 1993 to 1995.

In 1982, Howard was named a Chevalier of L'Ordre National du Mérite by the government of France.

Two of Howard's books, Untitled Subjects (1969) and Findings (1971), were included by critic Harold Bloom in his 1994 list of works constituting the Western Canon.

In 2016, he received the Philolexian Society Award for Distinguished Literary Achievement.

Howard died in New York City on March 31, 2022, from complications of dementia.

== Personal life ==
Richard Howard was born to poor Jewish parents. His last name at birth is unknown. He was adopted as an infant by Emma Joseph and Harry Orwitz, a middle-class Cleveland couple, who were also Jewish; his mother changed their last names to "Howard" when he was an infant after she divorced Orwitz. Howard never met his birth parents, nor his sister, who was adopted by another local family. Howard was gay, a fact that comes up frequently in his later work. He was out to some degree since at least the 1960s, when he remarked to friend W. H. Auden that he was offended by a fellow poet's use of Jewish and gay epithets, "since [he was] both these things", to which Auden replied, "My dear, I never knew you were Jewish!"

Howard was renowned for the extreme number of books that he had collected over his lifetime and which famously lined the walls of his New York City apartment. Additionally, he kept on his bed a large stuffed gorilla named "Mildred".

== Works ==
=== Poetry ===
- Quantities (1962)
- Damages (1967)
- Untitled Subjects (1969)
- Findings (1971)
- Two-Part Inventions (1974)
- Fellow Feelings (1976)
- Misgivings (1979)
- Lining Up (1984)
- No Traveller (1989)
- Selected Poems (1991)
- Like Most Revelations (1994)
- Trappings (1999)
- Talking Cures (2002)
- Fallacies of Wonder (2003)
- Inner Voices (selected poems), 2004
- The Silent Treatment (2005)
- Without Saying (2008)
- A Progressive Education (2014)
- Richard Howard Loves Henry James and Other American Writers (2020)

=== Critical essays ===
- Alone With America: Essays on the Art of Poetry in the United States Since 1950 (1969)
- Preferences: 51 American Poets Choose Poems From Their Own Work and From the Past (1974)
- Travel Writing of Henry James (essay) (1994)
- Paper Trail: Selected Prose 1965–2003 (2004)

=== Major translations (French to English) ===
- The Unknown Masterpiece by Honoré de Balzac
- Les Fleurs du mal by Charles Baudelaire
- Camera Lucida by Roland Barthes and other works, such as Mythologies and Mourning Diary
- Force of Circumstance by Simone de Beauvoir
- Nadja by André Breton
- Mobile by Michel Butor and other works, such as Degrees
- Tricks by Renaud Camus
- A Happy Death by Albert Camus
- Foreign Bodies by Jean Cayrol
- The Trouble with Being Born by Emil Cioran and other works, such as A Short History of Decay
- Diary of a Genius by Salvador Dalí
- Proust and Signs by Gilles Deleuze
- The Fire Within by Pierre Drieu La Rochelle
- William Marshal: The Flower of Chivalry by Georges Duby
- No More by Marguerite Duras
- Madness and Civilization by Michel Foucault and other works
- When the World Spoke French by Marc Fumaroli
- The War Memoirs (Unity and Salvation) by Charles de Gaulle
- The Immoralist by André Gide and other works
- Lying Woman by Jean Giraudoux
- The Traitor by André Gorz
- The Opposing Shore by Julien Gracq and other works, such as Balcony in the Forest
- Nedjma by Kateb Yacine
- The Rock Garden by Nikos Kazantzakis
- Manhood: A Journey from Childhood into the Fierce Order of Virility by Michel Leiris
- Like Death by Guy de Maupassant and other works, such as Alien Hearts
- The Marquise Went Out at Five by Claude Mauriac as well as All Women Are Fatal
- Hothouses by Maurice Maeterlinck
- The Stars by Edgar Morin
- The History of Surrealism by Maurice Nadeau
- Monsieur Levert by Robert Pinget
- Swann's Way by Marcel Proust
- Jealousy by Alain Robbe-Grillet and other works, such as The Erasers and The Voyeur
- Cupid’s Executioners by Hubert Monteilhet and other works
- La Guerre en Algérie by Jules Roy
- The Little Prince by Antoine de Saint-Exupéry
- Nausea by Jean-Paul Sartre
- The Flanders Road by Claude Simon and other works, such as The Wind and The Grass
- The Charterhouse of Parma by Stendhal
- The Conquest of America: The Question of the Other by Tzvetan Todorov
- Paris in the Twentieth Century by Jules Verne
