= Julien Gracq =

French writer (1910-2007)

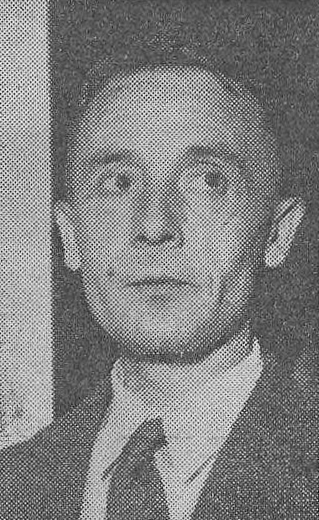
- Gracq in 1951
- Born: Louis Poirier; 27 July 1910; Saint-Florent-le-Vieil, Maine-et-Loire, France
- Died: 22 December 2007 (aged 97); Angers, France
- Education: University of Paris
- Occupations: Novelist, critic, playwright, poet
- Writing career
- Period: 1938–2002

Signature
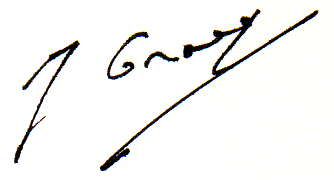

Julien Gracq (French: [gʁak]; born Louis Poirier; 27 July 1910 – 22 December 2007) was a French writer. He wrote novels, critiques, a play, and poetry. His literary works were noted for their dreamlike abstraction, elegant style and refined vocabulary. He was close to the surrealist movement, in particular its leader André Breton.

== Life ==
Gracq first studied in Paris at the Lycée Henri IV, where he earned his baccalauréat. He then entered the École Normale Supérieure in 1930, later studying at the École libre des sciences politiques (Sciences Po.), both schools of the University of Paris at the time.

In 1932, he read André Breton's Nadja, which deeply influenced him. His first novel, The Castle of Argol, is dedicated to that surrealist writer, to whom he devoted a whole book in 1948.

In 1936, he joined the French Communist Party but quit the party in 1939 after the Molotov–Ribbentrop Pact was signed.

During the Second World War, he was a prisoner of war in Silesia with other officers of the French Army. One of the friendships he formed there was with author and literary critic Armand Hoog, who later described Gracq as a passionate individualist and ferociously anti-Vichy.

In 1950, he published a fierce attack on contemporary literary culture and literary prizes in the review Empédocle titled La Littérature à l'estomac. When he won the Prix Goncourt for The Opposing Shore (Le Rivage des Syrtes) the following year, he remained consistent with his criticism and refused the prize.

Gracq taught history and geography in secondary school (high school) until he retired in 1970.

In 1979, he wrote the foreword to a re-edition of the Journal de l'analogiste (1954) by Suzanne Lilar, a work he called a "sumptuous initiation to poetry" ("une initiation somptueuse à la poésie").

In 1989, Gracq's work was published by the Bibliothèque de la Pléiade. He remained distant from major literary events and faithful to his first publisher, José Corti.

Gracq lived a quiet life in his native town of Saint-Florent-le-Vieil, on the banks of the river Loire. On 22 December 2007, a couple of days after suffering a dizzy spell, he died at the age of 97 in a hospital in Angers.

Gracq left notebooks with about 3500 pages of unpublished material. He expressed a wish that none of it should be published until at least 20 years after his death. His novel The Sunset Lands, which he worked on from 1953 to 1956 but abandoned, was published in 2014.

== The Opposing Shore ==
The Opposing Shore (Le Rivage des Syrtes, 1951) is Julien Gracq's most famous novel.

A novel of waiting, it is set in an old fortress close to a sea which defines the ancestral border between the stagnant principality of Orsenna and the territory of its archenemy, the mysterious Farghestan. Its lonely characters are caught in a no man's land, waiting for something to happen and wondering whether something should be done to bring about change, particularly when change may mean the death of civilisations.

== Works ==
- Au château d'Argol, 1938 (novel). The Castle of Argol
- Un beau ténébreux, 1945 (novel). A Dark Stranger
- Liberté grande, 1946 (poetry). Great Liberty
- Le Roi pêcheur, 1948 (play)
- André Breton, quelques aspects de l'écrivain, 1948 (critique)
- La Littérature à l'estomac, 1949
- Le Rivage des Syrtes, 1951 (novel). The Opposing Shore
- Prose pour l'Étrangère, 1952
- Penthésilée, 1954 (play; translation of Kleist's Penthesilea)
- Un balcon en forêt, 1958 (novel). Balcony in the Forest
- Préférences, 1961
- Lettrines, 1967
- La Presqu'île, 1970
- Le Roi Cophetua, 1970 (novel). King Cophetua; it inspired the film Rendezvous at Bray, directed by André Delvaux
- Lettrines II, 1974
- Les Eaux Étroites, 1976. The Narrow Waters; allusions, allegories and metaphors on a French river, l'Èvre
- En lisant en écrivant, 1980. Reading Writing
- La Forme d'une ville, 1985. The Shape of a City
- Autour des sept collines, 1988
- Carnets du grand chemin, 1992
- Entretiens, 2002
- Les Terres du couchant, 2014 (novel). The Sunset Lands

== See also ==
- Le Monde's 100 Books of the Century, a list which includes The Opposing Shore
