= José Corti =

French bookseller and publishing house

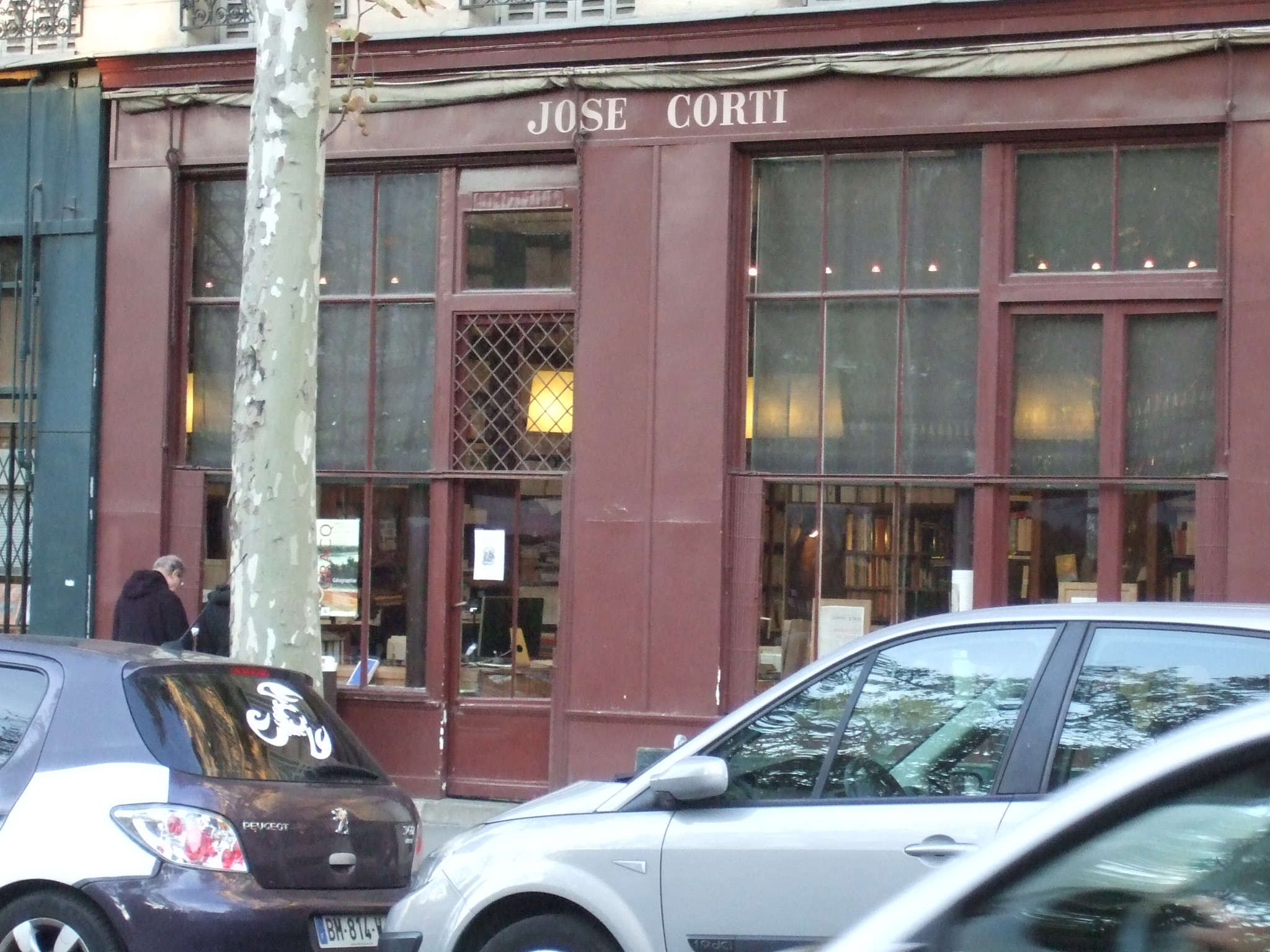
- Bookstore José-Corti, 11 rue de Médicis in Paris.
- Born: 14 January 1895; Vitry-sur-Seine
- Died: 25 December 1984 (aged 89); Paris
- Occupation: Publisher

José Corti is a bookshop and publishing house located in Paris, France, and was founded in 1925.

It is named after its founder, José Corticchiato (14 January 1895 – 25 December 1984). José Corticchiato started his business by publishing the work of his surrealist friends that included the founder André Breton, Paul Éluard, and Louis Aragon.

José Corti's bookshop is located in the Latin Quarter in Paris, at 11 Rue Médicis, 75006 Paris (VI^{ème}).

The firm was the lifelong publisher of French author Julien Gracq, and owns the publishing rights to Jan Potocki's masterpiece The Manuscript Found in Saragossa. Its motto is Rien de Commun, which means "Nothing Commonplace".

At the end of 2016, the bookshop at 11 rue de Médicis closed. It reopened in February 2017 under the name "Librairie des éditeurs associés", which still houses the Corti publishing collection, as well as other independent publishers.

In 2023, Marie de Quatrebarbes and Maël Guesdon took over the management of the house.

== See also ==
- Books in France
