= 32nd Cairo International Film Festival =

Egyptian film festival in 2008

- 32nd CIFF Official Poster
- Location: Cairo, Egypt
- Founded: 1976
- Awards: Golden Pyramid
- Festival date: November 18–28, 2008
- Website: http://www.cairofilmfest.org/

The 32nd annual Cairo International Film Festival was held from November 18 to November 28, 2008. Spanish director Imanol Uribe was the president of the jury.

== Films in competition ==
The following films competed for the Golden Pyramid.

English title	Original title	Director(s)	Country
The Tango Dancer		Gabriel Adrian Arregue	Argentina
Cut Loose	Los	Jan Verheyen	Belgium
Dancers	Dancen	Pernille Fischer Christensen	Denmark
The Day We Met	يوم ما اتقابلنا	Ismail Murad	Egypt
Séraphine	Séraphine	Martin Provost	France
Mark of an Angel	L'empreite de l'ange	Safy Nebbou	France
Where the Grass is Greener	Nur ein Sommer	Tamara Staudt	Germany/Switzerland
El Greco	Ελ Γκρέκο	Yannis Smaragdis	Greece
Mario the Magician	Márió, a varázsló	Tamás Almási	Hungary/Italy
In the Flesh	Il Tuo Disprezzo	Christian Angeli	Italy
Tea Fight	闘茶	Wang Yeming	Japan/Taiwan
GIMP		Ayan Ganesh	India
The Collectress	Kolekcioniere	Kristina Buozyte	Lithuania
Finding Shangri-La	這兒是香格里拉	Ismene Ting	China
The Vanished Empire	Исчезнувшая империя	Karen Shakhnazarov	Russia
Return to Hansala	Retorno a Hansala	Chus Gutiérrez	Spain
The Blind Sunflowers	Los girasoles ciegos	José Luis Cuerda	Spain
Tandoori Love		Oliver Pavlus	Switzerland
The Messenger	Ulak	Çağan Irmak	Turkey

== Digital Competition ==
The following films were screened in the Digital Competition for Feature Films category.

English title	Original title	Director(s)	Country
No One's Normal When You're Near	De cerca nadie es normal	Marcelo Mosenson	Argentina
Behind the Glass	Iza stakla	Zrinko Ogresta	Croatia
The Story of the Virgin Butterfly	قصة الفراشة العذراء	Walid Aouni	Egypt
W.C.		Liam O Mochain	Ireland
Three Lira	Lira 3	Andrea Pellizzer	Italy
Goodbye	へばの	Bunyo Kimura	Japan
Be With Me	خليك معي	Elie Habib	Lebanon
Seasons of Life		Charles Shimu Joya	Malawi
Changing Faces		Faruk Afolabi Lassaki	Nigeria
Zimbabwe		Darrell Roodt	South Africa
Ordinary Boys	Chicos normales	Daniel Hernandez	Spain
Dot	Nokta	Derviş Zaim	Turkey
Mozlym		Edreace Purmul	United States
Shades of Ray		Jaffar Mahmood	United States/Pakistan

== Arab Competition ==
The following films were screened in the Arab Competition for Feature Films category.

English title	Original title	Director(s)	Country
Men's Affair		Amine Kais	Algeria/United States
Mascarades	مسخرة	Lyes Salem	Algeria/France
Adhen		Rabah Ameur-Zaïmeche	Algeria/France
Four Girls	أربع فتيات	Hussein El Hulaibi	Bahrain
Basra	بصرة	Ahmed Rashwan	Egypt
Fawzeya's Secret Recipe	خلطة فوزية	Magdy Ahmed Ali	Egypt
Swimming Bolteya	بلطية العايمة	Ali Ragab	Egypt
Number One	رقم واحد	Zakia Tahri	Morocco
Laila's Birthday	عيد ميلاد ليلى	Rachid Masharawy	Palestine
Salt of this Sea	ملح هذا البحر	Annemarie Jacir	Palestine
Hassiba	حسيبة	Raymond Boutros	Syria
Days of Boredom	أيام الضجر	Abdellatif Abdelhamid	Syria
The Accident	حادثة	Rachid Ferchiou	Tunisia
Five	خمسة	Karim Dridi	Tunisia/France

== Films out of competition ==
The following films were screened out of the competition.

English title	Original title	Director(s)	Country
The Homecoming	Μπαρ Φλωμπέρ	Vassilis Douvlis	Greece
The Last Year		Rituparno Gosh	India
Ocean of an Old Man		Rajesh Shera	India
The Sea Within	Ore Kadal	Shyamaprasad	India
Taj Mahal: An Eternal Love Story		Akbar Khan	India
The Demons of St. Petersburg	I demoni di San Pietroburgo	Giuliano Montaldo	Italy
Gomorra		Matteo Garrone	Italy
All the Women in My Life	Tutte le donne della mia vita	Simona Izzo	Italy
Teo's Voyage	El viajo de Teo	Walter Doehner	Mexico
The Tour	Турнеја	Goran Marković	Serbia
Promise Me This	Завет	Emir Kusturica	Serbia/France
Three Monkeys	Üç Maymun	Nuri Bilge Ceylan	Turkey
It's a Free World...		Ken Loach	United Kingdom
Battle In Seattle		Stuart Townsend	United States
Into the Wild		Sean Penn	United States
Margot at the Wedding		Noah Baumbach	United States

== Juries ==
=== International Competition ===
- Imanol Uribe, Spanish director (President)
- Mohamed Khan, Egyptian director
- Dalia El Behiry, Egyptian Actress
- Grazia Volpi, Italian Producer
- Mahmood Ali-Balogun, Nigerian Director
- Sophie Ndaba, South African actress
- Suzan Najm El Din, Syrian actress
- Gungor Bayrak, Turkish actress
- Anthony Sloman, English director

=== Digital Competition ===
- Tarek Al Eryan, Egyptian director (President)
- Karl Baumgartner, German producer
- Silvia Ferreri, Italian actress
- Hisham Al Ghanim, Kuwaiti filmmaker
- Rahmatou Keita, Nigerien director and screenwriter
- Eugen Serbanescu, Romanian editor and screenwriter
- Wayne Drew, English critic

=== Arab Competition ===
- Jean Chamoun, Lebanese director (President)
- Djamila Sahraoui, Algerian director
- Sherif Mounir, Egyptian actor
- Sawsan Badr, Egyptian actress
- Daoud Aoulad-Syad, Moroccan director

== Awards ==
The winners of the 2008 Cairo International Film Festival were:

- Golden Pyramid: Retorno a Hansala by Chus Gutiérrez
- Sliver Pyramid: Los by Jan Verheyen
- Best Director: Pernille Fischer Christensen for Dansen
- Saad El-Din Wahba Prize (Best Screenplay):
  - Bram Renders for Los
  - Safy Nebbou & Cyril Gomez-Mathieu for L'empreinte de l'ange
- Best Actor: Juan Diego Botto for El Greco
- Best Actress: Yolande Moreau for Séraphine
- Naguib Mahfouz Prize (Best Second Work): Safy Nebbou for L'empreite de l'ange
- Youssef Chahine Prize (Best Artistic Contribution): Oliver Pavlus for Tandoori Love
- Special Mention:
  - Finding Shangri-La by Ismene Ting (For Cinematography)
  - Los girasoles ciegos by José Luis Cuerda
- Best Arabic Film: Mascarades by Lyes Salem
- Best Arabic Screenplay:
  - Rachid Masharawy for Laila's Birthday
  - Basra for Ahmed Rashwan
- Golden Award for Digital Films: Nokta by Derviş Zaim
- Silver Award for Digital Films: Goodbye by Bunyo Kimura
- FIPRESCI Prize: Chus Gutiérrez for Retorno a Hansala
