= 31st Cairo International Film Festival =

Egyptian film festival in 2007

- 31st CIFF Official Poster
- Location: Cairo, Egypt
- Founded: 1976
- Awards: Golden Pyramid
- Festival date: November 27 – December 7, 2007
- Website: http://www.cairofilmfest.org/

The 31st annual Cairo International Film Festival was held from November 27 to December 7, 2007. English director Nicolas Roeg was the president of the jury.

== Films in competition ==
The following films competed for the Golden Pyramid.

English title	Original title	Director(s)	Country
The Seventh Heaven	ألوان السما السبعة	Saad Hendawi	Egypt
On Air	ع الهوا	Ihab Lamei	Egypt
Intimate Enemies	L'ennmie intime	Florent Emilio Siri	France
No Mercy	Nincs kegyelem	Elemér Ragályi	Hungary
Life in a Metro		Anurag Basu	India
I, the Other	Io, l'altro	Mohsen Melliti	Italy
Opera	Ópera	Juan Patricio Riveroll	Mexico
Waiting For Pasolini	في انتظار باسوليني	Daoud Aoulad-Syad	Morocco
The Lost Beauty	الجمال المفقود	Lahcen Zinoun	Morocco
In The Name of God	خدا کے لیے	Shoaib Mansoor	Pakistan
Ataul: For Rent		Neal 'Buboy' Tan	Philippines
Jasminum	Jaśminum	Jan Jakub Kolski	Poland
An Angel Hooked On Me	Îngerul necesar	Gheorghe Preda	Romania
A Full Breath	Полное дыхание	Valery Pendrakovsky	Russia
Moon in the Bottle	La luna en Bottella	Grojo	Spain
Kicks		Albert Ter Heerdt	Netherlands
Waiting For Heaven	Cenneti Beklerken	Derviş Zaim	Turkey
And When Did You Last See Your Father?		Anand Tucker	United Kingdom
Seachd: The Inaccessible Pinnacle		Simon Miller	Scotland

== Digital Competition ==
The following films were screened in the Digital Competition for Feature Films category.

English title	Original title	Director(s)	Country
Ararat: 14 Views		Don Askarian	Armenia
The Deal	El trato	Francisco Norden	Colombia
LaBoom! Exclusive	LaBoom! Exklusiv	Jeffery Berlin Green	Germany
Sovia: Death Hospital		Robert Franke	Germany
Quijates		Rimmo Paladino	Italy
House of the Sleeping Beauties	眠れる美女	Akemi Tachibana	Japan
Marrakech Inshallah		Steffen Pierce & Christian Pierce	Morocco
Little Moth	血蝉	Peng Tao	China
The High Cost of Living		Leonard Lai Yok Wai	Singapore
The Englishman		Ian Sellar	United Kingdom
American Combatant		Charles Libin	United States
For Never		Adam Zayed	United States

== Arab Competition ==
The following films were screened in the Arab Competition for Feature Films category.

English title	Original title	Director(s)	Country
The Yellow House	البيت الأصفر	Amor Hakkar	Algeria/France
Délice Paloma		Nadir Moknèche	Algeria/France
Summer of '62	Cartouches Gauloises	Mehdi Charef	Algeria/France
Demons of Cairo	الغابة	Ahmed Atef	Egypt
Girls	بلد البنات	Amr Bayoumi	Egypt
The Seventh Heaven	ألوان السما السبعة	Saad Hendawi	Egypt
On Air	ع الهوا	Ihab Lamei	Egypt
Caramel	سكر بنات	Nadine Labaki	Lebanon
Waiting for Pasolini	في انتظار باسوليني	Daoud Aoulad-Syad	Morocco
The Lost Beauty	الجمال المفقود	Lahcen Zinoun	Morocco
The Satanic Angels	ملائكة الشيطان	Ahmed Boulane	Morocco
Out of Coverage	خارج التغطية	Abdellatif Abdelhamid	Syria
I.D.	الهوية	Ghassan Chmeit	Syria

== Films out of competition ==
The following films were screened out of the competition.

English title	Original title	Director(s)	Country
Warden of the Dead	Пазачът на мъртвите	Ilian Simeonov	Bulgaria
Upside Down	Превртено	Igor Ivanov Izy	Macedonia
Boxes		Jane Birkin	France
In the Name of Father	به نام پدر	Ebrahim Hatamikia	Iran
Preserve	Rezerwat	Łukasz Palkowski	Poland
Attack On Leningrad	Ленинграда	Aleksandr Buravsky	Russia
Rendition		Gavin Hood	United States
A Mighty Heart		Michael Winterbottom	United States

== Juries ==
=== International Competition ===
- Nicolas Roeg, English director (President)
- Zhang Jingchu, Chinese actress
- Hesham Selim, Egyptian actor
- Sandra Nashaat, Egyptian director
- Ildikó Enyedi, Hungarian director
- Tilde Corsi, Italian producer
- Moon So-ri, South Korean actress
- Jillali Ferhati, Moroccan director and screenwriter
- Krzysztof Zanussi, Polish director and screenwriter
- Mahamat Saleh Haroun, Chadian director
- Nurgül Yeşilçay, Turkish actress

=== Digital Competition ===
- Mohamed Abdel Aziz, Egyptian director (President)
- Michel Alexandre, French Screenwriter
- Tilman Scheel, German CEO
- Antonio Pizzo, Italian professor
- Naky Sy Savané, Ivoirian actress
- Peter Scarlet, American director of Tribeca Film Festival

=== Arab Competition ===
- Ahmed Al Maanouni, Moroccan director (President)
- Moufida Tlatli, Tunisian director
- Jamal Soliman, Syrian actor
- Hala Khalil, Egyptian director
- Samir Farag, Egyptian cinematographer

== Awards ==
The winners of the 2007 Cairo International Film Festival were:

- Golden Pyramid: L'ennmie intime by Florent Emilio Siri
- Silver Pyramid: Khuda Kay Liye by Shoaib Mansoor
- Best Director: Florent Emilio Siri for L'ennmie intime
- Saad El-Din Wahba Prize (Best Screenplay): Albert Ter Heerdt for Kicks
- Best Actor: Albert Dupontel for L'ennmie intime
- Best Actress:
  - Marina Magro for Ópera
  - Tatyana Lyutaeva for Polnoe Dykhanie
- Naguib Mahfouz Prize (Best Directorial Debut): Juan Patricio Riveroll for Ópera
- Youssef Chahine Prize (Best Artistic Contribution): Derviş Zaim for Cenneti Beklerken
- Special Mention: Matthew Beard for And When Did You Last See Your Father? (For Acting)
- Best Arabic Film: Waiting For Pasolini by Daoud Aoulad-Syad
- Arabic Film Special Mention:
  - The Seventh Heaven by Saad Hendawi
  - Caramel by Nadine Labaki
- Golden Award for Digital Films: Xue chan by Peng Tao
- Silver Award for Digital Films: The Englishman by Ian Sellar
- FIPRESCI Prize: Juan Patricio Riveroll for Ópera
