= 2nd Asian Film Awards =

2008 edition of award ceremony

- Awarded for: Excellence in Asian cinema
- Awarded by: Hong Kong International Film Festival
- Presented on: March 17, 2008
- Site: Hong Kong Convention and Exhibition Centre
- Official website: Asian Film Awards

Highlights
- Best Picture: Secret Sunshine
- Best Direction: Lee Chang-dong; Secret Sunshine
- Best Actor: Tony Leung Chiu-wai; Lust, Caution
- Best Actress: Jeon Do-yeon; Secret Sunshine
- Most awards: 3 - Secret Sunshine
- Most nominations: 6 - Lust, Caution and The Warlords

The 2nd Asian Film Awards were given in a ceremony on 17 March 2008 at the Hong Kong Convention and Exhibition Centre as part of the Hong Kong International Film Festival. The top winner was Secret Sunshine from South Korea, which won Best Film, Best Director for Lee Chang-dong and Best Actress for Jeon Do-yeon. Secret Sunshine had been nominated for four awards.

The top nominees were Lust, Caution by Ang Lee and The Warlords by Peter Chan, both with six nominations each. Tony Leung Chiu Wai, star of Lust, Caution won Best Actor, while The Warlords won the award for best visual effects. The Sun Also Rises by Jiang Wen had five nominations, and it won the prize for Best Supporting Actress, Joan Chen, who was also nominated for best actress for The Home Song Stories. Japan's I Just Didn't Do It had four nominations.

For this year, the awards categories were expanded from 10 to 12 to include nominations for best supporting actor and best supporting actress. The awards were sponsored by Mission Hills Golf Club.

== Controversy ==
A reported Chinese media ban kept Lust, Caution lead actress Tang Wei from attending the ceremony.

== Winners and nominees ==
=== Best Film ===
- Winner: Secret Sunshine (South Korea)
  - Buddha Collapsed Out of Shame (Iran)
  - I Just Didn't Do It (Japan)
  - Lust, Caution (Taiwan/ China)
  - The Sun Also Rises (China/Hong Kong)
  - The Warlords (China/Hong Kong)

=== Best Director ===
- Winner: Lee Chang-dong, Secret Sunshine (South Korea)
  - Peter Chan, The Warlords (China/Hong Kong)
  - Jiang Wen, The Sun Also Rises (China/Hong Kong)
  - Ang Lee, Lust, Caution (Taiwan/ China)
  - Masayuki Suo, I Just Didn't Do It (Japan)
  - Zhang Lu, Desert Dream (South Korea)

=== Best Actor ===
- Winner: Tony Leung Chiu Wai, Lust, Caution (Taiwan/ China)
  - Jack Kao, God Man Dog (Taiwan)
  - Ryō Kase, I Just Didn't Do It (Japan)
  - Jet Li, The Warlords (China/Hong Kong)
  - Joe Odagiri, Tokyo Tower: Mom and Me, and Sometimes Dad (Japan)
  - Song Kang-ho, Secret Sunshine (South Korea)

=== Best Actress ===
- Winner: Jeon Do-yeon, Secret Sunshine (South Korea)
  - Joan Chen, The Home Song Stories (Singapore)
  - Kiki Kirin, Tokyo Tower: Mom and Me, and Sometimes Dad (Japan)
  - Yunjin Kim, Seven Days (South Korea)
  - Deepika Padukone, Om Shanti Om (India)
  - Tang Wei, Lust, Caution (Taiwan/ China)

=== Best Supporting Actor ===
- Winner:Sun Honglei, Mongol (Mongolia/ Kazakhstan)
  - Chun Ho-jin, Skeletons in the Closet (South Korea)
  - Kaoru Kobayashi, Tokyo Tower: Mom and Me, and Sometimes Dad (Japan)
  - Mario Maurer, The Love of Siam (Thailand)
  - Shin'ichi Tsutsumi, Always: Sunset on Third Street 2 (Japan)

=== Best Supporting Actress ===
- Winner: Joan Chen, The Sun Also Rises (China/Hong Kong)
  - Gong Hyo-jin, Happiness (South Korea)
  - Kim Hye-soo, Skeletons in the Closet (South Korea)
  - Apinya Sakuljaroensuk, Ploy (Thailand)
  - Hiroko Yakushimaru, Always: Sunset on Third Street 2 (Japan)

=== Best Screenwriter ===
- Winner: Au Kin-Yee and Wai Ka-Fai, Mad Detective (Hong Kong)
  - Im Sang-soo, The Old Garden (South Korea)
  - Peng Tao, Little Moth (China)
  - James Schamus and Wang Hui-Ling, Lust, Caution (Taiwan/ China)
  - Suo Masayuki, I Just Didn't Do It (Japan)

=== Best Cinematographer ===
- Winner: Liao Pen-jung, Help Me Eros (Taiwan)
  - Hooman Behmanesh, Those Three (Iran)
  - Chankit Chamnivikaipong, Ploy (Thailand)
  - Shanker Raman, Frozen (India)
  - Arthur Wong, The Warlords (China/Hong Kong)

=== Best Production Designer ===
- Winner: Cao Jiuping and Zhang Jian Qun, The Sun Also Rises (China/Hong Kong)
  - Kim Yu-jeong and Lee Min-bok, Epitaph (Gidam) (South Korea)
  - Iwaki Namiko, Sakuran (Japan)
  - Pisut Pariwattanakit and Thanakorn Pongsuwan, Opapatika (Thailand)
  - Tsai Ming-liang, Help Me Eros (Taiwan)

=== Best Composer ===
- Winner: Vishal Dadlani, Shekhar Ravjiani, Pyarelal Ramprasad Sharma, Om Shanti Om (India)
  - The August Band, Flure, Witwisit Hirunwongkul, Chukiat Sakweerakul and Passakorn Wiroonsup, The Love of Siam (Thailand)
  - Alexandre Desplat, Lust, Caution (Taiwan/ China)
  - Xiao He, Mid-Afternoon Barks (China)
  - Ringo Shiina, Sakuran (Japan)

=== Best Editor ===
- Winner: David Richardson, Eye in the Sky (Hong Kong)
  - Charliebebs Gohetia, Slingshot (Philippines)
  - Shogo Hirasawa, Maiko Haaaan!!! (Japan)
  - Lee Eun-soo, The Old Garden (South Korea)
  - Wenders Li, The Warlords (China/Hong Kong)

=== Best Visual Effects ===
- Winner: Ng Yuen Fai, The Warlords (China/Hong Kong)
  - Hyung Rae Shim, D-War (South Korea)
  - Thomas Duval, The Sun Also Rises (China/Hong Kong)
  - Seshita Hiroyuki, Dainipponjin (Japan)
  - Takashi Yamazaki, Always: Sunset on Third Street 2 (Japan)
