= 36th Cairo International Film Festival =

Egyptian film festival in 2014

- Opening film: November 9, 2014
- Closing film: November 18, 2014
- Location: Cairo Citadel, Cairo, Egypt
- Film titles: 155
- Editor-in-chief: Yousra

The 36th Cairo International Film Festival (Arabic: مهرجان القاهرة السينمائي السادس والثلاثون) was held from November 9–18, 2014, including 17 films from ten Arab countries. Six films featured were nominated for the 87th Academy Awards the following year. The jury included four male and four female filmmakers representing the Middle East, Asia, Africa, and Europe as well as the disciplines of direction, screenwriting, production, cinematography, and criticism, headed by Egyptian actress Yousra.

== Background ==
Festival management chose Yousra as the first Egyptian jury chair in the history of the Festival. animated and a documentary films also made their first appearances with one of each. Another unprecedented move was hiring an Egyptian designer, Karim Adam, to design the official poster, featuring local actress Nadia Lutfi.

Lutfi received a special Lifetime Achievement Award during the opening ceremony, and the Festival prepared a documentary on her career that was shown on the second day. The first submissions in Festival history opened from the United Arab Emirates (Ali F. Mostafa’s From A to B) and Iran (Abed Abest’s The Corner).

=== Egyptian films featured ===
Six Egyptian films were featured at the Festival. The International Features category included Karim Hanafi’s Bab Al-Wadaa (“The Farewell Gate”), starring Salwa Khattab and Ahmed Magdy. The Short Film category featured Ahmed Abdalla’s Décor, starring Kal Naga and Horeya Farghaly, along with Mouhamed Rady’s Wall of Heroism. The Classics category showed a restored version of Henry Barakat’s 1965 film The Sin in honor of what would have been his 100th birthday. Finally, the late director and singer-actor Hussein al-Imam’s black-and-white film Like a Matchstick was screened.

== Juries ==
=== International Competition ===
- Yousra, Egyptian actress (Chair)
- Wang Xiaoshuai, Chinese director, whose Red Amnesia was screened here and at the 71st Venice International Film Festival the same year
- Haile Gerima, Ethiopian director
- Corinne van Egeraat, Dutch actress-writer-producer
- Ibrahim Al-Ariss, Lebanese critic
- Alexis Grivas, Greek cinematographer
- Dominique Cabrera, French director
- Mariam Naoum, Egyptian screenwriter
- Nancy Abdel-Fattah, Egyptian cinematographer

=== International Critics’ Week ===
- Laila Elwi, Egyptian actress (Chair)
- Mohamed Reda, Lebanese critic
- Najib Ayyad, Tunisian producer

=== Horizons of Arab Cinema ===
- Khamis Al-Khayati, Tunisian critic (Chair)
- Deborah Young, American critic
- Barbara Löwe, German critic

== Films ==
=== International ===
Films featured
Title	Director	Country
Bab Al-Wadaa	Karim Hanafi	Egypt
Eyes of a Thief	Najwa Najjar	Palestine
Through a Lens Darkly	Thomas Allen Harris	United States
We Come as Friends	Hubert Sauper	France
Boy and the World	Alê Abreu	Brazil
Charlie's Country	Rolf de Heer	Australia
Love at First Fight	Thomas Cailley	France
Red, Blue, Yellow	Nujoom Al-Ghanem	United Arab Emirates
Giovanni's Island	Mizuho Nishikubo	Japan
Forever	Margarita Manda	Greece
And There Was Evening and There Was Morning	Emanuele Caruso	Italy
Sand Dollars	Laura Amelia Guzmán and Israel Cárdenas	Dominican Republic
Melbourne	Nima Javidi	Iran
Five Star	Keith Miller	United States
Miss Brackets, the Baby-sitter, the Bastard Grandson, and Emma Suarez	Sergio Candel	Spain
The Blinding Sunlight	Yu Liu	China

=== International Critics’ Week ===
Films featured
Title	Director	Country
* No One's Child	Vuk Ršumović	Serbia/Croatia
* Costa da Morte	Lois Patiño	Galicia (Spain)
* Viktoria	Maya Vitkova	Bulgaria
* Hold Your Breath Like a Lover	Kohei Igarashi	Japan
* Brides	Tinatin Kajrishvili	Georgia
* The Iranian Film	Yassine El Idrissi	Morocco
* Dancing with Maria	Ivan Gergolet	Italy/Argentina

== Awards ==
=== International Competition ===
- Golden Pyramid Award: Melbourne, Nima Javidi
- Silver Pyramid for Best Director: Forever, Margarita Manda
- Silver Pyramid for Best Screenplay, Boy and the World, Alê Abreu
- Silver Pyramid for Best Artistic Contribution: Bab Al-Wadaa, cinematographer Zaki Aref
- Best Actor: Eyes of a Thief, Kal Naga
- Best Actress: Love at First Fight, Adele Hamlin

=== International Critics’ Week ===
The following were unanimously announced:

- Shadi Abdeslam Prize: No One's Child, Vuk Ršumović
- Fathi Farag Award for Best Artistic Contribution: Brides, Tinatin Kajrishvili

=== Prospects of Arab Movies ===
- Saad Eddine Wahba Prize (Best Artistic Contribution): Sotto Voce, Kamal Kamal (Morocco)
- Youssef Chahine Award (Best Artistic Creativity): Bab Al-Wadaa, Zaki Aref
- Salah Abu Seif Award (Best Arabic Film): Scheherazade's Diary, Zeina Daccache (Lebanon)
- Special Certificate of Appreciation: Theeb
- Naguib Mahfouz Awards (Golden Pyramid of Honor):
  - Volker Schlöndorff, German director
  - Noureddine Saïl, Egyptian cinematographer
  - Nadia Lutfi, Egyptian actress
