= Nebbou =

Nebbou is a surname. Notable people with the surname include:

- Mehdi Nebbou (born 1971), French actor
- Safy Nebbou (born 1968), French actor and director
