= No One's Normal When You're Near =

- Spanish: De cerca nadie es normal
- Directed by: Marcelo Mosenson
- Written by: Marcelo Mosenson; Liliana Nadal
- Produced by: Marcelo Mosenson
- Cinematography: Guido Lublinsky
- Edited by: Liliana Nadal
- Music by: Pablo Sala
- Production company: Nomade Films
- Release date: May 2009
- Country: Argentina
- Language: Spanish

No One's Normal When You're Near is a feature film directed and written in 2008 by Marcelo Mosenson and produced by Nomade Films, which is currently seeking distribution.

== Festival Run ==
Official Selection, Competition for Digital Feature Films, Cairo International Film Festival.

Selected to take part in the Festival del Cinema Latinoamericano de Trieste, Italy and the MARFICI 2009 (Mar del Plata International Independent Film Festival).

It participates in the Mercato Internazionale del Film of the Festival Internazionale del Film di Roma.

Shown at The Lee Strasberg Theatre & Film Institute in NYC, the Festival Transterritorial de Cine Underground in Buenos Aires, and the Centro Cultural Recoleta, in Buenos Aires.

== Synopsis ==
First Argentinean movie entirely improvised.

Thirteen friends meet to celebrate Vicky's birthday. This is the first time that most of them gather together again. Resentments, guilt, pain and the fiction of their own memories are being revealed along the night.

Only a few moments before Vicky blows her birthday's cake we understand that her brother had died in a car accident the night of her birthday's party three years earlier.

== Crew ==
- Director: Marcelo Mosenson
- Script: Marcelo Mosenson & Liliana Nadal
- Photography: Guido Lublinsky
- Editing: Liliana Nadal
- Acting Coach: Roxana Randón
- Art Direction: Sabrina Suárez
- Sound: Andrés Pepe Estrada
- Music and Sound Mix: Pablo Sala
- Production Company: Nomade Films

== Cast ==
- Soledad Arocena (Soledad)
- Paula Carreira (Abril)
- María Cruz (Vicky)
- Adrián Fernández (Julian)
- Gisela Gambetta (Valentina)
- Sebastián Gonella (Diego)
- Alejandra Lapola (Sofia)
- Luís Mamud (Raul)
- Viviana Pasquarelli (Laura)
- Hernán Rambaldi (Ezequiel)
- Bianca Randon (Monica)
- Daniel Roperto (Ivo)
- Ignacio Zaldarriaga (Franco)
