= Golden Pyramid Award =

Egyptian film award

The Golden Pyramid Award is the highest prize for best film in the international competition of the Cairo International Film Festival, hosted annually in Cairo, Egypt.

== Winners and nominees ==
Year	Winners	Ref.
1991 (15th)	The Object of Beauty	
1992 (16th)	Those Left Behind	
1993 (17th)	Curfew	
1994 (18th)	Colonel Chabert	
1995 (19th)	The Flor Contemplacion Story	
1996 (20th)	A Girl Called Apple	
1997 (21st)	The Chambermaid on the Titanic	
1998 (22nd)	Malli	
1999 (23rd)	A Major Inconvenience	
2000 (24th)	Sigh	
2001 (25th)	Pauline and Paulette	
2001 (25th)	Daughters of This Century	
2002 (26th)	The Last Blues	
2003 (27th)	The King	
2004 (28th)	Guardians of the Clouds	
2005 (29th)	Mother of Mine	
2006 (30th)	The Road	
2007 (31st)	Intimate Enemies	
2008 (32nd)	Return to Hansala	
2009 (33rd)	Letters to Father Jacob	
2010 (34th)	Lust	
2012 (35th)	Rendez-vous in Kiruna	
2014 (36th)	Melbourne	
2015 (37th)	Mediterranea	
2016 (38th)	Mimosas	
2017 (39th)	The Intruder	
2018 (40th)	A Twelve-Year Night	
2019 (41st)	I'm No Longer Here	
2020 (42nd)	Limbo	
2021 (43rd)	The Hole in the Fence	
2022 (44th)	Alam	
2024 (45th)	The New Year That Never Came	
2025 (46th)	Dragonfly	

== Bibliography ==
- Jane Sloan (2007-03-26). Reel Women: An International Directory of Contemporary Feature Films about Women. Bloomsbury Publishing PLC. ISBN 978-1-4616-7082-7.
