= Marcelo Mosenson =

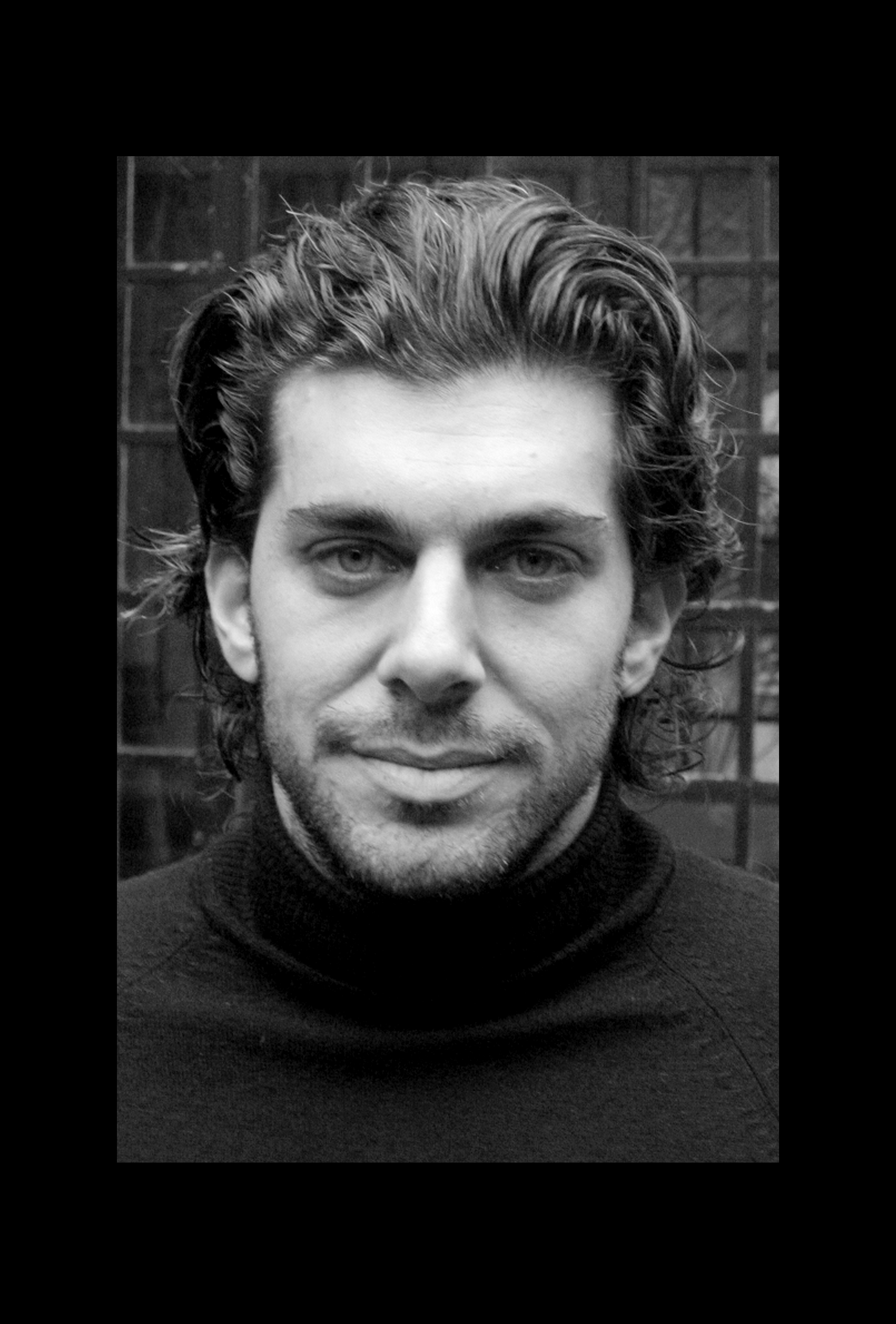
Marcelo Mosenson.

Marcelo Mosenson is the founder and executive director of the film production company Nomade Films.

Mosensen was born in Buenos Aires in 1969. He traveled to Paris at the age of 20 where he met his mentor, cinematographer Ricardo Aronovich. He worked as his assistant on a number of films in France and Argentina. They wrote the book Exponer una historia: la fotografía cinematográfica (Exposing a Story: the cinematographic photography), originally published in Spanish by Gedisa, and most recently in French by Dujarris and in Portuguese by Griphus.

Before returning to Argentina, he has worked for filmmaker, Costa Gavras, in the film La petite apocalypse (The Little Apocalypse).

Upon his return to Argentina he made two award-winning documentaries Bajo el mismo techo (Under the Same Roof, 1996) and Nadie se parece tanto a si mismo como cuando intenta ser distinto (The more you try to be different, the more you look like yourself, 1997)

In 1998 he received a grant from the Argentine National Fund for the Arts in conjunction with the U.S. Fulbright Foundation. Two years later he receives a national Antorchas grant which supported him in obtaining a master's degree in Film at The New School University (NYC). In New York he taught scriptwriting at Ramapo College while working for New York Times Television (NYTTV) collaborating on the production of various documentaries.

== Nomade Films ==
He returned to Argentina in 2003 and created his film production company, Nomade Films. Nomade Films produced the play, Amanecí y tu no estabas (2007), directed by Alicia Zanca. It also produced the award-winning short film Vecinos (Neighbors, 2006). written and directed by Marcelo Mosenson; and his first feature, De cerca nadie es normal (No one’s normal when you’re near, 2008), which he wrote and directed.

He is currently working with Executive Producer Mario Levit, on the funding of his feature film, Lágrimas (Tears).

Tears’ script participated in the Sundance Lab (U.S.), the Film Lab organized by the Fundación Antorchas (Argentina) with the support of the Hubert Bals Fund and the Göteborg Film Festival Fund. Tears also got into the finals of the script competition organized by the Foundation Emergence (France). The movie also participated in the First Mercosur Producers Market in Buenos Aires, the IV International Film and Audiovisual Seminar, SEMCINE 2008 in Salvador, Brazil, and in the International Co-Production Encounters and Lab of the Cartagena International Film Festival in March 2009.

Mosensen is planning to take part in the jury of the 2009 Cairo International Film Festival.

== Current projects ==
=== Lágrimas (Tears) ===
Narrative Drama (2010)

Script: Marcelo Mosenson & Pablo Del Teso

Direction: Marcelo Mosenson

Currently seeking funding

Tears was chosen amongst 5 Latin-American projects to attend the scriptwriting workshop organized by The Sundance Institute in Barcelona. At the same time it was selected by The Antorchas Foundation (Buenos Aires) in collaboration with The Hübert Bals Fund and The Göteborg Film Festival Fund to participate of the workshop for feature film analysis. It also took part in the pitching sessions at The Buenos Aires Lab of The Buenos Aires International Independent Film Festival (BAFICI). Tears was also finalist of the Emergence Contest in Paris, presided by actor Gérard Depardieu. It has recently participated of The First Mercosur Producers Market in Buenos Aires, the IV International Film and Audiovisual Seminar, SEMCINE 2008 in Salvador, Brazil, and was selected to participate in the International Co-Production Encounters and Lab of the Cartagena International Film Festival in March 2009.

=== Rody ===
(Production Title)

Fiction (2010)

Script: Marcelo Mosenson Co-Writer : Santiago Kovadloff

Director: Marcelo Mosenson

Currently in script and project development.

=== La Piel (The Skin) ===
(Production Title)

Documentary (2010)

Producer | Director: Marcelo Mosenson

Currently seeking funding.

The skin was chosen to participate in the DocBsAs Documentary Forum, and its pitching sessions for project development.

=== De Cerca nadie es normal (No one’s normal when you’re near) ===
Fiction (2008)

Script and Direction: Marcelo Mosenson

Video / Color / 84 min.

Currently seeking distribution.

Official Selection, Competition for Digital Feature Films, Cairo International Film Festival.

Selected to take part in the Festival del Cinema Latinoamericano de Trieste, Italy and the MARFICI 2009 (Mar del Plata International Independent Film Festival).

It participates in the Mercato Internazionale del Film of the Festival Internazionale del Film di Roma.

Shown at The Lee Strasberg Theatre & Film Institute in NYC, the Festival Transterritorial de Cine Underground in Buenos Aires, and the Centro Cultural Recoleta, in Buenos Aires.

== Filmography, Prizes and Festivals ==
=== Vecinos (Neighbors) ===
Narrative Drama

Script and Direction: Marcelo Mosenson

Super 16 mm / Color / 20 min.

It received the Special Jury Prize in the Sixth Edition of the University of Verano (France) organized by the Franco-American Cultural Fund, sponsored by the DGA (Directors Guild of America), the MPA (Motion Picture Association), SACEM (Société des Auteurs, Compositeurs et Editeurs de Musique), and the WGA (Writers Guild of America). It participated in several international film festivals such as: Carrefour des Cinémas festival, Paris, 2005. The XVIII Argentinian Conference of Independent Film and Video of UNCIPAR, Buenos Aires, 2006.

It also participated in The International Film Festival of Sax (May, 2006), The Iberamerican Competition of the Huesca International Film Festival (June, 2006), and The International Festival of Independent Cinema of Elche (Julio, 2006). It was also invited to participate in the prestigious International Short film Competition of the Nation of Bidasoa (Navarra, Spain) and The El Ojo Cojo Film Festival of Madrid.

Vecinos was screened at the Cannes Film Festival Market (May, 2006).

Vecinos was screened in the 3rd Argentinische Filmtage, Leipzig (Argentinian Cinema Showcase in Leipzig, Germany), 2009

==== TV Broadcasting ====
IFC (The Independent Film Channel, USA-Canada) programmed it for its 2008-2009 schedule.

I.Sat (Argentina): programmed it for its 2007-2008 schedule.

MovieOla

=== Nadie se parece tanto a sí mismo como cuanto intenta ser distinto (The more you try to be different, the more you look like yourself) ===
Documentary

Producer | Director: Marcelo Mosenson

Video - Color - 47 min.

In 1998 it received an award from the Secretary of Culture of the Nation of Argentina.

Among the festivals in which it participated were: The Latino Festival of Montreal (2000), The International Festival of Uruguay in Montevideo (1997), and The II International Theater Festival of Buenos Aires (1999).

It was also screened at The Recoleta Cultural Center (1998), The Filmoteca of Buenos Aires (1999), the exhibition of Independent Films of the Cities (1999) and The VI Santa Fe Film and Video Exhibition (1998).

=== Bajo un mismo techo (Under the Same Roof) ===
Documentary

Producer | Director: Marcelo Mosenson

Video - B & W - 52 min.

Shot in Buenos Aires and Paraguay in 1996. It won the First Prize at the XV International Film Festival of Uruguay in Montevideo (1997), the Special Jury Prize at the First Documentary Film Festival of Avellaneda in Buenos Aires (1997), and the First Prize at the VI Video Festival of Buenos Aires (1997).

It also participated in The Havana Film Festival, in Cuba in December 1996, the International Human Rights Festival of Latin America in Buenos Aires in March 1997, The VI Exhibition of Venezuela organized by its National Library in September, 1998, in The Santa Fe Film and Video Exhibition in December 1997, the exhibition of Independent Films of the Cities (1999) and The Filmoteca of Buenos Aires (1999).

In 1996 it was screened at the Recoleta Cultural Center and the Ricardo Rojas Cultural Center in Buenos Aires.

It was also broadcast by El Canal de la Mujer in 1996/1997 and was programmed for the 2009 season of Canal 7 Argentina.
