= Khaled El Hagar =

Egyptian film director

- Education: Cairo University
- Occupation: film director

Khaled El Hagar is an Egyptian film director.

== Education ==
He studied law at Cairo University and has worked in film since 1985. His first short film, You Are My Life (1985), won best film award at the Oberhausen festival. He then completed a postgraduate degree at the National Film and Television School, and directed his second short film, "Doody's Dream". His first feature, "Little Dreams", was screened at 37 festivals and won awards at Birmingham, Amiens, and FESPACO in Burkina Faso.

== Career ==
He moved to Birmingham, UK, in the 1990s, and has become well known on the film scene in the city, screening new films and collecting awards in the Birmingham International Film Festival. Recent years have seen a growing acceptance in Cairo, where he has been filming regularly, producing multi-award winning movies, and becoming established as an important Director in the Arabic world.

ROOM TO RENT, a comedy drama made in 2001, was his first feature as writer/director. It has won numerous awards, four of them for Best Film., starring Juliette Lewis and French actor Said Taghmaoui, first brought Khaled's talents to the attention of the international film world.

The depth and the range of his films resonates powerfully with audiences, embracing multiple cultures and genres, and including comedy, dance, musicals and contemporary dramas.

The New York African Diaspora Film Festival 2009 honoured his work with a retrospective of his major films.

Already in receipt of 27 national and international film awards, Khaled El Hagar is among the most significant Egyptian filmmakers of the past two decades.

His graduation film "A GULF BETWEEN US", set in 1991 London during the Gulf War, caused an uproar in the Egyptian press when it was shown in Cairo in 1995. Khaled, who not only directed, but also starred in the film, was accused of promoting normalisation with Israel and could not return to Egypt until 2003.

"ELEMENTS OF MINE" a modern drama dance in English was shot in Berlin with choreographer Norbert Servos and cinematographer Andrew Catlin. The film won the First Prize - Moving Pictures Festival, Toronto (MoPix Award 2004).

In development: MOMO THE HERO & THE LADY VAMPIRE OF PIGALLE for producer Mark Shivas (Perpetual Motion Pictures) and SEX FOR HAPPINESS with Roger Shannon (Swish Productions/Screen West Midlands).

In December 2010, his most recent film El Shooq (Lust) won the Golden Pyramid Award for Best Film at Cairo's International Film Festival. It was the only Egyptian film in competition and the first time Egypt had won this award in 14 years. The film was selected as the Egyptian entry for the Best Foreign Language Film at the 84th Academy Awards, but it did not make the final shortlist.

== Personal life ==
He is married to Janice Rider, a freelance film/TV costume designer (ex BBC). Their son, Adam, is an actor and musician.
