= Alejandra Silva =

Spanish publicist (born 1983)

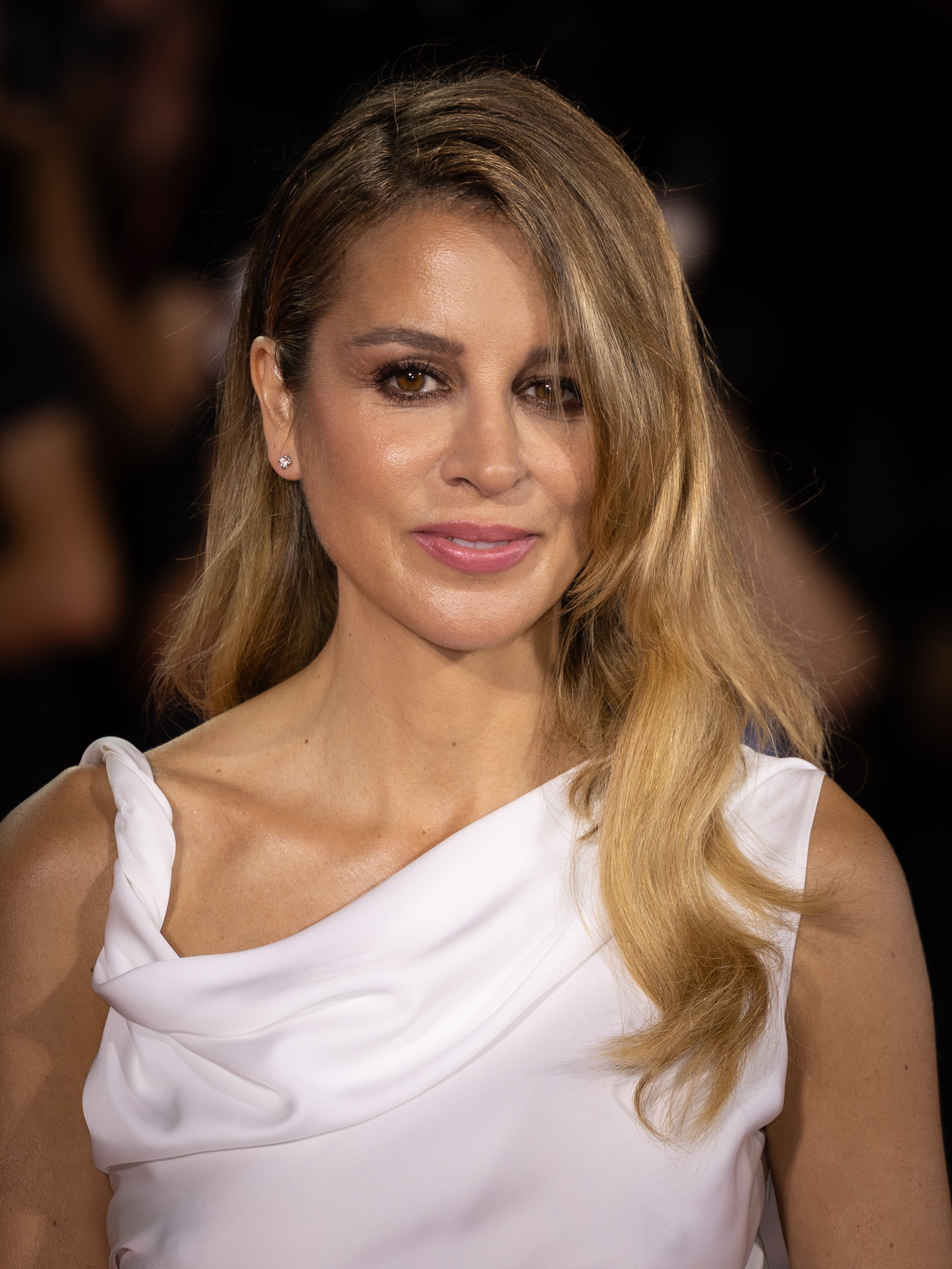
- Silva in 2024
- Born: Alejandra María Silva García-Baquero; 16 February 1983 (age 43); A Coruña, Galicia, Spain
- Occupation: Publicist
- Spouses: Govind Friedland (m. 2012; div. 2015) Richard Gere (m. 2018)
- Children: 3

Alejandra María Silva García-Baquero (born 16 February 1983) is a Spanish publicist and political activist.

== Early life and career ==
Silva was born in A Coruña to Ignacio Silva, a businessman and the former Vice President of Real Madrid Football Club. Silva worked as an intern in The Farm ad agency in Madrid, and in 2005 she accepted a position in sales and marketing at a private firm in the airplane industry.

== Philanthropy ==
In 2007, Silva promoted a nonprofit initiative jointly with Karolina Kurkova called Beautiful Life Fund, which raises awareness of the plight of children in need, distressed refugee children, victims of war, and the education of homeless children around the world.

In 2010, she participated in the Real Madrid Football Club Foundation African Initiative Project by creating soccer leagues as means of integrating underprivileged children to their local communities and promoting sports and its values amongst African families.

Through her interest in nonprofit organizations, Silva met American actor Richard Gere and began a relationship. As of 2016, Silva continues her activism in nonprofit organization and supports The Rais Foundation for the Homeless.

In 2016, she was the cover model of Hola! Fashion.

== Personal life ==
Silva and her first husband Govind Friedland, a mining magnate, had a son in 2012. The couple were in the process of divorce by October 2015, by which time Silva was in a relationship with American actor Richard Gere, a longtime family friend. She and Gere married in 2018 at Gere's estate in Pound Ridge, New York. The couple had a son in 2019. In April 2020, it was reported that Silva had given birth to a second son.
