= Cairo International Film Festival =

Annual film festival in Egypt

Cairo International Film Festival مهرجان القاهرة السينمائي الدولي
- Location: Cairo, Egypt
- Founded: 16 August 1976; 50 years ago
- Awards: Golden Pyramid Award
- Artistic director: Mohamed Tarek
- Festival date: 12-21 November
- Language: International
- Website: ciff.org.eg

The Cairo International Film Festival is an annual internationally accredited film festival held in Cairo, Egypt. Founded in 1976, the festival is the only international competitive feature film festival recognized by the FIAPF in Africa and the Arab world as well as the oldest in this category. The festival regularly draws tens of thousands of visitors each year. Cairo is held annually at the Cairo Opera House and under the auspices of the Egyptian Ministry of Culture.

About 150 films are shown at multiple venues across Cairo, mostly in and around Downtown Cairo. They are screened in nine sections across cinematic genres, with around twenty films competing for the festival's top awards in the Competition section. The major awards, called the Golden Pyramid and Silver Pyramid, are decided on by the international jury, chaired by an internationally recognisable cinema personality. This jury and other specialized CIFF juries also give many other awards, and in addition there are other awards given by independent juries and organizations.

== History ==
The Cairo International Film Festival (CIFF) is one of only 15 Festivals accorded as a category "A" status by the International Federation of Film Producers Associations FIAPF. It is the oldest internationally accredited cultural feature film festival in the Arab World, Africa and the Middle East.

The history of CIFF goes back to 1975, after a visit to the Berlin Film Festival the late writer-critic Kamal El Mallakh and a group of like-minded cinema critics wondered why such a world-class festival could not take place in Egypt. The country was still in Egyptian cinema's "Golden Age" and contained a formidable film industry, still the biggest in the Arab world. The Cairo International Film Festival was launched in 1976. The 1976 festival featured around 100 films from 33 countries, with 14 films from 14 different countries in competition.

The Egyptian Association of Film Writers and Critics headed the festival for the first seven years until 1983. In the following year, the Union of Artist's Syndicates supervised the festival, and after that point, several associations mustered their resources to run the festival. The Egyptian Association of Film Writers and Critics joined with the Ministry of Culture and the Union of Artist's Syndicates to form a joint committee in 1985 to improve the quality and financial state of the festival.

In 2023, The Cairo International Film Festival’s 45th edition was canceled due to the Gaza war.

== Awards ==
- The highest award given at CIFF is the Golden Pyramid Award awarded for Best Picture.
- Silver Pyramid and Bronze Pyramid Awards go to the Best Director and Best New Director respectively.
- The Best Screenplay award is named after the Nobel Prize winner Naguib Mahfouz.
- The festival also offers career achievement awards named after Egyptian actress Faten Hamama.
- The International Federation of Film Critics (FIPRESCI) Awards are announced at the closing ceremony of the festival.

The festival offers awards in specialized categories as well:

- The Horizons of Arab Cinema Competition, presented by the Egyptian Filmmakers Syndicate (EFMS), offers the Saad Eldin Wahba Award for Best Arabic Film and the Salah Abu Seif Award for Best Arab Artistic Contribution.
- The International Critics Week Competition for Feature and Documentary Films, presented by the Egyptian Film Critics Association (EFCA), offers the Shadi Abdel Salam Award for Best Film, awarded to the Director, and the Fathy Farag Award for Best Artistic Contribution, both awards.
- Cinema of Tomorrow, International Competition (CTIC) for Short Films offers the Youssef Chahine Award for Best Short Film, and The Special Jury Award.
- The Special Jury Award.

=== CIFF cash awards ===
- Youssef Cherif Rizkallah Award (Audience Award): 20,000$ (shared between the producer of the film and the Egyptian company distributing the film in Egypt). The Award will be granted to one of films selected in the International Competition
- Best Arab Film Award: 15,000$ presented to the producer of the film. The Award will be granted by a special jury to the best Arab film selected in either the International Competition.

=== The International Federation of Film Critics ===
- The FIPRESCI Award is decided by a jury composed of a president and two members, and is awarded to a film in the international competition. The Award is announced during the CIFF closing ceremony.

== Cairo Film Connection ==
The Cairo Film Connection is the latest co-production platform aiming at maximizing networking to induce coproductions for films originating from the Arab world. The first year, around 10 projects will be selected by a team of experts. Directors and producers will be invited to the Cairo Film Connection to pitch their projects over a period of 3 days to key industry professionals whether international or from the region. Circulation of the selected project in Arabic and English as well as, individualized meetings scheduled in advance should maximize exposure of the projects and optimize all the participants' experiences. Guests will be carefully selected to cover all stages of development of film production, funding, distribution, marketing, broadcasting, sales, festivals. In addition to the exposure offered to filmmakers during the Cairo Film Connection, the Egyptian Ministry of Culture is offering a special award amounting to $10,000.

== Other festival sections ==
- Festival of Festivals – Screening the most important, reviewed and awarded feature and documentary films that participated in other renowned prominent international film festivals as Cannes, Berlinale, Venice and others.
- International Panorama – Screening different variety of international movies from all over the World.
- New Egyptian Cinema – Screening new Egyptian Movies produced and premiered in 2016/17.
- Feature Film Classics – Screening tens of international film Classics.
- Film Tributes – Giving tribute and honoring international and local film icons.
- Masterclass – highly acclimated guests present a cinematic masterclass, such as Gasper Noe in 2024, Bela Tarr in 2022, Terry Gillam in 2019 and others.
- Guest of Honor Film Week, from World Cinema – Screening films of a guest country, chosen annually in honoring World Cinema.

== Notable awards and honorees ==
=== Major award winners ===
Year	Best film	Best Director	Best Actor	Best Actress
1991; 15th	The Object of Beauty	Michael Lindsay-Hogg for The Object of Beauty	Joaquim de Almeida for Family Portrait	Christiane Heinrich for Suspicion
1992; 16th	Those Left Behind	Michael Apted for Thunderheart	Ole Lemmeke for The Naked Trees	Xiu Jingshuang for Those Left Behind
1993; 17th	Curfew	Nabil Maleh for The Extras	Andrzej Seweryn for Amok	Marina Neyolova for You Are My Only One
1994; 18th	Colonel Chabert	Yves Angelo for Colonel Chabert	Nour El-Sherif for A Hot Night	Laila Elwi for More Love, Less Violence
1995; 19th	The Flor Contemplacion Story	Sergei Masloboischikov for Josephine, the Singer and the Mice People	Stephen Rea for Citizen X	Nora Aunor for The Flor Contemplacion Story
1996; 20th	A Girl Called Apple	Pantelis Voulgaris for Akropol	Abu Bakr Ezzat for The Woman and the Hatchet	Julia Jäger for Outside Time
1997; 21st	The Chambermaid on the Titanic	Bigas Luna for The Chambermaid on the Titanic	Davor Janjić for Outsider	Reem Al-Turki for Ceremonial Wedding Dress
1998; 22nd	Malli	Santosh Sivan for Malli	Paschalis Tsarouhas for Vasiliki	Mei Ting for A Time to Remember
1999; 23rd	A Major Inconvenience	Martin Šulík for Prague Stories (Segment: "Pictures from the Visit")	Mahmoud Abdel Aziz for Pleasure Market	Pegah Ahangarani for The Girl in the Sneakers
2000; 24th	Sigh	Roch Stéphanik for Stand-by	Zhang Guoli for Sigh	Xu Fan for Sigh; Dominique Blanc for Stand-by
2001; 25th	Pauline and Paulette	Sinișa Dragin for Everyday God Kisses Us on the Mouth	Paul Freeman for Morlang	Niki Karimi for The Hidden Half
2002; 26th	The Last Blues	Mrinal Sen for My Land	Ahmed Zaki for His Excellency the Minister	Nandita Das for My Land; Katayoun Riahi for The Last Supper
2003; 27th	The King	Liang Shan for The Father	Song Guofeng for The Father	Sandrine Kiberlain & Sylvie Testud for Sole Sisters
2004; 28th	Guardians of the Clouds	Héctor Olivera for Ay Juancito	Adrián Navarro for Ay Juancito; Sofocles Peppas for Dust	Eszter Bagaméri for Guarded Secrets; Nelly Karim for My Soul Mate
2005; 29th	Mother of Mine	Klaus Härö for Mother of Mine	Bujar Lako for Magic Eye	Maria Lundqvist for Mother of Mine
2006; 30th	The Road	Khosro Masumi for Somewhere Too Far	Nicolás Mateo for Speed Begets Oblivion	Zhang Jingchu for The Road
2007; 31st	Intimate Enemies	Florent Emilio Siri for Intimate Enemies	Albert Dupontel for Intimate Enemies	Marina Magro for Opera; Tatyana Lyutaeva for Full Scope
2008; 32nd	Return to Hansala	Pernille Fischer Christensen for Dancers	Juan Diego Botto for El Greco	Yolande Moreau for Séraphine
2009; 33rd	Letters to Father Jacob	Mona Achache for The Hedgehog	Fathy Abdel Wahab for The Nile Birds; Subrat Dutta for Madholal Keep Walking	Karolina Piechota for Splinters
2010; 34th	Lust	Svetoslav Ovtcharov for Voice Over	Amr Waked & Alessandro Gassman for The Father and the Foreigner	Isabelle Huppert for Copacabana; Sawsan Badr for Lust
2012; 35th	Rendez-vous in Kiruna		Marian Dziędziel for The Fifth season of the Year	Vanessa Di Quattro for Breach in the Silence
2014; 36th	Melbourne		Khaled Abol Naga for Eyes of a Thief	Adèle Haenel for Love at First Fight
2015; 37th	Mediterranea	Dagur Kari for Virgin Mountain	Koudous Seihon for Mediterranea	Louise Bourgoin for I Am a Soldier
2016; 38th	Mimosas	Licínio Azevedo for The Train of Salt and Sugar	Shakib Ben Omar for Mimosas	Nahed El Sebai for A Day for Women
2017; 39th	The Intruder	Laura Mora for Killing Jesus	Raouf Ben Amor for Tunis By Night	Diamand Bou Abboud for Insyriated
2018; 40th	A Twelve-Year Night	Phuttiphong Aroonpheng for Manta Ray; Sergei Loznitsa for Donbass	Sherif Desoky for Night/Ext	Zsófia Szamosi for One Day
2019; 41st	I Am No Longer Here	Bas Devos for Ghost Tropic	Juan Daniel Garcia Trevino for I Am No Longer Here	Judy Ann Santos for Mindanao
2020; 42nd	Limbo	Ivan I. Tverdovsky for Conference	Yulian Vergov for German Lessons	Elham Shahin for Curfew; Natalya Pavlenkova for Conference
2021; 43rd	The Hole in the Fence	Laura Samani for Small Body	Mohamed Mamdouh for Abu Saddam	Swamy Rotolo for A Chiara
2022; 44th	Alam	Emmanuelle Nicot for Love According to Dalva	Maher Elkheir for The Dam; Mahmoud Bakri for Alam	Zelda Samson for Love According to Dalva
2024; 45th	The New Year That Never Came	Natalia Nazarova for Postmarks	Lee Kang-sheng for Blue Sun Palace; Maxim Stoyanov for Postmarks	Yara de Novaes for Malu

=== Major honorees ===
==== Actors ====
Marcello Mastroianni, Catherine Deneuve, John Malkovich, Elizabeth Taylor, Morgan Freeman, Sivaji Ganesan, Samuel L. Jackson, Sophia Loren, Claudia Cardinale, Leslie Caron, Richard Gere, Susan Sarandon, Gina Lollobrigida, Peter O'Toole, Omar Sharif, Ornella Muti, Victoria Abril, Shashi Kapoor, Alain Delon, Nicolas Cage, Goldie Hawn, Kurt Russell, Greta Scacchi, Julia Ormond, Mira Sorvino, Khalid Abdalla, Alicia Silverstone, Priscilla Presley, Stuart Townsend, Yolande Moreau, Christopher Lee, Irene Papas, Nora Aunor, Bud Spencer, Tom Berenger, Salma Hayek, Lucy Liu, Juliette Binoche, Dominique Blanc, Charlize Theron, Hilary Swank and Adrien Brody.

==== Directors ====
Robert Wise, Elia Kazan, Vanessa Redgrave, Oliver Stone, Roland Joffe, Carlos Saura, Ismail Merchant, Moustapha Akkad, Gadalla Gubara and Michelangelo Antonioni.

=== Miscellaneous awards ===
The CIFF 2004 Best Arab Film Award was given to an Egyptian film, Inas El-Degheidy's Searching for Freedom. In 2005 the CIFF honored its two star guests, American actor Morgan Freeman and French actress Leslie Caron. There was a screening of American actor and director Clint Eastwood's Million Dollar Baby starring Freeman, Eastwood and Hilary Swank; and American director Vincent Minnelli's classic musical An American in Paris (1951), starring Caron and Gene Kelly. CIFF's other 2005 honorees included Mohamed Mounir and Hanan Turk for their roles in Lebanese director Jocelyne Saab's Dunia (2005 film), a controversial film focusing on censorship and the oppression of women in Egypt. The Syrian-American producer and director Moustapha Akkad, who died in a 2005 terrorist attack in Amman, Jordan, was also honored that year. He is best remembered for Mohammad, Messenger of God (1976) (U.S. The Message) about the early days of Islam, and for the spine-chilling Halloween movie series.

== See also ==
- Egyptian Catholic Center for Cinema Festival
- Cairo International Women's Film Festival
- Berlin International Film Festival
- Cannes Film Festival
- List of film festivals
