= Lust (2010 film) =

2011 film

- Film poster
- Directed by: Khaled El Hagar
- Written by: Sayed Ragab
- Starring: Ruby; Ahmed Azmi; Sawsan Badr
- Cinematography: Néstor Calvo
- Production company: Arabica Movies
- Distributed by: Arabica Movies
- Release dates: 7 December 2010 (34th Cairo International Film Festival); 5 January 2011 (Egypt)
- Running time: 130 minutes
- Country: Egypt
- Language: Arabic

Lust (Arabic: الشوق, translit. El Shoq) is a 2010 Egyptian drama film directed by Khaled El Hagar. It stars Ruby, Ahmed Azmi and Sawsan Badr. Lust was reviewed at the 34th Cairo International Film Festival. In the Arab world of film production, it is the oldest annual cinema event. According to Daily News, “Lust” is an interesting and provocative contribution to this year’s festival." The Executive Producer Producer of Lust was Amr El Safie while Dima Al-Joundi, and Mohamed Yassine produced it.

The film was selected as the Egyptian entry for the Best Foreign Language Film at the 84th Academy Awards, but it did not make the final shortlist. Lust was produced and distributed by Arabica Movies and was released on January 5, 2011.

== Plot ==
Lust was shown in Egyptian cinema as a trend for viewing modern films. A report from the Egyptian Independent described it as "movies that realistically follow the lives of a group of characters living in one of the poorer areas around the main cities, whether it is Cairo or Alexandria. The plots are mostly harsh and gloomy, full of life-altering crises. Characters often, in order to survive the merciless circumstances around them, change their sweet nature and adapt to a new evil or sinful route in life."

== Cast ==
- Ruby as Shoq
- Ahmed Azmi as Hussin
- Sawsan Badr as Fatuma
- Koki as Awatif
- Mohamed Ramadan as Salem
- Doaa Taeima as Ragaa
- Butros Ghali as Saleh
- Salwa Mohamed Ali as Salem's mother
- Sayed Ragab (also the scriptwriter)
- Arefa Abdel Rassool

== Awards ==
Lust won the Golden Pyramid Award at the 34th Cairo International Film Festival. One of the actresses in "Lust" - Sawsan Badr was honored with a Thesping awards with another actress named Isabelle Huppert for Marc Fitoussi’s “Copacabana.”

== See also ==
- List of submissions to the 84th Academy Awards for Best Foreign Language Film
- List of Egyptian submissions for the Academy Award for Best Foreign Language Film
