= Safy Nebbou =

French actor and director

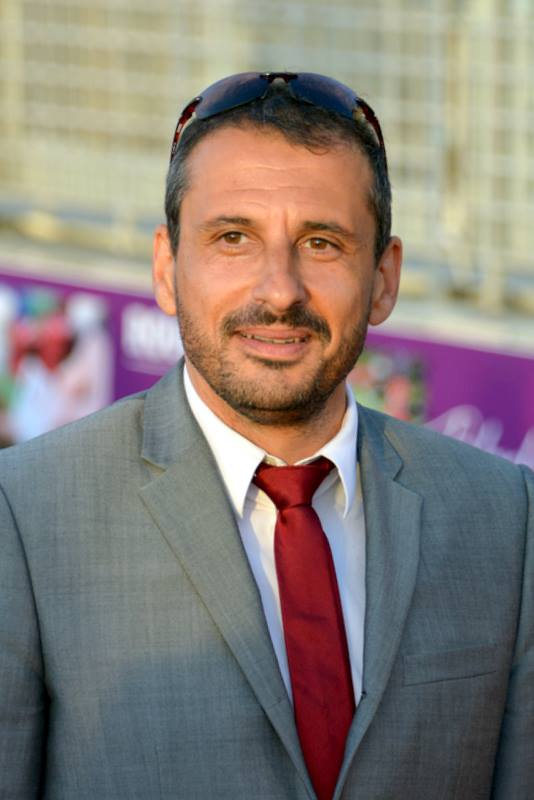
- Safy Nebbou at the 2015 Cabourg Film Festival
- Born: 27 April 1968 (age 58); Bayonne, Pyrénées-Atlantiques, France
- Occupations: Actor, director
- Years active: 1997–present
- Relatives: Mehdi Nebbou (brother), Allan Nebbou (brother), Sammy Nebbou (brother), Karim Nebbou (brother)

Safy Nebbou (born 27 April 1968) is a French actor and director.

== Life and career ==
Nebbou was born on 27 April 1968 in Bayonne, Pyrénées-Atlantiques, France to a German mother and an Algerian father. He is the brother of actor Mehdi Nebbou.

He started his career as a stage director at the Théâtre des Chimères in Bayonne, where Tsilla Chelton was one of his mentors, and worked as an actor. Subsequently, he directed short films, commercials for France Télécom, Orange and Renault, and feature films.

== Filmography ==
Year	Title	Credited as			Notes
Year	Title	Director	Screenwriter	Actor	Notes
1997	Pédagogie	Yes	Yes		Short film
1999	Le Sourire du clown			Yes	
2001	Bertzea	Yes	Yes		Short film
2003	Lepokoa	Yes	Yes		Short film
2004	The Giraffe's Neck	Yes	Yes	Yes	Cairo Film Festival - Naguib Mahfouz Award for Best Debut
2006	Une naissance	Yes			Short film
2007	Childhoods	Yes			Segment "L'Enfance d'Ingmar Bergman"
2008	Mark of an Angel	Yes	Yes	Yes	Cairo Film Festival - Best Screenplay; Cairo Film Festival - Best Second Work
2010	Dumas	Yes	Yes	Yes	
2012	Comme un homme	Yes	Yes		
2016	In the Forests of Siberia	Yes	Yes		
2019	Who You Think I Am	Yes	Yes		
