= 12 Angry Lebanese: The Documentary =

2009 Lebanese documentary film

- Film poster
- Directed by: Zeina Daccache
- Written by: Zeina Daccache
- Produced by: Zeina Daccache
- Release date: December 2009 (Dubai)
- Running time: 78 minutes
- Country: Lebanon

12 Angry Lebanese: The Documentary is a 2009 Lebanese documentary film directed, written and produced by Zeina Daccache, which chronicles efforts to stage an adaptation of Reginald Rose's 1954 teleplay Twelve Angry Men with inmates inside Beirut's Roumieh Prison It premiered at the 2009 Dubai International Film Festival.

== Production ==
The film was directed, written and produced by Zeina Daccache.

== Awards ==
The documentary won the following awards—

- Muhr Arab Documentary — First Prize
- People's Choice Award at Dubai International Film Festival (2009)
- First prize — audience award at the DOX BOX International Documentary Festival (2010)
