= Little Moth =

- Directed by: Peng Tao
- Written by: Peng Tao
- Based on: Little Moth by Bai Tianguang
- Starring: Zhao Huihui; Hong Qifa; Han Dequn
- Cinematography: Huang Yi
- Distributed by: dGenerate Films
- Release date: 1 October 2007 (Vancouver International Film Festival)
- Running time: 100 minutes
- Country: China
- Language: Mandarin

Little Moth (Chinese: 血蝉; pinyin: xuè chán), directed by Peng Tao, is a 2007 narrative independent Chinese film. The story revolves around a young girl who is forced to beg for money on the streets by a poor couple who has purchased her from a trafficker for this purpose.

== Festivals ==
- Hong Kong International Film Festival
- Locarno International Film Festival
- Bucharest International Film Festival
- Cairo International Film Festival
- Brisbane International Film Festival
