= Mark of an Angel =

- Film poster
- L'Empreinte de l'ange
- Directed by: Safy Nebbou
- Written by: Safy Nebbou; Cyril Gomez-Mathieu
- Produced by: Michel Saint-Jean
- Starring: Catherine Frot; Sandrine Bonnaire
- Cinematography: Éric Guichard
- Edited by: Bernard Sasia
- Music by: Hugues Tabar-Nouval
- Production companies: Diaphana Films; France 2 Cinéma
- Distributed by: Diaphana Films
- Release dates: 13 June 2008 (Cabourg); 13 August 2008 (France)
- Running time: 95 minutes
- Country: France
- Language: French
- Budget: €5.5 million
- Box office: $3.5 million

Mark of an Angel (original title: L'Empreinte de l'ange) is a 2008 French thriller film directed by Safy Nebbou. It is retitled Angel of Mine for its 2009 English-language DVD release.

== Plot ==
In a hospital Elsa Valentin gives birth to a daughter, but the baby reportedly dies in a fire. Seven years later she is divorcing her husband, and they fight over who gets custody over their 12-year-old son Thomas.

When Elsa collects her son from a party, she sees the 7-year-old girl Lola, who she thinks is her daughter, Lucie. First Elsa keeps this to herself, but she uses every opportunity to see Lola and keep into contact with her. Elsa begins by approaching Claire, the mother, by feigning interest in buying Claire's house, which is for sale, so that she can inspect the house and thus see Lola. She later encounters Claire and Lola when they go ice skating, where Elsa and Lola skate together and wind up falling. At Lola's ballet recital, Elsa stands on the side of the stage behind the curtains to watch her perform; Lola does not mind, as she feels as though Elsa supports her more than Claire does. Claire confronts Elsa with her stalking behavior.

Elsa reveals to Claire that she believes Lola is her daughter, though Claire refutes it. When Claire refuses Elsa's request for a DNA test, Elsa sneaks into the house to obtain a strand of Lola's hair. She is caught by Claire and loses the hair. When Claire tells her husband, Bernard, about the incident, he suggests that they go through with the DNA test as it will prove to Elsa that Lola is not her daughter. Claire is forced to reveal the truth to Elsa and Bernard: seven years ago, her own daughter died in a fire from smoke inhalation. At the hospital, she heard another baby crying and saw Elsa lying on the floor. Believing that Elsa was dead, she took the baby and pretended it was Lola while her own dead child was left in place as Elsa's baby.

Claire and Bernard agree that Lola should be returned to Elsa. Reunited, Elsa and Lola go for a walk together; though surprised with the decision, the girl does not appear to mind.

== Cast ==
- Catherine Frot: Elsa Valentin
- Sandrine Bonnaire: Claire Vigneaux
- Wladimir Yordanoff: Bernard Vigneaux
- Antoine Chappey: Antoine
- Michel Aumont: Alain Valentin
- Michèle Moretti: Colette
- Sophie Quinton: Laurence
- Geneviève Rey-Penchenat: Mme Corlet
- Héloïse Cunin: Lola
- Arthur Vaughan-Whitehead: Thomas
- Zacharie Chasseriaud: Jérémy
- Pascal Elso: The man in the bar
- Mehdi Nebbou: The Policeman

== Critical response ==
Review aggregation website Rotten Tomatoes reported an approval rating of 86%, based on 21 reviews, with an average rating of 6.2/10.

== Accolades ==
Award / Film Festival	Category	Recipients and nominees	Result
Cairo International Film Festival	Best Screenplay	Safy Nebbou and Cyril Gomez-Mathieu	Won
Cairo International Film Festival	Best Second Work	Safy Nebbou	Won
Globes de Cristal Award	Best Actress	Catherine Frot	Nominated
Lumière Awards	Best Actress	Catherine Frot	Nominated

== See also ==
- Angel of Mine (2019)
