= Richard Gere =

American actor (born 1949)

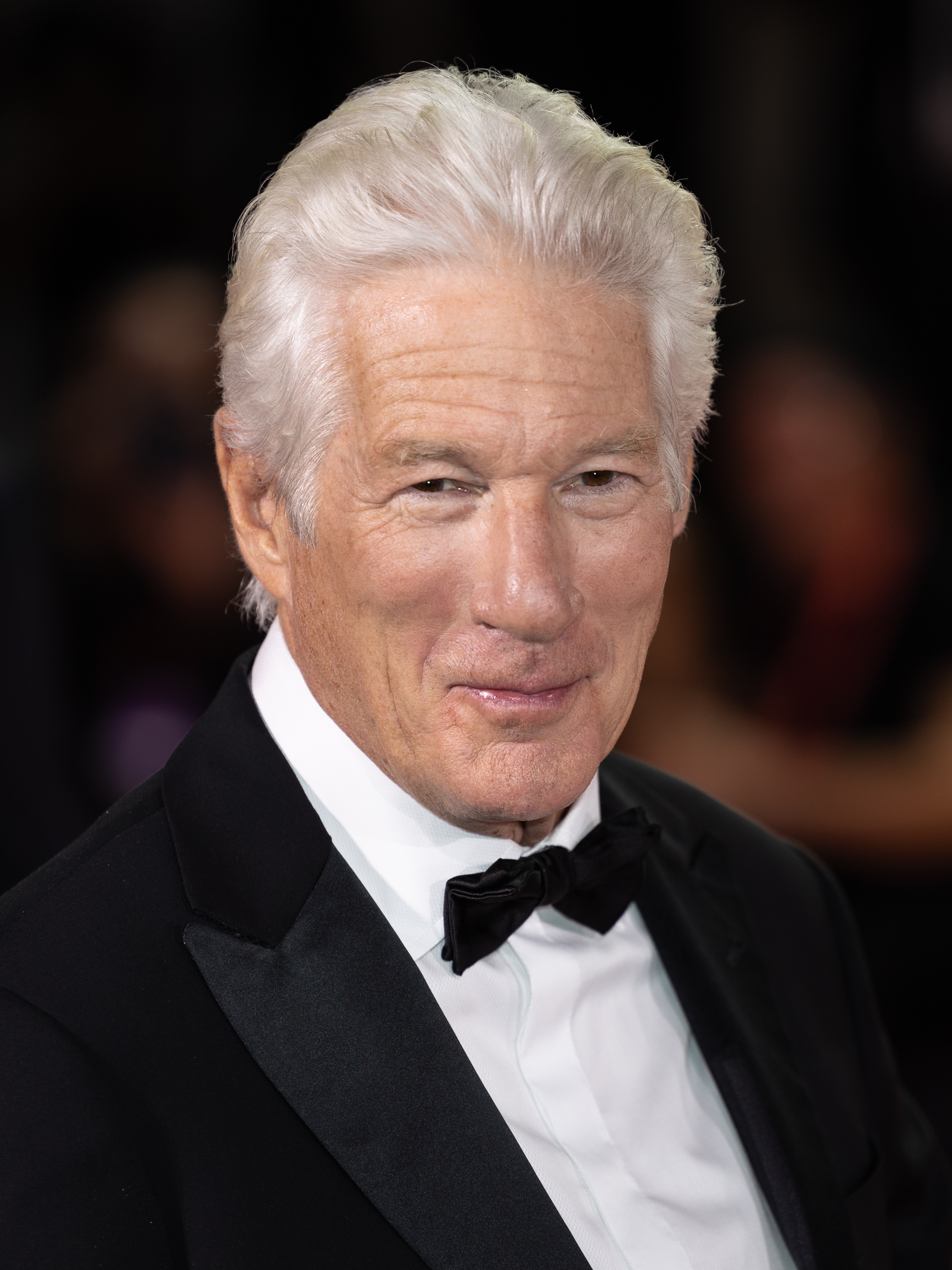
- Gere at the 2024 Venice Film Festival
- Born: Richard Tiffany Gere; August 31, 1949 (age 77); Philadelphia, Pennsylvania, U.S.
- Occupation: Actor
- Years active: 1969–present
- Spouses: Cindy Crawford (m. 1991; div. 1995); Carey Lowell (m. 2002; div. 2016); Alejandra Silva (m. 2018)
- Children: 4, including Homer

Richard Tiffany Gere (/ɡɪər/ GHEER; born August 31, 1949) is an American actor. He began appearing in films in the 1970s, playing a supporting role in Looking for Mr. Goodbar (1977) and a starring role in Days of Heaven (1978). Gere came to prominence with his role in the film American Gigolo (1980), which established him as a leading man and a sex symbol. Gere's other films include An Officer and a Gentleman (1982), The Cotton Club (1984), Internal Affairs (1990), Pretty Woman (1990), Sommersby (1993), First Knight (1995), Primal Fear (1996), The Jackal (1997), Red Corner (1997), Runaway Bride (1999), Unfaithful (2002), Shall We Dance? (2004), I'm Not There (2007), Hachi: A Dog's Tale (2009), Arbitrage (2012) and Norman (2016). For portraying Billy Flynn in the musical Chicago (2002), he won a Golden Globe Award.

== Early life and education ==
Richard Tiffany Gere was born on August 31, 1949, in Philadelphia, the eldest son and second child of homemaker Doris Ann (née Tiffany; 1924–2016) and NMIC insurance agent Homer George Gere (1922–2023). His father originally intended to become a minister. Gere was raised Methodist in Syracuse, New York. His paternal great-grandfather, George Lane Gere (1848–1932), changed the spelling of his surname from "Geer". One of his ancestors, also named George, was an Englishman who came from Heavitree, England, and settled in the Connecticut Colony in 1638. Both of Gere's parents were Mayflower descendants; his ancestors include Pilgrims such as John Billington, William Brewster, Francis Eaton, Francis Cooke, Degory Priest, George Soule and Richard Warren.

Gere graduated from North Syracuse Central High School in 1967, where he had excelled at gymnastics and music and played the trumpet. He then attended the University of Massachusetts Amherst on a gymnastics scholarship, studying philosophy. He left after two years and never graduated.

== Career ==
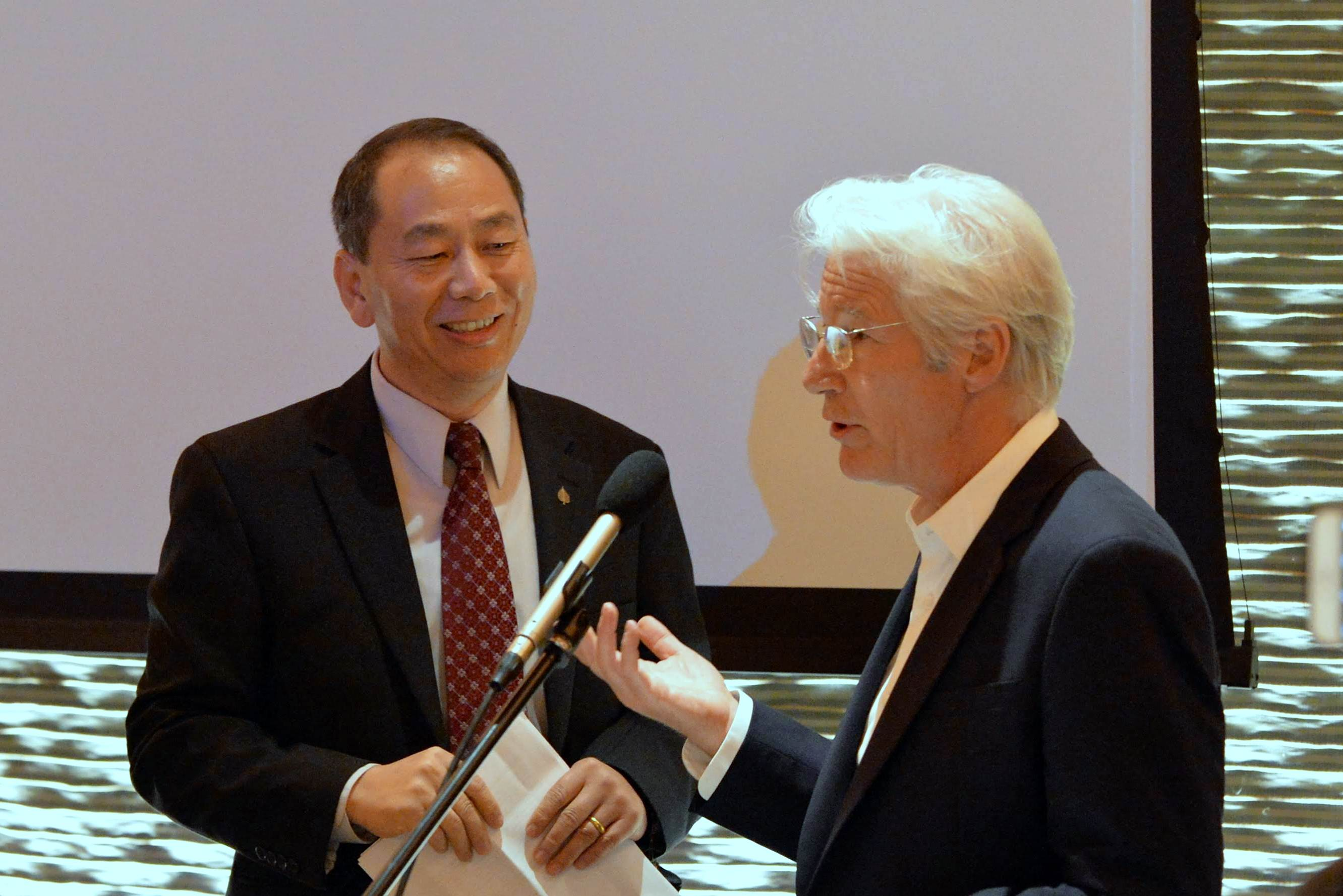
Gere (right) with Lobsang Nyandak during the Tibet Fund annual gala in 2016

Gere first worked professionally at the Seattle Repertory Theatre and the Provincetown Playhouse on Cape Cod in 1969, where he starred in Rosencrantz and Guildenstern Are Dead. His first major acting role was in the 1971 rock opera Soon, written by Scott Fagan and Joe Kookoolis, which opened on Broadway at the Ritz Theatre and closed after three performances. Following that, he appeared in the original London stage version of Grease, in 1973. Gere was one of the first notable Hollywood actors to play a homosexual character, starring as a gay Holocaust victim in the 1979 Broadway production of Bent, for which he earned a Theatre World Award.

Gere began appearing in Hollywood films in the mid-1970s. Originally cast in a starring role in The Lords of Flatbush (1974), he was replaced after fighting with his co-star Sylvester Stallone. Gere played a small but significant part in Looking for Mr. Goodbar (1977) and starred in director Terrence Malick's well-reviewed drama Days of Heaven (1978). The crime drama American Gigolo (1980) significantly boosted his profile and the romantic drama An Officer and a Gentleman (1982) (co-starring Debra Winger) cemented Gere's ascent to stardom, grossing almost $130 million and winning two Academy Awards out of six nominations; Gere himself received his first Golden Globe Award nomination. For the remainder of the 1980s, Gere appeared in films of varying critical and commercial reception. His career rebounded with the releases of Internal Affairs (1990) and Pretty Woman (1990), the latter of which earned Gere his second Golden Globe Award nomination. The 1990s saw Gere star in successful films including Sommersby (1993) (opposite Jodie Foster), Primal Fear (1996) and Runaway Bride (1999) (which reunited him with his Pretty Woman co-star Julia Roberts). He also took a leading role in the action thriller The Jackal (1997), playing former IRA militant Declan Mulqueen; Gere affected an Irish accent for the role. In the same year, Gere had another lead role, playing innocent American businessman in the controversial legal thriller film Red Corner.

Gere was named People magazine's "Sexiest Man Alive" in 1999. Not long thereafter, all in the same year, he appeared in the hit films The Mothman Prophecies (2002), Unfaithful (2002), and the Academy Award-winning musical film adaptation Chicago (2002), for which Gere won his first Golden Globe Award. His ballroom dancing drama Shall We Dance? (2004) was also a solid performer that grossed $170 million worldwide. His next film, the book-to-screen adaptation Bee Season (2005), was a commercial failure. Gere went on to co-star with Jesse Eisenberg and Terrence Howard in The Hunting Party (2007), a thriller in which he played a journalist in Bosnia. He next appeared with Christian Bale, Heath Ledger and Cate Blanchett in Todd Haynes' semi-biographical film about Bob Dylan, I'm Not There (2007); Gere was one of six actors to portray a variation of Dylan. He co-starred with Diane Lane in the romantic drama Nights in Rodanthe (2008). The film was widely panned by critics (making #74 on The Times Worst Films of 2008 list), but grossed over $84 million worldwide. The film is his most recent to have been produced entirely by a major film studio.

Gere has said his politics regarding China, an important financial resource for major Hollywood studios, have made him unwelcome within Hollywood. Gere embraced his apparent exile from Hollywood and instead appeared in independent films that garnered some of the best reviews of his career. Gere was notably singled out for portraying businessman Robert Miller in Arbitrage (2012), earning his fourth Golden Globe Award nomination. Among many positive reviews, Peter Travers of Rolling Stone cited Gere's performance as "too good to ignore" and "an implosive tour de force". Also in 2012, he received the Golden Starfish Award for Lifetime Achievement from the Hamptons International Film Festival and the Career Achievement Award from the Hollywood Film Awards. Gere had earlier received an award from the 34th Cairo International Film Festival in December 2010.

Gere made a notable departure from his traditional screen persona with Joseph Cedar's political drama Norman (2016). The film saw Gere portray Norman Oppenheimer, a small-time Jewish fixer. Gere himself described the character as an embodiment of the "sides of us we know are annoying and needy". His portrayal of Oppenheimer was called "consistently, completely fascinating" by RogerEbert.com and was singled out as a worthy Academy Award contender by Variety.

Gere composed and performed the Pretty Woman piano theme and a guitar solo in Runaway Bride. He studied tap for three months to shoot half a day of dancing for his role as lawyer Billy Flynn in Chicago. He also studied karate for An Officer and a Gentleman.

Multiple film critics and media outlets have said Gere is one of the best actors never to have received an Academy Award nomination.

== Political views and activism ==
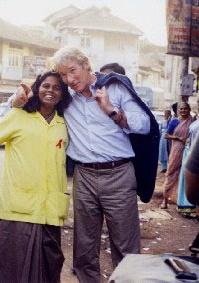
Gere visiting the USAID "Operation Lighthouse" Project in Mumbai

Gere regularly visits Dharamshala, the headquarters of the Tibetan government-in-exile. He is an advocate for human rights in Tibet and is a co-founder of the Tibet House US, creator of the Gere Foundation, and Chairman of the Board of Directors for the International Campaign for Tibet. Because he supports the Tibetan Independence Movement, Gere is permanently banned from entering China. In 2017, Gere stated he believed his advocacy had resulted in him no longer being cast in Hollywood blockbusters so as not to offend the growing Chinese audience for blockbuster films, with China now the second-largest film market in the world.

In 1993, Gere denounced the human rights abuses by the Chinese government while announcing the nominees for best art direction during the 65th Academy Awards. Afterwards he was permanently banned from being a presenter of the Academy Awards.

In September 2007, Gere called for the boycott of the 2008 Beijing Olympic Games to put pressure on China to make Tibet independent. He starred in a Free Tibet-themed Lancia commercial featuring the Lancia Delta. On June 27, 2011, Gere meditated in Borobudur Temple in Indonesia. He actively supports Survival International, an organization dedicated to protecting the rights and lands of tribal peoples throughout the world.

Gere campaigns for ecological causes and AIDS awareness. He currently serves on the board of directors for Healing the Divide, an organization that supports global initiatives to promote peace, justice and understanding. Gere helped to establish the AIDS Care Home, a residential facility in India for women and children with AIDS, and also supports campaigns for AIDS awareness and education in that country. In 1999, he created the Gere Foundation India Trust to support a variety of humanitarian programs in India.

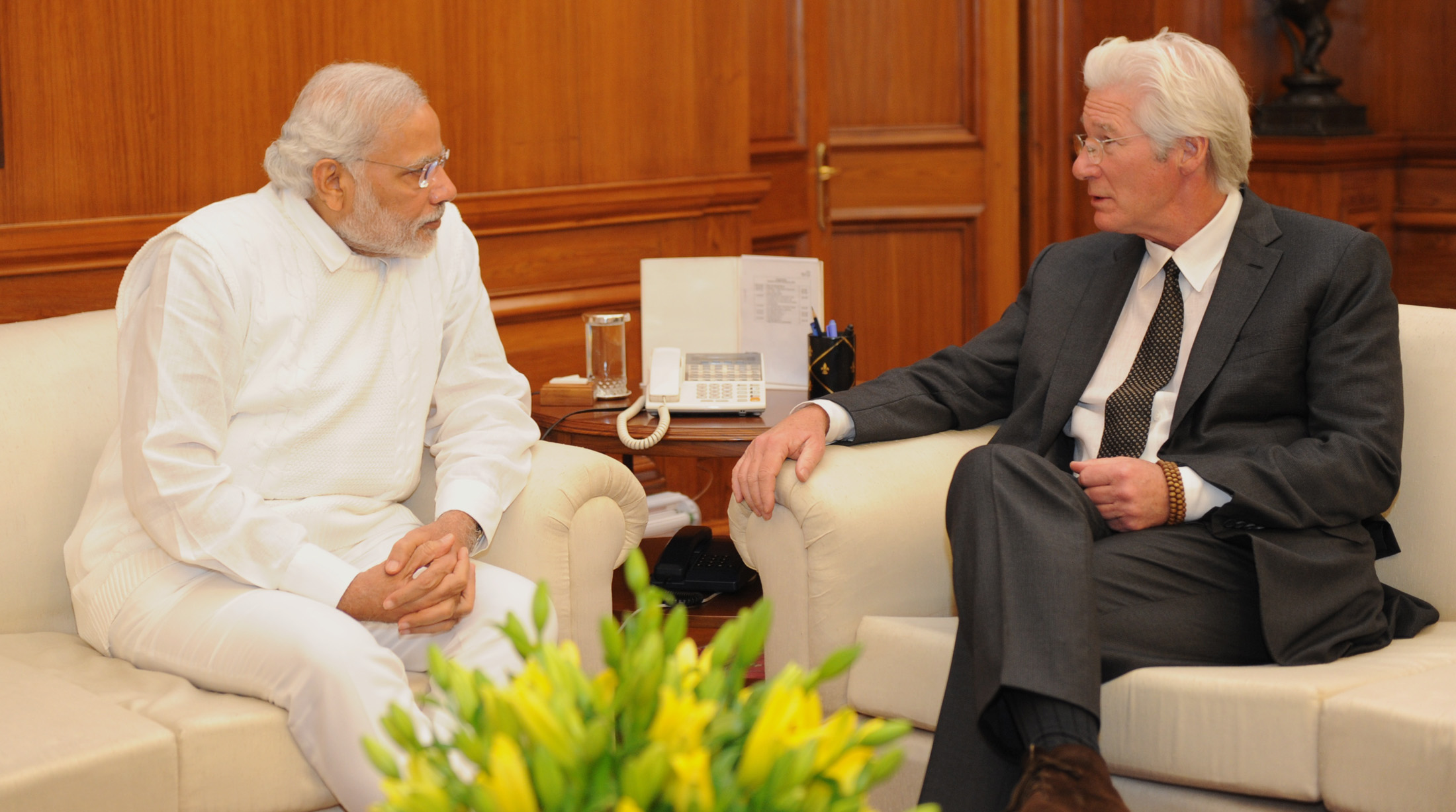
Gere with Narendra Modi in 2015

On April 15, 2007, Gere appeared at an AIDS awareness rally in Jaipur. During a live news conference to promote condom use among truck drivers, he embraced Bollywood superstar Shilpa Shetty, dipped her, and kissed her several times on the cheek. As a result of that gesture, a local court ordered the arrest of Gere and Shetty, finding them in violation of public obscenity laws. Gere has said the controversy was "manufactured by a small hard-line political party". About a month later, a two-judge bench headed by the Chief Justice of India, K. G. Balakrishnan, described the case as "frivolous" and believed that such complaints against celebrities were filed for "cheap publicity" and have brought a bad name to the country. They ruled that Gere would remain free to enter the country.

Gere contributed some of his writing for the book We Are One: A Celebration of Tribal Peoples, released in October 2009. Gere discussed the persecution and loss of land of the Jumma people as an example of a tragic story that repeats itself in different continents of the world, calling attention to the crime against their peaceful culture and how it reflects on humanity's relationship with nature and capacity to survive. The royalties from the book's sale go to the indigenous rights organization Survival International.

In 2010, Gere stated that the war in Iraq was not supported by the American people and that the presidency of George W. Bush had "bullied" Americans into the decision. He called George W. Bush a "very poor president". In a press conference held on the sidelines of the 34th Cairo International Film Festival, Gere said, "I'm very sorry about what the U.S. has done in Iraq. This war has been a tragedy for everyone. I hope that the people of Iraq can rebuild their country."

In 2016, Gere endorsed Hillary Clinton for president and donated $2,700 to her campaign. He backed Kamala Harris in the 2024 United States presidential election.

In 2017, Gere criticized Benjamin Netanyahu's policies on the Palestinians and Israel's expansion of settlements in the occupied West Bank, stating, "Settlements are such an absurd provocation and, certainly in the international sense, completely illegal—and they are certainly not part of the program of someone who wants a genuine peace process."

Gere has supported Ukraine in the Russo-Ukrainian war, calling it a "war against evil" and "probably the biggest war I have ever seen in my life". Following the Russian invasion in 2022, he sold his 1999 Jaguar XK8 and hosted a benefit concert at Carnegie Hall, donating the proceeds from both to Ukrainian charities.

In February 2023, Gere was one of the 480 global figures who signed a statement from Freedom House expressing support for Mahsa Amini protesters, urging sanctions on Iranian officials, and calling for the Islamic Revolutionary Guard Corps to be proscribed as a terror group.

In June 2023, Gere attended the hosting of the International Day of Yoga by Indian Prime Minister Narendra Modi in New York and praised Modi for his promotion of Indian culture in an event that saw 200 supporters and 50 protesters of the Indian government vocalizing their views from across the street.

== Personal life ==
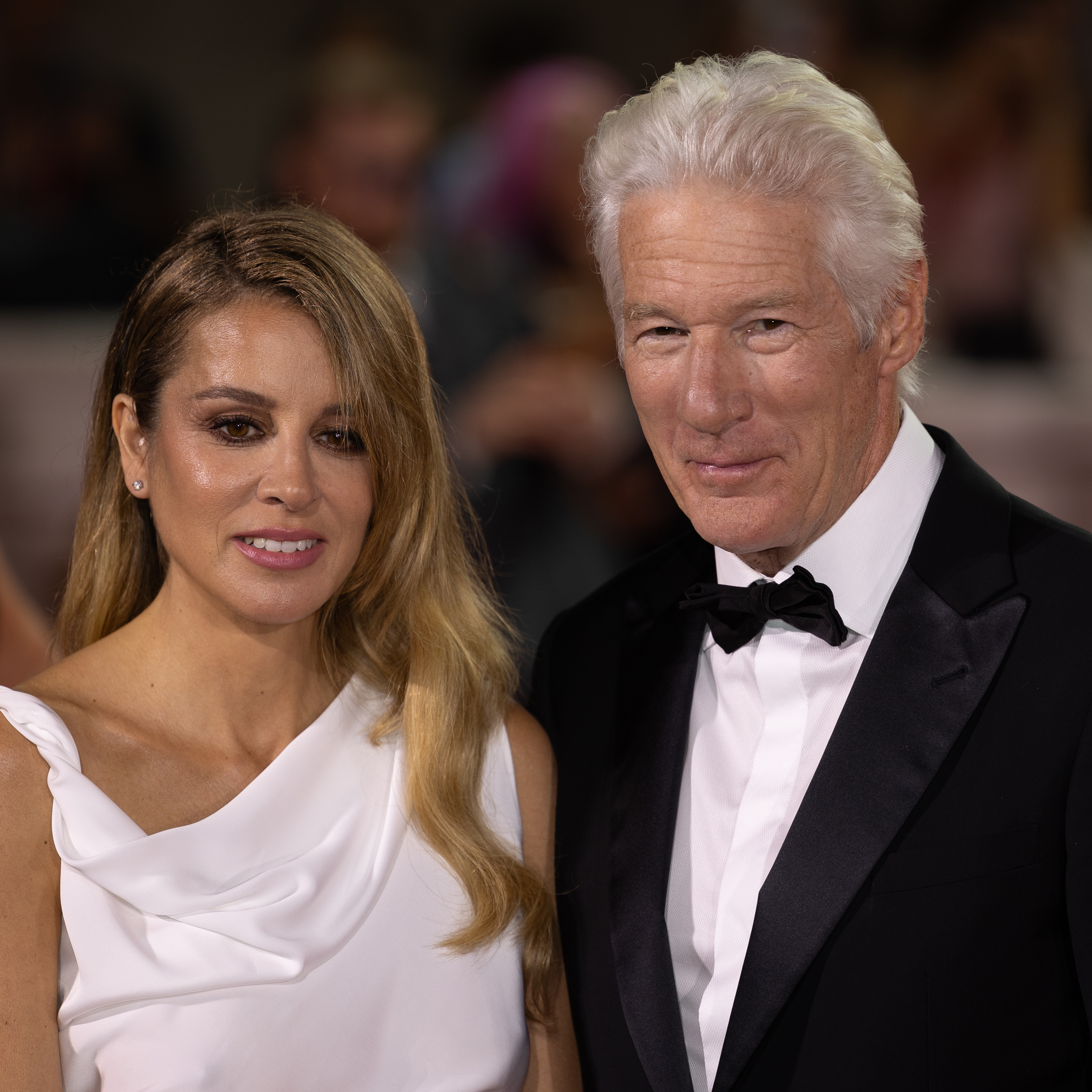
Gere with his third wife Alejandra Silva in 2024

Gere had on-again/off-again relationships with actress Penelope Milford from 1971 to 1978 and painter Sylvia Martins from 1978 to 1986. During those years, he was also sporadically linked to Tuesday Weld, Carole Mallory, Dawn Steel, Loree Rodkin, Barbara Carrera, and Barbra Streisand. It was suggested that Gere had affairs with Priscilla Presley and Kim Basinger in tell-all books by Presley's ex-boyfriend Michael Edwards and Basinger's ex-husband Ron Snyder. Gere has also reportedly dated models Laura Bailey, Tina Chow, Dalila Di Lazzaro, and Padma Lakshmi. He was married to model Cindy Crawford from 1991 to 1995.

In 2002, Gere married model and actress Carey Lowell. They have a son, actor Homer James Jigme Gere, who was born in February 2000 and is named for his grandfathers as well as the Tibetan name "Jigme". In 2013, Gere and Lowell separated. They spent three years in highly contested divorce proceedings in New York County Supreme Court. The case was settled in October 2016. In April 2018, Gere married Spanish activist Alejandra Silva. In August 2018, they announced that they were expecting their first child; their son was born in February 2019. In April 2020, the birth of their second son was reported.. Gere has three biological children, but has also helped to raise his stepson Albert Friedland, born to Silva in 2012 during her prior marriage.

Gere's interest in Buddhism began when he was in his 20s. He first studied Zen Buddhism under Kyozan Joshu Sasaki. After studying Zen for five or six years, he and Brazilian painter Sylvia Martins traveled in 1978 to Nepal, where Gere met many Tibetan monks and lamas. He met the 14th Dalai Lama in India and became a practicing Tibetan Buddhist (specifically of the Gelugpa school) and an active supporter of the Dalai Lama.

In February 2023, Gere was diagnosed and hospitalized with pneumonia during a family vacation in Nuevo Vallarta in Mexico. His wife said he had fully recovered from his illness.

Gere has often been included on lists of famous vegetarians, but his status as a vegetarian is disputed.

== Filmography ==
Key
†	Denotes titles that have not yet been released

=== Film ===
Year	Title	Role	Notes
1975	Report to the Commissioner	Billy	
1976	Baby Blue Marine	Raider	
1977	Looking for Mr. Goodbar	Tony Lopanto	
1978	Bloodbrothers	Thomas Stony De Coco	
1978	Days of Heaven	Bill	
1979	Yanks	Matt Dyson	
1980	American Gigolo	Julian Kaye	
1982	An Officer and a Gentleman	Zack Mayo	
1983	The Honorary Consul	Dr. Eduardo Plarr	a.k.a. Beyond the Limit
1983	Breathless	Jesse Lujack	
1984	The Cotton Club	Dixie Dwyer	
1985	King David	David	
1986	No Mercy	Eddie Jillette	
1986	Power	Pete St. John	
1988	Miles from Home	Frank Roberts, Jr.	
1990	Internal Affairs	Dennis Peck	
1990	Pretty Woman	Edward Lewis	
1991	Rhapsody in August	Clark	
1992	Final Analysis	Dr. Isaac Barr	Also executive producer
1993	Mr. Jones	Mr. Jones	Also executive producer
1993	Sommersby	John Robert 'Jack' Sommersby	Also executive producer
1994	Intersection	Vincent Eastman	
1995	First Knight	Lancelot	
1996	Primal Fear	Martin "Marty" Vail	
1997	The Jackal	Declan Joseph Mulqueen	
1997	Red Corner	Jack Moore	
1999	Runaway Bride	Homer Eisenhower "Ike" Graham	
2000	Dr. T & the Women	Dr. Sullivan Travis	
2000	Autumn in New York	Will Keane	
2002	The Mothman Prophecies	John Klein	
2002	Unfaithful	Edward Sumner	
2002	Chicago	William "Billy" Flynn	
2004	Shall We Dance?	John Clark	
2005	Bee Season	Saul Naumann	
2006	The Hoax	Clifford Irving	
2007	The Hunting Party	Simon	
2007	I'm Not There	Bob Dylan as Billy the Kid	
2007	The Flock	Agent Erroll Babbage	
2008	Nights in Rodanthe	Dr. Paul Flanner	
2009	Amelia	George Putnam	
2009	Hachi: A Dog's Tale	Parker Wilson	Also producer
2009	Brooklyn's Finest	Eddie Dugan	
2011	The Double	Paul Shepherdson	
2012	Arbitrage	Robert Miller	
2013	Movie 43	Boss	Segment: "iBabe"
2014	Henry & Me	Henry	Voice
2014	Time Out of Mind	George Hammond	Also producer
2015	The Second Best Exotic Marigold Hotel	Guy Chambers	
2015	The Benefactor	Franny	
2016	Norman	Norman Oppenheimer	
2017	The Dinner	Stan Lohman	
2017	Three Christs	Dr. Alan Stone	
2023	Maybe I Do	Howard	
2024	Oh, Canada	Leonard Fife	
2024	Longing	Daniel	
2026	The Basics of Philosophy		
2027	Left Seat †		Post-production
2027	Asymmetry †	Ezra	Filming

=== Television ===
Year	Title	Role	Notes
1975	Chelsea D.H.O.	Milo	Television film
1975	Strike Force	Officer Walter C. Spenser	Television film
1976	Kojak	Geno Papas	Episode: "Birthday Party"
1993	And the Band Played On	The Choreographer	Television film
2001	The Simpsons	Himself (voice)	Episode: "She of Little Faith"
2014	Cosmos: A Spacetime Odyssey	Clair Cameron Patterson (voice)	Episode: "The Clean Room"
2019	MotherFatherSon	Max Finch	8 episodes
2020	Martha Knows Best	Himself	Episode: "Perennial Garden"
2024–present	The Agency	James 'Bosko' Bradley	Main role
TBA	The Off Weeks	Jonathan	Upcoming miniseries

== Awards and honors ==
In 1995, Gere was the president of the jury at the 19th Moscow International Film Festival.

On May 17, 2012, Albanian President Bamir Topi awarded the Medal of Gratitude to Gere with the citation: "With gratitude and honor outstanding personality of the world art, great humanist and activist for the protection of human rights, which unmasked and the American public made known, and further, inhuman crimes, ethnic cleansing in Kosovo, in 1999, the Serbian military machine against the Albanian civilian population living in its land." On February 16, 2012, the George Eastman Museum honored Gere with the George Eastman Award for distinguished contribution to the art of film.

Year	Nominated work	Award	Result
1979	Days of Heaven	David di Donatello Award for Best Foreign Actor	Won
1983	An Officer and a Gentleman	Golden Globe Award for Best Actor in a Motion Picture – Drama	Nominated
1984	The Honorary Consul	Nastro d'Argento Award for Best Foreign Actor	Nominated
1986	King David	Golden Raspberry Award for Worst Actor	Nominated
1991	Pretty Woman	Golden Globe Award for Best Actor in a Motion Picture – Musical or Comedy	Nominated
1994	And the Band Played On	Primetime Emmy Award for Outstanding Supporting Actor in a Miniseries or a Movie	Nominated
1997	Red Corner	National Board of Review Freedom of Expression Award	Won
2000	Runaway Bride	Blockbuster Entertainment Award for Favorite Actor – Comedy/Romance	Nominated
2001	Dr. T & the Women	Satellite Award for Best Actor in a Motion Picture – Musical or Comedy	Nominated
2001	Autumn in New York	Golden Raspberry Award for Worst Screen Combo (shared with Winona Ryder)	Nominated
2003	Chicago	Broadcast Film Critics Association Award for Best Cast	Won
2003	Chicago	Golden Globe Award for Best Actor in a Motion Picture – Musical or Comedy	Won
2003	Chicago	Screen Actors Guild Award for Outstanding Performance by a Cast in a Motion Picture	Won
2003	Chicago	Phoenix Film Critics Society Award for Best Cast	Nominated
2003	Chicago	Screen Actors Guild Award for Outstanding Performance by a Male Actor in a Leading Role	Nominated
2003	Chicago	Teen Choice Award for Choice Movie Villain	Nominated
2005	Shall We Dance?	Teen Choice Award for Choice Movie: Dance Scene (shared with Jennifer Lopez)	Nominated
2007	The Hoax	Satellite Award for Best Actor in a Motion Picture – Musical or Comedy	Nominated
2008	I'm Not There	Independent Spirit Robert Altman Award	Won
2013	Arbitrage	Golden Globe Award for Best Actor in a Motion Picture – Drama	Nominated
