= Lee Eun-soo =

South Korean military personnel

- Born: 1965 (age 60–61); Gumi, Gyeongsangbuk-do, South Korea
- Allegiance: South Korea
- Branch: Republic of Korea Army
- Rank: Brigadier general
- Website: barunlaw.com

Korean name
- Hangul: 이은수
- Hanja: 李恩守
- RR: I Eunsu
- MR: I Ŭnsu

Brigadier General Lee Eun-soo (born 1965) is a South Korean former army officer in the legal field. She was the first female general officer of the South Korean army's legal branch and the seventh in the whole army.

== Biography ==
Lee was born in 1965 and attended Ohsang High School in Gumi, North Gyeongsang, from which she graduated in 1984. She attended Kyungpook National University and graduated with a bachelor's degree in law in 1989. Lee became a commissioned officer of the Republic of Korea Army in 1991; she was the first female judicial officer in that army. In 1992 she attended the Judicial Research and Training Institute of the Supreme Court of Korea and served as a military prosecutor in the army's 11th Corps from 1993 to 1994.

Lee was judge advocate for the 36th Division from 1995 to 1996 and thereafter served as an instructor in law at the army's Consolidated Administrative School for two years. From 1998 she served with the Ministry of National Defense's Department of Legislative Affairs as a specialist in international law. In 2002 Lee was appointed head of the army's litigation department and in 2003 was appointed dean of the law department at the Consolidated Administrative School. She served as chief judge of South Korea's General Military Court in 2005 before being appointed chief of the army's Department of Legislative Affairs. In 2006 Lee became Chief of the Department of Litigation, Ministry of National Defense's Prosecutors' Office.

Lee was awarded a master's degree in law by Korea University and that year was appointed judge advocate for the Second Operations Command. She was appointed to be head of the army's Human Rights Department in 2010, and by 2011 she had become a colonel.

In April 2011 Lee was promoted to the rank of brigadier general. She became the first female general in the legal branch and the seventh female general in the army. Also in 2011 she was appointed Judge Advocate General for the South Korean Army, a position she held until 2012, when she became chief judge of the High Court of the Armed Forces. She studied in the Advanced Management Program in Security at Seoul National University in 2013 and in 2014 in a similar program at the Korea Advanced Institute of Science and Technology. Lee resigned from the army in 2014, and in 2015 she entered private practice as a partner at Barun Law.
