= Chus Gutiérrez =

Spanish director, writer, and actress (born 1962)

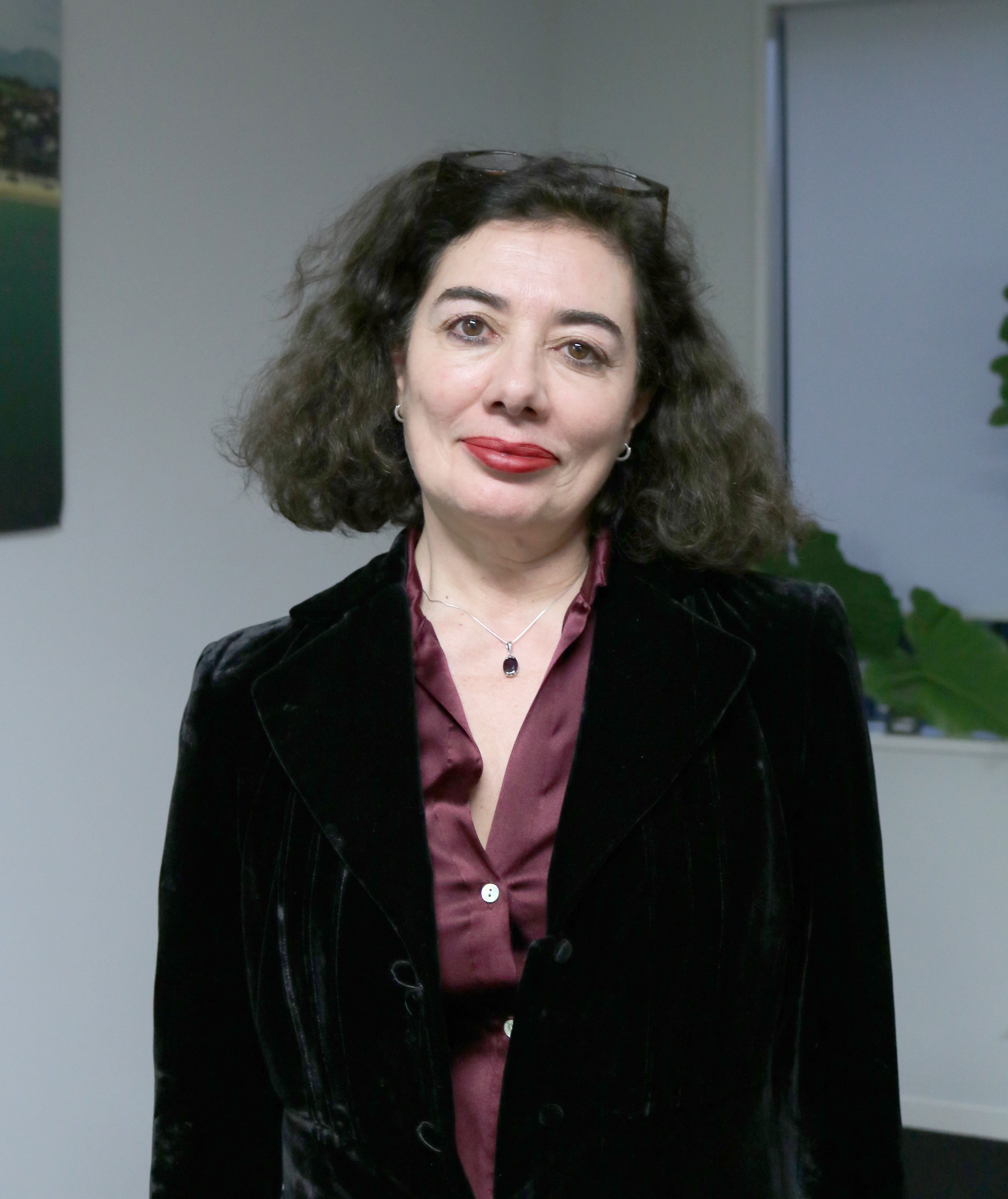
Gutiérrez in 2015

María Jesús "Chus" Gutiérrez (born 1962) is a Spanish director, writer, and actress. Gutiérrez has experiences of moving back and forth between Spain and the United States, which influenced her filmmaking, as her films are known for discussing topics such as immigration, globalization, and multiculturalism.

== Early life ==
María Jesús Gutiérrez was born in Granada in 1962. She moved to Madrid with her family in 1970. She moved to London to learn English when she was 17. At the age of 21 she moved to New York to study filmmaking at Global Village, under the instruction of Fred Barney Taylor. At the age of 23, she enrolled in The City College of New York, CUNY and was admitted to the Picker Film Institute in order to continue her filmmaking education.

== Career ==
Gutiérrez first worked with Super 8, at which she gained experiences in filmmaking in diverse areas. She formed a rap group “Xoxonees” in the late 80s. In 1987 she moved back to Spain for her group to record their album. In 1989 the group disbanded. Since the 1990s she has worked mainly as a director. However, she also acts in her own films.

== Direction ==
Gutiérrez is known for making films with a low budget. For example, she uses hand-held camera shots and natural lighting, and she does not play with different angles but normally uses straight-on angle positions. Other than the fact that its location was New York, she managed to keep costs down in her first film Sublet (1992) by shooting indoors. Sexo Oral (1994) is said to be the cheapest Spanish film ever made. She kept its costs down by interviewing non-professional actors, and not hiring many professional actors.

Her approach to problems about immigration, globalization, and multiculturalism can be frequently seen in her films. Poniente (2002) describes African immigration issues on Spanish identity. As a woman director, she includes a feminist approach in her film as well. In Return to Hansala (2008) she depicts a Moroccan woman as a strong and independent character, who has her own ideas towards immigrant issues and is not scared of speaking of them in public. In addition to that, she plays with the idea of cultural "otherness" by looking at the tensions among society, religious, ethnicity, and history. Representing immigrants issues also ties with politics in the film. The film reflects how North African Muslims are seen as immigrants, and how current politics made them move away from their home land.

== Filmography ==
Directed Films
| 1992 | Sublet |
| 1994 | Sexo Oral |
| 1996 | Alma Gitana |
| 1998 | Insomnio (Sleepless in Madrid) |
| 2002 | Poniente |
| 2004 | ¡Hay motivo! |
| 2004 | Every So often In The World... |
| 2004 | Las Siete Alcantarillas |
| 2005 | El Calentito |
| 2008 | Return to Hansala |
| 2009 | Sin Pensarlo Dos Veces |
| 2010 | Mi Primer Amanecer |
| 2010 | Me Gustaría Estar Enamorada... A Veces Me Siento Muy Sola |
| 2014 | Ciudad Delirio |
| 2014 | Sacromonte, Los Sabios De La Tribu |
| 2015 | Droga Oral |
| 2020 | Rol & Rol |
| 2022 | Sin ti no puedo |
| 2022 | Little Red Riding Wolf |

Directed TV series
| 1999 | Ellas Son Asi |
| 2013 | Nadia En Cuesta |
