= Return to Hansala =

- Theatrical release poster
- Original title: Retorno a Hansala
- Directed by: Chus Gutiérrez
- Screenplay by: Chus Gutiérrez; Juan Carlos Rubio
- Starring: José Luis García Pérez; Farah Hamed; Adam Bounnouacha; Antonio de la Torre; Antonio Dechent; Cuca Escribano
- Cinematography: Kiko de la Rica
- Edited by: Fernando Pardo
- Music by: Tao Gutiérrez
- Production companies: Muac Films; Maestranza Films
- Distributed by: Wanda Visión
- Release dates: 10 September 2008 (Toronto); 27 March 2009 (Spain)
- Running time: 95 minutes
- Country: Spain
- Languages: Spanish; Arabic; Berber (Central Atlas Tamazight); French

Return to Hansala (Spanish: Retorno a Hansala) is a 2008 Spanish film directed by Chus Gutiérrez which stars Farah Hamed and José Luis García Pérez. It won the Golden Pyramid Award at the 32nd Cairo International Film Festival and was also screened at the 2008 Dubai International Film Festival.

== Plot ==
At the beginning of this decade the bodies of eleven young Moroccan immigrants who were trying to cross the Strait of Gibraltar appeared on the beaches of Rota. From their clothes, it was discovered that they all came from the same village, Hansala. The film tries to portray that event through the eyes of Martín, a funeral parlor owner who tries to make money on their deaths, and Leila, the sister of one of the dead boys. Together, they adventure into trying to repatriate the boy's body by van and live an intense moral experience that will lead them to question their beliefs.

The film begins with several bodies washing up on the Spanish shore, Playa de Getares, near the coastal town of Algeciras. One of them is the younger brother of Leila, a refugee living in the town. She had encouraged him to risk the boat crossing to Spain, against their family's wishes. After identifying her brother, Leila decides to repatriate his body, and face the wrath of her parents. Teaming up with a Spanish undertaker Martin, the pair embark on the hazardous trip to Leila's mountain village of Hansala in the Moroccan countryside. Leila's most fundamental beliefs are challenged, as she must face her family, and their grief, anger and love. Martin meanwhile is surprised by his welcome in the village.

== Cast ==
- Farah Hamed as Leila
- José Luis García Pérez as Martín
- Adam Bounnouacha as Said
- Antonio de la Torre as Antonio
- Cuca Escribano as Carmen
- Antonio Dechent as Manolo
- César Vea as Cirilo
- Miguel Alcíbar as Pepe

== Production ==
The film was produced by Maestranza Films and Muac Films. Shooting locations included Algeciras and Los Barrios. It was shot in Spanish, Arabic, Berber (Central Atlas Tamazight), and French.

== Release ==
The film premiered at the Toronto International Film Festival in September 2008. Its festival run also included Tangier, the Seville European Film Festival, the Valladolid International Film Festival (Seminci), and the 32nd Cairo International Film Festival, among others. It was theatrically released in Spain by Wanda on 27 March 2009.

== Awards ==
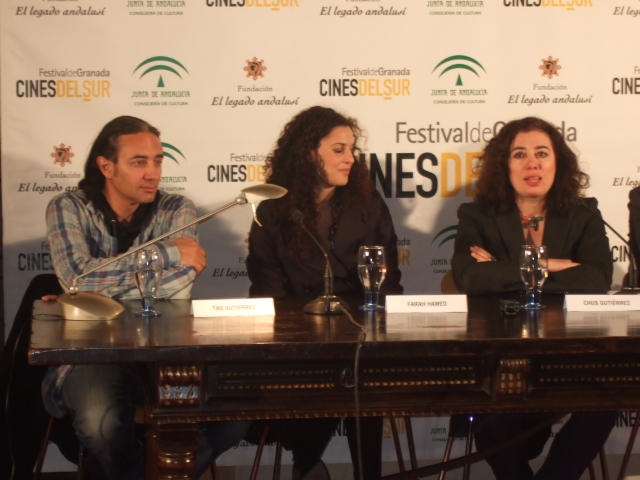
Tao Gutiérrez, Farah Hamed, and Chus Gutiérrez at a press conference for the film at Cines del Sur

Year	Award	Category	Nominee(s)	Result	Ref.
2008	53rd Valladolid International Film Festival	Jury Special Prize		Won	
2008	32nd Cairo International Film Festival	Golden Pyramid		Won	
2009	23rd Goya Awards	Best Original Screenplay	Chus Gutiérrez, Juan Carlos Rubio	Nominated	
2009	23rd Goya Awards	Best New Actress	Farah Hamed	Nominated	
2009	23rd Goya Awards	Best Original Song	Tao Gutiérrez	Nominated	

== See also ==
- List of Spanish films of 2009
