= Zeina Daccache =

Lebanese actress and director

Zeina Daccache زينة دكاش
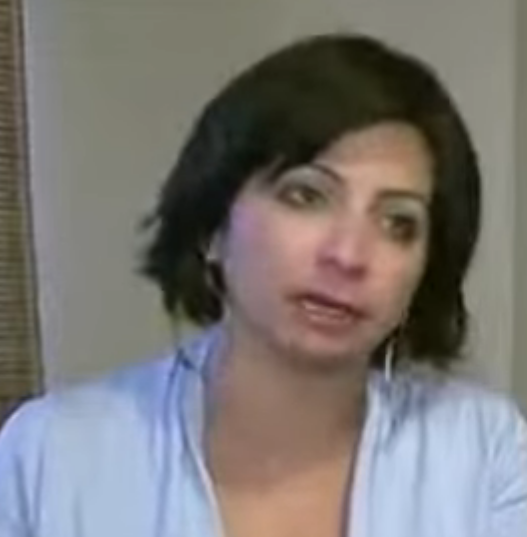
- Occupations: Actress, director, drama therapist
- Years active: 2008–present
- Spouse: Zaid Nshewat
- Children: 1

Zeina Daccache (Arabic: زينة دكاش) is a Lebanese actress, theatre and film director and drama therapist. She worked as a television actress from 2003 to 2015.

== Career ==
She is the founder and executive director of ‘Catharsis - Lebanese Center for Drama Therapy’ and works as a drama therapist in prisons and rehabilitation centres. Through her work, several laws in Lebanon have been amended. Daccache is the recipient of many awards as a result of her distinguished contributions to social initiatives and service.

She first rose to prominence after playing the role of Izo in Basmat Watan that aired on the Lebanese Broadcasting Corporation.

== Early life ==
Zeina Daccache studied at the Saint Joseph University of Beirut, where she obtained in July 2000 a Bachelor's degree in Scenic and Dramatic Arts. She then went on to study for one year at École Philippe Gaulier from October 2000 to June 2001. In 2007, she got her graduate degree from Kansas State University in the United States and she earned in 2009 her master's degree in Clinical Psychology at Haigazian University in Beirut. In 2011, she became a Registered Drama Therapist with the North American Drama Therapy Association. In 2017, she became a Board Certified Trainer with the North American Drama Therapy Association.

== Filmography ==
=== As a director ===
- 12 Angry Lebanese: The Documentary (2009)
- Scheherazade's Diary (2013)
- Shebaik Lebaik (2016)
- The Blue Inmates (2021)
- Li Chabakna Ykhallesna (2025)

=== As an actress ===
- Yanoosak - 2010
- Li Chabakna Ykhallesna (2025)- Role as self
