= Scheherazade's Diary =

- Film poster
- Arabic: يوميّات شهرزاد
- Directed by: Zeina Daccache
- Written by: Zeina Daccache
- Cinematography: Jocelyne Abi Gebrayel
- Edited by: Michele Tyan
- Music by: Khaled Mouzanar
- Release date: December 9, 2013
- Running time: 80 minutes
- Country: Lebanon
- Language: Arabic

Scheherazade's Diary is a 2013 film directed by Zeina Daccache.

== Synopsis ==
The women inmates of Lebanon's Baabda Prison relate their personal experiences and feelings about patriarchy as they prepare and present the first theatre performance staged inside an Arab women's prison. It was filmed during and after the ten-month 2012 drama therapy/theatre project in the prison. It features the women inmates.

In the film, the women reveal stories of domestic violence, traumatic childhood, failed marriage, unhappy romance and deprivation of motherhood. The film follows the women as they rehearse for the show and intermingles scenes from the live performance with testimonials and backstage antics.

== Awards and nominations ==
- The FIPRESCI prize (International Critics Prize) Documentary category at the 10th Annual Dubai International Film Festival (Dec 6–14, 2013) Dubai, United Arab Emirates.
- The special mention prize in the Muhr Arab Documentary category at the 10th Annual Dubai International Film Festival (Dec 6–14, 2013).
- The GOLD FIFOG award for the best documentary at FIFOG film festival Geneva April 2014
- The Human Rights Award at FIDADOC film festival Agadir, Morocco May 2014.
- 2014 URTI Grand Prix-Arman Trophy for Author's Documentary, June 2014, Monaco.
- Best Documentary Prize at the 11th edition of the Lebanese Film Festival, June 2014
- Al Araby TV Network Award, Malmo Arab Film Festival, September 2014
- The Special Mention at the 36th edition of Cinemed, International Mediterranean Film Festival of Montpellier, November 2014
- Best Arab Film Prize at the 36th edition of Cairo International film Festival on the 18th of Nov 2014
- Best Lebanese Motion Picture Soundtrack at the Lebanese Cinema Movie Guide Awards 2014
