= Sawsan Badr =

Egyptian actress (born 1959)

Sawsan Badr (Arabic: سوسن بدر, nicknamed: The Nefertiti of Egyptian Cinema; born 12 November 1957) is an Egyptian actress who has received the best film award at the 34th Cairo International Film Festival. She played the role of Mishaal bint Fahd Al Saud, the Saudi princess who was executed for adultery along with her lover, in the 1980 movie, Death of a Princess.
