= Centro Cultural Recoleta =

Coordinates: 34°35′11″S 58°23′32″W

Recoleta Cultural Center
- Centro Cultural Recoleta

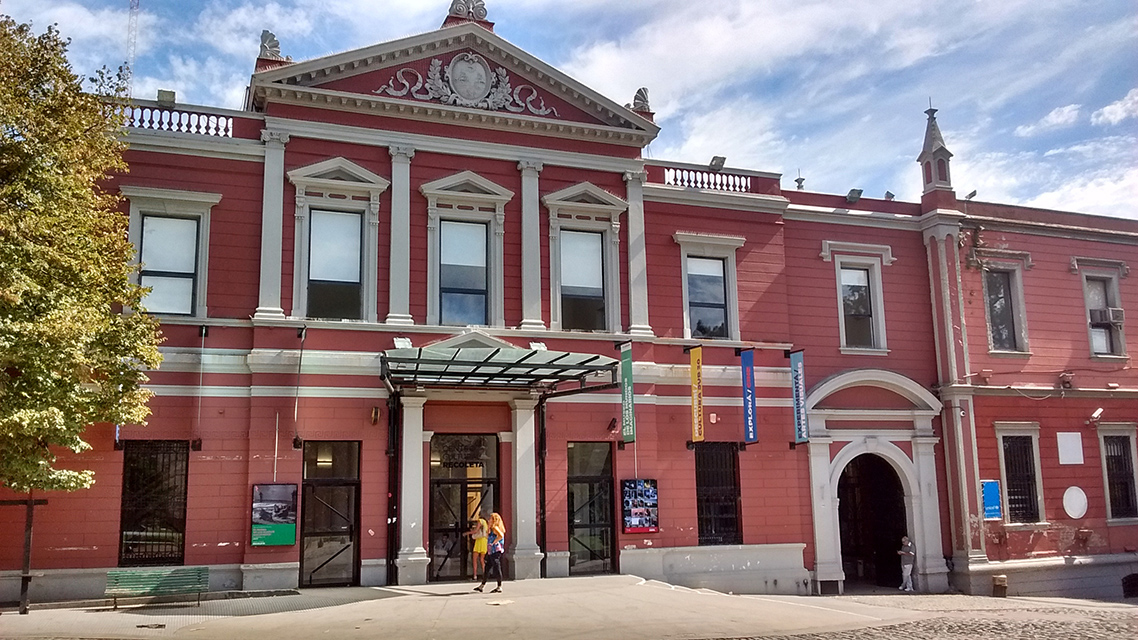
- Main facade of the CCR
- Interactive map of the Recoleta Cultural Center area

General information
- Location: Junín 1930, Buenos Aires, Argentina
- Year built: 1858
- Construction started: 1980; 46 years ago
- Owner: City of Buenos Aires

Design and construction
- Architect: Juan A. Buschiazzo

Website
- centroculturalrecoleta.org

The Centro Cultural Recoleta (English: Recoleta Cultural Centre) is an exhibition and cultural events centre located in the barrio of Recoleta, Buenos Aires, Argentina. It holds sculptures and exhibitions, as well as concerts and artistic presentations and workshops of diverse types. in September/October 2006 it held the wildly successful onedotzero festival attracting over 20,000 people in 3 days for installations, live performances, screenings and music.

== History ==
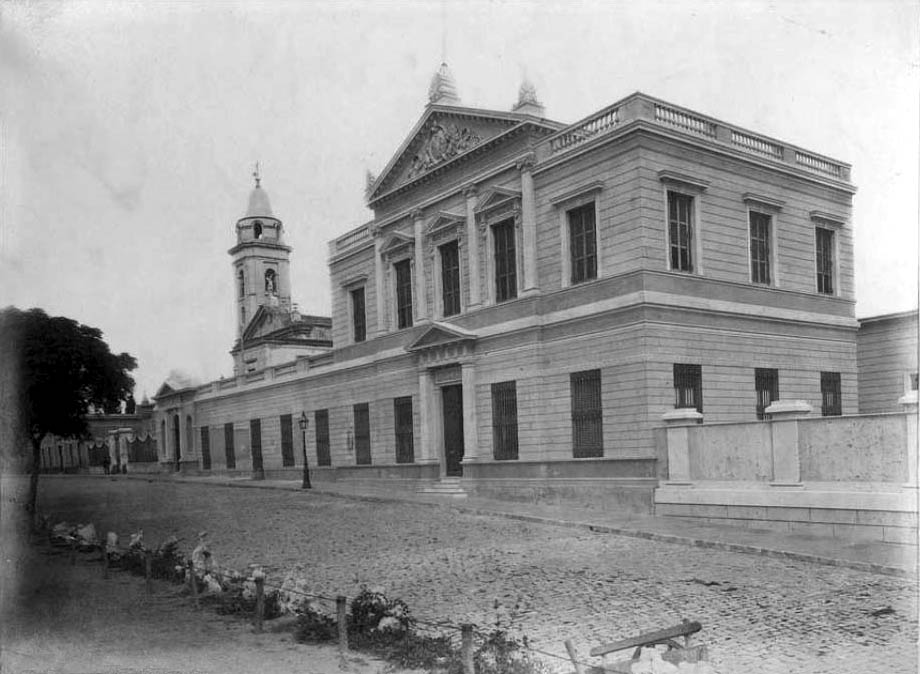
As a shelter for the homeless, circa 1880.

The building where the cultural centre is located was originally donated to the Franciscans in 1716. The blueprints of the construction were drawn by Jesuit architects Juan Krauss and Juan Wolf, while the design of the façade and interiors are attributed to Andrés Blanqui.

The building, finished in 1732, is one of the oldest in the city. With the arrival of the May Revolution and the declaration of independence during the first part of the 19th century, the building changed purposes. Manuel Belgrano founded a drawing school there, and since the 1870s it served as a shelter for the destitute. Torcuato de Alvear, first mayor of Buenos Aires, beautified Recoleta as well as the cultural centre; Juan Antonio Buschiazzo gave it an Italian style and created the chapel currently used as an auditorium.

The second important renovation took place around 1980 by Clorindo Testa, Jacques Bedel and Luis Benedit, when the building was planned as a cultural centre.

== Gallery ==
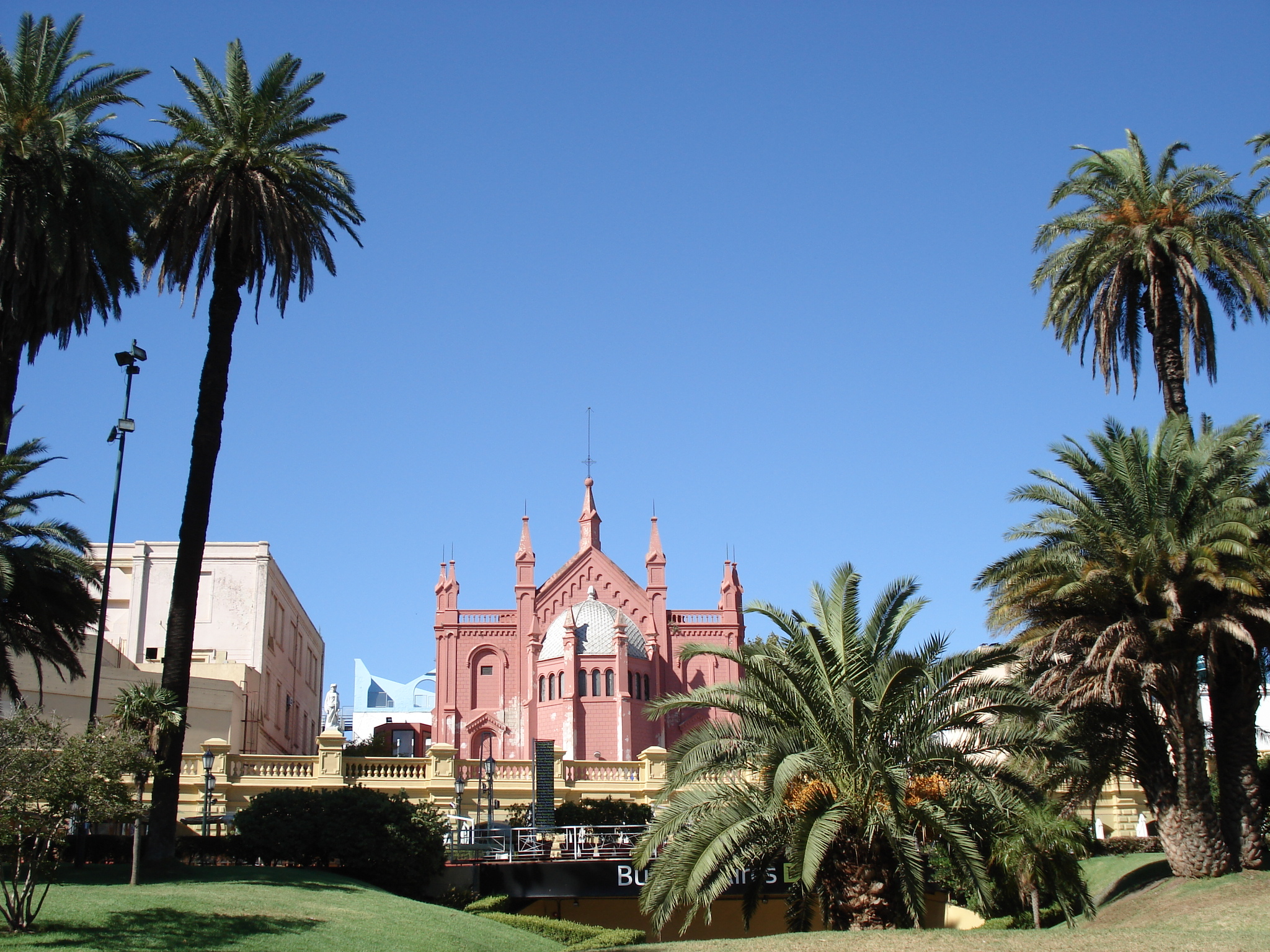

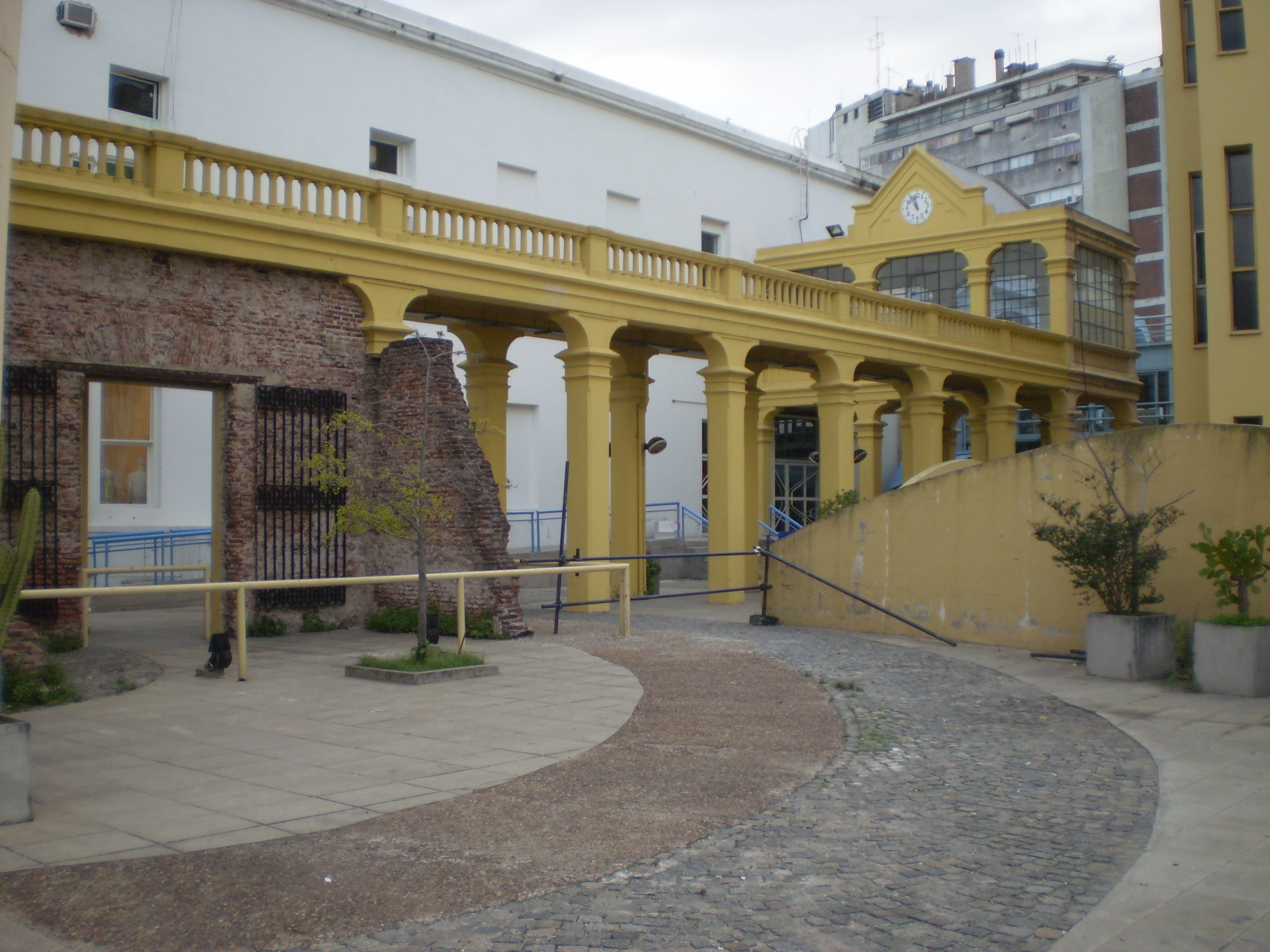

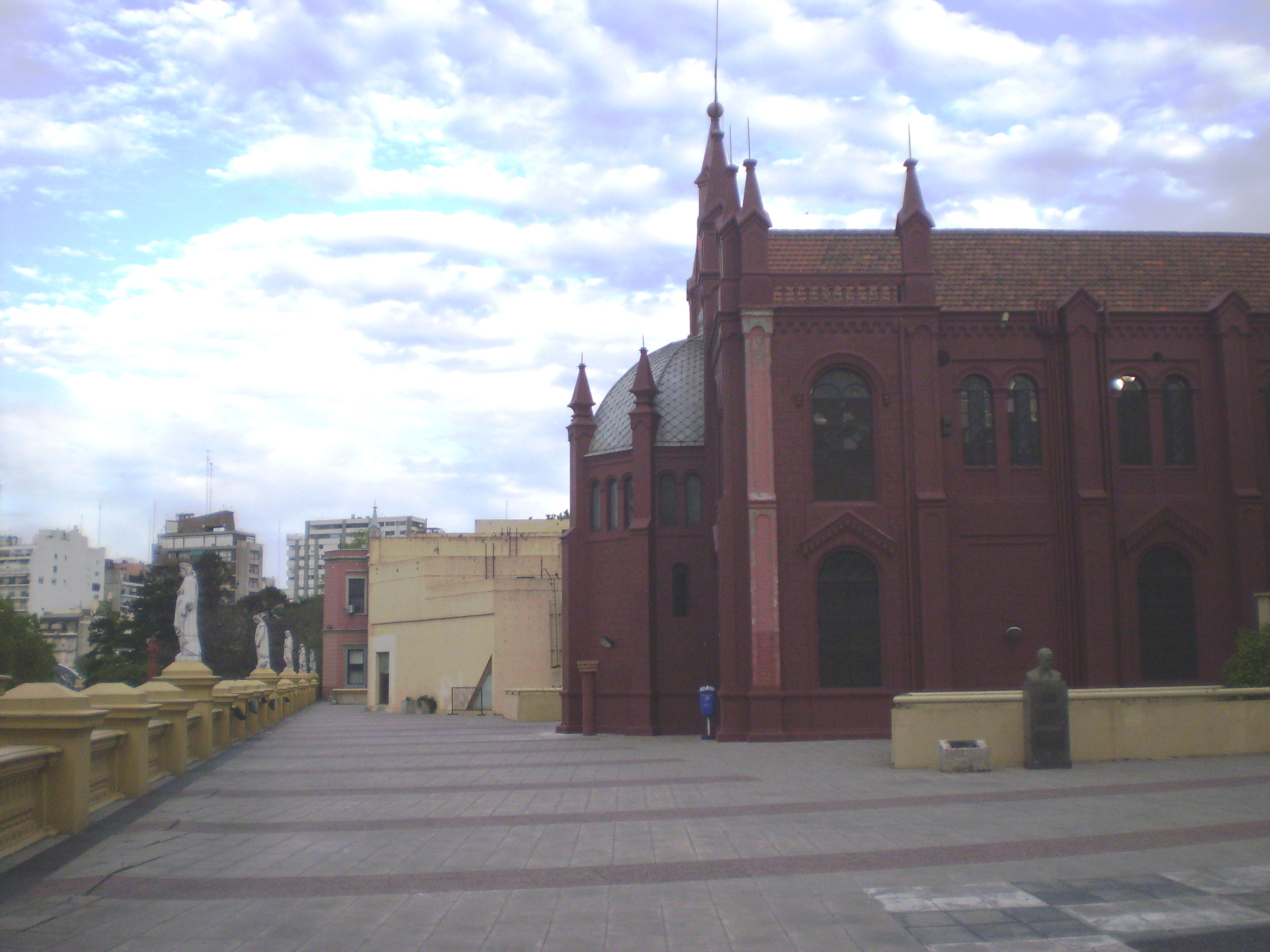

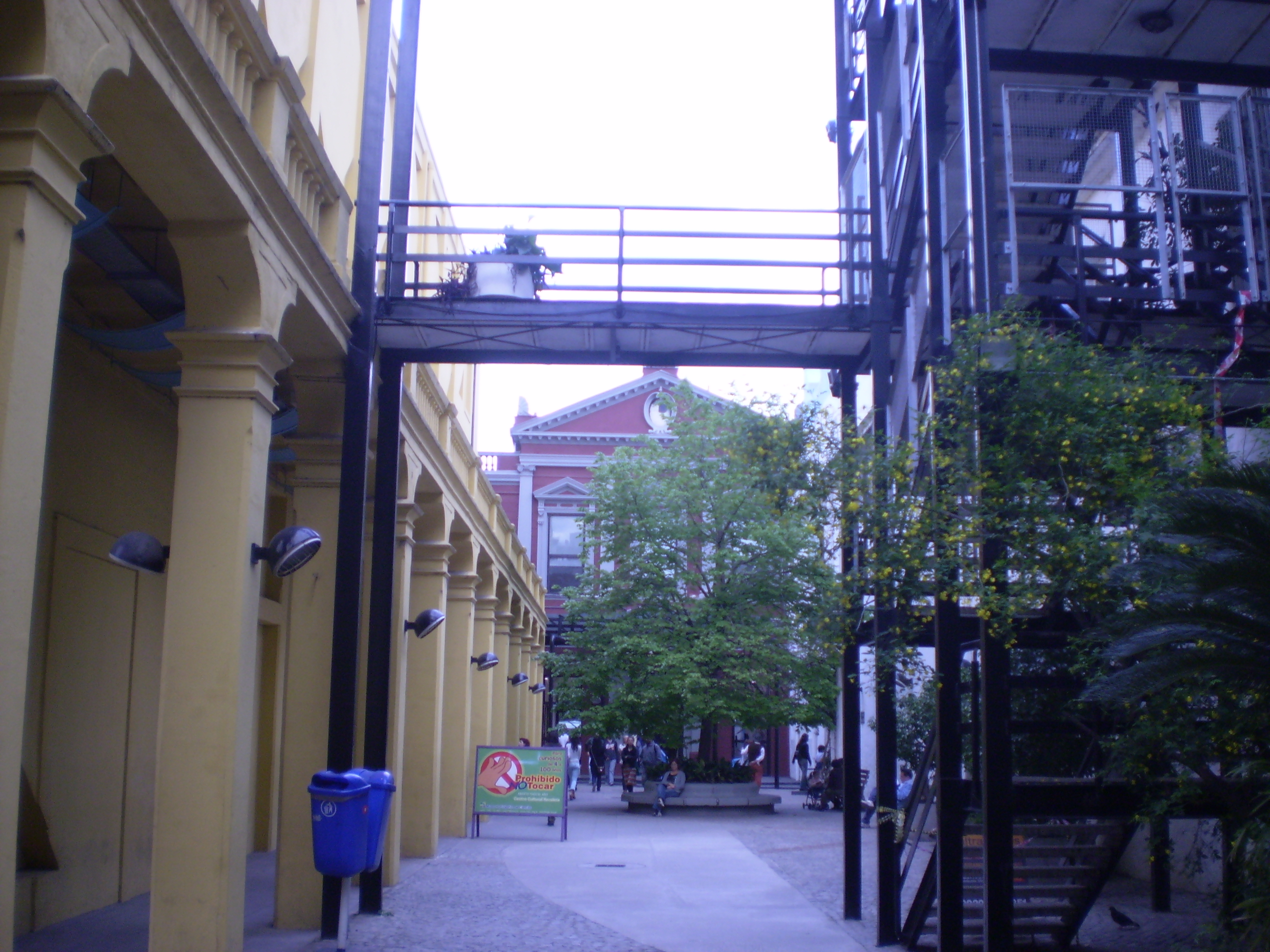
