= Daoud Aoulad-Syad =

Moroccan filmmaker and photographer

- Born: April 14, 1953 (age 72); Marrakesh
- Citizenship: Morocco
- Occupations: Film producer, Photographer, Film director, Screenwriter, Assistant director

Daoud Aoulad-Syad (Arabic: داوود اولاد السيد; born April 14, 1953, in Marrakech) is a Moroccan photographer, film director, and screenwriter. His photography, mostly revolving around Morocco and its inhabitants, has been featured in exhibitions worldwide.

== Biography ==
While studying for a doctorate in physics at the University of Nancy, he became passionate about photography. After several exhibitions, he started attending a film workshop at the École nationale supérieure des métiers de l'image et du son. He directed the short films Mémoire ocre, Entre l'absence et l'oubli and L'Oued before making his first feature film, Adieu forain in 1998.

== Filmography ==
=== Director ===
- 1991 : Mémoire ocre (short film)
- 1993 : Entre l'absence et l'oubli (short film)
- 1995 : L’Oued (short film)
- 1998 : Adieu forain
- 2001 : Le Cheval de vent (Aoud rih)
- 2004 : Tarfaya
- 2007 : Waiting for Pasolini (Fi intidar Pasolini)
- 2010 : La Mosquée (A Jamaâ)
- 2018 : Les voix du désert
