= Peng Tao =

Chinese Minister of Chemical Industry from 1959 to 1961

- 彭涛
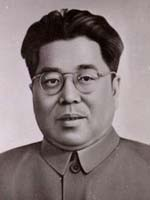
- Peng Tao

Minister of Chemical Industry
- In office May 1959 – July 1962
- Premier: Zhou Enlai
- Preceded by: New title
- Succeeded by: Liang Yingyong

Personal details
- Born: Peng Dingqian (彭定乾); 1913 Poyang County, Jiangxi, China
- Died: 1961 (aged 47–48) Beijing, China
- Party: Chinese Communist Party
- Education: Fu Jen Catholic University

Chinese name
- Chinese: 彭定乾
Transcriptions
Standard Mandarin
- Hanyu Pinyin: Péng Dìngqián

Peng Tao
- Simplified Chinese: 彭涛
- Traditional Chinese: 彭濤
Transcriptions
Standard Mandarin
- Hanyu Pinyin: Péng Tāo

Peng Tao (Chinese: 彭涛; 1913 – 14 November 1961) was a Chinese politician who served as Minister of Chemical Industry from 1959 to 1961.

== Early life and education ==
Peng was born Peng Dingqian (彭定乾) in Poyang County, Jiangxi, in 1913. He joined the Communist Youth League in 1926 and became leader of the Poyang County Children's League. He attended Nanchang Hongsheng Middle School and High School Affiliated to Beiping University. In June 1932, he became members of the League of Left-Wing Writers and the Chinese Communist Party (CCP).

In the summer of 1933, he was sent to work at the Ji Hongchang Department of the Chahar People's Counter-Japanese Army and served as secretary of the Zhangjiakou Municipal Committee of the Communist Youth League. After failing to resist Japanese aggression in September 1933, he returned to Beiping and was admitted to Fu Jen University in 1934. In June 1935, he was appointed head of the Publicity Department of the CCP Beiping Municipal Committee. In 1935, he led and organized the December 9th Movement. In 1936. he was chosen as head of the Publicity Department of the CCP Tianjin Municipal Committee.

During the Second Sino-Japanese War, he worked in the CCP Hebei-Henan-Shanxi Provincial Committee.

In October 1945, he was commissioned as political commissar of the Second Field Army. He was secretary of the CCP Western Anhui District Committee in November 1947, in addition to serving as political commissar of the Western Anhui Military District. In April 1949, he was appointed as director of the Office of the Nanjing Military Control Commission.

After the founding of the Communist State, in November 1949, he was appointed second secretary of the CCP Southern Sichuan District Committee, concurrently serving as political commissar of the Southern Sichuan Military District. He was made second secretary of the CCP Chongqing Municipal Committee.

He was transferred to Beijing in November 1954 and appointed deputy director of the National Planning Commission (now National Development and Reform Commission). In May 1956, he was promoted to minister of the newly founded Ministry of Chemical Industry. He concurrently served as deputy director of the National Planning Commission and director of its the Comprehensive Utilization Bureau (Resource Utilization Bureau). In May 1958, he was elected an alternate member of the 8th Central Committee of the Chinese Communist Party.

On 14 November 1961, he died of lung cancer in Beijing, at the age of 48.

Government offices
New title	Minister of Chemical Industry; 1959–1962	Succeeded by Liang Yingyong
