= 34th Cairo International Film Festival =

Egyptian film festival in 2010

- 34th CIFF Official Poster
- Location: Cairo, Egypt
- Founded: 1976
- Awards: Golden Pyramid
- Festival date: November 30 – December 9, 2010
- Website: http://www.cairofilmfest.org/

The 34th annual Cairo International Film Festival was held from November 30 to December 9, 2010.
