= List of thriller films of the 2000s =

List of thriller films released in the 2000s.

Title	Director	Cast	Country	Subgenre/notes
2000
2000 AD	Gordon Chan	Aaron Kwok, Phyllis Quek, Daniel Wu	Hong Kong	Action thriller
The 6th Day	Roger Spottiswoode	Arnold Schwarzenegger, Robert Duvall, Tony Goldwyn, Michael Rapaport, Michael Rooker, Sarah Wynter, Wendy Crewson	United states	Action thriller
Anatomy	Stefan Ruzowitzky	Franka Potente, Benno Fürmann, Anna Loos	Germany	
Baise-Moi	Virginie Despentes, Coralie Trinh Thi	Raffaela Anderson, Karen Bach	France	Crime thriller
The Beach	Danny Boyle	Leonardo DiCaprio, Tilda Swinton, Virginie Ledoyen	United States	Psychological thriller
Before the Storm	Reza Parsa	Per Graffman, Emil Odepark	Sweden	drama crime thriller
The Cell	Tarsem Singh	Jennifer Lopez, Vince Vaughn, Vincent D'Onofrio	United States	Psychological thriller
La comunidad	Álex de la Iglesia	Carmen Maura, Eduardo Antuna, Jesus Bonilla	Spain	
The Crimson Rivers	Mathieu Kassovitz	Jean Reno, Vincent Cassel, Nadia Farès	France	
Devil in the Flesh II: Teacher's Pet	Marcus Spiegel	Jodi Lyn O'Keefe	United States	
Chasing Sleep	Michael Walker	Jeff Daniels, Emily Bergl	United States	
Frequency	Gregory Hoblit	Dennis Quaid, James Caviezel, Andre Braugher	United States	
Gangster No. 1	Paul McGuigan	Malcolm McDowell, David Thewlis, Paul Bettany	United Kingdom; Germany	Crime thriller
Get Carter	Stephen Kay	Sylvester Stallone, Alan Cumming, Miranda Richardson, John C. McGinley, Rachael Leigh Cook, Mickey Rourke, Michael Caine	United States	
Hollow Man	Paul Verhoeven	Elisabeth Shue, Kevin Bacon, Josh Brolin	United States	Science Fiction-horror
Memento	Christopher Nolan	Guy Pearce, Carrie-Anne Moss, Joe Pantoliano	United States	
Merci Pour le Chocolat	Claude Chabrol	Isabelle Huppert, Jacques Dutronc	France; Switzerland	
Mission: Impossible 2	John Woo	Tom Cruise, Dougray Scott, Thandiwe Newton, Richard Roxburgh, Ving Rhames	United States	Action thriller
Proof of Life	Taylor Hackford	Meg Ryan, Russell Crowe, David Morse	United States	
Proximity	Scott Ziehl	James Coburn, Rob Lowe, Kelly Rowan	United States	
Reindeer Games	John Frankenheimer	Ben Affleck, Gary Sinise, Charlize Theron	United States	
Seance	Kiyoshi Kurosawa	Kōji Yakusho, Jun Fubuki, Ittoku Kishibe	Japan	
Sexy Beast	Jonathan Glazer	Ray Winstone, Ben Kingsley, Ian McShane	United Kingdom	Crime thriller
Time and Tide	Tsui Hark	Nicholas Tse, Wu Bai, Anthony Wong	Hong Kong	Action thriller
Six-Pack	Alain Berberian	Richard Anconina, Frédéric Diefenthal, Chiara Mastroianni	France	
Unbreakable	M. Night Shyamalan	Bruce Willis, Samuel L. Jackson, Robin Wright Penn	United States	
Versus	Ryuhei Kitamura	Tak Sakaguchi, Hideo Sakaki	Japan	Action thriller
Vertical Limit	Martin Campbell	Chris O'Donnell, Bill Paxton, Robin Tunney, Scott Glenn	United States	Action thriller
The Watcher	Joe Charbanic	James Spader, Marisa Tomei, Keanu Reeves	United States	
What Lies Beneath	Robert Zemeckis	Harrison Ford, Michelle Pfeiffer, Diana Scarwid	United States	
With a Friend Like Harry...	Dominik Moll	Laurent Lucas, Sergi López, Mathilde Seigner	France	
X-Men	Bryan Singer	Hugh Jackman, Patrick Stewart, Ian McKellen, Halle Berry, James Marsden, Famke Janssen, Bruce Davison, Rebecca Romijn, Anna Paquin	United States	
2001
Along Came a Spider	Lee Tamahori	Morgan Freeman, Monica Potter, Michael Wincott	United States	
Antitrust	Peter Howitt	Ryan Phillippe, Rachael Leigh Cook, Claire Forlani, Tim Robbins	United States	
The Barber	Michael Bafaro	Malcolm McDowell, Jeremy Ratchford, Garwin Sanford	United States	
Battle Royale	Kinji Fukasaku	Tatsuya Fujiwara	Japan	
Blue Spring	Toshiaki Toyoda	Ryuhei Matsuda, Hirofumi Arai, Sousuke Takaoka	Japan	
The Devil's Backbone	Guillermo del Toro	Marisa Paredes, Eduardo Noriega, Federico Luppi	Spain; Mexico	
Domestic Disturbance	Harold Becker	John Travolta, Vince Vaughn, Teri Polo	United States	
Don't Say a Word	Gary Fleder	Michael Douglas, Sean Bean, Brittany Murphy, Famke Janssen	United States	
Das Experiment	Oliver Hirschbiegel	Moritz Bleibtreu, Christian Berkel, Timo Dierkes	Germany	
Enigma	Michael Apted	Dougray Scott, Kate Winslet	United Kingdom; United States	Espionage thriller
The Fast and the Furious	Rob Cohen	Paul Walker, Vin Diesel, Michelle Rodriguez, Jordana Brewster, Rick Yune, Ted Levine	United States	Action thriller, crime thriller
Frailty	Bill Paxton	Bill Paxton, Matthew McConaughey, Powers Boothe	United States	
From Hell	Albert Hughes, Allen Hughes	Johnny Depp, Heather Graham	United States	
Fulltime Killer	Johnnie To	Andy Lau, Takashi Sorimachi, Simon Yam	Hong Kong	Action thriller
The Glass House	Daniel Sackheim	Leelee Sobieski, Diane Lane, Stellan Skarsgård	United States	
Hannibal	Ridley Scott	Anthony Hopkins, Julianne Moore	United States	
Intacto	Juan Carlos Fresnadillo	Leonardo Sbaraglia, Eusebio Poncela	Spain	
Joy Ride	John Dahl	Steve Zahn, Paul Walker, Leelee Sobieski	United States	
Kiss of the Dragon	Chris Nahon	Jet Li, Bridget Fonda, Tchéky Karyo	France; United States	
Megiddo: The Omega Code 2	Brian Trenchard-Smith	Michael York, Michael Biehn, John DeMita	United States	
Mulholland Drive	David Lynch	Justin Theroux, Naomi Watts, Laura Elena Harring, Ann Miller	United States	Psychological thriller
Nine Queens	Fabián Bielinsky	Ricardo Darín, Gastón Pauls, Leticia Brédice	Argentina	
The One	James Wong	Jet Li, Delroy Lindo, Carla Gugino, Jason Statham	United States	Action thriller
The Others	Alejandro Amenábar	Nicole Kidman	Spain	
Pulse	Kiyoshi Kurosawa	Haruhiko Kato, Kumiko Asō, Koyuki	Japan	Psychological thriller
Read my Lips	Jacques Audiard	Vincent Cassel, Emmanuelle Devos, Olivier Gourmet	France	
Session 9	Brad Anderson	Peter Mullan, David Caruso	United States	Psychological thriller
Soul Survivors	Stephen W. Carpenter	Melissa Sagemiller, Casey Affleck, Wes Bentley	United States	
Spy Game	Tony Scott	Robert Redford, Brad Pitt, Catherine McCormack	United States	
Swordfish	Dominic Sena	John Travolta, Hugh Jackman, Halle Berry, Don Cheadle, Vinnie Jones, Sam Shepard	United States	
Training Day	Antoine Fuqua	Denzel Washington, Ethan Hawke	United States	
Vanilla Sky	Cameron Crowe	Tom Cruise, Penélope Cruz, Cameron Diaz, Kurt Russell, Jason Lee, Noah Taylor	United States	
Zebra Lounge	Kari Skogland	Stephen Baldwin, Kristy Swanson	United States	
2002
2009: Lost Memories	Lee Si-Myung	Toru Nakamura, Jang Dong-gun, Ken Mitsuishi	South Korea	
2LDK	Yukihiko Tsutsumi	Eiko Koiki, Maho Nonami	Japan	
Abandon	Stephen Gaghan	Katie Holmes, Benjamin Bratt, Charlie Hunnam	United States	
And Now... Ladies and Gentlemen	Claude Lelouch	Jeremy Irons, Patricia Kaas, Thierry Lhermitte	France; United Kingdom	
Assassination Tango	Robert Duvall	Robert Duvall, Rubén Blades, Kathy Baker	United States	
Ballistic: Ecks vs. Sever	Kaos	Lucy Liu, Antonio Banderas	United States	Action thriller
Below	David Twohy	Bruce Greenwood, Matthew Davis, Olivia Williams	United States	
Blackwoods	Uwe Boll	Patrick Muldoon, Keegan Connor Tracy, Michael Paré	Canada; Germany	
Blade II	Guillermo del Toro	Wesley Snipes	United States	Action thriller
The Bourne Identity	Doug Liman	Matt Damon, Franka Potente, Chris Cooper	United States	Action thriller, paranoid thriller
City of Ghosts	Matt Dillon	Matt Dillon, Natascha McElhone, Gérard Depardieu	United States	
Collateral Damage	Andrew Davis	Arnold Schwarzenegger, Elias Koteas, Francesca Neri, Cliff Curtis, John Leguizamo, John Turturro	United States	Action thriller
The Dancer Upstairs	John Malkovich	Javier Bardem, Juan Diego Botto, Laura Morante	Spain; United States	
Dark Water	Hideo Nakata	Hitomi Kuroki, Rio Kanno, Mirei Oguchi	Japan	Supernatural thriller
Demonlover	Olivier Assayas	Connie Nielsen, Charles Berling, Chloë Sevigny	France	
Die Another Day	Lee Tamahori	Pierce Brosnan, Halle Berry, Toby Stephens, Rick Yune, Rosamund Pike, John Cleese, Judi Dench	United Kingdom	Action thriller
Dirty Pretty Things	Stephen Frears	Audrey Tautou, Chiwetel Ejiofor	United Kingdom	
Enough	Michael Apted	Jennifer Lopez, Billy Campbell, Juliette Lewis	United States	
Extreme Ops	Christian Duguay	Devon Sawa, Bridgette Wilson-Sampras, Rupert Graves	United States	Action thriller
The Eye	Danny Pang, Oxide Pang Chun	Lee Sin-Je, Lawrence Chou, Chutcha Rujinanon	Hong Kong	
Femme Fatale	Brian De Palma	Rebecca Romijn-Stamos, Antonio Banderas	United States	Crime thriller, erotic thriller
The Hard Word	Scott Roberts	Guy Pearce, Rachel Griffiths, Robert Taylor	United Kingdom; Australia	Crime thriller
He Loves Me, He Loves Me Not	Laetitia Colombani	Audrey Tautou, Samuel Le Bihan, Isabelle Carré	France	Psychological thriller
Insomnia	Christopher Nolan	Al Pacino, Robin Williams, Hilary Swank	United States	
Minority Report	Steven Spielberg	Tom Cruise, Colin Farrell, Samantha Morton, Max von Sydow	United States	Paranoid thriller
Murder By Numbers	Barbet Schroeder	Sandra Bullock, Ryan Gosling, Ben Chaplin, Michael Pitt	United States	
Narc	Joe Carnahan	Ray Liotta, Jason Patric, Chi McBride	United States	
The Nest	Florent Emilio Siri	Samy Naceri, Benoît Magimel, Nadia Farès, Pascal Greggory, Sami Bouajila	France	Action thriller
One Hour Photo	Mark Romanek	Robin Williams, Connie Nielsen, Michael Vartan	United States	
Panic Room	David Fincher	Jodie Foster, Forest Whitaker, Jared Leto, Dwight Yoakam, Kristen Stewart	United States	
The Quiet American	Phillip Noyce	Michael Caine, Brendan Fraser	United States; Australia	
Red Dragon	Brett Ratner	Anthony Hopkins, Edward Norton, Ralph Fiennes, Harvey Keitel, Mary-Louise Parker, Emily Watson, Philip Seymour Hoffman	United States	
Ripley's Game	Liliana Cavani	John Malkovich, Dougray Scott, Ray Winstone	United Kingdom; Italy	
The Salton Sea	D.J. Caruso	Val Kilmer	United States	
Signs	M. Night Shyamalan	Mel Gibson, Joaquin Phoenix	United States	Psychological thriller
Suicide Club	Sion Sono	Ryo Ishibashi, Masatoshi Nagase, Tamao Satō	Japan	
The Sum of All Fears	Phil Alden Robinson	Ben Affleck, Morgan Freeman, James Cromwell	United States	
Swimfan	John Polson	Jesse Bradford, Erika Christensen, Shiri Appleby	United States	
Three Blind Mice	Mathias Ledoux	Edward Furlong, Emilia Fox, Chiwetel Ejiofor	United Kingdom; France	
The Transporter	Corey Yuen	Jason Statham, Shu Qi	France; United States	Action thriller, crime thriller
Trapped	Luis Mandoki	Charlize Theron, Kevin Bacon, Courtney Love, Stuart Townsend, Dakota Fanning, Pruitt Taylor Vince	United States	
XXX	Rob Cohen	Vin Diesel, Asia Argento	United States	Action thriller
2003
2 Fast 2 Furious	John Singleton	Paul Walker, Tyrese Gibson, Eva Mendes	United States	Action thriller
Anatomy 2	Stefan Ruzowitzky	Barnaby Metschurat, Herbert Knaup, Heike Makatsch	Germany	
Basic	John McTiernan	John Travolta, Connie Nielsen, Samuel L. Jackson	United States	
Cold Creek Manor	Mike Figgis	Dennis Quaid, Sharon Stone, Stephen Dorff, Juliette Lewis, Kristen Stewart, Christopher Plummer	United States	
Confidence	James Foley	Edward Burns, Rachel Weisz, Andy García, Dustin Hoffman	United States	Crime thriller
Cradle 2 the Grave	Andrzej Bartkowiak	Jet Li, DMX	United States	Action thriller
Doppelganger	Kiyoshi Kurosawa	Kōji Yakusho, Nagasaku Hiromi, Hiromi Nagasaku	Japan	Psychological thriller
dot the i	Matthew Parkhill	Gael García Bernal, Natalia Verbeke	United Kingdom; Spain; United States	
Fear X	Nicolas Winding Refn	John Turturro, Deborah Kara Unger	Denmark; United Kingdom	
Goth	Brad Sykes	Phoebe Dollar, Laura Reilly, Dave Stann	United States	Psychological horror thriller
Gothika	Mathieu Kassovitz	Halle Berry, Robert Downey, Jr., Penelope Cruz	United States	Supernatural thriller
House of the Dead	Uwe Boll	Jonathan Cherry, Tyron Leitso, Clint Howard	Germany; United States; Canada	Action thriller
The i Inside	Roland Suso Richter	Ryan Phillippe, Sarah Polley	United States	
Identity	James Mangold	John Cusack, Ray Liotta, Amanda Peet	United States	
I'm Not Scared	Gabriele Salvatores	Aitana Sánchez-Gijón, Dino Abbrescia, Giorgio Careccia	Italy; United Kingdom; Spain	
In the Cut	Jane Campion	Meg Ryan, Mark Ruffalo, Jennifer Jason Leigh	United States	
Kill Bill: Volume 1	Quentin Tarantino	Uma Thurman, Lucy Liu, Vivica A. Fox, Daryl Hannah, Michael Madsen, David Carradine	United States	
Killing Words	Laura Mañà	Darío Grandinetti, Goya Toledo	Spain	
King of the Ants	Stuart Gordon	Chris L. McKenna, Kari Wührer, Daniel Baldwin	United States	Crime thriller, psychological thriller
Kontroll	Nimród Antal	Sándor Csányi, Zoltán Mucsi, Csaba Pindroch	Hungary	
Lucía, Lucía	Antonio Serrano	Cecilia Roth, Carlos Álvarez-Nóvoa, Kuno Becker	Mexico	Comedy thriller
Moon Child	Takahisa Zeze	Hideto Takarai, Gackt Camui	Japan	
Mystic River	Clint Eastwood	Sean Penn, Tim Robbins, Kevin Bacon, Laurence Fishburne, Laura Linney, Marcia Gay Harden	United States	Psychological thriller
Once Upon a Time in Mexico	Robert Rodriguez	Antonio Banderas, Salma Hayek, Johnny Depp	United States	Action thriller
Open Water	Chris Kentis	Blanchard Ryan, Daniel Travis, Saul Stein	United States	
Out of Time	Carl Franklin	Denzel Washington, Eva Mendes, Sanaa Lathan, Dean Cain	United States	
Phone Booth	Joel Schumacher	Colin Farrell, Forest Whitaker, Katie Holmes, Radha Mitchell, Kiefer Sutherland	United States	
The Recruit	Roger Donaldson	Al Pacino, Colin Farrell	United States	
Runaway Jury	Gary Fleder	John Cusack, Gene Hackman, Dustin Hoffman, Rachel Weisz	United States	
Running on Karma	Johnnie To, Wai Ka-fai	Andy Lau, Cecilia Cheung, Cheung Siu Fai	China; Hong Kong	Action thriller
Swimming Pool	François Ozon	Charlotte Rampling, Ludivine Sagnier	France	
A Tale of Two Sisters	Kim Jee-woon	Im Soo-jung, Moon Geun-young, Yum Jung-ah, Kim Kap-soo	South Korea	
Tears of the Sun	Antoine Fuqua	Bruce Willis	United States	Action thriller
Undermind	Nevil Dwek		United States	Psychological thriller
Underworld	Len Wiseman	Kate Beckinsale, Scott Speedman	United States	Action thriller
Veronica Guerin	Joel Schumacher	Cate Blanchett, Gerard McSorley	Ireland; United States	Crime thriller
Who Killed Bambi?	Gilles Marchand	Laurent Lucas, Sophie Quinton, Catherine Jacob	France	
X2	Bryan Singer	Hugh Jackman, Patrick Stewart, Ian McKellen, Halle Berry, James Marsden, Famke Janssen, Anna Paquin, Rebecca Romijn, Alan Cumming, Shawn Ashmore	United States	
2004
Blade: Trinity	David S. Goyer	Wesley Snipes, Jessica Biel, Ryan Reynolds	United States	Action thriller
Blueberry	Jan Kounen	Vincent Cassel, Juliette Lewis, Michael Madsen, Temuera Morrison	Mexico; France; United Kingdom	Supernatural thriller
The Bourne Supremacy	Paul Greengrass	Matt Damon, Joan Allen, Brian Cox	United States	Action thriller, paranoid thriller
The Butterfly Effect	Eric Bress, J. Mackye Gruber	Ashton Kutcher, Amy Smart	United States	
Cellular	David R. Ellis	Kim Basinger, Chris Evans, Jason Statham, William H. Macy	United States	
The Clearing	Pieter Jan Brugge	Robert Redford, Helen Mirren, Willem Dafoe	United States	
Collateral	Michael Mann	Tom Cruise, Jamie Foxx	United States	
The Crimson Rivers II: The Angels of the Apocalypse	Olivier Dahan	Jean Reno, Benoît Magimel, Camille Natta	France	
Dead Man's Shoes	Shane Meadows	Paddy Considine, Gary Stretch, Toby Kebbell	United Kingdom	
District B13	Pierre Morel	Cyril Raffaelli, David Belle, Tony D'Amario	France	Action thriller
EMR	James Erskine, Danny McCullough	Adam Leese	United Kingdom	
The Forgotten	Joseph Ruben	Julianne Moore, Dominic West	United States	
Freeze Frame	John Simpson	Lee Evans, Sean McGinley, Ian McNeice	United Kingdom; Ireland	
Godsend	Nick Hamm	Greg Kinnear, Rebecca Romijn-Stamos, Robert De Niro	United States; Canada	
I, Robot	Alex Proyas	Will Smith, Bridget Moynahan, Alan Tudyk, Bruce Greenwood	United States	
Je Suis un Assassin	Thomas Vincent	François Cluzet, Bernard Giraudeau, Karin Viard	France	
Kill Bill: Volume 2	Quentin Tarantino	Uma Thurman, David Carradine, Michael Madsen, Daryl Hannah	United States	Action thriller
Lethal	Dustin Rikert	Heather Marie Marsden, Lorenzo Lamas, Frank Zagarino	United States	
The Machinist	Brad Anderson	Christian Bale, Jennifer Jason Leigh	Spain; United States	
Man on Fire	Tony Scott	Denzel Washington, Dakota Fanning, Christopher Walken	United States	
The Manchurian Candidate	Jonathan Demme	Denzel Washington, Meryl Streep, Liev Schreiber, Jon Voight, Kimberly Elise	United States	
Mindhunters	Renny Harlin	LL Cool J, Kathryn Morris, Jonny Lee Miller, Val Kilmer, Christian Slater, Clifton Collins Jr.	Netherlands; Finland; United Kingdom; United States	
New Police Story	Benny Chan	Jackie Chan	China; Hong Kong	Action thriller
Night Watch	Timur Bekmambetov	Konstantin Khabensky, Vladimir Menshov, Valery Zolotukhin	Russia	Action thriller, supernatural thriller
November	Greg Harrison	Courteney Cox Arquette, James LeGros, Michael Ealy	United States	Psychological thriller
Oldboy	Park Chan-wook	Choi Min-sik	South Korea	
Premonition	Norio Tsuruta	Daisuke Ban, Maki Horikita	Japan	Psychological thriller
The Punisher	Jonathan Hensleigh	Thomas Jane, John Travolta, Rebecca Romijn, Ben Foster, Laura Elena Harring, Samantha Mathis, Roy Scheider	United States	Action thriller
Red Lights	Cédric Kahn	Jean-Pierre Darroussin, Carole Bouquet	France	
Secret Window	David Koepp	Johnny Depp, Maria Bello, Timothy Hutton, John Turturro	United States	
Spartan	David Mamet	Val Kilmer, Derek Luke, William H. Macy	United States; Germany	
Spider Forest	Song Il-gon	Kam Woo-sung, Seo Jeong-min, Kang Gyeong-heon	South Korea	Psychological thriller
Suspect Zero	E. Elias Merhige	Aaron Eckhart, Ben Kingsley, Carrie-Anne Moss	United States	
Taking Lives	D. J. Caruso	Angelina Jolie, Ethan Hawke, Kiefer Sutherland, Olivier Martinez, Gena Rowlands	United States	
Three Way	Scott Ziehl	Ali Larter, Desmond Harrington, Joy Bryant	United States	Crime thriller
Torque	Joseph Kahn	Martin Henderson, Ice Cube, Monet Mazur	United States	Action thriller
Trauma	Marc Evans	Colin Firth, Mena Suvari	United Kingdom	
Twisted	Philip Kaufman	Ashley Judd, Samuel L. Jackson, Andy García	United States	
Undertow	David Gordon Green	Jamie Bell, Josh Lucas, Devon Alan	United States	
The Village	M. Night Shyamalan	Joaquin Phoenix, Bryce Dallas Howard, Adrien Brody, William Hurt, Sigourney Weaver	United States	
Wild Things 2	Jack Perez	Susan Ward, Leila Arcieri, Isaiah Washington	United States	
2005
13 Tzameti	Géla Babluani	George Babluani	France	
Antibodies	Christian Alvart	Wotan Wilke Möhring, André Hennicke, Heinz Hoenig	Germany	
Assault on Precinct 13	Jean-François Richet	Ethan Hawke, Laurence Fishburne, Maria Bello, John Leguizamo, Brian Dennehy, Gabriel Byrne	United States	Action thriller
Batman Begins	Christopher Nolan	Christian Bale, Michael Caine, Morgan Freeman, Katie Holmes, Cillian Murphy, Liam Neeson, Gary Oldman, Ken Watanabe, Tom Wilkinson	United States	Action thriller
Blood Rain	Kim Dae-seung	Cha Seung-won, Park Yong-woo, Ji Sung	South Korea	
Caché	Michael Haneke	Daniel Auteuil, Juliette Binoche	Austria; Italy; Germany; France	
The Constant Gardener	Fernando Meirelles	Ralph Fiennes, Rachel Weisz, Danny Huston	United Kingdom	
Dark Water	Walter Salles, Jr.	Jennifer Connelly, John C. Reilly, Tim Roth	United States	Psychological thriller, supernatural thriller
Derailed	Mikael Håfström	Clive Owen, Jennifer Aniston, Vincent Cassel	United States	
Domino	Tony Scott	Keira Knightley, Mickey Rourke, Edgar Ramirez	United States	Crime thriller
Empire of the Wolves	Chris Nahon	Jean Reno, Jocelyn Quivrin, Arly Jover	France	
Flightplan	Robert Schwentke	Jodie Foster, Peter Sarsgaard, Sean Bean	United States	
Hard Candy	David Slade	Patrick Wilson, Elliot Page, Sandra Oh	United States	
Hide and Seek	John Polson	Robert De Niro, Dakota Fanning, Famke Janssen, Elisabeth Shue, Amy Irving	United States	
A History of Violence	David Cronenberg	Viggo Mortensen, Maria Bello, Ashton Holmes	Canada; United Kingdom	
Hostage	Florent Emilio Siri	Bruce Willis	United States	
The Interpreter	Sydney Pollack	Nicole Kidman, Sean Penn	United States	
The Jacket	John Maybury	Adrien Brody, Keira Knightley, Kris Kristofferson	United States; United Kingdom	
Lord of War	Andrew Niccol	Nicolas Cage, Jared Leto, Bridget Moynahan	United States	Crime thriller
Kill Zone	Wilson Yip	Donnie Yen, Sammo Hung	China; Hong Kong	Action thriller
Munich	Steven Spielberg	Eric Bana, Daniel Craig, Ciarán Hinds	United States	Political thriller
Red Eye	Wes Craven	Rachel McAdams, Cillian Murphy	United States	
Sin City	Robert Rodriguez, Frank Miller	Jessica Alba, Devon Aoki, Alexis Bledel	United States	Crime thriller
The Skeleton Key	Iain Softley	Kate Hudson, Gena Rowlands, Peter Sarsgaard	United States	
Stay	Marc Forster	Ewan McGregor, Ryan Gosling, Naomi Watts	United States	
Sympathy for Lady Vengeance	Park Chan-wook	Lee Young-ae, Kim Shi-hoo, Nam Il-woo	South Korea	
Syriana	Stephen Gaghan	George Clooney, Matt Damon, Jeffrey Wright	United States	
Transporter 2	Louis Leterrier	Jason Statham, Alessandro Gassman, Amber Valletta	France	Action thriller
White Noise	Geoffrey Sax	Michael Keaton, Chandra West, Deborah Kara Unger	United States; United Kingdom; Canada	
Wild Things: Diamonds in the Rough	Jay Lowi	Linden Ashby, Brad Johnson, Sandra McCoy	United States	
XXX: State of the Union	Lee Tamahori	Ice Cube, Willem Dafoe, Scott Speedman	United States	Action thriller
2006
Basic Instinct 2	Michael Caton-Jones	Sharon Stone, David Morrissey, David Thewlis, Charlotte Rampling	United States	
Black Book	Paul Verhoeven	Carice van Houten, Sebastian Koch, Thom Hoffman	Belgium; United Kingdom; Netherlands; Germany	
Bug	William Friedkin	Ashley Judd, Michael Shannon, Lynn Collins	United States	
Casino Royale	Martin Campbell	Daniel Craig, Eva Green, Mads Mikkelsen, Judi Dench	Czech Republic; Germany; United Kingdom; United States	
Children of Men	Alfonso Cuarón	Clive Owen, Julianne Moore, Michael Caine	United States	Action thriller
Comedy of Power	Claude Chabrol	Isabelle Huppert, François Berléand, Patrick Bruel	Germany; France	
Crank	Mark Neveldine, Brian Taylor	Jason Statham, Amy Smart, Dwight Yoakam	United States	Action thriller
The Da Vinci Code	Ron Howard	Tom Hanks, Audrey Tautou, Ian McKellen, Paul Bettany, Jean Reno, Jurgen Prochnow	United States	
The Departed	Martin Scorsese	Leonardo DiCaprio, Matt Damon, Jack Nicholson, Mark Wahlberg, Alec Baldwin, Martin Sheen, Vera Farmiga, Ray Winstone	United States	Crime thriller
Déjà Vu	Tony Scott	Denzel Washington, Jim Caviezel, Val Kilmer, Paula Patton, Bruce Greenwood	United States	
Exiled	Johnnie To	Nick Cheung, Simon Yam, Francis Ng	China; Hong Kong	Action thriller, crime thriller
The Fast and the Furious: Tokyo Drift	Justin Lin	Lucas Black, Bow Wow, Nathalie Kelley	United States	Action thriller, crime thriller
Fay Grim	Hal Hartley	Parker Posey, Jeff Goldblum, James Urbaniak	Germany; United States	
Firewall	Richard Loncraine	Harrison Ford, Paul Bettany, Virginia Madsen, Alan Arkin	United States	
Flash Point	Wilson Yip	Donnie Yen, Louis Koo, Collin Chou	Hong Kong; China	
Frontier(s)	Xavier Gens	Karina Testa, Aurelien Wiik, Patrick Ligardes	Switzerland; France	
Half Light	Craig Rosenberg	Demi Moore	United States; United Kingdom; Germany	
Inside Man	Spike Lee	Denzel Washington, Clive Owen, Jodie Foster	United States	Crime thriller
Lady in the Water	M. Night Shyamalan	Paul Giamatti, Bryce Dallas Howard	United States	
The Lives of Others	Florian Henckel von Donnersmarck	Martina Gedeck, Ulrich Mühe, Sebastian Koch	Germany	Political thriller
Like Minds	Gregory J. Read	Eddie Redmayne, Tom Sturridge, Toni Collette	United Kingdom; Australia	
Lucky Number Slevin	Paul McGuigan	Josh Hartnett, Morgan Freeman, Ben Kingsley, Lucy Liu, Stanley Tucci, Bruce Willis	United States	
The Marine	John Bonito	John Cena, Robert Patrick, Kelly Carlson	United States	Action thriller
Miami Vice	Michael Mann	Colin Farrell, Jamie Foxx, Gong Li	United States	Action thriller
Mission: Impossible III	J. J. Abrams	Tom Cruise, Philip Seymour Hoffman	United States	Action thriller
Movin' Too Fast	Eric Chambers	Layla Alexander, Marquita Terry, Matthew Glave, Jack Kehler, Eric Michael Cole	United States	Horror thriller
The Night Listener	Patrick Stettner	Robin Williams, Toni Collette, Bobby Cannavale	United States	Psychological thriller
The Page Turner	Denis Dercourt	Catherine Frot, Déborah François, Pascal Greggory	France	
Perfume: The Story of a Murderer	Tom Tykwer	Ben Whishaw, Alan Rickman	Spain; France; Germany	
The Prestige	Christopher Nolan	Hugh Jackman, Christian Bale, Scarlett Johansson, Michael Caine	United States; United Kingdom	
Pulse	Jim Sonzero	Kristen Bell, Ian Somerhalder, Rick Gonzalez	United States	Psychological thriller
Red Road	Andrea Arnold	Kate Dickie, Tony Curran, Martin Compston	Denmark; United Kingdom	
The Return	Asif Kapadia	Sarah Michelle Gellar	United States	
Running Scared	Wayne Kramer	Paul Walker	Germany; United States	
See No Evil	Gregory Dark	Kane	United States	Horror
The Sentinel	Clark Johnson	Michael Douglas, Kiefer Sutherland, Eva Longoria, Kim Basinger	United States	
Severance	Christopher Smith	Danny Dyer, Laura Harris, Tim McInnerny	Germany; United Kingdom	Action thriller
Snakes on a Plane	David R. Ellis	Samuel L. Jackson, Julianna Margulies, Nathan Phillips	United States	Action thriller
Tell No One	Guillaume Canet	François Cluzet, André Dussollier, Marie-Josée Croze	France	
Underworld: Evolution	Len Wiseman	Kate Beckinsale	United States	Action thriller
Unknown	Simon Brand	James Caviezel, Greg Kinnear	United States	
V for Vendetta	James McTeigue	Natalie Portman, Hugo Weaving	United States	
X-Men: The Last Stand	Brett Ratner	Hugh Jackman, Patrick Stewart, Ian McKellen, Famke Janssen, Halle Berry, Anna Paquin, James Marsden, Rebecca Romijn, Kelsey Grammer, Vinnie Jones, Elliot Page	United States; United Kingdom	
2007
Anamorph	H.S. Miller	Willem Dafoe, Scott Speedman, Clea DuVall	United States	
Anything for Her (Pour elle)	Fred Cavayé	Vincent Lindon, Diane Kruger, Lancelot Roch	France	
Awake	Joby Harold	Hayden Christensen, Jessica Alba, Terrence Howard	United States	
Before the Devil Knows You're Dead	Sidney Lumet	Philip Seymour Hoffman, Ethan Hawke, Marisa Tomei	United States	Crime thriller
Boarding Gate	Olivier Assayas	Asia Argento, Michael Madsen, Carl Ng	Luxembourg; France	
The Bourne Ultimatum	Paul Greengrass	Matt Damon, Julia Stiles, David Strathairn	United States	Action thriller, paranoid thriller
Death Proof	Quentin Tarantino	Kurt Russell, Rosario Dawson, Vanessa Ferlito, Jordan Ladd	United States	
Death Sentence	James Wan	Kevin Bacon, Garrett Hedlund, Kelly Preston, John Goodman	United States	Crime thriller
Disturbia	D. J. Caruso	Shia LaBeouf, David Morse, Carrie-Anne Moss, Sarah Roemer	United States	
Eastern Promises	David Cronenberg	Viggo Mortensen, Naomi Watts, Vincent Cassel	United Kingdom; Canada; United States	
First Snow	Mark Fergus	Guy Pearce, Piper Perabo	United States	
Flash Point	Wilson Yip	Donnie Yen, Louis Koo, Collin Chou	Hong Kong; China	
The Flock	Andrew Lau	Richard Gere, Claire Danes	United States	
Fracture	Gregory Hoblit	Anthony Hopkins, Ryan Gosling	United States	
Funny Games	Michael Haneke	Naomi Watts, Tim Roth, Michael Pitt	Italy; France; Germany; United States	
A Girl Cut in Two	Claude Chabrol	Ludivine Sagnier, Benoît Magimel, François Berléand	France; Germany	Comedy thriller
Gone Baby Gone	Ben Affleck	Morgan Freeman, Casey Affleck, Michelle Monaghan, Ed Harris, Amy Ryan, John Ashton	United States	
The Gray Man	Scott Flynn	Patrick Bauchau, Jack Conley, John Aylward	United States	
Hannibal Rising	Peter Webber	Gaspard Ulliel, Gong Li, Rhys Ifans	United Kingdom; France; United States	Psychological thriller
Hitman	Xavier Gens	Timothy Olyphant, Dougray Scott, Olga Kurylenko	United States	Action thriller
I Know Who Killed Me	Chris Sivertson	Lindsay Lohan, Julia Ormond, Neal McDonough	United States	
Illegal Tender	Franc. Reyes	Rick Gonzalez, Wanda De Jesus, Dania Ramirez	United States	
The Invasion	Oliver Hirschbiegel	Nicole Kidman, Daniel Craig, Jeremy Northam	United States	
The Invisible	David S. Goyer	Justin Chatwin, Margarita Levieva	United States	
Jar City	Baltasar Kormákur	Ingvar E. Sigurdsson, Agusta Eva Erlendsdottir, Björn Hlynur Haraldsson	Iceland; Denmark; Germany	
Joshua	George Ratliff	Sam Rockwell, Vera Farmiga, Celia Weston	United States	
Live Free or Die Hard	Len Wiseman	Bruce Willis, Justin Long, Timothy Olyphant, Mary Elizabeth Winstead	United States	Action thriller
Michael Clayton	Tony Gilroy	George Clooney, Tom Wilkinson, Tilda Swinton	United States	
Mr. Brooks	Bruce A. Evans	Kevin Costner, Demi Moore, Dane Cook, William Hurt	United States	
Next	Lee Tamahori	Nicolas Cage, Julianne Moore, Jessica Biel, Thomas Kretschmann	United States	
No Country for Old Men	Ethan Coen, Joel Coen	Tommy Lee Jones, Javier Bardem, Josh Brolin	United States	
The Number 23	Joel Schumacher	Jim Carrey, Virginia Madsen, Logan Lerman, Danny Huston	United States	
P2	Franck Khalfoun	Wes Bentley, Rachel Nichols	United States	
Perfect Stranger	James Foley	Halle Berry, Bruce Willis, Giovanni Ribisi	United States	
Planet Terror	Robert Rodriguez	Rose McGowan, Freddy Rodríguez, Josh Brolin	United States	Action thriller
Premonition	Mennan Yapo	Sandra Bullock	United States	
Roman de Gare	Claude Lelouch	Dominique Pinon, Fanny Ardant, Audrey Dana	France	
Seraphim Falls	David Von Ancken	Liam Neeson, Pierce Brosnan	United States; United Kingdom	Action thriller
Shooter	Antoine Fuqua	Mark Wahlberg, Danny Glover, Kate Mara, Ned Beatty	United States	
Smokin' Aces	Joe Carnahan	Ben Affleck, Andy García, Taraji P. Henson, Alicia Keys, Ray Liotta, Chris Pine, Ryan Reynolds	United States	Crime thriller, action thriller
Stuck	Stuart Gordon	Mena Suvari, Stephen Rea, Russell Hornsby	Canada; United States	
Ten 'til Noon	Scott Storm	Alfonso Freeman	United States	
Three	Robby Henson	Marc Blucas, Laura Jordan, Justine Waddell	United States	
Timecrimes	Nacho Vigalondo	Karra Elejalde, Barbara Goenaga, Nacho Vigalondo	Spain	Crime thriller, supernatural thriller
War	Phillip Atwell	Jet Li, Jason Statham	United States	Action thriller
2008
21	Robert Luketic	Jim Sturgess, Kevin Spacey, Kate Bosworth	United States	
88 Minutes	Jon Avnet	Al Pacino, Alicia Witt, Leelee Sobieski, Amy Brenneman, Deborah Kara Unger, Benjamin McKenzie, William Forsythe, Neal McDonough	United States; Germany	
Aduri	Riyadh Mahmood	Ariana Almajan, Kawan Karadaghi, Roger Payano, Christy Sullivan	United States	
The Baader Meinhof Complex	Uli Edel	Martina Gedeck, Moritz Bleibtreu, Johanna Wokalek	Germany	Political thriller
Bangkok Dangerous	Oxide Pang Chun, Danny Pang	Nicolas Cage	United States	
The Caller	Richard Ledes	Frank Langella, Elliott Gould, Laura Elena Harring	United States	
Cassandra's Dream	Woody Allen	Colin Farrell, Ewan McGregor	France; United States	
Changeling	Clint Eastwood	Angelina Jolie, John Malkovich, Jeffrey Donovan	United States	
Death Race	Paul W. S. Anderson	Jason Statham, Joan Allen, Tyrese Gibson	United States	Sports thriller
Deception	Marcel Langenegger	Ewan McGregor, Hugh Jackman, Michelle Williams	United States	
Donkey Punch	Olly Blackburn	Robert Boulter, Sian Breckin, Tom Burke	United Kingdom	
Eagle Eye	D. J. Caruso	Shia LaBeouf, Michelle Monaghan, Rosario Dawson, Billy Bob Thornton	United States	
Iron Man	Jon Favreau	Robert Downey Jr., Gwyneth Paltrow, Jeff Bridges, Terrence Howard	United States	
Loss	Maris Martinsons	Andrius Mamontovas, Valda Bičkutė, Kostas Smoriginas	Lithuania	
The Eye	David Moreau, Xavier Palud	Jessica Alba	United States	Psychological thriller
The Happening	M. Night Shyamalan	Mark Wahlberg, Zooey Deschanel, John Leguizamo	United States	
The Haunting of Molly Hartley	Mickey Liddell	Haley Bennett, Chace Crawford, Shannon Marie Woodward	United States	
The Horsemen	Jonas Åkerlund	Dennis Quaid, Zhang Ziyi	United States	
Just Another Love Story	Ole Bornedal	Anders W. Berthelsen, Rebecka Hemse, Nikolaj Lie Kaas	Denmark	
Lakeview Terrace	Neil LaBute	Samuel L. Jackson, Kerry Washington, Patrick Wilson	United States	
The Life Before Her Eyes	Vadim Perelman	Uma Thurman, Evan Rachel Wood, Eva Amurri	United States	
Max Payne	John Moore	Mark Wahlberg, Mila Kunis, Beau Bridges, Ludacris, Chris O'Donnell	United States	Crime thriller
The Oxford Murders	Álex de la Iglesia	Elijah Wood, John Hurt, Leonor Watling	France; Spain	
Pathology	Marc Schoelermann	Milo Ventimiglia, Alyssa Milano, Lauren Lee Smith	United States	Crime thriller
Poison Ivy: The Secret Society	Jason Hreno	Miriam McDonald, Crystal Lowe	Canada; United States	
Quantum of Solace	Marc Forster	Daniel Craig, Olga Kurylenko, Mathieu Amalric, Gemma Arterton, Judi Dench	United Kingdom	
Rambo	Sylvester Stallone	Sylvester Stallone, Julie Benz, Matthew Marsden	United States	Action thriller
Redbelt	David Mamet	Chiwetel Ejiofor, Emily Mortimer, Alice Braga	United States	
Reykjavík-Rotterdam	Oskar Jonasson	Baltasar Kormákur, Victor Löw, Ingvar E. Sigurdsson	Netherlands; Iceland	
Righteous Kill	Jon Avnet	Robert De Niro, Al Pacino, Curtis Jackson	United States	
The Incredible Hulk	Louis Leterrier	Edward Norton, Liv Tyler, Tim Roth, William Hurt, Tim Blake Nelson	United States	
The Square	Nash Edgerton	David Roberts, Claire van der Boom, Joel Edgerton	Australia	
Street Kings	David Ayer	Keanu Reeves, Forest Whitaker, Hugh Laurie	United States	Action/Crime/Drama
Surveillance	Jennifer Chambers Lynch	Bill Pullman, Julia Ormond, Pell James	United States	
Taken	Pierre Morel	Liam Neeson, Maggie Grace, Famke Janssen	France	
The Objective	Daniel Myrick	Jon Huertas, Jonas Ball, Matt Anderson	United States	
Transsiberian	Brad Anderson	Woody Harrelson, Emily Mortimer, Ben Kingsley	United States	
Untraceable	Gregory Hoblit	Diane Lane, Billy Burke, Colin Hanks	United States	
Valkyrie	Bryan Singer	Tom Cruise, Kenneth Branagh, Bill Nighy	United States	Political thriller
Vantage Point	Pete Travis	Dennis Quaid, Matthew Fox, Forest Whitaker, Sigourney Weaver, William Hurt	United States	
The X-Files: I Want to Believe	Chris Carter	David Duchovny, Gillian Anderson, Amanda Peet	United States	Supernatural thriller
2009
12 Rounds	Renny Harlin	John Cena, Ashley Scott, Brian J. White, Aidan Gillen	United States	
Amer	Hélène Cattet, Bruno Forzani	Bianca Maria D'Amato	France; Belgium	
American Sunset	Michael Masucci	Corey Haim	Canada	
Angels & Demons	Ron Howard	Tom Hanks, Ayelet Zurer, Ewan McGregor	United States	
Armored	Nimród Antal	Matt Dillon, Jean Reno, Laurence Fishburne	United States	
Crank: High Voltage	Mark Neveldine, Brian Taylor	Jason Statham, Amy Smart, Dwight Yoakam	United States	Action/Crime/Sci-fi
Chloe	Atom Egoyan	Liam Neeson, Julianne Moore, Amanda Seyfried	France; United States; Canada	
The Disappearance of Alice Creed	J Blakeson	Gemma Arterton, Martin Compston, Eddie Marsan	United Kingdom	
Dolan's Cadillac	Jeff Beesley	Christian Slater, Emmanuelle Vaugier, Wes Bentley	Canada	
Duplicity	Tony Gilroy	Julia Roberts, Clive Owen, Tom Wilkinson	United States	
Echelon Conspiracy	Greg Marcks	Shane West, Edward Burns, Ving Rhames	United States	
Espion(s)	Nicolas Saada	Vincent Regan, Stephen Rea, Archie Panjabi	United Kingdom; France	
Exam	Stuart Hazeldine		United Kingdom	
Gamer	Mark Neveldine, Brian Taylor	Gerard Butler, Milo Ventimiglia	United States	
The Girl Who Kicked the Hornets' Nest	Daniel Alfredson	Noomi Rapace, Michael Nyqvist, Annika Hallin	Sweden	
The Girl Who Played with Fire	Daniel Alfredson	Noomi Rapace, Michael Nyqvist, Annika Hallin	Sweden	Crime thriller
The Girl with the Dragon Tattoo	Niels Arden Oplev	Michael Nyqvist, Noomi Rapace, Noomi Rapace	Sweden	
Harry Brown	Daniel Barber	Michael Caine, Emily Mortimer, Charlie Creed-Miles	United Kingdom	
The International	Tom Tykwer	Clive Owen, Naomi Watts	United States	
Killshot	John Madden	Diane Lane, Mickey Rourke	United States	
Knowing	Alex Proyas	Nicolas Cage, Rose Byrne	United States	
Law Abiding Citizen	F. Gary Gray	Jamie Foxx, Gerard Butler, Colm Meaney	United States	
Obsessed	Steve Shill	Beyoncé Knowles, Idris Elba, Ali Larter	United States	
A Perfect Getaway	David N. Twohy	Timothy Olyphant, Steve Zahn, Milla Jovovich	United States	
Push	Paul McGuigan	Chris Evans, Dakota Fanning, Camilla Belle, Djimon Hounsou	United States; Hong Kong	
Sherlock Holmes	Guy Ritchie	Robert Downey Jr., Jude Law, Rachel McAdams	United States	Action thriller
The Stepfather	Nelson McCormick	Dylan Walsh, Sela Ward, Penn Badgley	United States	
Street Fighter: The Legend of Chun Li	Andrzej Bartkowiak	Kristin Kreuk, Michael Clarke Duncan, Neal McDonough, Chris Klein, Moon Bloodgood	United States	Action Thriller
The Taking of Pelham 123	Tony Scott	Denzel Washington, John Travolta, James Gandolfini, John Turturro	United States	
The Secret in Their Eyes	Juan José Campanella	Ricardo Darín, Soledad Villamil, Pablo Rago	Argentina	
Vengeance	Johnnie To	Cheung Siu Fai, Johnny Hallyday, Ng Yuk-sau	France; Hong Kong	
Whiteout	Dominic Sena	Kate Beckinsale, Columbus Short, Gabriel Macht, Tom Skerritt	United States	
X-Men Origins: Wolverine	Gavin Hood	Hugh Jackman, Liev Schreiber, Danny Huston	United States	
