= Éric Savin =

French film and television actor (born 1964)

- Savin in 2019
- Born: November 14, 1964 (age 61); Dijon, France
- Occupations: Actor, director
- Years active: 1989-present

Éric Savin (born 14 November 1964) is a French film and television actor.

== Biography ==
Savin comes from a rugby family, which meant he was more interested in a sports career. But a strong conviction led him to Paris to try a career as an actor. He was a hospital agent at the Bichat hospital in Paris from 1985 to 1988, and then passed the Drama school Cours Florent free class competition. It was during an audition that he met Xavier Durringer (playwright, screenwriter and filmmaker) with whom he still works today.

He made his stage debut in 1989 in Lorenzaccio (written by Alfred de Musset) directed by Francis Huster. Bertrand Tavernier entrusted him with his first cinema role in 1992, as Inspector Lefort in L.627. He then alternated between theater, television and cinema. His first theatre successes came with Durringer's shows like La Petite Entaille in 1991, or Sureur in 1997, presented at the Avignon Festival.

In 1993, he starred with actress Karin Viard in La nage indienne (the Indian Swim), in the first feature film by Durringer. Then he had several supporting roles including Giordano in Emmène-moi (Take me) by Michel Spinosa, distinguished at the Berlin International Film Festival and Captain Conan again with Tavernier in 1996, followed by I Hate Love (J'ai horreur de l'amour) by Laurence Ferreira Barbosa in 1997 then in 1998 social film Une minute de silence ('One minute of silence') the first film of Florent Emilio Siri. He returned to work with Durringer on J'irai au paradis car l'enfer est ici (I'll go to heaven because hell is here) in 1997, a film about gangsters.

He got a nomination to the Sept d'or for his portrayal of a divorced father who kidnaps his daughter in the television movie Vacances volées (or Stolen Vacation), directed by Olivier Panchot. He also accompanied many filmmakers and directors from short to feature films, such as Laurent Firode (Les astres (The Stars) in 1998, Happenstance (The Butterfly's Wing Flapping) in 2000), with Pierre-Erwan Guillaume in Bonne résistance à la douleur, (Good resistance to pain) in 1999 and L'Ennemi naturel (The Natural Enemy) in 2004. Then with Lyčče Boukhitine, for which he takes the character in her short film La Vielle barrière (The old barrier), which won a 'jury prize' at the festival of Clermont-Ferrand in 1998. Finally in 2002, he plays in the famous short film Squash directed by Lionel Bailliu, which was multi-award-winning in several festivals around the world, including the interpretation prize in Clermont-Ferrand. Lionel Bailliu won an Oscar nomination in 2004 for Best Live Action Short Film. This performance lead to Savin to take the leading role of the boss in the feature film adaptation in 2006 entitled Fair Play where he co-stars, alongside Marion Cotillard and Benoît Magimel.

Now occasionally called a chameleon actor, Savin crossed many universes like those of Sébastien Lifshitz (The Cold lands (Telefilm in 1999), Presque rien (Almost nothing) in 2000, or Laetitia Colombani in À la folie... pas du tout (To the madness not at all) in 2002. He worked again in 2002, with Xavier Durringer for Quoi dire de plus du coq (The Ears on the back), a television movie for Arte, adapted from a short story by Georges Arnaud (who wrote The Wages of Fear), a pursuit race across the Amazon. In the theater, he plays 'Franck Meyer' in duet with Zabou Breitman in Hilda, directed by Frédéric Belier-Garcia, at the Théâtre de l'Atelier, Paris. More recently at the cinema he played alongside the Cassel / Bellucci couple in Frédéric Schoendoerffer's Secret Agents in 2004.

In 2008, with over 80 roles to his credit, he shot the Scalp television series for Canal +, where he played Raphael, a trader in eight episodes. At the same time, he was at the Théâtre La Bruyère, in Chocolat Piment written by Christine Reverho, directed by José Paul (five nominations at Molières), and then recently in Sans mentir (Without a lie) by Xavier Daughreil at the Théâtre Tristan-Bernard, Paris.

He returned to cinema in the political thriller Une affaire d'État (A State affair) directed by Eric Valette in 2009, Copacabana by Marc Fitoussi in 2010, and Une pièce montée (Mounted Piece), adapted from the bestseller by Blandine Le Callet, a choral film bringing together several generations of actors and directed by Denys Granier-Deferre. As well as performing in Captifs, first feature film by Yann Gozlan in 2010, which won the grand prize of the Gérardmer 2007 International Fantastic Film Festival.

He appeared in one episode of the television series Clash, as Daniel, which was broadcast on France 2 in 2012.

In 2013, he directed his first short film Cadrage/débordement based on a man about play his first rugby match. He also starred in a sequel to Lady Bar (TV movie), Lady bar 2 directed by Xavier Durringer, set in Thailand.

In 2014, he played the sadistic of the subject heroine of Les Heures souterraines (The underground hours), a television movie for Arte, directed by Philippe Harel taken from the eponymous novel by Delphine Le Vigan.

He appeared on The Chalet on France 2, which is now on Netflix.

In 2018, he returned to the stage for a play written by François Bégaudeau, Au Début at the Théâtre Le Petit Louvre in Avignon.

== Filmography ==
- 1992 : L'Échappée belle directed by Antoine Vaton
- 1992 : L.627 by Bertrand Tavernier
- 1993 : La Nage indienne by Xavier Durringer
- 1994 : Emmène-moi by Michel Spinosa
- 1996 : Chacun cherche son chat by Cédric Klapisch
- 1997 : J'ai horreur de l'amour by Laurence Ferreira Barbosa
- 1997 : J'irai au paradis car l'enfer est ici by Xavier Durringer
- 1999 : Au cœur du mensonge by Claude Chabrol
- 1999 : Bonne résistance à la douleur (court-métrage) by Pierre-Erwan Guillaume
- 2000 : The Libertine by Gabriel Aghion
- 2000 : Presque rien by Sébastien Lifshitz
- 2000 : Le Battement d'ailes du papillon by Laurent Firode
- 2001 : Mes amis d'en France by Laurent Vinas-Raymond
- 2002 : À la folie... pas du tout by Laetitia Colombani
- 2004 : Secret Agents by Frédéric Schoendoerffer
- 2004 : L'Ennemi naturel by Pierre-Erwan Guillaume
- 2005 : Alex by José Alcala
- 2005 : Avant qu'il ne soit trop tard by Laurent Dussaux
- 2005 : Quartier V.I.P. by Laurent Firode
- 2005 : Léoléa by Nicolas Brossette
- 2006 : Fair Play by Lionel Bailliu
- 2006 : Tell No One by Guillaume Canet
- 2006 : Les Petites vacances by Olivier Peyon
- 2006 : La Vie d'artiste by Marc Fitoussi
- 2007 : Le Dernier Voyage by Frédéric Duvin (court métrage)
- 2007 : Intimate Enemies by Florent Emilio Siri
- 2007 : Anna M by Michel Spinosa
- 2007 : Lady Bar by Xavier Durringer
- 2008 : La différence c'est que c'est pas pareil by Pascal Laëthier : Pierre
- 2009 : Une affaire d'État by Éric Valette
- 2010 : Pièce montée by Denys Granier-Deferre
- 2010 : Captifs by Yann Gozlan
- 2010 : Copacabana by Marc Fitoussi
- 2011 : Les Aventures de Philibert, capitaine puceau by Sylvain Fusée
- 2012 : My Way by Florent Emilio Siri
- 2012 : Mauvaise fille by Patrick Mille
- 2012 : Par amour by Laurent Firode
- 2013 : Denis by Lionel Bailliu
- 2013 : Les Reines du ring by Jean-Marc Rudnicki
- 2015 : A Perfect Man by Yann Gozlan
- 2015 : Elle by Paul Verhoeven
- 2016 : Vendeur by Sylvain Desclous
- 2017 : De toutes mes forces by Chad Chenouga
- 2021 : The Deep House by Julien Maury and Alexandre Bustillo : Pierre Montégnac
