= Déjà mort =

- French DVD cover
- Directed by: Olivier Dahan
- Written by: Olivier Dahan; Olivier Massart
- Produced by: Yves Attal
- Starring: Romain Duris; Benoît Magimel; Zoé Félix
- Cinematography: Pierre David
- Edited by: Juliette Welfling
- Music by: Bruno Coulais
- Production company: Canal+
- Distributed by: UGC Fox Distribution
- Release date: 22 April 1998
- Running time: 108 minutes
- Country: France
- Language: French

Déjà mort is a 1998 French drama film directed by Olivier Dahan. It stars Romain Duris and Benoît Magimel.

== Cast ==
- Romain Duris as Romain
- Benoît Magimel as David
- Zoé Félix as Laure
- Clément Sibony as Andrea
- Isaac Sharry as Alain
- Philippe Martinez
