= For a Woman =

- Theatrical release poster
- French: Pour une femme
- Directed by: Diane Kurys
- Written by: Diane Kurys
- Produced by: Jérémie Chevret
- Starring: Benoît Magimel; Mélanie Thierry; Nicolas Duvauchelle
- Cinematography: Gilles Henry
- Edited by: Sylvie Gadmer
- Music by: Armand Amar
- Distributed by: EuropaCorp
- Release dates: 12 June 2013 (Cabourg); 3 July 2013 (France)
- Running time: 110 minutes
- Country: France
- Language: French
- Budget: $8.7 million
- Box office: $1.2 million

For a Woman (original title: Pour une femme) is a 2013 French drama film directed by Diane Kurys.

== Plot ==
In the 1980s, following the death of their mother, sisters Anne (Sylvie Testud) and Tania (Julie Ferrier) clean out their mother's belongings. Coming across a man's ring among her mother's jewellery Anne, who is a filmmaker, becomes intrigued and begins researching and writing a story about the ring. She eventually discovers a photo of her estranged uncle Jean wearing the ring while posing with her mother and sister.

In 1946, just after World War II Soviet Jewish immigrants Léna and Michel arrive in Paris after escaping a concentration camp during the Holocaust and crossing the Alps. They apply for French citizenship as Michel was raised in France and fought for the French Foreign Legion. Léna reveals she is pregnant and gives birth to a girl the couple name Tania. In Lyon the couple make inroads with the underground Communist Party of France. After they are successful in their bid for citizenship Michel opens a taylor's shop making men's custom suits. He is interrupted one day by Léna who tells him a man claiming to be his brother, Jean, has showed up on their doorstep. Michel embraces Jean and treats him as one of the family but later reveals to Léna that he is unsure if the man actually is his brother as his brother Jean was only 9 when he left home and he can't remember what he looked like. He also becomes suspicious when Jean's story of how he came to Paris changes repeatedly.

Jean soon makes himself indispensable to Michel, helping him to procure hard to find cloth and transforming his business to ready-to-wear instead of custom made suits. As a result of his newfound success Michel buys a car, a fridge and For a Woman perfume for Léna.

While out for a stroll, Léna reveals to Jean that her marriage to Michel was a sham; arriving at a concentration camp, the guard in charge recognized Michel and told him he could leave. Michel then asked if he could bring his fiancée with him and proposed marriage to Léna without knowing her. While walking Jean realizes he is being followed but manages to escape. Eventually returning home Jean tells Michel that he works for the GRU, abducting and repatriating Red Army soldiers who have defected to the Free World.

Léna begins to feel attracted to Jean and eventually kisses him, when she thinks he will leave. Jean refuses to sleep with her and angrily criticizes Michel after they hear news about the award winning and recently published memoirs of Soviet defector Victor Kravchenko over the radio. Michel calls Kravchenko a traitor who defected out of Capitalist greed and who deserves to die, but Jean correctly accuses the Soviet NKVD of reopening Nazi death camps and filling them with political prisoners. Jean compares Joseph Stalin to Adolf Hitler and denounces Stalinism as no different than Nazism. Jean also accuses Michel of blindly following the party line and therefore being no different than the Nazis who murdered their parents. Michel explodes and tries to physically assault Jean, and then orders him to leave both the flat and his life forever. Frustrated with his brother and sister-in-law, Jean relocates and drops contact with his family.

Michel is approached by French police who tell him his brother is wanted for murder after killing an Alsatian who he had been wrongly believed to be an ex-Nazi. Léna is finally approached by a friend of Jean's who gives her an envelope to give to him and tells her where he is. Léna goes to visit him and Jean reveals that he really works for the Irgun and his actual mission is finding and killing Nazi war criminals before they can escape Europe. He now plans to use the money in the envelope Léna delivered to make Aliyah to the Mandate of Palestine. Before he leaves, however Jean and Léna finally have sex. Despite Léna wanting to flee with him, Jean tells her to stay with his brother. However, as she is leaving the hotel she sees police and goes back to Jean's hotel room to warn him. The two manage to escape but need Michel's help to cross the border. Despite Michel's anger over Jean's anti-Stalinism and he and Léna's relationship, he does help Jean cross the border by giving him his passport and by bringing Léna's as well, so she may go with him. Léna ultimately decides to return with Michel.

Despite this, their relationship is fractured when Léna gives birth to Anne the following spring and the two finally end their marriage six years later with Léna raising Anne far from Michel.

In 1990 Anne rushes to Ardèche, where her father has been hospitalized. She tells him that her film about his brother is now opening in Japan. Michel tells her that out of the whole story what he remembers most is falling in love with Léna. Michel dies in hospital and Anne and Tania gather to clear out his home. While there, Tania discovers their mother's bottle of For a Woman perfume, which her father has kept all those years.

== Cast ==
- Benoît Magimel as Michel
- Mélanie Thierry as Lena
- Nicolas Duvauchelle as Jean
- Sylvie Testud as Anne
- Denis Podalydès as Maurice
- Julie Ferrier as Tania
- Clotilde Hesme as Madeleine
- Clément Sibony as Sacha
- Marc Ruchmann as Paul

== Critical response ==
On review aggregator website Rotten Tomatoes, the film has an approval rating of 90%, based on ten reviews, with an average rating of 6.33/10. On Metacritic, which assigns a normalized rating, the film has a score of 59 out of 100, based on 7 critics, indicating "mixed or average reviews".

The Hollywood Reporter's reviewer Boyd van Hoeij stated that the film was "handsomely put together" and found that Armand Amar's film score supported the transitions between temporal levels.

== Notes ==
The film had its roots in director Diane Kurys' coming across an old photograph of her father's mysterious brother, Jean, a decade ago. Her father, said Kurys, 'was always very angry with my uncle, and the two men never spoke - there were insinuations that something had happened involving my mother.' Kurys had been told by her mother, when her mother was dying of cancer in the early 1980s, that at her birth Kurys' father did not want to touch her, or talk to her. Since the photograph of her uncle Jean had been from some time in 1947, months before Kurys was born, she wondered whether she could have been the child of a liaison between her mother and uncle. The film is Kurys' creative imagining of that possible affair together with real memories of her parents' troubled marriage.
