= Laetitia Colombani =

French filmmaker, writer and actress (born 1976)

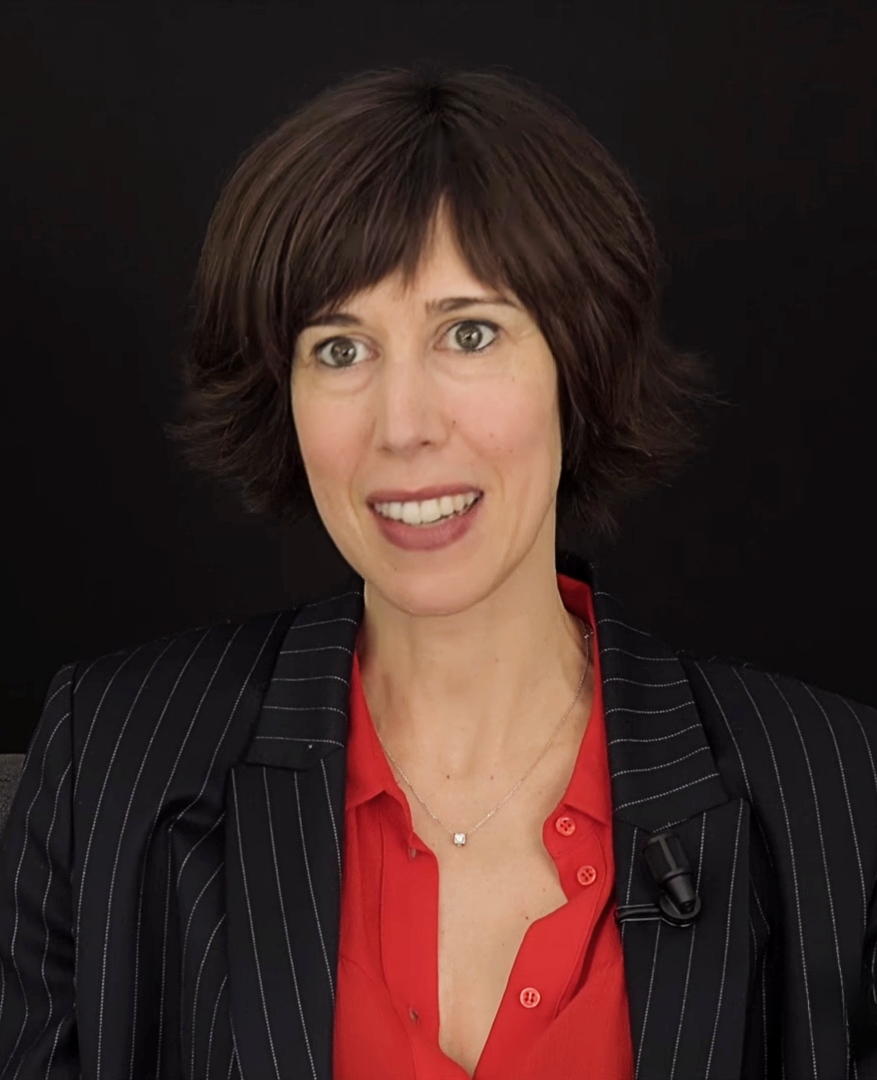
- Colombani in 2017
- Born: 1976 (age 49–50); Bordeaux, France
- Education: École nationale supérieure Louis-Lumière
- Occupations: Filmmaker; writer; actress
- Writing career
- Language: French
- Years active: 1998–present

Laetitia Colombani (born 1976) is a French filmmaker, writer and actress.

== Early life and education ==
Laetitia Colombani was born in 1976 in the Caudéran quartier of Bordeaux. She then lived in Talence and Gradignan. Her father is a construction engineer. Her mother was a librarian at the Collège de Monjous, where she was a student.

Colombani earned a baccalauréat at the Lycée Victor Louis. At age 18, she moved to Nantes to complete a two-year preparatory class at the Ciné-Sup. She then entered the École nationale supérieure Louis-Lumière, from which she received her diploma in 1998.

== Career ==
Colombani's film career began with several short films, including Le Dernier bip (1998) and Mémoire de puce (1999). She made her feature directorial debut with He Loves Me... He Loves Me Not (2002), starring Audrey Tautou. She also directed the comedy Mes stars et moi (2008), starring Kad Merad, Catherine Deneuve, Emmanuelle Béart and Mélanie Bernier.

As an author, Colombani received international attention in 2017 with her first novel, The Braid (La Tresse), for which she received several awards and sold 2 million copies in France. It tells the story of three women with very different destinies, living in India, Sicily and Canada. Colombani herself adapted the novel into the film The Braid (2023), which she also directed. The film was a major success in France, where it sold 1.3 million admissions. A stage adaptation of La Tresse, written by Colombani, is being performed at the Théâtre de la Renaissance in Paris from 25 September 2026 until 10 January 2027. Mise-en-scène is by Johanna Boyé.

Colombani's second novel, Les Victorieuses, was published in 2019. Her third novel, Le Cerf-volant, followed in 2021.

== Personal life ==
As of 2021, Colombani lived in Paris. She frequently returns to the Gironde region, where her family still lives. She also spends her summers in the resort town of Arcachon.

== Filmography ==
=== As director ===
==== Feature films ====
- 2002 : He Loves Me... He Loves Me Not
- 2008 : Mes stars et moi
- 2023 : The Braid

==== Short films ====
- 1998 : Le Dernier Bip
- 2003 : Une fleur pour Marie
- 2003 : Quelques mots d'amour
- 2003 : Casting urgent

=== As actress ===
- 1998 : Le Dernier Bip by Laetitia Colombani (short film) : Emma Merowski
- 1998 : Cousin Bette by Des McAnuff : non créditée au générique
- 2002 : Paradisco by Stéphane Ly-Cuong : la femme aux chocolats
- 2003 : La Faucheuse by Vincenzo Marano and Patrick Timsit (short film) : Marie
- 2003 : Gomez et Tavarès by Gilles Paquet-Brenner : Séverine
- 2003 : Casting urgent by Laetitia Colombani (short film) : la directrice du casting
- 2004 : Qui mange quand ? by Jean-Paul Lilienfeld (TV film) : l'hôtesse du breakfast
- 2005 : Libre échange by Olivier de Plas (short film) : Florence
- 2005 : Belle, enfin possible by Régis Roinsard (short film) : la standardiste
- 2005 : Pas bouger ! by Xavier Daugreilh (short film) : la mère
- 2005 : Retiens-moi by Jean-Pierre Igoux (TV film) : Virginie
- 2008 : Mes stars et moi by Laetitia Colombani : La Psy-chat-nalyste
- 2012 : My Way by Florent-Emilio Siri : Vline Buggy
- 2014 : J'aurais pas dû mettre mes Clarks by Marie Caldera (short film) : la réalisatrice
- 2015 : La Boule noire by Denis Malleval (TV film) : Madame Fabre
- 2019 : Fête de famille by Cédric Kahn : Marie
- 2021 : The Accusation by Yvan Attal : La Psychologue

== Bibliography ==
- La Tresse, Paris, Grasset, 2017
- Les Victorieuses, Paris, Grasset, 2019
- Le Cerf-volant, Paris, Grasset, 2021
