= The King of Algiers =

2023 French film by Elias Belkeddar

- French: Omar la fraise
- Literally: Omar the Strawberry
- Directed by: Elias Belkeddar
- Written by: Elias Belkeddar, Thomas Bidegain, Jérôme Pierrat
- Produced by: Mourad Belkeddar; Hugo Sélignac
- Starring: Reda Kateb; Benoît Magimel
- Cinematography: André Chemetoff
- Edited by: Simon Jacquet
- Music by: Sofiane Saïdi
- Production companies: Iconoclast Films; Chi-Fou-Mi (Note: co-productions: Studio Canal, France 2 Cinéma.))
- Distributed by: StudioCanal
- Release dates: 20 May 2023 (Cannes); 24 May 2023 (France)
- Running time: 92 minutes
- Country: France
- Languages: French, Arabic
- Budget: $5.490.000
- Box office: $2,199,216 (Note: as of 28 July 2023)

The King of Algiers (French: Omar la fraise, lit. 'Omar the Strawberry') is a 2023 French crime comedy film directed by Elias Belkeddar in his directorial debut, starring Reda Kateb and Benoît Magimel. The film premiered on 20 May 2023 at the 76th Cannes Film Festival. It was released in France on 24 May 2023.

== Synopsis ==
The story centers on Omar, also known as Omar la Fraise, a former gangster who finds himself on the run in Algiers after being sentenced to 20 years in prison by the French authorities. Omar settled in Algeria with his partner in crime, Roger. Transitioning away from their criminal activities, they attempt to lead a normal life.

== Cast ==
- Reda Kateb as Omar the Strawberry
- Benoît Magimel as Roger
- Meriem Amiar as Zohra / Samia

== Production ==
Written by the director and Jérôme Pierrat, produced by Iconoclast Films and Chi-Fou-Mi Productions (of the Mediawan Group), in co-production with France 2 Cinéma. StudioCanal distributed it.

== Release ==
The King of Algiers had its world premiere in a Midnight Screening within the Official Selection of the 2023 Cannes Film Festival on 20 May 2023. The film was theatrically released in France on 24 May 2023.

== Critical reception ==
On AlloCiné, the film holds an average Press rating of 3.4/5.
