= Benoît Magimel =

French actor (born 1974)

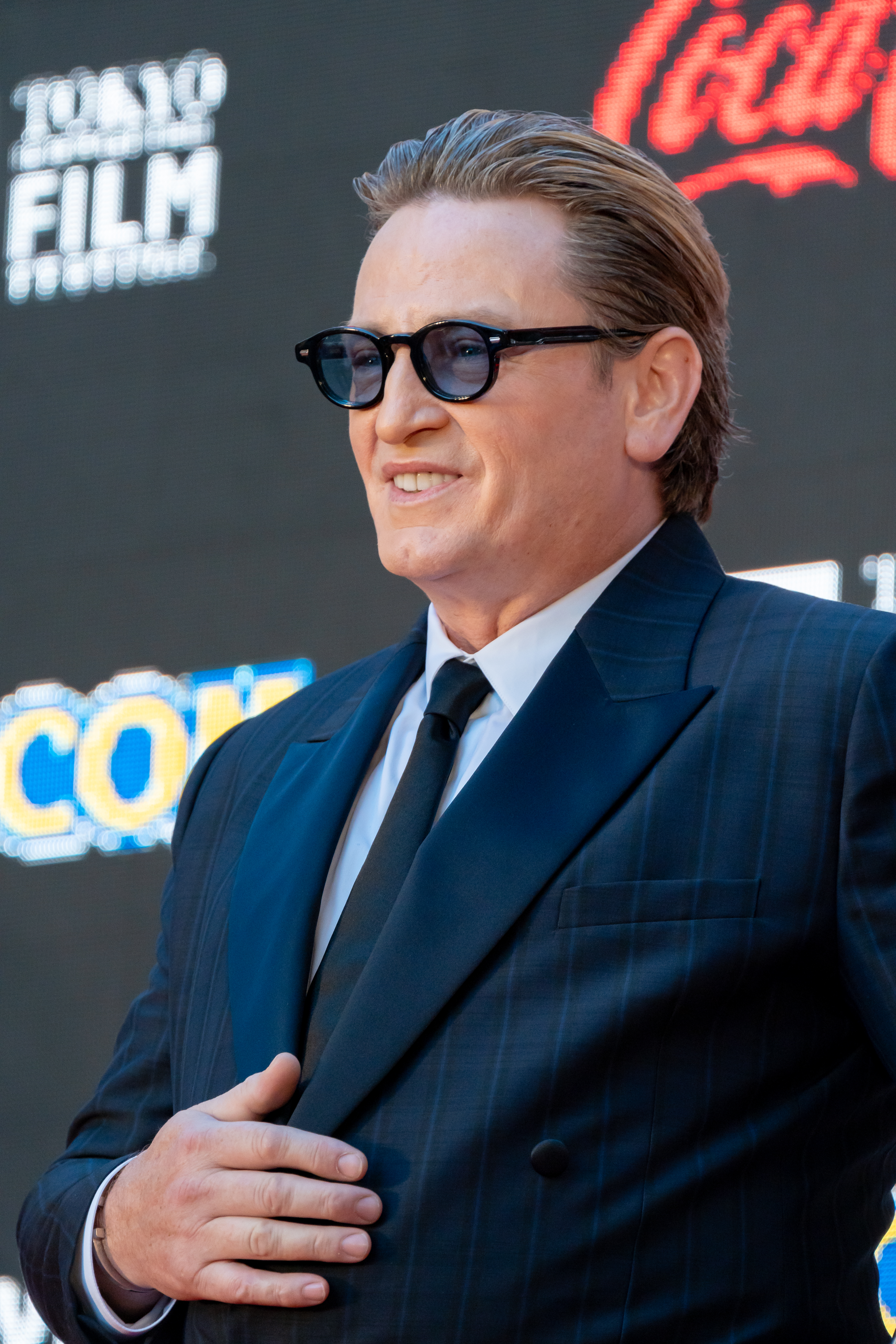
- Magimel in 2023
- Born: 11 May 1974 (age 52); Paris, France
- Occupation: Actor
- Years active: 1988–present
- Spouse: Margot Pelletier (m. 2018)
- Partner(s): Juliette Binoche (1998–2003); Nikita Lespinasse (2004–2014)
- Children: 2

Benoît Magimel (French: [bənwa maʒimɛl]; born 11 May 1974) is a French actor. He was 14 when he appeared in his first film, and has starred in a variety of roles in French cinema. At age 16, Magimel left school to pursue acting as a career. In 2001, he won the Best Actor award at the Cannes Film Festival for his role in Michael Haneke's The Piano Teacher. He also starred in Claude Chabrol's La Demoiselle d'honneur.

He won two consecutive César Awards for Best Actor for starring as an acting teacher diagnosed with late-stage cancer in Peaceful (2021) and the High Commissioner of French Polynesia De Roller in Pacifiction (2022).

Magimel was named Chevalier of the Ordre des Arts et des Lettres in 2006 and was promoted to the rank of Officier in 2013.

== Early life ==
Benoît Magimel was born in Paris on 11 May 1974. His mother was a nurse and his father worked in a bank. Through his maternal grandfather he is of Hungarian Jewish descent. He has a brother, Arnaud, and a sister, Bénédicte.

In 1988, he landed his first film role in Étienne Chatiliez's comedy Life Is a Long Quiet River, in which he played Maurice "Momo" Groseille. At sixteen, while in première (the second year of lycée), Magimel left school without a diploma to pursue acting as a career.

== Career ==
=== Breakthrough (1990s) ===
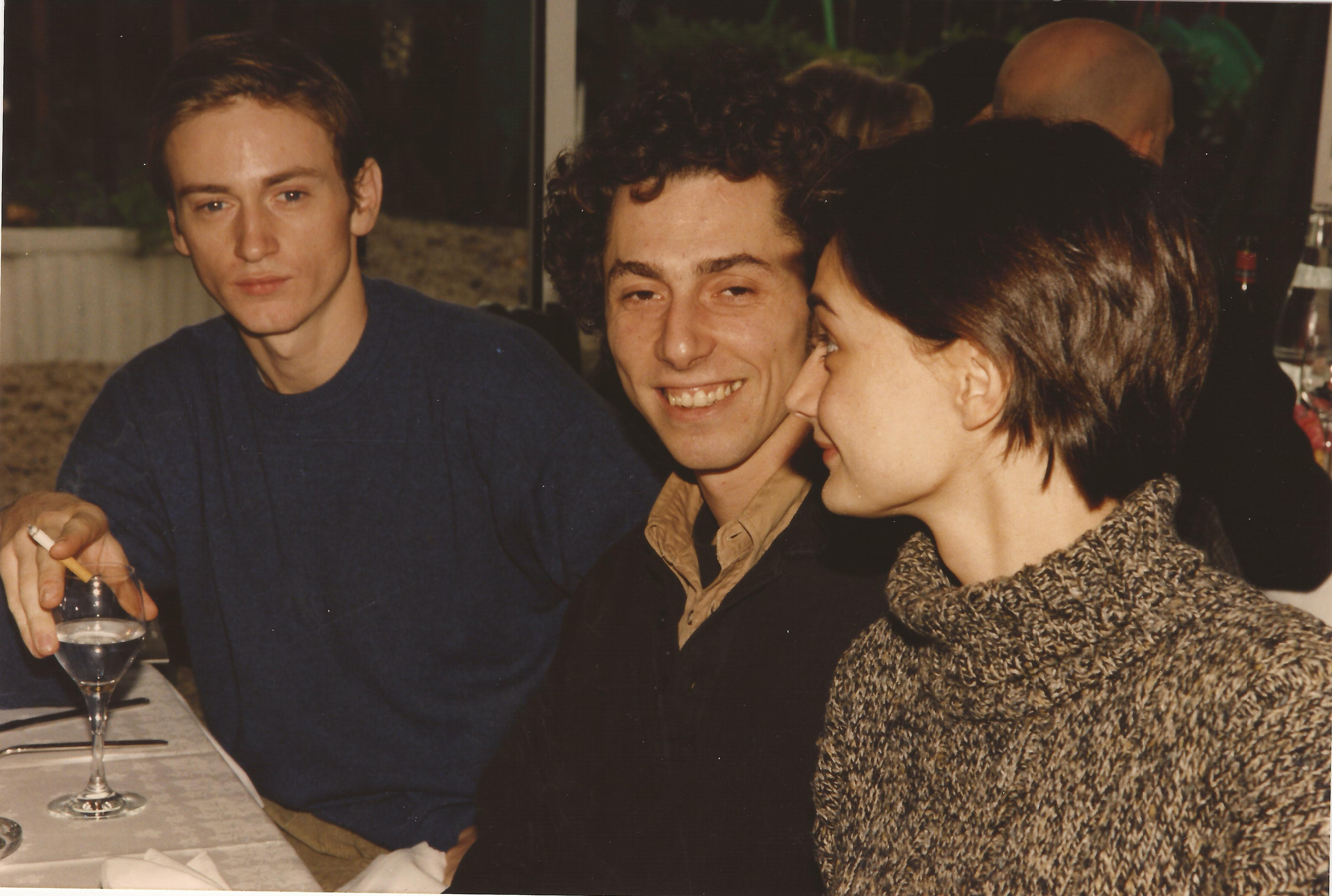
Magimel (left) with director Simon Lelouch (centre) in the early 90s, at the Aubagne Ciné Passion festival (short film section)

For his second film, the Christine Lipinska-directed comedy Papa est parti, maman aussi (1989), his name appeared at the top of the bill alongside Sophie Aubry and Jérôme Kircher.

He spent the decade accumulating roles, on television and in cinema, growing up in front of the camera, often under the direction of respected filmmakers.

In 1995, Magimel appeared as boyfriend Rémi in Benoît Jacquot's New Wave-style drama A Single Girl, which stars Virginie Ledoyen as a hotel waitress who discovers she is pregnant. That same year, Magimel made a brief appearance in Mathieu Kassovitz's black-and-white banlieue drama La Haine, which went on to become a cult film.

In 1996, Magimel took on a supporting role in André Téchiné's psychodrama Thieves, starring Catherine Deneuve, Daniel Auteuil and Laurence Côte. His performance garnered him a nomination for the César Award for Most Promising Actor in 1997.

He then achieved leading roles, often depicting rough and violent characters. In 1998, he shared the screen with Romain Duris and Zoé Félix for Olivier Dahan's crime drama Déjà mort. He also starred in the mining drama Une minute de silence, directed by Florent-Emilio Siri, who would become one of Magimel's most frequent collaborators.

In 1999, he shared the screen with Juliette Binoche in the romantic drama Children of the Century. Under the direction of Diane Kurys, he portrayed Alfred de Musset.

In 2000, he appeared in Xavier Beauvois's drama To Matthieu, in which he portrayed the lover of Claire, played by Nathalie Baye. Magimel surprised audiences with his performance as Louis XIV in the costume drama The King Is Dancing, directed by Gérard Corbiau.

The following decade allowed him to secure roles in more popular films.

=== Rise to prominence (2000s) ===
In 2001, he played a young protégé to a masochistic piano teacher who attempts to engage him in a sadomasochistic relationship, played by Isabelle Huppert, in the acclaimed drama The Piano Teacher, directed by Michael Haneke. He won the Best Actor award at the 2001 Cannes Film Festival for his performance. Then in 2002, he reunited with Florent-Emilio Siri for the action thriller The Nest.

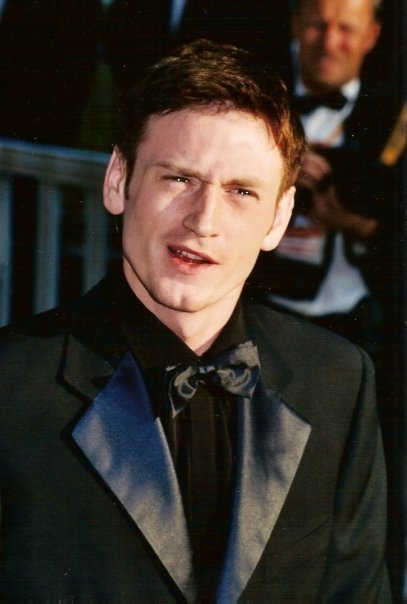
Magimel at the 2001 Cannes Film Festival, for the premiere of The Piano Teacher

In 2003, he shared the screen with Laetitia Casta for the drama Errance. He also accepted a supporting role under Jacques Villeret and André Dussollier in Jean Becker's drama Strange Gardens. He then portrayed a son alongside Nathalie Baye in Claude Chabrol's family drama The Flower of Evil.

He continued this momentum in 2004 with Olivier Dahan's police thriller Crimson Rivers II: Angels of the Apocalypse, in which he appeared opposite Jean Reno. He then appeared alongside Laura Smet in Claude Chabrol's psychological thriller The Bridesmaid.

He continued in 2005 with the thriller Trouble, starring Natacha Régnier. He then shared the screen with Clovis Cornillac for the blockbuster Sky Fighters. Around the same time, Magimel was also approached by Barbet Schroeder to portray French criminal Jacques Mesrine after Vincent Cassel withdrew from the role. Magimel refused the role because he felt his physique would be unsuitable to portray Mesrine. The project was later revived by Jean-François Richet, with Cassel returning, which produced the widely acclaimed Mesrine.

On 2 January 2006, Magimel was named Chevalier of the Ordre des Arts et des Lettres by Minister of Culture Renaud Donnedieu de Vabres. In 2006, he was part of the choral cast of Nicole Garcia's drama Charlie Says. He played an office employee in Lionel Bailliu's Fair Play, a psychological thriller about moral harassment in the workplace.

Magimel had four film releases in 2007. In January, he led the Parisian organized crime thriller Paris Lockdown, directed by Frédéric Schoendoerffer; in August, he co-starred with Ludivine Sagnier for A Girl Cut in Two, by Claude Chabrol; in October, he reunited with Florent-Emilio Siri for the Algerian War drama Intimate Enemies; and in December, he plays in the multi-narrative drama 24 Mesures, by Jalil Lespert.

In 2008, the novelist Michel Houellebecq directed Magimel in a film adaptation of one of his bestsellers, The Possibility of an Island. Magimel also traveled to Japan to star in Barbet Schroeder's mystery thriller Inju: The Beast in the Shadow, based on the novel by Edogawa Ranpo.

=== Established actor (2010s) ===
In 2010, he co-starred in the crime thriller Sans laisser de traces with François-Xavier Demaison and played the title lawyer in Cédric Anger's thriller L'Avocat. The year also marked his return to the comedy genre with two new films. He was cast in Guillaume Canet's hit comedy-drama film Little White Lies. He also shared the screen with Édouard Baer in Marc Esposito's Mon pote. The same year, he provided the voice for the Ken doll in the French dub of the Pixar animation film Toy Story 3.

In 2011, he starred under Diane Kruger in Afghanistan war adventure film Forces spéciales. He then reunited with Jalil Lespert for the intimate drama Headwinds, appearing opposite Isabelle Carré. Finally, he lends his voice to the video game Call of Duty: Modern Warfare 3.

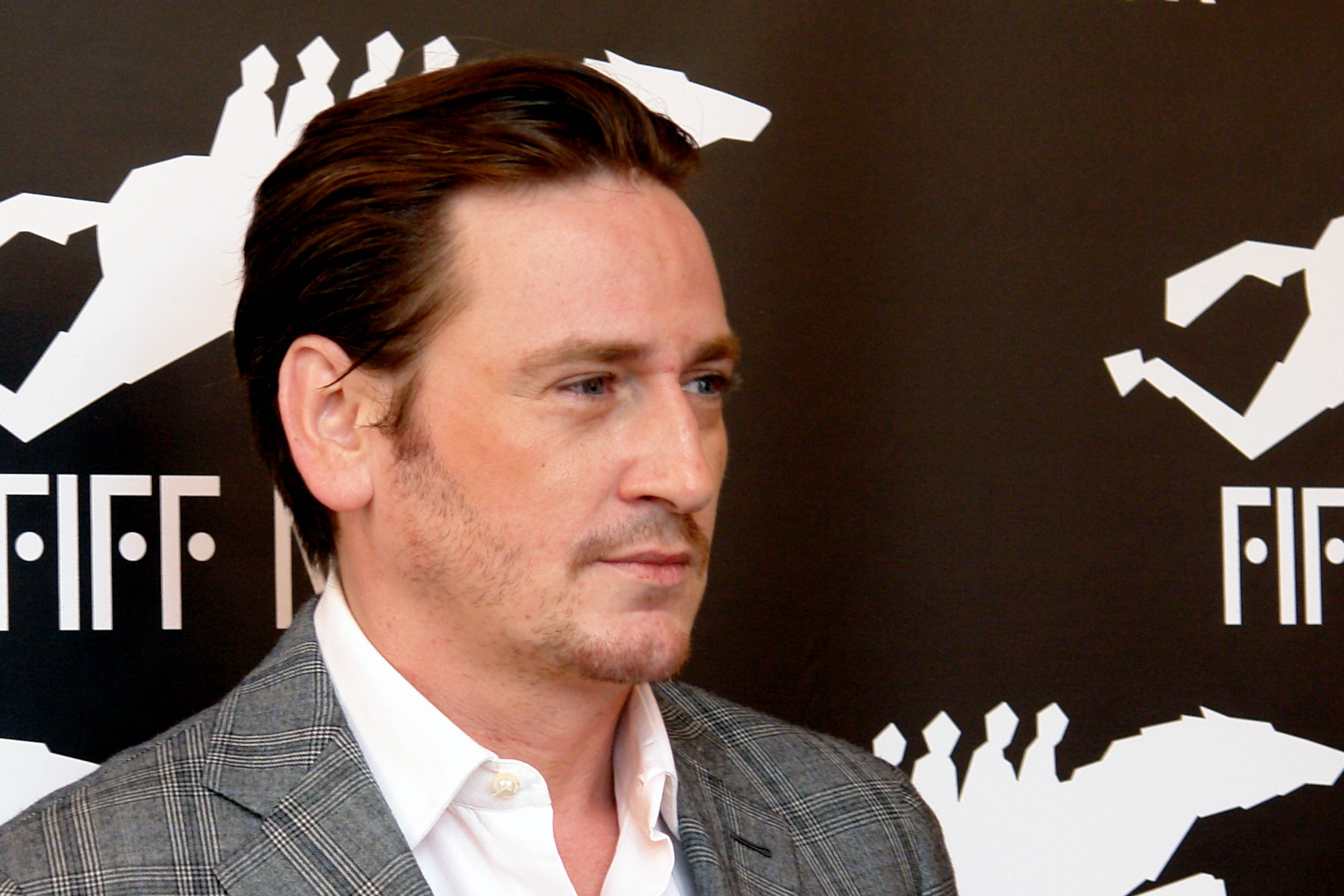
Magimel at the 2012 Festival International du Film Francophone de Namur, which held a retrospective in honor of his career

In 2012, audiences saw him collaborating once again with Florent-Emilio Siri for the biopic My Way, in which he portrayed the entertainment producer Paul Lederman. His performance was hailed and garnered him a nomination for the César Award for Best Supporting Actor in 2013.

In 2013, Diane Kurys cast him opposite Mélanie Thierry in the drama For a Woman. On 9 July 2013, Magimel was promoted to the rank of Officier of the Ordre des Arts et des Lettres by Minister of Culture Aurélie Filippetti. In 2014, he appeared in the action crime thriller The Connection, led by actor Jean Dujardin.

In 2015, he co-starred with Kad Merad and Charles Berling in the buddy comedy On voulait tout casser. The same year, he starred in Emmanuelle Bercot's coming-of-age drama Standing Tall. His performance as a counselor to a troubled teen was hailed and won him the César Award for Best Supporting Actor in 2016.

In 2016, Magimel was again directed by Emmanuelle Bercot in her medical drama 150 Milligrams, starring Sidse Babett Knudsen. He was also again directed by Frédéric Schoendoerffer in the action thriller Le Convoi. Magimel returned to television for the political drama series Marseille, developed by Florent-Emilio Siri for Netflix. He appeared alongside Gérard Depardieu and Géraldine Pailhas.

In 2017, he played a supporting role in the drama Memoir of War, carried by Mélanie Thierry. He then played the protagonist of the crime thriller Carbon, which marked his first collaboration with director Olivier Marchal.

Then in 2019, he became attached to Nous finirons ensemble, the sequel to the hit comedy-drama Little White Lies, again directed by Guillaume Canet. The series Marseille was not renewed for a third season, following poor reviews.

=== Continued acclaim (2020s) ===
In 2022, he received the César Award for Best Actor and Lumière Award for Best Actor for Peaceful (2021), directed by Emmanuelle Bercot, in which he starred opposite Catherine Deneuve in portraying an acting teacher diagnosed with late-stage cancer.

In 2022, he starred as the enigmatic High Commissioner of French Polynesia De Roller in Pacifiction, directed by Catalan auteur filmmaker Albert Serra. Set in Tahiti, the film explores De Roller's work and social engagements amid the surrounding political and colonial tensions of the island territory. The film is distinct for its lush widescreen panoramic shots of the Polynesian landscape and for its hypnotic atmosphere. With a nearly three-hour runtime, Pacifiction is a thriller that juxtaposes its "aesthetic sublime" with a "sense of paranoia and dread as its narrative is consistently thwarted in favour of modulated moods and atmospheres". The film premiered in competition at the 2022 Cannes Film Festival, and was awarded the Louis Delluc Prize. Magimel received widespread acclaim for his performance, for which he received both the César and Lumière awards for Best Actor. In doing so, Magimel became the first actor in the history of both the Lumière and César Awards to win Best Actor two years in a row.

In 2023, Magimel starred in three films presented at the 76th Cannes Film Festival: Stéphanie Di Giusto's Rosalie, a historical drama set in 1870s Brittany and starring Nadia Tereszkiewicz as a bearded lady; The King of Algiers, a comedy set in Algeria and starring Reda Kateb; and Tran Anh Hung's The Taste of Things, a historical drama starring that depicts a romance between a cook, played by Juliette Binoche, and the gourmet she works for.

In June 2024, Apple TV+ announced the six-part thriller series À l'ombre des forêts starring Magimel and Mélanie Laurent, created and directed by Cédric Anger.

== Personal life ==
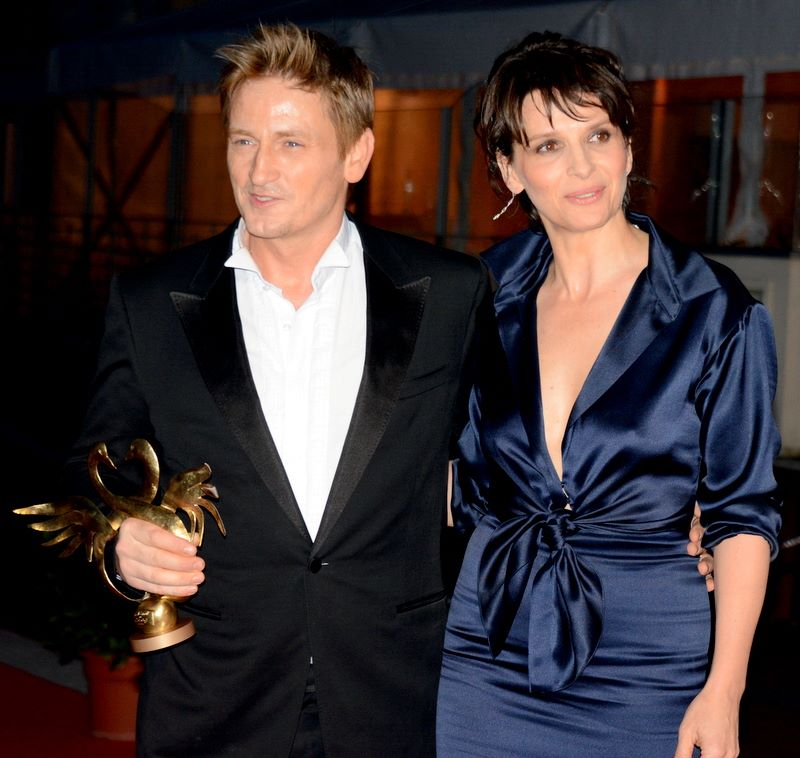
Magimel with his ex-partner Juliette Binoche at the 2015 Cabourg Film Festival

In 1998, Magimel began a relationship with Juliette Binoche, whom he met during the filming of Children of the Century. They have a daughter, Hana, who was born in 1999. They separated in 2003. In 2004, Magimel began a relationship with actress Nikita Lespinasse, whom he had met during the filming of Crimson Rivers II: Angels of the Apocalypse. Their daughter, Djinina, was born in 2011. Magimel and Lespinasse separated in 2014.

In February 2016, Magimel appeared at the César Awards ceremony alongside his partner Margot Pelletier. The couple were married on 10 November 2018, during a ceremony held at the town hall of the 16th arrondissement of Paris.

== Legal issues ==
On 11 March 2016, he was taken into police custody after hitting a 62-year-old woman in Paris, on the boulevard Exelmans while driving a rental car without a licence. He was charged with hit and run, unintentional injury, and driving despite cancellation of a driving licence. He was subject to drug testing, which revealed traces of cocaine in his system. The pedestrian, who suffered injuries to her legs, was hospitalised. In June 2017, he was sentenced on appeal to a fine of €5,000 for having hit the pedestrian and a €1,200 fine for driving under the influence of drugs.

On 18 September 2017, Magimel was again arrested in Paris in his car and in the company of another man while driving against traffic in a one-way street. Pouches of white powder containing heroin were found in his possession although he tested negative on a saliva test. He was sentenced to a three-month suspended prison sentence for possession of narcotics.

== Filmography ==
Key
†	Denotes films that have not yet been released

=== Film ===
Year	Title	Role	Notes
1988	Life Is a Long Quiet River	Momo Groseille	
1989	Papa est parti, maman aussi	Jérôme	
1992	Toutes peines confondues	Thomas	
1992	Les Années campagne	Jules	
1992	Le cahier volé	Maurice	
1995	La Haine	Benoît	
1995	A Single Girl	Rémi	
1996	Thieves	Jimmy Fontana	
1998	Déjà mort	David	
1998	Une minute de silence	Marek	
1999	Children of the Century	Alfred de Musset	
2000	Elle et lui au 14ème étage	Firmin	
2000	The King Is Dancing	Louis XIV	
2000	To Matthieu	Matthieu Debris	
2001	Lisa	Sam	
2001	The Piano Teacher	Walter Klemmer	
2002	The Nest	Santino	
2003	The Flower of Evil	François Vasseur	
2003	Strange Gardens	Emile Bailleul	
2003	Errance	Jacques	
2004	Crimson Rivers II: Angels of the Apocalypse	Capitaine Reda	
2004	The Bridesmaid	Philippe Tardieu	
2005	Trouble	Matyas / Thomas	
2005	Sky Fighters	Capitaine Antoine "Walk'n" Marchelli	
2006	Charlie Says	Pierre	
2006	Fair Play	Jean-Claude	
2007	Paris Lockdown	Franck	
2007	A Girl Cut in Two	Paul André Claude Gaudens	
2007	24 Mesures	Didier	
2007	Intimate Enemies	Lieutenant Terrien	
2008	2 Alone in Paris	Le commissaire	
2008	La Possibilité d'une île	Daniel	
2008	Inju: The Beast in the Shadow	Alex Fayard	
2010	Sans laisser de traces	Étienne Meunier	
2010	L'Avocat	Léo Demarsan	
2010	Little White Lies	Vincent Ribaud	
2010	Mon pote	Bruno Duchêne	
2011	Forces spéciales	Tic-Tac	
2011	Headwinds	Paul Anderen	
2012	My Way	Paul Lederman	
2013	For a Woman	Michel	
2014	The Connection	Le Fou	
2015	Standing Tall	Yann	
2015	On voulait tout casser	Gérôme	
2015	Cafard	Jean Mordant (Voice)	
2016	Le Convoi	Alex	
2016	150 Milligrams	Antoine Le Bihan	
2017	Money	Vincent	
2017	Memoir of War	Pierre Rabier	
2017	Carbon	Antoine Roca	
2019	Nous finirons ensemble	Vincent	
2019	An Easy Girl	Philippe	
2019	Lola	Philippe	
2020	Lovers	Léo Redler	
2021	Dune Dreams	Simon	
2021	Peaceful	Benjamin Boltanski	
2022	Incredible but True	Gérard	
2022	Paris Memories	Thomas	
2022	Pacifiction	De Roller	
2022	Jack Mimoun et les Secrets de Val Verde	Jonas Anatoli	
2022	Le Marchand de sable	Yvan	
2023	Rosalie	Abel Deluc	
2023	The King of Algiers	Roger	
2023	The Taste of Things	Dodin Bouffant	
2024	Ni chaînes ni maîtres	Eugène Larcenet	
2024	Saint-Ex	Le directeur de l'Aéropostale (voice)	
2026	Mi Amor	Vincent	
2026	The Birthday Party	Franck	
2026	De Gaulle: Résistance	Marie-Pierre Kœnig	
TBA	Banquise †		Post-production
TBA	The Enraged †		Post-production

=== Television ===
Year	Title	Role	Notes
1989	Pause café pause tendresse	Gérard Nyzeures	Episode: "Les verres cassés"
1990	Les Enfants de Lascaux	Georges	TV movie
1991	Faux frère		TV movie
1991	Les Ritals	Francois	TV movie
1991	Le Lyonnais	Robert Rodrigue	Episode: "Régis l'éventreur"
1993	L'Instit	Félix	Episode: "Les chiens et les loups"
1993	Le Voyant	Young man	Episode: "Pleine lune"
1994	Jalna	Eden	Miniseries; 8 episodes
1994	La Colline aux mille enfants	René	TV movie
1994	Tous les garçons et les filles de leur âge...	Pierre	TV movie: "L'Incruste"
1996	Long cours	Jeff	TV movie
1999	Bonne Nuit	Serge	TV movie
2008	Résolution 819	Jacques Calvez	TV movie
2016–2018	Marseille	Lucas Barrès	Main role; 16 episodes
2026	The Hunt	Franck	Miniseries; 6 episodes

=== Dubbing ===
- 2005: Hostage – Mars Krupcheck (Ben Foster)
- 2007: Alpha Dog – Jake Mazursky (Ben Foster)
- 2010: Toy Story 3 – Ken
- 2011: Call of Duty: Modern Warfare 3 – Yuri

== Honours and distinctions ==
- 2006: Chevalier of the Ordre des Arts et des Lettres
- 2013: Officier of the Ordre des Arts et des Lettres

== Awards and nominations ==
Award	Date of ceremony	Category	Recipient(s)	Result	Ref.
Les acteurs à l'Écran de Saint-Denis	30 March 1997	Prix Michel Simon	Thieves	Won	
Cabourg Film Festival	14 June 2015	Swann d'Or for Best Actor	Standing Tall	Won	
Cannes Film Festival	20 May 2001	Best Actor	The Piano Teacher	Won	
César Awards	8 February 1997	Most Promising Actor	Thieves	Nominated	
César Awards	22 February 2013	Best Supporting Actor	My Way	Nominated	
César Awards	26 February 2016	Best Supporting Actor	Standing Tall	Won	
César Awards	25 February 2022	Best Actor	Peaceful	Won	
César Awards	24 February 2023	Best Actor	Pacifiction	Won	
Lumière Awards	13 January 2008	Best Actor	A Girl Cut in Two	Nominated	
Lumière Awards	17 January 2022	Best Actor	Peaceful	Won	
Lumière Awards	16 January 2023	Best Actor	Pacifiction	Won	
