= Intimate Enemies (2007 film) =

- Film poster
- Directed by: Florent-Emilio Siri
- Written by: Florent-Emilio Siri; Patrick Rotman
- Produced by: François Kraus; Denis Pineau-Valencienne
- Starring: Benoît Magimel; Albert Dupontel
- Cinematography: Giovanni Fiore Coltellaci
- Edited by: Christophe Danilo; Olivier Gajan
- Music by: Alexandre Desplat
- Production company: Les Films du Kiosque
- Distributed by: SND
- Release dates: 7 September 2007 (TIFF); 3 October 2007 (France)
- Running time: 111 minutes
- Countries: France; Morocco
- Languages: French; Arabic; Kabyle
- Budget: $9.8 million
- Box office: $5.9 million

Intimate Enemies (French: L'Ennemi intime) is a 2007 French war film directed by Florent-Emilio Siri, starring Benoît Magimel and Albert Dupontel. It was filmed in France and Morocco.

== Plot ==
The film is set in 1959 during the Algerian War. Lieutenant Terrien (Benoît Magimel), an inexperienced and naïve junior French Army officer, has volunteered for active service, rather than a safe staff post in Algiers. He is posted to Kabylie, a remote and mountainous region of Algeria, as a replacement for Lieutenant Constantin (Hicham Hlimi) who was killed during a ‘friendly fire’ incident commanding a counter-insurgency ambush operation – i.e. he was accidentally killed by his own side during a confused fire-fight. The war in Algeria is much more complicated than Lieutenant Terrien anticipated as he takes over command of his new platoon at the outpost "Mazel". Within hours of taking over his new command Terrien is ordered to lead a ‘locate and destroy’ mission into the zone interdite (the 'Forbidden Zone') to find a World War II French Army veteran named Slimane, now a local commander of Algerian rebels trying to win the independence of their homeland. Slimane is never seen in person during the film.

When the Fellagha (Algerian insurgents) massacre the population of a local village in retaliation for a patrol visit from Terrien’s platoon, on the assumption that the villagers may have collaborated with the French, Terrien vows to remain calm and professional despite the appalling horrors that greet him. Terrien saves a young boy from drowning in the village well and is gradually forced to see the conflict through the eyes of that child: a child who temporarily adopts the French soldiers almost as a surrogate family. Terrien’s determination to remain detached, professional and controlled despite the atrocities that occur around him, including the torture, abuse and summary execution of Algerian prisoners, quickly gains him the initial contempt of Sergeant Dougnac (Albert Dupontel) his combat-hardened and cynical platoon sergeant, who has come to the conclusion that the level of violence employed by the Fellaghas can only be countered by equally brutal measures applied by the French.

The blooding of the young Lieutenant and the way in which he reacts to his newfound knowledge and experience provides the dramatic arc of L’Ennemi intime. Terrien’s idealistic view of French involvement in Algeria is summed up during a conversation with Captain Berthaut (Marc Barbé), an intelligence officer, when Terrien argues that as metropolitan French citizens the Algerians should enjoy the same political rights as any other French citizen and states that "You can’t fight barbarism with barbarism". Berthaut, identified as a former member of the French Resistance who was tortured by the Gestapo, a veteran of the French Indochina War and an old comrade-in-arms of Dougnac, disagrees and later in the film, states that, "At 110 volts the truth always comes out". Berthaut is killed and mutilated during a Fellaghist ambush as he attempts to evacuate a wounded soldier out of the ‘Forbidden Zone’ by jeep. Later, French soldiers (Terrien among them) retaliate by massacring and burning an entire village. In view of such atrocities, Terrien slowly begins to change his view.

Dougnac, identified within the film as a veteran of French Indochina, is a complicated character who is not averse to resorting to torture and barbarism when it comes to dealing with insurgents yet is capable, professional and increasingly privately respectful of Terrien as an officer and as a man. Their professional differences and the harsh realities of operations in the field, however, drive the two men to breaking point with Dougnac finding release through alcohol and at least one instance of self-inflicted torture. Such are the pressures on Dougnac that he finally snaps and deserts the army, whilst Terrien ends up shot by the boy he saved, whose brother was killed in a French military operation.

== Cast ==
- Benoît Magimel as Lieutenant Terrien
- Albert Dupontel as Sergeant Dougnac
- Aurélien Recoing as Commander Vesoul
- Marc Barbé as Captain Berthaut
- Éric Savin as A Sergeant
- Guillaume Gouix as Delmas
- Mohamed Fellag as Idir Danoun
- Vincent Rottiers as Lefranc
- Lounès Taizart as Saïd
- Abdelhafid Metalsi as Rachid
- Adrien Saint-José as Lacroix
- Ange Ruse as Théron
- Salim Aït-Ali Belkacem as Oumradam
- Antoine Laurent as Maheu
- Anthony Decady as Rougier
- Xavier Rothman as Bois
- Thimothée Manesse as Zunino
- Mohamed Madj as Mezaien of Taida
- Jérémy Arzencott as Toto
- Abdelkhalek Youness as Toutured Prisoner
- Hassib Boukelhall as Hassib
- Malik Bouarrar as Mahfoud
- Abdelhafid Danoun as Ali
- Gigi Terkemani as Zahra of Taida
- Amine Ennaji as fellagha battle Rezki
- Déborah Benzaquen as Earthling's Wife

== Production ==
L'Ennemi intime, co-written by Florent-Emilio Siri and Patrick Rotman, a French historian, documentary film-maker and screenwriter, is set during the French Algerian War and was inspired by Rotman's non-fiction book, La guerre sans nom (The Undeclared War) published in 1992, and subsequent French television documentary (L'Ennemi intime co-written with the director Bertrand Tavernier and originally broadcast in March 2002 by France3). The Rotman-Tavernier documentary focused on the psychological effects of the Algerian War of Independence (1954–62) on French soldiers who served in the conflict, the impact of French military tactics and extrajudicial actions and included on-camera interviews with French veterans speaking about their experiences of the so-called undeclared war.

== Reception ==
Review aggregation website Rotten Tomatoes reported an approval rating of 57%, based on 14 reviews, with an average score of 5.6/10. At Metacritic, which assigns a normalized rating out of 100 to reviews from mainstream critics, the film received an average score of 61, based on 6 reviews, indicating "generally favorable reviews".

== Accolades ==
Award / Film Festival	Category	Recipients and nominees	Result
Cairo International Film Festival	Golden Pyramid Award		Won
Cairo International Film Festival	Best Director	Florent-Emilio Siri	Won
Cairo International Film Festival	Best Actor	Albert Dupontel	Won
César Awards	Best Cinematography	Giovanni Fiore Coltellacci	Nominated
César Awards	Best Original Music	Alexandre Desplat	Nominated
César Awards	Best Sound	Antoine Deflandre, Germain Boulay and Eric Tisserand	Nominated
Prix Jacques Prévert du Scénario	Best Original Screenplay	Patrick Rotman and Florent-Emilio Siri	Nominated

== See also ==
- Lost Command
- The Battle of Algiers
