= Clément Sibony =

French actor (born 1976)

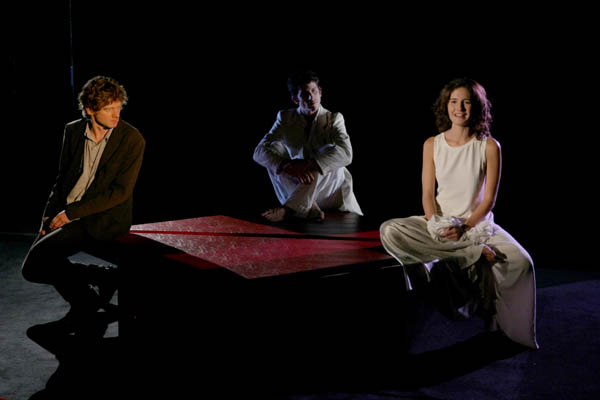
- Born: 30 November 1976 (age 49); Paris, France
- Occupations: Actor; film director
- Years active: 1991–present

Clément Sibony (born 30 November 1976) is a French actor and film director, who has appeared in more than 60 films and television shows since 1991. He won the award for Best Actor at the 22nd Moscow International Film Festival for his role in Taking Wing.

== Selected filmography ==
- French Kiss (1995)
- Déjà mort (1998)
- Cours Toujours (2000)
- Taking Wing (2000) - Stan
- He Loves Me... He Loves Me Not (2002)
- Avril (2006) - David
- Let My People Go! (2011)
- Voir la mer (2011) - Clément
- The Bird (2011)
- For a Woman (2013)
- Not to Be (2013) (short film, director)
- The Hundred-Foot Journey (2014)
- The Walk (2015) - Jean-Louis
- Altamira (2016)
