= Strange Gardens =

2003 film

- Directed by: Jean Becker
- Written by: Jean Cosmos; Guillaume Laurant; Jean Becker
- Produced by: Louis Becker
- Starring: Jacques Villeret; André Dussollier
- Cinematography: Jean-Marie Dreujou
- Edited by: Jacques Witta
- Music by: Zbigniew Preisner
- Distributed by: UGC Fox Distribution
- Release date: 26 March 2003
- Running time: 95 min
- Country: France
- Language: French

Strange Gardens (French: Effroyables Jardins) is a 2003 French drama film based on the eponymous novel by Michel Quint.

== Plot ==
In the 1950s, Jacques, a local school teacher goes back to the small province town where he used to live during the German Occupation of France, Douai. He goes there every year for the town fair, accompagnied by his wife (Louise) and two children (Françoise and Lucien), in order to perform a clown routine in front of the audience. On the way, they pick up Jacques' best friend, André, a local washed up castelain and an old lady, Marie. During the routine where the audience loves the performance, André notices that Lucien does not enjoy the situation at all and goes to inquire. The kid tells André that he feels ashamed of his father's actions and does not understand why he ridicules himself like that every year. André brings the kid outside and proceeds to tell him the story of why Jacques performs as a clown.

Back in Douai in 1944, during the latest stages of Second World War, Jacques and André were already great friends. Since the beginning of the occupation, they always avoided taking any action in the Resistance again the German out of fear. Things start to change as the D-Day Landing had just taken place and the General De Gaulle asks the people to take part in sabotage actions to help with the Allied advance through France. Jacques and André decide to blow up an interlocking tower at a train yard used to supply German reinforcements to the Normandy frontlines. Jacques distracts the German lookout and André blows up the tower using ordnance abandoned at his castle by fleeing French troops years earlier. Unbeknownst to the two friends, the tower was also occupied by the employee in charge of operating the track switches, a local named Félix, who is gravely wounded in the explosion.

Back at the café, they celebrate their action with Louise, the café owner whom Jacques and André have an attraction to. The German troops show up and round up Jacques and André to create a 4-person hostage group to be gunned down should the attack perpetrators fail to come forward within the day. With them are also captured Emile, a Resistant, and Thierry, a local insurance agent. The men are imprisoned by being thrown into an open air clay hole dug at a quarry. The German commander apologizes and insists he is only following orders by taking hostages. During their arrest, Jacques and André learn with sadness that Félix was present and hurt during their attack.

The situation of the hostages is desperate, even more so for Jacques and André who realize they will either be shot as the saboteurs if they confess or shot as hostages if they do not. Though they decide to confess to Emile and Thierry neither of them gives credit to their pleas as their reputation of cowardice makes it hard to believe.

The sentinel assigned to their surveillance is a fun-loving and kind German soldier named Bernd who starts distracting the hostages by performing a clown act. Bernd also reveals he used to be a circus artist from Medrano in Paris before being drafted in the Wehrmacht – the German army. Before leaving for the night, Bernd gives them his food rations as they are starving. The hostages realize that not all German soldiers are bloodthirsty killers, many are just human beings who were forced into the draft against their will. The next day, as the deadline is reached, Bernd stands up to his superior and refuses to take part in the firing squad. He is executed on the spot by his officer for insubordination much to the shock of the 4 men who sympathized with him over the course of their imprisonment and through discussions. His red clown nose falls into the clay pit at the feet of Jacques and the other hostages.

The hostages end up being freed at the last minute and they learn that they owe their life to Félix. The old man, on his deathbed, took the blame by pretending to be the saboteur and that he injured himself in the process, in order to save the 4 men. Jacques and André start leaving apart from the town, Thierry resumes his work and Emile, once their region has been reached by the Allies, enlists in the French army under Marshall De Lattre de Tassigny to keep freeing the country. At the Liberation Jacques and André come back to the quarry where they were held in order to put up a cross for Bernd. They also visit Félix's widow, who turns out to be Marie, to tell her the truth and thank her for Félix's sacrifice. She forgives them. During the armistice celebration, Jacques asks Louise to marry him after André withdrew himself from the love triangle.

Back in the present, Lucien now understands that his father performs the clown routine to honor the sacrifice of Bernd. He comes to realize that his father is far from being ridiculous and joins the audience, laughing at the jokes Jacques makes on stage.

== Cast ==
- Jacques Villeret - Jacques Pouzay
- André Dussollier - André Desingy
- Thierry Lhermitte - Thierry Plaisance
- Benoît Magimel - Émile Bailleul
- Suzanne Flon - Marie Gerbier
- Isabelle Candelier - Louise

== Production ==
The film was partially shot in the Occitania region, specifically in Saint-Denis-lès-Martel in the Lot department.
