= Peaceful (film) =

- Poster
- French: De son vivant
- Directed by: Emmanuelle Bercot
- Written by: Emmanuelle Bercot; Marcia Romano
- Produced by: François Kraus; Denis Pineau-Valencienne
- Starring: Catherine Deneuve; Benoît Magimel; Gabriel Sara; Cécile de France
- Cinematography: Yves Cape; Mathieu Caudroy
- Edited by: Yann Dedet; Julien Leloup
- Music by: Éric Neveux
- Production companies: Les Films du Kiosque; France 2 Cinéma; Scope Pictures; StudioCanal
- Distributed by: StudioCanal; O'Brother Distribution; Frenetic Films
- Release dates: 10 July 2021 (Cannes); 24 November 2021 (France)
- Running time: 120 minutes
- Country: France
- Language: French

Peaceful (French: De son vivant; lit. In His Lifetime) is a 2021 French drama film directed and co-written by Emmanuelle Bercot, starring Catherine Deneuve and Benoît Magimel.

The film had its premiere at the 2021 Cannes Film Festival. Portraying a man facing a serious illness and undeniable death, Benoît Magimel won the Award for Best Actor at the 27th Lumière Awards and 47th César Awards.

== Premise ==
Benjamin, a theatre professor, whose life expectancy is estimated to be a year after diagnosed with Stage IV cancer.

== Cast ==
- Benoît Magimel as Benjamin
- Catherine Deneuve as Crystal
- Cécile de France as Eugénie
- Gabriel Sara as Dr. Eddé
- Oscar Morgan as Léandre
- Lou Lampros as Lola
- Melissa George as Anna

== Production ==
Principal photography began on 11 October 2019. The filming was suspended on 25 November after Catherine Deneuve suffered a stroke. Deneuve returned to the film set in July 2020.

== Release ==
Peaceful had its world premiere at the 2021 Cannes Film Festival, screened out of competition. The film was released in France on 24 November 2021.

== Reception ==
On the review aggregator website Rotten Tomatoes, 27% of 11 critics' reviews are positive, with an average rating of 5.5/10. Metacritic, which uses a weighted average, assigned the film a score of 47 out of 100, based on six critics, indicating "mixed or average" reviews.

== Accolades ==
Award	Date	Category	Recipient	Result	Ref.
Lumière Awards	17 January 2022	Best Film	Emmanuelle Bercot, Denis Pineau-Valencienne, and François Kraus	Nominated	
Lumière Awards	17 January 2022	Best Actor	Benoît Magimel	Won	
César Awards	25 February 2022	Best Actor	Benoît Magimel	Won	
