= Carbon (2017 film) =

2017 film dir. Olivier Marchal

- Directed by: Olivier Marchal
- Starring: Benoît Magimel; Laura Smet
- Release date: 13 October 2017 (BIFF)
- Running time: 104 min
- Country: France
- Language: French

Carbon (French: Carbone) is a 2017 French crime film directed by Olivier Marchal.

== Plot ==
Antoine Roca is threatened with losing the family road transport business. After talking to his accountant and friend Laurent Melki, he came up with the idea of VAT fraud on carbon quotas in the European Union . For that, he contacts two acquaintances of poker evenings more accustomed to frauds, the brothers Éric and Simon Wizman as well as their mother, Dolly. To get started in their schemes, however, this small band needs funds. Since Antoine is toast in the Jewish community because of his wealthy stepfather, Aron Goldstein, they have to borrow from a figure of organized crime, Kamel Dafri.

== Cast ==
- Benoît Magimel - Antoine Roca
- Laura Smet - Noa Van Strecht
- Idir Chender - Éric Wizman
- Carole Brana - Dana Roca
- Gringe - Simon Wizman
- Michaël Youn - Laurent Melki
- Gérard Depardieu - Aron Goldstein

== Genesis and Development ==
The scenario is inspired by the VAT fraud on carbon quotas that allegedly took place between 2008 and 2009 3 . The screenwriter Emmanuel Naccache was initially also to be the director. Olivier Marchal was then to play the police officer Moser. The project did not materialize until a few years later, under the leadership of producer Manuel Munz.

=== Distribution of Roles ===
For this new film, Olivier Marchal has surrounded himself with several actors he has already met: Benoît Magimel who was his partner in Truands, Michaël Youn with whom he shares the poster of My beloved brother on France 2, Patrick Catalifo which he directed in Les Lyonnais et Borderline and Gérard Depardieu which he directed in 36 quai des Orfèvres. Gérard Depardieu and Benoît Magimel meet again, after having played together in the television series Marseille.
