= Zoé Félix =

French actress (born 1976)

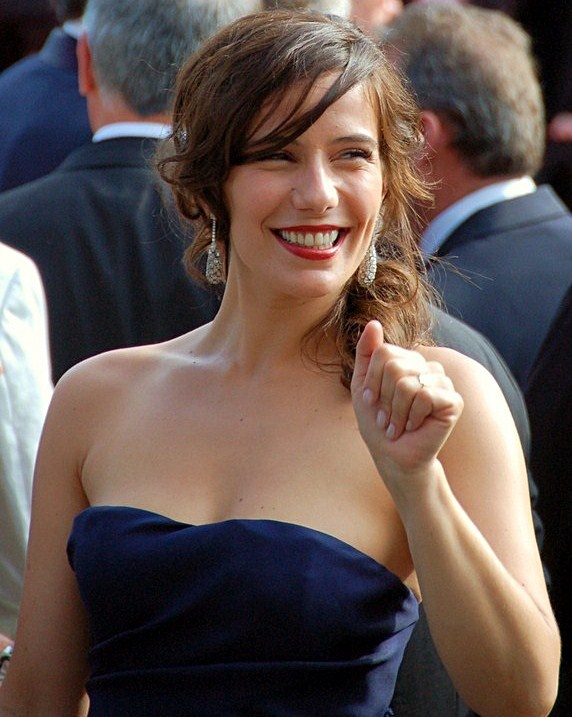
- Zoé Félix in 2008
- Born: 7 May 1976 (age 50); Paris, France
- Occupation: Actress

Zoé Félix (born 7 May 1976) is a French actress.

== Biography ==
=== Acting career ===
When Félix was seventeen, an agent saw her on a bus, gave her his card, and asked her to call him if she was ever interested in acting. Two years later, she contacted the agent to find small acting jobs to finance her studies at the Beaux-Arts, which she attended for two years.

==== Movie ====
In 1998, she got her first film acting experience in Olivier Dahan 's Déjà mort. She portrayed Carole in the French horror thriller Captifs. In 2008, she played Julie in the Dany Boon film Bienvenue chez les Ch'tis, an enormous success in France.

=== Personal life ===
Félix's mother works in public relations for the fashion industry, and her father organizes concerts. She is married to Benjamin, the director of a Parisian bar, Le Rosie.
