= My Way (2012 film) =

- Film poster
- Directed by: Florent-Emilio Siri
- Screenplay by: Julien Rappeneau
- Story by: Julian Rappeneau; Florent-Emilio Siri
- Produced by: Cyril Colbeau-Justin; Jean-Baptiste Dupon
- Starring: Jérémie Renier
- Cinematography: Giovanni Fiore Coltellacci
- Edited by: Olivier Gajan
- Music by: Alexandre Desplat
- Production companies: LGM Cinéma; StudioCanal; Flèche Productions; TF1 Films Production
- Distributed by: StudioCanal
- Release date: 14 March 2012 (France)
- Running time: 148 minutes
- Countries: France; Belgium
- Language: French
- Budget: $22.5 million
- Box office: $16.8 million

My Way, released in France as Cloclo, is a 2012 French biographical drama film about the life of French singer, songwriter and entertainer Claude François. It is co-written and directed by Florent-Emilio Siri, and stars Jérémie Renier as François.

Cloclo refers to François' nickname, while the international name was chosen due to the eponymous song popularized by Frank Sinatra, but originally co-written, co-composed and performed as "Comme d'habitude" by François. The film follows the life of the singer from his childhood in Egypt in the 1940s to his accidental death in 1978.

== Cast ==
- Jérémie Renier as Claude François
- Benoît Magimel as Paul Lederman
- Monica Scattini as Lucia "Souffa" François
- Sabrina Seyvecou as Josette "Jojo" François
- Ana Girardot as Isabelle Forêt
- Joséphine Japy as France Gall
- Maud Jurez as Janet Woollacot
- Marc Barbé as Aimé François
- Eric Savin as Jean-Jacques Tilche
- Émilie Caen as Geneviève Leroy
- Sophie Meister as Kathalyn Jones
- Janicke Askevold as Sofia
- Pascal Aubert as Eddy Marnay
- Robert Knepper as Frank Sinatra
- Alison Wheeler as Sylvie Mathurin

== Reception ==
The film received positive reviews from film critics, who praised Renier's performance and Siri's direction. It holds an 83% rating on the film critics aggregate site Rotten Tomatoes based on 6 reviews.

== Accolades ==
Organization	Award category	Recipients and nominees	Result
Cabourg Film Festival	Ciné Swan	Florent-Emilio Siri	Nominated
Cabourg Film Festival	Swan d'or du meilleur acteur (Best Actor)	Jérémie Renier	Won
César Awards	Best Actor	Jérémie Renier	Nominated
César Awards	Best Supporting Actor	Benoît Magimel	Nominated
César Awards	Best Costume Design	Mimi Lempicka	Nominated
César Awards	Best Art Direction	Philippe Chiffre	Nominated
César Awards	Best Sound	Antoine Deflandre, Germaine Boulay and Eric Tisserand	Won
Magritte Awards	Best Actor	Jérémie Renier	Nominated
COLCOA	Film d'ouverture (opening film)	Florent-Emilio Siri	Nominated
COLCOA	Prix spécial de la critic (Special Critics' Price)	Florent-Emilio Siri	Nominated
COLCOA	Mention spéciale du public (Special Public's Mention)	Florent-Emilio Siri	Nominated
COLCOA	Mention spécial (Special Mention)	Florent-Emilio Siri	Nominated
Rendez-Vous with French Cinema à Rome	Nouveautés (New)	Florent-Emilio Siri	Nominated
Hamburg Film Festival	Art Cinema Award	Florent-Emilio Siri	Nominated
