= A Girl Cut in Two =

2007 film by Claude Chabrol

- French theatrical release poster
- French: La Fille coupée en deux
- Directed by: Claude Chabrol
- Written by: Cécile Maistre; Claude Chabrol
- Produced by: Patrick Godeau
- Starring: Ludivine Sagnier; Benoît Magimel; François Berléand
- Cinematography: Eduardo Serra
- Edited by: Monique Fardoulis
- Music by: Matthieu Chabrol
- Production companies: Alicéléo Cinéma; Rhône-Alpes Cinéma; France 2 Cinéma; Integral Film
- Distributed by: Wild Bunch Distribution (France); Concorde Filmverleih (Germany)
- Release dates: 8 August 2007 (France); 10 January 2008 (Germany)
- Running time: 114 minutes
- Countries: France; Germany
- Language: French
- Budget: €6.7 million
- Box office: $8.5 million

A Girl Cut in Two (French: La Fille coupée en deux) is a 2007 black comedy film co-written and directed by Claude Chabrol, starring Ludivine Sagnier, Benoît Magimel and François Berléand. It tells the story of a naïve and affectionate girl who has disastrous relationships with two rich and influential men. One uses her as a sex object and abandons her, while the second marries her but proves lethally unbalanced. The film was released in France on 8 August 2007, and received a limited theatrical release in the United States on 15 August 2008.

== Music ==
Although the music was composed by the son of director Claude Chabrol, the work begins with an excerpt from the opera Turandot by Giacomo Puccini (1858-1924), “In questa reggia”.

== Plot ==
Gabrielle, a pretty but innocent young woman, lives with her mother in Lyon and works as a weather presenter for the local TV station. She attracts the attention of two very different men. One is Paul, the heir to a pharmaceutical fortune, who is too arrogant and immature to interest her seriously. The other is Charles, a nationally known writer more than twice her age whose wife stays in their country house while he uses a flat in town. There, he takes Gabrielle and teaches her the sexual arts, expanding them by visits to an exclusive sex club. Having enjoyed all her youthful passion, he disappears on an extended business trip. Gabrielle falls into a severe depression and her worried mother eventually lets Paul visit.

He takes Gabrielle for a holiday to Lisbon, in separate rooms, and there she agrees to marry him. His widowed mother is appalled and a pre-nuptial contract excludes Gabrielle from all the family wealth. Not wanting any future misunderstanding with the insecure and volatile Paul, on their honeymoon she tells him about the relationship with Charles. Back in Lyon, they attend a grand charity gala hosted by Paul's mother. The principal speaker is Charles and, in front of the town's élite, Paul shoots him dead. He gets a lenient sentence of seven years in an institution, from where he divorces Gabrielle, leaving her penniless.

Back home with her mother and seriously depressed, her uncle comes up with a solution. He tours with a cheesy magic show and Gabrielle in a sexy outfit becomes the girl who is cut in two by a circular saw. A close-up reveals that her emotional pain is unrelieved.

== Cast ==
- Ludivine Sagnier as Gabrielle Aurore Deneige
- Benoît Magimel as Paul André Claude Gaudens
- François Berléand as Charles Denis, known as Charles Saint-Denis
- Mathilda May as Capucine Jamet
- Caroline Silhol as Geneviève Gaudens, Paul's mother
- Marie Bunel as Marie Deneige, Gabrielle's mother
- Valeria Cavalli as Dona Saint-Denis, Charles' wife
- Étienne Chicot as Denis Deneige, Gabriella's uncle
- Édouard Baer as himself
- Jean-Marie Winling as Gérard Briançon
- Didier Bénureau as Philippe Le Riou
- Thomas Chabrol as Stéphane Lorbach, the Gaudens family's lawyer
- Charley Fouquet as Eléonore Gaudens
- Hubert Saint-Macary as Bernard Violet
- Clémence Bretécher as Joséphine Gaudens, Paul's sister
- Stéphane Debac as Antoine Volte
