= The Nest (2002 film) =

- Promotional poster for The Nest
- Directed by: Florent-Emilio Siri
- Written by: Florent-Emilio Siri; Jean-François Tarnowski
- Produced by: Claude Carrère; Guillaume Godard; Patrick Gouyou-Beauchamps
- Starring: Samy Naceri; Benoît Magimel
- Cinematography: Giovanni Fiore Coltellacci
- Edited by: Christophe Danilo; Olivier Gajan
- Music by: Alexandre Desplat
- Distributed by: Lions Gate Entertainment
- Release date: 6 March 2002
- Running time: 107 minutes
- Country: France
- Languages: French; English; German; Italian
- Box office: $1,941,471

The Nest (French: Nid de guêpes) is a 2002 French action thriller film, co-written and directed by Florent-Emilio Siri. The literal translation of the French title is Wasp's Nest. The film is quasi-remake of the 1976 film, Assault on Precinct 13, which in turn was inspired by 1959's Rio Bravo.

== Plot ==
During Bastille Day when most people are enjoying the French national holiday, a group of thieves prepare to commit a warehouse robbery at a massive industrial park. Meanwhile, Laborie, a special agent in the French special forces, is leading an international team that is escorting the captured leader of the Albanian mafia, Abedin Nexhep, who is due in court on charges of running an extensive European prostitution network. Despite the considerable security escort, Nexhep's henchmen still manage to set up an ambush.

Laborie manages to escape with Nexhep. They take refuge in the warehouse that is being robbed of computer equipment by the group of criminals. While facing off against the would-be thieves, the Albanian mafia surround the warehouse. Soon the three groups are involved in a long firefight with everyone involved struggling to survive.

== Cast ==
- Samy Naceri as Nasser
- Benoît Magimel as Santino
- Nadia Farès as Laborie
- Pascal Greggory as Louis
- Sami Bouajila as Selim
- Anisia Uzeyman as Nadia
- Richard Sammel as Winfried
- Valerio Mastandrea as Giovanni
- Martial Odone as Martial
- Martin Amic as Spitz
- Alexandre Hamidi as Tony
- Angelo Infanti as Abedin Nexhep

== Production ==
Nid de Guêpes combines a director's love of the Western, especially the old films such as the original Fort Apache, with modern European fears about transnational crime and the modern cinematic trope of the girl hero or female action hero.
