= Olivier Dahan =

French film director and screenwriter

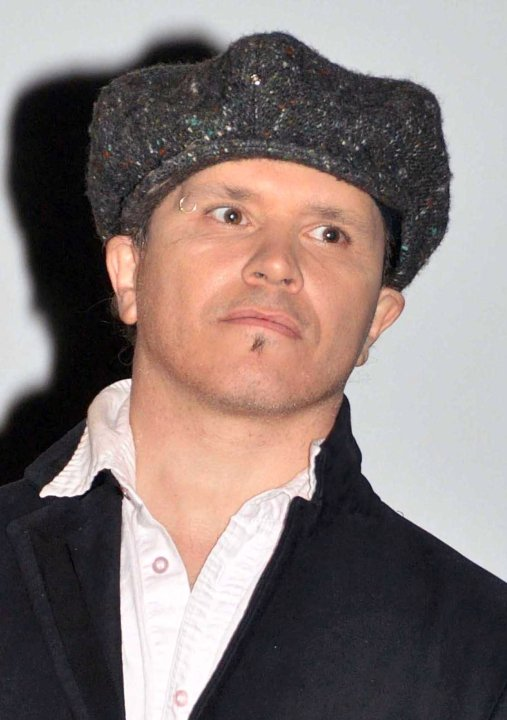
- Olivier Dahan in 2010
- Born: 26 June 1967 (age 58); La Ciotat, France
- Occupations: Film director, screenwriter
- Years active: 1994–present

Olivier Dahan (French: [ɔlivje daɑ̃]; born 26 June 1967) is a French film director and screenwriter. His third directed film, La Vie en Rose, was one of the only French cinema films to win two Academy Awards, including the first acting Oscar in the French language.

== Biography ==
Dahan was born in La Ciotat, France, to a father of Algerian-Jewish origin. In 1991, Olivier Dahan received a diploma in art at the Art school of Marseille, then shot several short subjects and clips.

In the beginning of 2004, he decided to shoot a film on the life of the French singer Édith Piaf. The film was a success and the actress Marion Cotillard won the Academy Award for Best Actress. Upon accepting the award, she credited Olivier Dahan for changing her life in whole and as an actress.

In the afterwards of the Academy Award ceremony, Olivier Dahan started to work on an English-language road movie named My Own Love Song released on April 7, 2010.

== Selected filmography ==
=== Feature films ===
- Frères (1994), starring Nabil El Bouhairi, Véronique Octon, Samy Naceri, & Romain Duris
- Déjà mort (1998), starring Romain Duris, Benoît Magimel and Zoé Félix
- Le Petit Poucet (2001), starring Élodie Bouchez, Romane Bohringer and Catherine Deneuve
- La Vie promise (2002), starring Isabelle Huppert and Pascal Greggory
- Crimson Rivers II: Angels of the Apocalypse (2004), starring Jean Reno, Benoît Magimel and Christopher Lee
- La Vie en Rose (2007), starring Marion Cotillard, Sylvie Testud and Clotilde Courau
- My Own Love Song (2010), starring Renée Zellweger, Forest Whitaker and Nick Nolte
- The Dream Team (2012) starring José García, Jean-Pierre Marielle, Gad Elmaleh, Joeystarr and Omar Sy
- Grace of Monaco (2014), starring Nicole Kidman, Tim Roth and Frank Langella
- Simone Veil, A Woman of the Century (2021) starring Elsa Zylberstein, Rebecca Marder and Olivier Gourmet

=== Musicals ===
- Mozart, l'opéra rock (2009)

== Awards and nominations ==
Nominations:

- BAFTA – Best Film Not in the English Language for La Vie en rose (shared with Alain Goldmen)
- Berlin International Film Festival – Golden Berlin Bear for La Vie en rose
- César Awards – Best Director, Best Film (shared with Alain Goldmen) and Best Original Writing for La Vie en rose
- European Film Awards – Best Film for La Vie en rose
- Globe de Cristal – Best Film for La Vie en rose
- San Sebastián International Film Festival – Golden Seashell for La Vie promise
- Satellite Awards – Best Director for La Vie en rose

Wins:

- Philadelphia Film Festival – Audience Award – Best Feature Film for La Vie en rose
- Torino International Festival of Young Cinema – FIPRESCI Prize, Special Mention for Tous les garçons et les filles de leur âge
