= He Loves Me... He Loves Me Not (film) =

2002 film by Laetitia Colombani

- Theatrical release poster
- French: À la folie... pas du tout
- Directed by: Laetitia Colombani
- Written by: Laetitia Colombani; Caroline Thivel
- Produced by: Charles Gassot
- Starring: Audrey Tautou; Samuel Le Bihan; Isabelle Carré; Sophie Guillemin; Clément Sibony
- Cinematography: Pierre Aïm
- Edited by: Véronique Parnet
- Music by: Jérôme Coullet
- Production companies: Téléma; TF1 Films Production
- Distributed by: UGC Fox Distribution
- Release date: 27 March 2002
- Running time: 96 minutes
- Country: France
- Language: French
- Budget: €6.2 million
- Box office: $5.3 million

He Loves Me... He Loves Me Not (French: À la folie... pas du tout) is a 2002 French romantic thriller film co-written and directed by Laetitia Colombani. The film focuses on a fine arts student, played by Audrey Tautou, and a married cardiologist, played by Samuel Le Bihan, with whom she is dangerously obsessed. The film studies the condition of erotomania and is both an example of the nonlinear and "unreliable narrator" forms of storytelling.

The title refers to the last two lines of the French game He loves me... he loves me not in which one pulls petals off a flower to determine whether the object of their affection returns that affection, and to what extent: un peu ("a little"), beaucoup ("a lot"); passionnément ("passionately"): à la folie ("to madness"); pas du tout ("not at all").

== Plot ==
Angélique (Audrey Tautou), a successful art student, purchases a single pink rose at a flower shop to be delivered to her lover, Dr. Loïc Le Garrec (Samuel Le Bihan). In between creating her art projects, Angélique works part-time at a cafe and house-sits for a wealthy vacationing family. Her friend David (Clément Sibony) disapproves of her affair with Loïc, who is married, but she insists that Loïc will leave his wife for her.

When Loïc's wife, Rachel (Isabelle Carré), has a miscarriage, the pair separate and Angélique prepares to leave with Loïc on a romantic getaway to Florence. However, Loïc does not meet Angélique at the airport, having chosen to mend things with his wife. This throws Angélique into a self-destructive cycle of clinical depression, losing her job and scholarship. While watching the news one night, she learns that Loïc has been arrested for assaulting one of his patients, Sonia Jasmin (Nathalie Krebs). She goes to Sonia's house to convince her to drop the charges and, in the ensuing scuffle, Sonia has a heart attack and dies. Thinking this will win Loïc back, Angélique steals from the house to make it look like a robbery. Instead, Loïc is arrested for Sonia's murder. Angélique, after witnessing Loïc embrace his wife as he is dragged away, returns home, turns on the gas oven, and lies down on the floor to commit suicide.

At this point the film rewinds to the opening scene when Angélique bought the pink rose. This time the film follows the delivery boy and the subsequent events play out from Loïc's viewpoint.

Loïc receives the pink rose and assumes that his wife sent it to him. It is revealed that Loïc barely knows Angélique and that they cross paths only because Angélique is house-sitting for Loïc and Rachel's neighbor. Loïc receives Angélique's gifts and messages but does not know who sent them. It is revealed that Rachel's miscarriage was caused by "someone" running her down with a moped; earlier in the film, Angélique is shown having suffered an "accident" that ruined her friend's moped and injured her arm. Loïc comes to believe that his stalker is Sonia; he physically attacks her and she presses charges for assault. After she dies of a heart attack, Loïc is arrested as the prime suspect for her murder. After his arrest, Rachel tells the police that he was with her on the night of the death, which clears him of all charges.

That night, Loïc sees an ambulance pull up to his neighbor's house after Angélique tries to kill herself. As a doctor, he performs mouth-to-mouth resuscitation, which causes her to regain consciousness. Now aware of her, he considers the possibility that she is his stalker. Exploring the house that she was house-sitting, he finds a life-sized garbage mosaic of himself. Loïc and Angélique have a final confrontation, in which he declares that they never had, nor ever will have, a relationship. Angélique strikes him over the head with a brass figurine and he falls down the stairs. Angélique is arrested, diagnosed with erotomania, and remanded to a mental institution. Rachel stands by her husband while he recovers from his injuries, and several years later the couple are shown at a house with their young children as Loïc hobbles around with a walker.

Five years after the attack, Angélique is released from the mental institution. Her therapist praises her progress and tells her, "If you keep taking your medication, you will be fine". However, when the cleaning man is clearing Angélique's room, he discovers her pills have been glued to the wall behind the wardrobe in a mosaic of Loïc, thus showing that Angélique has never taken her medication, and is still obsessed with Loïc. The film then ends with a quotation from a real erotomaniac: "Though my love is insane, my reason relieves the pain of the heart, telling me to be patient and not lose hope."

== Production ==
In a 2003 BBC interview, actress Audrey Tautou commented on working with director Laetitia Colombani: "I found her very precise. She knew exactly what she wanted. Even though she's very young, she managed to control the whole production. She knew her subject–this strange kind of madness–very well because she had studied it for a very long time."

== Music ==
The original soundtrack music composed by Jérôme Coullet for He Loves Me... He Loves Me Not was released on CD in 2013 by Canadian label Disques Cinemusique. More information here.

== Reception ==
=== Critical response ===
On the review aggregator website Rotten Tomatoes, the film holds an approval rating of 71% based on 73 reviews, with an average rating of 6.8/10. The website's critics consensus reads: "This romantic thriller puts Tautou's sweetheart Amelie image to good use." Metacritic, which uses a weighted average, assigned the film a score of 63 out of 100, based on 25 critics, indicating "generally favorable" reviews.

In the United States, Mick LaSalle of the San Francisco Chronicle noted it was the "first feature from 26-year-old Laetitia Colombani and represents about as assured a debut as they come. The first smart thing, of many, that Colombani does is cast Audrey Tautou in the lead role. Tautou has made several movies, but in America she is known for only one, Amélie, in which she played a wide-eyed innocent. Here she is just as wide-eyed, but if she's innocent it's only by reason of insanity. He Loves Me...He Loves Me Not has its own charms, but part of its wicked kick is that it's the anti-Amélie, presenting romantic fixation, not as noble and sweet, but objectively, as something selfish and volatile....[the film is] driven by a shrewd vision and, beneath its cool French surface, a well-placed sense of moral indignation. Tautou could not be better: She's infuriating — as well as emotionally present every moment onscreen." Richard Schickel called Colombani a "terrifically assured filmmaker" whose "twice-told tale" is the "basis for an intricately ironic, darkly witty movie with a twist ending that is both utterly surprising and utterly right"; in a comparison with Tautou's performance in Amélie, the film "displays a more dangerous kind of innocence with a charm that shades off into obsessive madness in very gentle, persuasive increments. Mostly, it's because this French film brings a cool, almost Pascalian logic to the messy topic of erotomania."

In the United Kingdom, Demetrios Matheou of The Independent called it "an assured, if slightly too obvious thriller by first-time director Laetitia Colombani"; the film's originality in its subject matter, called a "welcome change from the offensive 'woman scorned' scenario of so many Fatal Attraction's, is lost somewhat in her treatment – which gives first Angelique's perspective, before rewinding to show Loïc's. But a serious plus is Tautou, whose creepy, disturbing performance proves that the wide-eyed Amélie is a young actress with range." The Evening Standard called it an "irredeemably bad French film" with "characters [that] are cartoon representations of good and evil. By the time we work out what's really going on, it's too late: Angélique has earned our hatred and Loïc has shown himself too passive to hold our interest."

=== Box office ===
In France, the film sold 580,084 tickets.

The film, given a limited release to 23 North American movie theaters, grossed $1,011,102 during its theatrical run. The film was a modest success internationally grossing $101,483 in Austria, $13,306 in Czech Republic, $92,473 in Finland, $720,970 in Germany, $116,274 in Hong Kong, $60,825 in Hungary, $42,151 in Poland, $25,354 in Taiwan, and $140,124 in Turkey, for a worldwide total of $5,126,264.
