= UGC Fox Distribution =

French-American film production company

- Type: Joint venture
- Industry: Film
- Founded: July 1995; 31 years ago
- Defunct: November 2005; 21 years ago
- Fate: Dissolved
- Successor: 20th Century Fox; UGC
- Headquarters: Paris, France
- Owner: News Corporation; Union générale cinématographique
- Parent: Fox Entertainment Group; Union générale cinématographique

UGC Fox Distribution (UFD) was a French-American film production company formed in 1995 by joint venture between Union générale cinématographique (UGC) and 20th Century Fox (now known as 20th Century Studios) to produce and distribute films across France. Throughout its time, UFD has come to produce such successful films as Amélie. UFD also distributed many French-language 20th Century Fox films (along with subsidiaries; Fox Searchlight and New Regency), as well as films by MGM/UA.

In late 2005, UFD dissolved and was absorbed into the French division of Fox.

== Filmography ==
Release date	Title	Notes
11 December 1998	A Simple Plan	
3 March 1999	The Children of the Marshland	
31 March 1999	Girl on the Bridge	
25 April 2001	Amélie	
27 November 2002	If I Were a Rich Man	
26 March 2003	Strange Gardens	
8 December 2004	Les Dalton	
