= Florent-Emilio Siri =

French film director and screenwriter (born 1965)

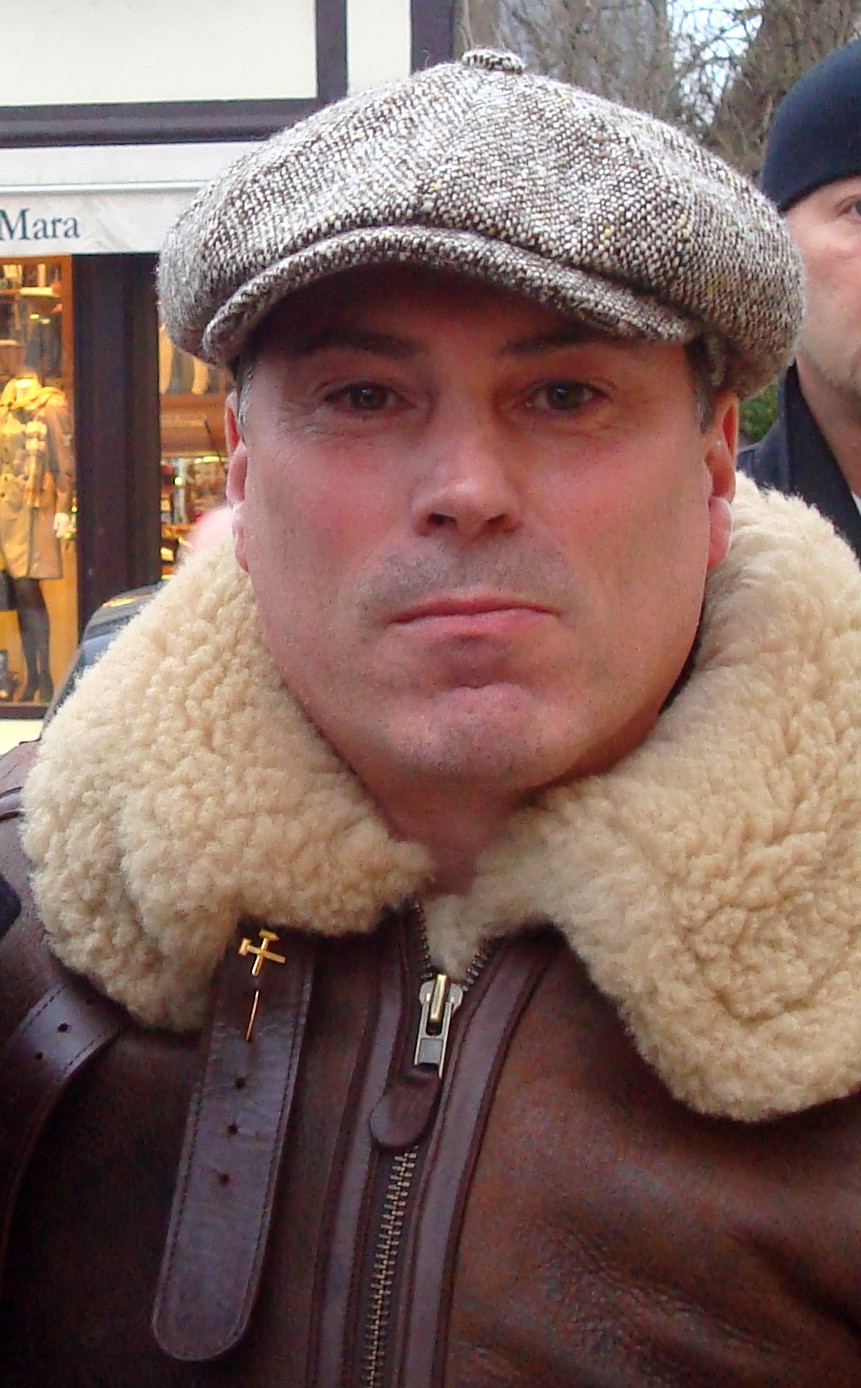
- Florent-Emilio Siri in 2010
- Born: 2 March 1965 (age 61); Saint-Avold, Lorraine, France
- Other name: Florent Siri
- Occupations: Film director, screenwriter
- Years active: 1998–present

Florent-Emilio Siri (born 2 March 1965) is a French film director and screenwriter born in Lorraine. Siri studied cinema at the Sorbonne University and ESRA in Paris. Siri is a music video director. He has worked with such bands as IAM, Alliance Ethnik, and Wu-Tang Clan, among others.

== Early life and career ==
Siri began his feature film career with the 1998 social film Une minute de silence ("one minute of silence") and continued in 2002 with the action film Nid de guêpes (The Nest). He went on to serve as director of the intro cinematic to two critically acclaimed and highly successful Splinter Cell games at French-based video game developer Ubisoft, titled Splinter Cell and Splinter Cell: Pandora Tomorrow.

Following the underground success of his first feature film, Siri's directorial style caught the eye of actor Bruce Willis, who asked Siri to direct his big-budget 2005 action thriller Hostage. While not a big commercial success, the film earned considerable critical praise of Siri's slick direction, calling it "an art house version of the Die Hard films."

In 2007, he released a film called L'Ennemi Intime ("Intimate Enemies") treating personal aspect and psychological effects on individual personalities of the Algerian War. It was the first film depicting the use of napalm by the French Army during the 1954-1962 conflict.

He wrote with Julien Rappeneau and made a film biopic titled My Way (Cloclo) about a French pop singer, songwriter and dancer Claude François, portrayed by Jérémie Renier. It was released in France in March 2012 and in November of the same year, he was named a Chevalier at the Ordre des Arts et des Lettres.

In 2015, he directed the comedy film French Cuisine. In 2016, he directed four episodes of the Netflix's TV series Marseille. He is also credited as showrunner.
