= Françoise Lebrun =

French actress

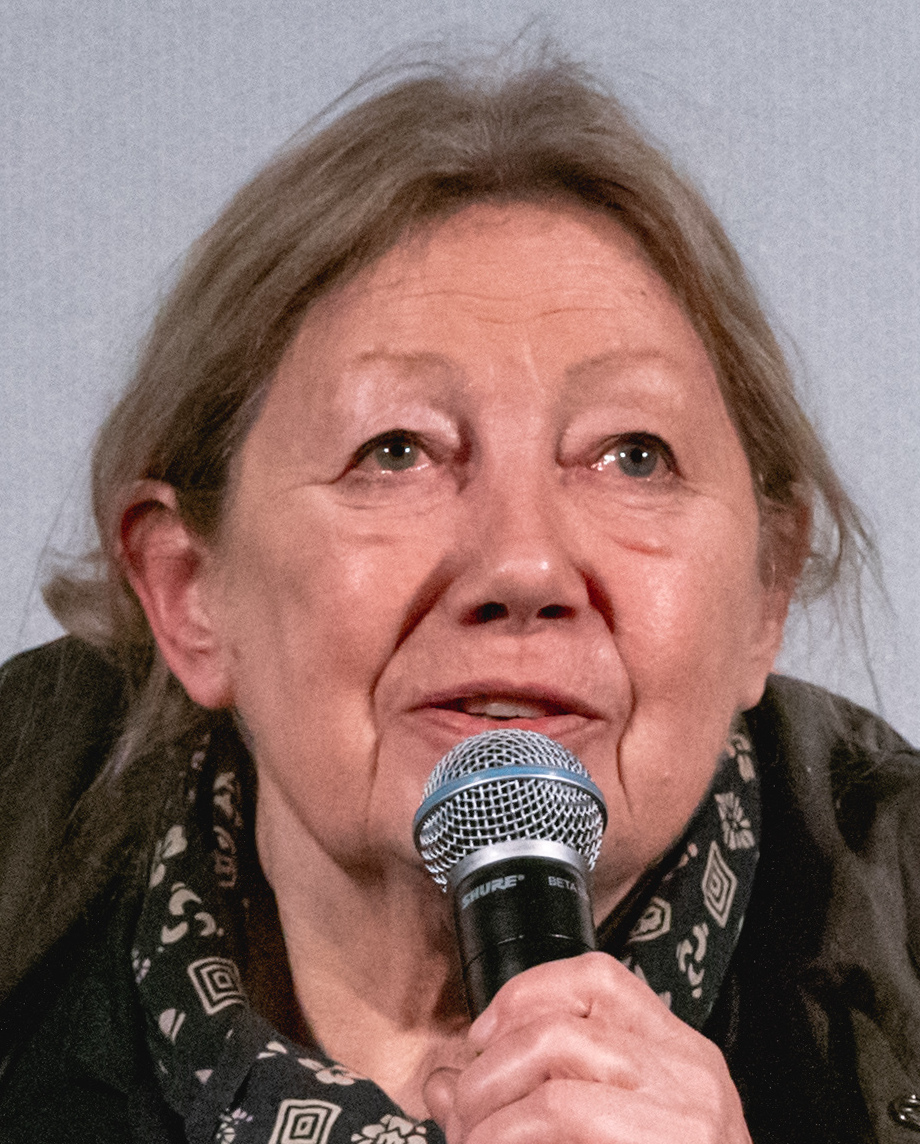
- Françoise Lebrun in 2022
- Born: 18 August 1944 (age 82)
- Occupations: Actress, Screenwriter, Film director, Producer
- Years active: 1971–present

Françoise Lebrun (born 18 August 1944) is a French actress.

== Career ==
She has appeared in many movies, and is especially known for her role as Veronika in Jean Eustache's The Mother and the Whore (1973).

She has worked with other directors including Paul Vecchiali, Marguerite Duras and Lucas Belvaux, and is the subject of the documentary Françoise Lebrun, les voies singulières (2008). In a Variety review of the Vecchiali film A Vot' Bon Coeur (2004), Lisa Nesselson called her "a supreme master of the sustained monologue."

== Personal life ==
Her daughter, Clara Le Picard, is a writer and stage director.

== Filmography ==
=== Cinema ===
Year	Title	Role	Director	Notes
1971	La ville-bidon	Lolotte	Jacques Baratier	
1972	Le château de Pointilly		Adolfo Arrieta	
1973	The Mother and the Whore	Veronika	Jean Eustache	
1974	Woman of Ganges	Voice	Marguerite Duras	
1975	India Song	The receptionist	Marguerite Duras	
1975	French Provincial	Young Augustine	André Téchiné	
1977	Ben et Bénédict	Ben / Bénédicte	Paula Delsol	
1977	Mon coeur est rouge	Clara	Michèle Rosier	
1977	Une sale histoire		Jean Eustache	Short
1978	En l'autre bord	The concierge	Jérôme Kanapa	
1980	Ma chérie	The doctor	Charlotte Dubreuil	
1981	L'homme fragile	Cécile Delvert	Claire Clouzot	
1982	Lointains boxeurs	The young woman	Claudine Bories	Short
1983	Archipel des amours		Jean-Claude Biette	
1983	At the Top of the Stairs	Michèle	Paul Vecchiali	
1985	Trous de mémoire	The woman	Paul Vecchiali	
1988	La police		Claire Simon	Short
1988	Le monologue de la femme rompue	Broken woman	Jacques Doazan	Short
1992	Fugue en sol mineur		Paul Vecchiali	Short
1995	Pullman paradis	Sophie Volland	Michèle Rosier	
1997	Pour rire!	The nurse	Lucas Belvaux	
1997	Une nouvelle douceur		Alejandra Rojo	Short
1998	On a très peu d'amis	Rose	Sylvain Monod	
2000	Un possible amour	Fabienne's mother	Christophe Lamotte	Short
2001	Electroménager	Psychiatrist	Sylvain Monod	
2001	Malraux, tu m'étonnes!	Yvonne de Gaulle	Michèle Rosier	
2004	Inguélézi	The mother	François Dupeyron	
2004	La question de l'étranger		Hubert Attal	Short
2005	À vot' bon coeur	Françoise	Paul Vecchiali	
2006	Et + si @ff	Germaine Sémouly	Paul Vecchiali	
2006	Fragments sur la grâce	A reader	Vincent Dieutre	
2006	Point de fuite		Nicolas Lasnibat	Short
2006	Voyage à Vézelay		Pierre Creton	Short
2007	The Key	Florence Arp	Guillaume Nicloux	
2007	Il sera une fois...	Mother Muche	Sandrine Veysset	
2007	...Et tremble d'être heureux	Hélène Abrège	Paul Vecchiali	
2007	The Diving Bell and the Butterfly	Madame Bauby	Julian Schnabel	
2008	Séraphine	Mother Superior	Martin Provost	
2008	Ea2		Vincent Dieutre	Short
2009	Julie & Julia	Baker's Mother	Nora Ephron	
2009	Ah! La libido	The elegant woman	Michèle Rosier	
2009	Tomorrow at Dawn	Claire Guibert	Denis Dercourt	
2009	Quelque chose à te dire	Jacques's mother	Cécile Telerman	
2009	La librairie de Schrödinger	The photographer	Christophe Beauvais & Claire Vassé	Short
2010	Holiday	Marie-Paule	Guillaume Nicloux	
2010	63 regards	Third woman	Christophe Pellet	Short
2011	ID A	Isabelle	Christian E. Christiansen	
2011	La liberté ou l'amour	The mother	Geoffroi Heissler	Short
2012	Dead Europe	Leah	Tony Krawitz	
2013	The Nun	Madame de Moni	Guillaume Nicloux	
2013	Le temps de l'aventure	Alix's mother	Jérôme Bonnell	
2013	La nuit		Adrien Dantou	Short
2013	Seul le feu	Françoise	Christophe Pellet	Short
2013	La trilogie française		Philippe Terrier-Hermann	Short
2013	À la claire fontaine	The voice	Jacques Richard	Short
2013	J'aurais voulu que tu sois là	The mother	Geoffroi Heissler	Short
2014	The Kidnapping of Michel Houellebecq	Françoise	Guillaume Nicloux	
2015	Fever	Sarah	Raphaël Neal	
2015	À 14 ans	Jade's grandmother	Hélène Zimmer	
2015	My Golden Days	Rose	Arnaud Desplechin	
2015	La fille et le fleuve	Mileva Marić	Aurélia Georges	
2015	Mémoires Sélectives	Alice	Pauline Étienne & Rafaella Houlstan-Hasaerts	Short
2015	Take Me to the Water	Her	Nelson Bourrec Carter	Short
2016	Le Cancre	Valentine	Paul Vecchiali	
2016	Looking for Her	Renée Lefèvre	Ounie Lecomte	
2016	The Girl Without Hands	The mother	Sébastien Laudenbach	
2017	Porto	Mother	Gabe Klinger	
2017	The Sower	Blanche	Marine Francen	
2017	Thirst Street	Landlady	Nathan Silver	
2017	Cinq nuits	Claude	Guillaume Orignac	Short
2017	Rappelle-moi	The mother	Marie-Hélène Copti	Short
2017	Sept mille années		Christophe Cognet	Short
2018	Ma vie avec James Dean	Géraud's mother	Dominique Choisy	
2018	Rages	The grandmother	Scott Noblet	Short
2018	Love u Hiroshima	Madame Pierrot	Jules-César Bréchet	Short
2018	Histoire de Stefano	The voice	Chiara Malta	Short
2019	Thalasso	Herself	Guillaume Nicloux	
2019	L'amour debout	Herself	Michaël Dacheux	
2019	Les grands squelettes		Philippe Ramos	
2020	Douze mille	Anouk	Nadège Trebal	
2020	Avant Tim	Denise	Alexis Diop	Short
2021	Vortex	The Mother	Gaspar Noé	
2022	Petite fleur	Agnès	Santiago Mitre	
2022	Le mur des morts	The grandmother	Eugène Green	Short
2022	Presque l'automne	Cécile	Margot Pouppeville	Short
2023	A Prince (Un prince)	The mother	Pierre Creton	
2023	The Book of Solutions	Denise Becker	Michel Gondry	
2024	Paternel	Rozenn	Ronan Tronchot	
2024	Filmlovers!		Arnaud Desplechin	
2024	Double foyer	Catherine	Claire Vassé	
2024	Rien ni personne	Monique	Gallien Guibert	
2024	Being Blanche Houellebecq	Françoise	Guillaume Nicloux	
2025	Father Mother Sister Brother	Madame Gautier	Jim Jarmusch	

=== Television ===
Year	Title	Role	Director	Notes
1978	Aurélien	Bérénice	Michel Favart	TV series (3 episodes)
1992	L'impure	Lady Witney	Paul Vecchiali	TV movie
2000	Mère en fuite	Lisbeth	Christophe Lamotte	TV movie
2001	Dérives	Marguerite	Christophe Lamotte	TV movie
2011	La fille de l'autre	Françoise	Harry Cleven	TV movie
2012	L'affaire Gordji, histoire d'une cohabitation		Guillaume Nicloux	TV movie
2018	Black Earth Rising	Madame Patenaude	Hugo Blick	TV series (2 episodes)
2019	La part du soupçon	Gladys Durieux Jelosse	Christophe Lamotte	TV movie
2019	Mythomaniac	The ghost	Fabrice Gobert	TV series (6 episodes)
2022	Un homme abîmé	Francine Sorrente	Philippe Triboit	TV movie

== Theater ==
Year	Title	Author	Director
1976	Le Défi	Jean-Claude Perrin	Jean-Claude Perrin & Maurice Bénichou
1978	Remagen	Anna Seghers	Jacques Lassalle
1978	Dissident, il va sans dire	Michel Vinaver	Jacques Lassalle
1983	Œil pour œil	Jacques Audiard & Louis-Charles Sirjacq	Louis-Charles Sirjacq
1994	Com’e adesso	Daniele Del Giudice	Jean Lacornerie
1995–96	Lulu	Frank Wedekind	Jean-Luc Lagarce
1999	La Fuite en Égypte	Bruno Bayen	Bruno Bayen
2003–2005	Life Is a Dream	Pedro Calderón de la Barca	Guillaume Delaveau
2004	Le Couloir	Philippe Minyana	Frédéric Maragnani
2007	Le Lien	Laurent Mauvignier	Laurence de La Fuente
2012	Le Peuple d’Icare	Dan Artus	Dan Artus
2015–2017	All Bovarys	Clara Le Picard	Clara Le Picard
2022	Cerveau	Clara Le Picard	Clara Le Picard

== Awards and nominations ==
Year	Award	Nominated work	Result
2023	Lumière Award for Best Actress	Vortex	Nominated
