= Aurélien Recoing =

French actor and stage director (born 1958)

- Born: 5 May 1958 (age 67); Paris, France
- Occupation(s): Actor, director
- Years active: 1976–present

Aurélien Recoing (born 5 May 1958) is a French actor and stage director.

== Personal life ==
Aurélien Recoing is the son of Alain Recoing (puppeteer), and the brother of Éloi Recoing (director and translator), Blaise Recoing (actor and musician), and David Recoing (pianist, composer).

Born in Paris on May 5, 1958, Aurélien Recoing began training to be an actor in 1974 at Cours Florent, and studied at Quartier d'Ivry. In 1977, the actor-in-training, who spoke fluent English and a little Russian, joined the Conservatoire national supérieur d'art dramatique in Paris, where he studied under Jean-Pierre Miquel and Antoine Vitez. He has appeared in more than 30 plays and has directed stage performances of works by Thomas Bernhard, Fernando Pessoa and Paul Claudel. He was awarded the Prix Gérard Philipe in 1989.

In 1980, Aurélien Recoing took his first steps into the world of cinema, in Exploits of a Young Don Juan. Finding art-house cinema appealing to him, he worked with Philippe Garrel on Emergency Kisses (Les baisers de secours), and with Laurence Ferreira Barbosa on Modern Life. The actor rose to fame in 2001 thanks to Laurent Cantet's Time Out (L'Emploi du Temps), in which he plays a man who invents a false life to avoid having to tell his friends and family that he has been fired from his job. As he became more and more in demand, he alternated between blockbusters such as Ruby & Quentin and That Woman and art-house films like L'Ennemi naturel and Orlando Vargas. Lending his talents to a number of unusual projects, in 2006 he portrayed a gamblers in 13 Tzameti, Géla Babluani's black-and-white thriller, and also appeared in Forgive Me (Pardonnez-moi), Maïwenn's home-movie style drama. In the same year, the physically imposing actor found himself transported back to 1914 France in Fragments of Antonin, and then to 1959 Kabylia in Florent Emilio Siri's Intimate Enemies. In 2008, he starred in Franck Llopis' Paris Nord-Sud and in La Saison des Orphelins. The following year, he was cast in Gilles Béhat's crime thriller Diamant 13 with Gérard Depardieu, and in Denis Dercourt's Tomorrow at Dawn (Demain dès l'aube).

He has made appearances in The Horde, directed by Yannick Dahan and Benjamin Rocher, Xavier de Choudens' Joseph and the Girl with Jacques Dutronc, and Léon Desclozeaux's Cargo, the Lost Men in 2010. He appeared in Frédéric Schoendoerffer's Switch, as well as in Olias Barco's Kill Me Please, which won the Marc'Aurelio d'Oro for best film at Rome Film Festival in 2010. He also appeared in Abdellatif Kechiche's Blue is the Warmest Colour, which took the Palme d'Or at Cannes. In 2020 he appeared in Adults in the room. An upcoming appearance is in Grand Ciel an Arte Film.

He made his first short film as a director The Rifleman (Un Bon Tireur) which won an Award Winner for Best Drama in 2021. He is developing his first feature film Naked Hands (À Mains Nues) with Sensito Films Productions.

== Theatre ==
Year	Title	Author	Director	Notes
1976	La Ballade de Mister Punch	Eloi Recoing	Antoine Vitez	Théâtre des Quartiers d'Ivry
1977	Hamlet	William Shakespeare	Daniel Mesguich	Maison de la culture de Grenoble
1978	Simplex ou la Peau de fou	Hansjörg Schneider	Guy Kagat	Théâtre 71
1980	La Malédiction	Aeschylus, Euripides & Sophocles	Jean-Pierre Miquel	Festival d'Avignon
1981	Faust	Johann Wolfgang von Goethe	Antoine Vitez (2)	Théâtre national de Chaillot
1981	Britannicus	Jean Racine	Antoine Vitez (3)	Théâtre national de Chaillot
1981	Caligula	Albert Camus	Patrick Guinand	Odéon-Théâtre de l'Europe
1981	Tombeau pour cinq cent mille soldats	Pierre Guyotat	Antoine Vitez (4)	Théâtre national de Chaillot
1982	The Prince of Homburg	Heinrich von Kleist	Patrick Guinand (2)	Odéon-Théâtre de l'Europe
1983	Hamlet	William Shakespeare	Antoine Vitez (5)	Théâtre national de Chaillot
1985	Hernani	Victor Hugo	Antoine Vitez (6)	Théâtre national de Chaillot
1986	Nicht Fisch nicht Fleisch	Franz Xaver Kroetz	Gilles Chavassieux	Les Ateliers
1987	The Satin Slipper	Paul Claudel	Antoine Vitez (7)	Théâtre national de Chaillot
1988	Tête d'or	Paul Claudel	Aurélien Recoing	Odéon-Théâtre de l'Europe
1989-90	Oedipus Rex	Sophocles	Jean-Pierre Vincent	Théâtre Nanterre-Amandiers
1989-90	Oedipus at Colonus	Sophocles	Jean-Pierre Vincent (2)	Théâtre Nanterre-Amandiers
1989-90	The Birds	Aristophanes	Jean-Pierre Vincent (3)	Théâtre Nanterre-Amandiers
1991	Summer and Smoke	Tennessee Williams	Gilles Gleizes	Théâtre de Rungis
1991-92	Le Vieil Hiver	Roger Planchon	Roger Planchon	Théâtre national de la Colline
1991-92	Fragile Forêt	Roger Planchon	Roger Planchon (2)	Théâtre national de la Colline
1993	Munich-Athènes	Lars Norén	Claudia Stavisky	Théâtre des Carmes
1993	Faust	Fernando Pessoa	Aurélien Recoing (2)	Théâtre de la commune Aubervilliers
1994	Entretiens	Thomas Bernhard & Krista Fleischman	Laurence Roy & Aurélien Recoing (3)	Festival d'Avignon
1995	Affabulazione	Pier Paolo Pasolini	Christophe Perton	Théâtre de Gennevilliers
1997	Nathan the Wise	Gotthold Ephraim Lessing	Denis Marleau	National Theatre of Strasbourg
1997	Poèmes	Antoine Vitez	Antoine Vitez (8)	Festival d'Avignon
2010-11	Andromaque	Jean Racine	Muriel Mayette	Roman Theatre of Orange
2011	Bérénice	Jean Racine	Muriel Mayette (2)	Comédie-Française
2011-12	The Little Prince	Antoine de Saint-Exupéry	Aurélien Recoing (4)	Studio-Théâtre
2014	People	Edward Bond	Alain Françon	Théâtre Gérard-Philippe

== Filmography ==
Year	Title	Role	Director	Notes
1982	Saint Louis ou La royauté bienfaisante	Alphonse	Jean-Claude Lubtchansky	TV movie
1987	Exploits of a Young Don Juan	Adolphe	Gianfranco Mingozzi	
1988	Les Tisserands du pouvoir	Jacques Roussel	Claude Fournier	TV mini-series
1989	Les Baisers de secours	The comedian	Philippe Garrel	
1989	Liberté, Libertés	Frétaux	Jean-Dominique de La Rochefoucauld	TV movie
1989	Le masque	Patrick Villedieu	Bruno Gantillon	TV series (1 episode)
1989	Les dossiers de l'écran	Henri de Guise	Yves-André Hubert	TV series (1 episode)
1990	Lacenaire	François	Francis Girod	
1990	Les enquêtes du commissaire Maigret	M. Gourion	Philippe Laïk	TV series (1 episode)
1991	La note bleue	Auguste Clésinger	Andrzej Zulawski	
1991	Absolution		Jean-Marie Cailleaux	Short
1993	Louis, the Child King	Jean François Paul de Gondi	Roger Planchon	
1993	La femme à abattre	Richard	Guy Pinon	
1993	Le bourgeois gentilhomme	Count Dorante	Yves-André Hubert (2)	TV movie
1994	Aux petits bonheurs		Michel Deville	
1994	Poubelles	The man	Olias Barco	Short
1994	Toilettes		Olias Barco (2)	Short
1995	La femme piégée	Jeff	Frédéric Compain	TV movie
1995	Les Cinq Dernières Minutes	Gérard Lelong	Jean-Marc Seban	TV series (1 episode)
1996	Passage à l'acte		Francis Girod (2)	
1996	Antoine	Gilles	Jérôme Foulon	TV movie
1996	Julie Lescaut	Marc Lefranc	Josée Dayan	TV series (1 episode)
1997	Le cri du silence	Marie's Husband	Jacques Malaterre	TV movie
1997	En danger de vie	Paul	Bruno Gantillon (2)	TV movie
1997	Rideau de feu	Arthur	Igaal Niddam	TV movie
1997	La vie à trois	Gilles Moutiers	Christiane Lehérissey	TV movie
1997	Nestor Burma	Vialar	Philippe Venault	TV series (1 episode)
1998	Tous ensemble	Gérard	Bertrand Arthuys	TV movie
1998	L'échappée	Charles	Roger Guillot	TV movie
1998	La kiné	Stopira	Aline Issermann	TV series (1 episode)
1999	La rivale	Sébastien	Alain Nahum	TV movie
1999	Margot des Clairies	Georges	Jean-Marc Seban (2)	TV movie
1999	Décollage immédiat	Roland Bartholdi	Aline Issermann (2)	TV mini-series
1999	Juliette Pomerleau		Claude Fournier (2)	TV series (1 episode)
2000	Modern Life	Georges	Laurence Ferreira Barbosa	
2000	Fidelity	Bernard	Andrzej Żuławski (2)	
2001	Time Out	Vincent	Laurent Cantet	Nominated - National Society of Film Critics Award for Best Actor; Nominated - Village Voice Film Poll - Best Actor
2001	Un jeu d'enfants	Inspector Mayens	Laurent Tuel	
2001	Un coeur oublié	Denis Diderot	Philippe Monnier	TV movie
2001	Les rencontres de Joëlle	Antoine	Patrick Poubel	TV movie
2002	Loup !	Ferdinand	Zoé Galeron	Short
2002	Premier cri	The man	Xavier Mussel	Short
2002	La boîte noire		Angelo Cianci	Short
2002	Garonne	Sylvain	Claude d'Anna	TV mini-series
2003	Ruby & Quentin	Rocco	Francis Veber	
2003	That Woman	The Identification Man	Guillaume Nicloux	
2003	Dans le rouge du couchant	The man with the knife	Edgardo Cozarinsky	
2003	Un fils	Max	Amal Bedjaoui	
2003	Pôv' fille	Paul	Jean-Luc Baraton & Patrick Maurin	Short
2003	Le pays des ours	Henri	Jean-Baptiste Léonetti	Short
2003	Un autre homme	André	Catherine Klein	Short
2003	Sergueï & Tatiana	Sergueï Komiakoff	Jean-Yves Guilleux	Short
2003	Mauvais jour	The man	Juan Carlos Medina	Short
2003	L'aubaine	Alex	Aline Issermann (3)	TV movie
2004	Souli	Yann	Alexander Abela	
2004	One Long Winter Without Fire	Jean	Greg Zglinski	
2004	L'ennemi naturel	Monsieur Tanguy	Pierre-Erwan Guillaume	
2004	Insurrection/résurrection	The psychiatrist	Pierre Méréjkowsky	
2004	Jour blanc	Graham	Germinal Alvarez	Short
2004	Claire l'obscure	The cellist	Joël Farges	Short
2004	Je m'indiffère	The Inspector	Alain Rudaz & Sébastien Spitz	Short
2004	Issa		Idir Serghine	Short
2004	Le pays des enfants perdus	Dolor	Francis Girod (3)	TV movie
2005	13 Tzameti	Jacky	Géla Babluani	
2005	Ghosts	Pierre	Christian Petzold	
2005	Cold Showers	Louis Steiner	Antony Cordier	
2005	Trois couples en quête d'orages	Rémi	Jacques Otmezguine	
2005	Orlando Vargas	Orlando Vargas	Juan Pittaluga	
2005	Naissance de l'orgueil		Antonio Hébrard	Short
2005	Le crime des renards	Baptiste	Serge Meynard	TV movie
2005	Nuit noire, 17 octobre 1961	Pierre Somveille	Alain Tasma	TV movie
2005	Blandine, l'insoumise	Abel Pagano	Claude d'Anna (2)	TV series (1 episode)
2006	Pardonnez-moi	Paul	Maïwenn	
2006	Un ami parfait	The doctor	Francis Girod (4)	
2006	Müetter	Mathieu	Dominique Lienhard	
2006	Les fragments d'Antonin	Professor Labrousse	Gabriel Le Bomin	
2006	La vie privée	Guillaume Vaudrey	Zina Modiano	
2006	Play the Game	Captain W.P. Nevill	Stéphane Barbato	Short
2006	Le secret	The father	Sébastien Fabioux	Short
2006	Sharpe's Challenge	Gudin	Tom Clegg	TV movie
2006	Sartre, l'âge des passions	Raymond Aron	Claude Goretta	TV movie
2007	Intimate Enemies	Commander Vesoul	Florent Emilio Siri	
2007	Contre-enquête	Stéphane Josse	Franck Mancuso	
2007	One	Lucas	Serge Mirzabekiantz	Short
2007	Un éclat	Pierre Lumens	Rodolphe Viémont	Short
2007	L'inconnu		Aurélien Vernhes-Lermusiaux	Short
2007	Notable donc coupable	Maurice Ballard	Dominique Baron & Francis Girod (5)	TV movie
2007	Opération Turquoise	Captain Cormery	Alain Tasma (2)	TV movie
2007	Ondes de choc	Rossi	Laurent Carcélès	TV mini-series
2007	Paris enquêtes criminelles	Father Roche	Gilles Béhat	TV series (1 episode)
2008	Il resto della notte	Giovanni Boarin	Francesco Munzi	
2008	La saison des orphelins	Achille	David Tardé	
2008	Paris Nord Sud	Justin	Franck Llopis	
2008	Troubles sens	Martin	Anna Condo	Short
2008	Béthune sur Nil	Daniel Vaillant	Jérôme Foulon (2)	TV movie
2008	Six angles vifs	Rossi	Laurent Carcélès (2)	TV mini-series
2009	Tomorrow at Dawn	Captain Déprées	Denis Dercourt	
2009	La Horde	Jimenez	Yannick Dahan & Benjamin Rocher	
2009	Diamant 13	Ladje	Gilles Béhat (2)	
2009	Magma	Commissioner Darcy	Pierre Vinour	
2009	Le repenti	Victor Fontanel	Olivier Guignard	TV movie
2010	Rebecca H. (Return to the Dogs)	Internet Stranger	Lodge Kerrigan	
2010	Kill Me Please	Doctor Krueger	Olias Barco (3)	
2010	Poursuite	Patrick	Marina Deak	
2010	Cargo, les hommes perdus.	Buck	Léon Desclozeaux	
2010	Joseph et la fille	Raphaël	Xavier De Choudens	
2010	L'étranger	M. Raymond	Franck Llopis (2)	
2010	Le pain du diable	Aimé Saillant	Bertrand Arthuys (2)	TV movie
2011	My Worst Nightmare	Thierry	Anne Fontaine	
2011	Switch	Delors	Frédéric Schoendoerffer	
2011	Équinoxe	Martin	Laurent Carcélès (3)	
2011	L'ombre d'un flic	Julien Ortéguy	David Delrieux	TV movie
2011	Faux coupable	Daniel Varini	Didier Le Pêcheur	TV movie
2012	Le grand bain	André	Tom Gargonne	Short
2012	Le grand Georges	Maurice Thorez	François Marthouret	TV movie
2012	Ça ne peut pas continuer comme ça !	Vincent / Nuissbaum	Dominique Cabrera	TV movie
2013	Blue Is the Warmest Colour	Adèle's father	Abdellatif Kechiche	
2013	Là-haut	Xavier	Bill Barluet	Short
2013	Le métis de Dieu	Pope John Paul II	Ilan Duran Cohen	TV movie
2014	La vie pure	Edgar Maufrais	Jeremy Banster	
2014	Mars	Steve Morton	Martin Douaire	Short
2014	Le criquet	Eric	Daisy Sadler	Short
2014	Marcel Dassault, l'homme au pardessus	Harry	Olivier Guignard (2)	TV movie
2014	Fleming: The Man Who Would Be Bond	François Darlan	Mat Whitecross	TV mini-series
2015	Despite the Night	Paul	Philippe Grandrieux	
2015	Des pierres en ce jardin	Pierre	Pascal Bonnelle	
2015	La clinique du docteur H	Doctor H	Olivier Barma	TV movie
2015	The Returned	Etienne Berg	Fabrice Gobert & Frédéric Goupil	TV series (5 episodes)
2016	Souffler plus fort que la mer	Loïc	Marine Place	
2016	Trepalium	Silas	Vincent Lannoo	TV mini-series
2023	The Plough	father	Philippe Garrel	
