= Éric Demarsan =

French composer (born 1938)

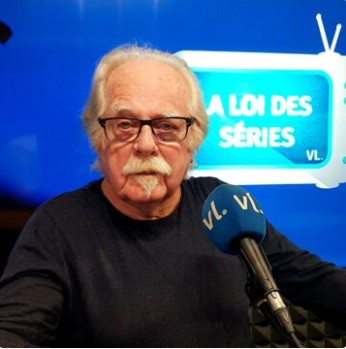
- Born: 2 October 1938 (age 87); Paris, France
- Other names: Éric de Marsan; Jason Havelock
- Occupation: Film score composer
- Website: http://www.demarsan.com/

Éric Demarsan (born 2 October 1938), also known as Éric de Marsanis, is a French film score composer.

== Life and career ==
After working as arranger for composers Michel Magne then François de Roubaix (including on Le Samouraï) he scored L'Armée des ombres (a.k.a. Army of Shadows) in 1969 then Le Cercle rouge (a.k.a. The red circle) in 1970, both by director Jean-Pierre Melville.

After that, he scored numerous movies for other great directors like Jean-Pierre Mocky, Costa-Gavras or Patrice Leconte.

Éric Demarsan also composed many songs, the Pop Symphony album under pseudonym Jason Havelock, as well as some musics for sound and light shows.

Since 2000 he works frequently with director Guillaume Nicloux and then Hervé Hadmar.

== Selected filmography ==
- 1968 : Sébastien parmi les hommes (TV), by Cécile Aubry
- 1969 : L'Armée des ombres, by Jean-Pierre Melville
- 1970 : Le Cercle rouge, by Jean-Pierre Melville
- 1971 : L'Humeur vagabonde, by Édouard Luntz
- 1974 : Section spéciale, by Costa-Gavras
- 1975 : La Rage au poing, by Eric Le Hung
- 1978 : Attention, Les Enfants Regardent, by Serge Leroy
- 1982 : L'Indiscrétion, by Pierre Lary
- 1983 : Un bon petit diable, by Jean-Claude Brialy
- 1983 : Le Bourreau des cœurs, by Christian Gion
- 1983 : Debout les crabes, la mer monte !, de Jean-Jacques Grand-Jouan
- 1985 : Les Spécialistes, by Patrice Leconte
- 1985 : Moi vouloir toi, by Patrick Dewolf
- 1988 : Juillet en septembre, by Sébastien Japrisot
- 1998 : Vidange, by Jean-Pierre Mocky
- 1993 : La Treizième voiture, by Alain Bonnot
- 2000 : La Candide madame Duff, by Jean-Pierre Mocky
- 2001 : La Bête de miséricorde, by Jean-Pierre Mocky
- 2002 : A Private Affair, by Guillaume Nicloux
- 2003 : That Woman, by Guillaume Nicloux
- 2006 : Le Concile de Pierre, by Guillaume Nicloux
- 2007 : Les Oubliées (TV), by Hervé Hadmar
- 2009 : Pigalle, la nuit (TV), by Hervé Hadmar
- 2010 : Signature (TV), by Hervé Hadmar
- 2012 : L'affaire Gordji (TV), by Guillaume Nicloux
- 2016 : The End, by Guillaume Nicloux
