= Gilles Cohen =

French actor (born 1963)

- Born: Gilles Victor Cohen; August 15, 1963 (age 62); Paris, France
- Occupations: Actor director

Gilles Cohen, born on August 15, 1963, in Paris, France, is a French actor with over 60 movie credits. Recognized for his versatility, he has taken on roles in a variety of genres, from drama to thrillers, in film, television and theater. He is known in particular for his roles in The Beat That My Heart Skipped (2005), A Prophet (2009), and the TV series The Bureau (2015).

== Early life ==
Cohen studied at Lycée Voltaire in Paris, where he developed an interest in theater. After obtaining his baccalaureate, he enrolled in the Cours Florent under the direction of Francis Huster.

== Career ==
Cohen began his acting career in theater, working both as an actor and a director. He made his film debut in 1985 and has since appeared in numerous French films and television series.

== Filmography ==
=== Cinema ===
==== Feature Films – Role ====
- 1978: La Clé sur la porte by Yves Boisset – A teenager
- 1985: Parking by Jacques Demy – The man at Bercy
- 1985: Three Men and a Cradle (Trois hommes et un couffin) by Coline Serreau – The second thug
- 1985: L'Affaire des divisions Morituri by F. J. Ossang – The Bentley driver
- 1989: Mama, There's a Man in Your Bed (Romuald et Juliette )by Coline Serreau – A driver
- 1992: Un vampire au paradis by Abdelkrim Bahloul
- 2001: Chaos by Coline Serreau – A doctor
- 2004: Kings and Queen (Rois et Reine) by Arnaud Desplechin – Simon, the cousin
- 2005: The Beat That My Heart Skipped (De battre mon cœur s'est arrêté) by Jacques Audiard – Sami
- 2005: Good Girl (Gentille) by Sophie Fillières – Hugues
- 2006: Les Ambitieux by Catherine Corsini – Simon
- 2006: L'École pour tous by Éric Rochant – Jean-Christophe Despalin
- 2007: Ma place au soleil by Éric de Montalier
- 2007: Actrices by Valeria Bruni Tedeschi – Jean-Luc
- 2007: Le Temps d'un regard by Ilan Flammer – The pharmacist
- 2007: The Key (La Clef) by Guillaume Nicloux – Larue
- 2008: Le Nouveau Protocole by Thomas Vincent – William
- 2008: The Girl from Monaco (La Fille de Monaco) by Anne Fontaine – Louis Lassalle
- 2009: La différence, c'est que c'est pas pareil by Pascal Laëthier – Georges
- 2009: Sweet Valentine by Emma Luchini – Aronne
- 2009: A Prophet (Un prophète) by Jacques Audiard – Prof
- 2009: Persécution by Patrice Chéreau – Michel
- 2010: Sans queue ni tête by Jeanne Labrune – The violent man
- 2010: Pauline et François by Renaud Fély – Serge
- 2011: Une pure affaire by Alexandre Coffre – The boss
- 2011: Légitime Défense by Pierre Lacan – Zamanski
- 2011: My Wife's Romance (Le Roman de ma femme) by Jamshed Usmonov – The policeman
- 2011: Les Yeux de sa mère by Thierry Klifa – Antoine
- 2011: Voir la mer by Patrice Leconte – Max
- 2011: Les Tribulations d'une caissière by Pierre Rambaldi – Fred
- 2013: It Boy (20 ans d'écart) by David Moreau – Vincent Kahn
- 2013: The Nun (La Religieuse) by Guillaume Nicloux – Suzanne's father
- 2013: Crawl by Hervé Lasgouttes – Jean
- 2014: Mea Culpa by Fred Cavayé – Pastor
- 2014: Brèves de comptoir by Jean-Michel Ribes – The anesthesiologist
- 2015: The Final Lesson (La Dernière Leçon) by Pascale Pouzadoux – Clovis
- 2015: Stop Me Here (Arrêtez-moi là) by Gilles Bannier – Maître Portal
- 2015: My Golden Days (Trois souvenirs de ma jeunesse) by Arnaud Desplechin – Elie
- 2016: Parenthèse by Bernard Tanguy – Delalande
- 2017: La Vie de château by Mody Barry and Cédric Ido – Dan
- 2018: Le Poulain by Mathieu Sapin – Pascal Prenois
- 2019: Serial (Bad) Weddings 2 (Qu'est-ce qu'on a encore fait au Bon Dieu?) by Philippe de Chauveron – Patrick
- 2019: Persona non grata by Roschdy Zem – Jérôme
- 2020: De Gaulle by Gabriel Le Bomin – Georges Mandel
- 2021: Comment je suis devenu super-héros by Douglas Attal – Commissioner Chairmont
- 2021: OSS 117: From Africa with Love (OSS 117: Alerte rouge en Afrique noire) by Nicolas Bedos – Roland Lépervier
- 2021: Lui by Guillaume Canet – The doctor
- 2022: The New Toy (Le Nouveau Jouet) by James Huth – Monsieur Pouzier
- 2023: Vaincre ou mourir by Paul Mignot and Vincent Mottez – Jean-Baptiste de Couëtus
- 2023: The Sitting Duck (La Syndicaliste by Jean-Paul Salomé – Hervé Temime
- 2024: Six Jours by Juan Carlos Medina

==== Short films ====
- 2005: Comme James Dean
- 2007: Un bébé tout neuf
- 2009: Cavalier seul

=== Television ===
- 2008: Vénus et Apollon (Season 2) by Pascal Lahmani – Chassard
- 2009: Des gens qui passent by Alain Nahum – Ansart
- 2010: Spiral (Engrenages Season 3) by Manuel Boursinhac – Martin Roban
- 2015–2020: The Bureau (Le Bureau des légendes – Seasons 1 to 5) by Éric Rochant – Marc Lauré, also known as "Moule à gaufres"
- 2016: Damoclès by Manuel Schapira – Richard
- 2017: Robin by Alice Douard – Lawrence
- 2018: Call My Agent! (Dix pour cent – Episode: Béatrice) – Pascal Birague
- 2018: Les Fantômes du Havre by Thierry Binisti – Commissioner Maxime Cartier
- 2019: Le Voyageur by Stéphanie Murat – Raphaël Cesnat
- 2019: Le Bazar de la Charité by Alexandre Laurent – Prefect Leblanc
- 2020: Paris-Brest by Philippe Lioret – Éric
- 2020: Si tu vois ma mère by Nathanaël Guedj – Philippe
- 2022: Oussekine by Antoine Chevrollier – Maître Garraud
- 2024: Mercato by David Hourrègue – Alain Cherki
- 2024: Cat's Eyes by Alexandre Laurent – Thomas Godard

=== Theater ===
- 1985: Le Cid by Corneille, directed by Francis Huster, Théâtre Renaud-Barrault
- 1989: Richard II (Richard Gloucester) by William Shakespeare, directed by Francis Huster, Théâtre Renaud-Barrault
- 1988: La Pièce de Chambertin and Un mouton à l'entresol by Eugène Labiche, directed by Gilles Cohen, Théâtre de la Tempête
- 1990: The Mystery of the Yellow Room (Le Mystère de la chambre jaune) by Gaston Leroux, adapted and directed by Gilles Cohen with Dominique Thomas, Théâtre de la Tempête
- 1992: Les Petits Marteaux, written and directed by Gilles Cohen, Théâtre de la Tempête
- 1994: Quisaitout et Grobêta by Coline Serreau, directed by Benno Besson, Théâtre de la Porte-Saint-Martin
- 2007: La Mémoire de l'eau by Shelach Stephenson, directed by Bernard Murat
- 2011: Mer by Tino Caspanello, directed by Jean-Louis Benoît, Théâtre de l'Atelier
- 2013: Hughie by Eugene O'Neill, directed by Jean-Yves Ruf, Espace des Arts (Chalon-sur-Saône), touring production
- 2014: Tartuffe (Le Tartuffe) by Molière, directed by Luc Bondy, Théâtre de l'Odéon
- 2016: Revenez demain by Blandine Costaz, directed by Laurent Fréchuret, touring production and Théâtre du Rond-Point
- 2019: Mon dîner avec Winston by Hervé Le Tellier, directed by Gilles Cohen, touring production
- 2020: Mon dîner avec Winston by Hervé Le Tellier, directed by Gilles Cohen, Théâtre du Rond-Point
- 2022: Mon dîner avec Winston by Hervé Le Tellier, directed by Gilles Cohen, Théâtre de l'Atelier
- 2025: Un château de cartes by Hadrien Raccah, directed by Serge Postigo, in touring

== Honors ==
- Officer of the Order of Arts and Letters (2021)

== Personal life ==
Gilles Cohen is married to Karine Paschal. He has two sons, Raphaël and Samuel Cohen from his previous marriage to actress Emmanuelle Devos.
