= Schoendoerffer =

Schoendoerffer is a surname. Notable people with the surname include:

- Frédéric Schoendoerffer, a French actor and writer
- Pierre Schoendoerffer, a French director, writer, war reporter, and First Indochina War veteran
