= Actrices =

- Film poster
- Directed by: Valeria Bruni Tedeschi
- Written by: Valeria Bruni Tedeschi; Noémie Lvovsky; Agnès de Sacy
- Produced by: Olivier Delbosc; Marc Missonnier
- Starring: Valeria Bruni Tedeschi; Noémie Lvovsky; Mathieu Amalric; Louis Garrel; Valeria Golino
- Cinematography: Jeanne Lapoirie
- Edited by: Valeria Bruni Tedeschi; Anne Weil
- Production companies: Canal+ CNC; Fidélité Productions; Virtual Films; Wild Bunch
- Distributed by: Wild Bunch
- Release dates: 19 May 2007 (Cannes); 26 December 2007 (France)
- Running time: 107 minutes
- Country: France
- Languages: French; Italian
- Budget: $3.5 million
- Box office: $4 million

Actrices (English: Actresses) is a French comedy-drama film directed by Valeria Bruni Tedeschi, released in 2007. The film was presented in the official selection at the 60th Cannes Film Festival and won a Prix Spécial du Jury in the Un Certain Regard section.

== Plot ==
Marcelline is a chagrined actress, haunted by Natalia Petrovna, the heroine of the Turgenev play A Month in the Country, that she is rehearsing. Trying to escape her fears she visits the swimming pool. While she is swimming she listens to Glenn Miller.

At the age of 40 she is unmarried and lives only for her work at the theatre. When she learns she will probably never have children, this heightens her anguish. She tries to communicate with those around her - living or dead: the Virgin Mary, the protecting ghost of her father seated on the family sofa, the mischievous phantom of her lover perched in a tree. She laughs and cries in turn, a nothing perturbs her, a look from her mother, or simply a kiss from the young lead in the play she is acting in.

== Cast ==
- Valeria Bruni Tedeschi as Marcelline
- Noémie Lvovsky as Nathalie
- Louis Garrel as Éric
- Mathieu Amalric as Denis
- Valeria Golino as Nathalia Petrovna
- Marisa Borini as The mother
- Maurice Garrel as The father
- Simona Marchini as The aunt
- Bernard Nissille as Jean-Paul
- Olivier Rabourdin as Marc
- Laetitia Spigarelli as Juliett
- Gilles Cohen as Jean-Luc
- Marie Rivière as The tailoress
- Eric Elmosnino as Raymond
- Robinson Stévenin as Julien
- Laurent Grévill as Arthur
- Pascal Bongard as The priest
