= Olivier Rabourdin =

French film actor (born 1959)

- Born: 3 March 1959 (age 67); Nanterre, France
- Occupation: Actor
- Years active: 1985–present

Olivier Rabourdin (born 3 March 1959) is a French film actor. He has appeared in more than seventy films since 1985. In 2010, he was nominated for a César Award in the category of Best Supporting Actor for the role of Christophe in the film Of Gods and Men.

== Filmography ==
=== Film ===
Year	Title	Role	Notes
1985	The Satin Slipper	A Fisherman	
1993	Les gens normaux n'ont rien d'exceptionnel		English: Normal People are Nothing Exceptional
1994	Lovers	Copain	
1995	L'ennemi	Higra	Short film; English: The Enemy
1997	Francorusse	Le forain	English: Francorussian
1998	Disparus	Roland	
1998	Commerce	Jacques	Short film
1999	The Messenger: The Story of Joan of Arc	Richemont	
2000	L'extraterrestre	Xab	English: The Extraterrestrial
2001	Un pied dans la tombe	Vincil	Short film; English: One Foot in the Grave
2003	Loulou	(voice)	Short film
2003	Un fils	Captain Lopez	English: A Son
2004	Kings and Queen	Jean-Jacques	French: Rois et reine
2004	Ma Mère	Robert	English: My Mother
2004	La blessure	Officer in white shirt at airport	English: The Injury
2004	Comme à la maison		Short film; English: Like at Home
2005	Sky Fighters	Général Président de la Commission	
2005	13 Tzameti	Benjamin Boudier	
2005	Pale Eyes	Néflier	
2006	La veille		Short film; English: The Day Before
2007	La clef	Tatoueur	English: The Key
2007	Actrices	Marc	English: Actresses
2007	La face cachée	Pierre	English: The Dark Side
2008	Taken	Jean-Claude	
2008	A Beautiful Voyage	Residence's director	
2009	Welcome	Lieutenant Caratini	
2009	Coeur animal	Paul	English: Animal Heart
2009	Notre ami Chopin	Charles	Short film; English: Our Friend Chopin
2010	Love Crime	The Judge	
2010	Of Gods and Men	Christophe	Nominated for a César Award
2010	My Father's Guests	Rémy	French: Les invités de mon père
2011	A Gang Story	Charles Bastiani	
2011	Midnight in Paris	Paul Gauguin	
2011	Nobody Else But You	Commandant Colbert	
2012	Journey of No Return	Inspector Manuel	
2012	Taken 2	Jean-Claude	
2012	Lost Paradise	Hugo	
2012	Augustine	Bourneville	
2012	On the Edge	L'homme	Short film
2013	Eastern Boys	Daniel	
2013	The Dream Kids	Christian, le père	
2013	Price Tag		Short film
2014	The Price of Fame	Dr. Sorlat	
2014	Nobody from Nowhere	Pierre Chambard	
2014	Grace of Monaco	Émile Pelletier	
2014	De guerre lasse	Marchiani	English: War Weary
2014	Milk	Edouard	Short film
2014	Duo	The Father	Short film
2015	My Golden Years	Abel Dédalus, le père	
2015	Gaz de France	Michel Battement	
2016	Chocolat	Firmin Gemier	
2016	Wùlu	Jean-François	
2016	La nuit rebelle	Chef de la Police (voice, uncredited)	English: The Rebellious Night
2017	Burn Out	Miguel	
2017	Le goût du calou		Short film; English: The Taste of Calou
2017	Money	Charles	
2017	The Order of Things	Gerard	
2017	The Guardians	Clovis	French: Les gardiennes
2017	Diane Has the Right Shape	L'hypnothérapeute	
2017	Pour la galerie	Jean-Marc Lerouzic	Short film; English: For the Gallery
2018	The White Crow	Alexinsky	
2018	Mort aux codes	Yves	Short film; English: Death to Codes
2018	Claire Darling	Claude Darling	French: La Dernière Folie de Claire Darling
2018	Corée, mon amour	Hugo	Short film; English: Korea, My Love
2019	Jungle Jihad	Le directeur de la DCRI	
2019	Effetto Domino	Jean Darnac	English: Domino Effect
2019	The Atomic Adventure	Le capitaine	Short film
2021	Black Box	Victor Pollock	French: Boîte noire
2021	Benedetta	Alfonso Cecchi	
2021	L'amour c'est mieux que la vie	Olivier	English: Love is Better than Life
2022	Le Sixième Enfant	Martin	English: The Sixth Child
2022	The Calling	Marc	Short film
2022	The Colors of Fire	Le commissaire	French: Couleurs de l'incendie
2023	Passages	Agathe's Father	
2023	L'autre Laurens	Gabriel Laurens/François Laurens	English: The Other Laurens
2023	Last Summer	Pierre	French: L'Été dernier
2024	Auction	Hervé Quinn	
TBA	Jíkuri	Psiquiatra	
TBA	Fox Hunt		Post-production
TBA	Maoussi	The Veterinary	Post-production
2026	Maigret and the Dead Lover	The Judge	

=== Television ===
Year	Title	Role	Notes
1991	The Hitchhiker	Denis LeBreaux	Episode: "A Whole New You"
1994	Police Secrets		Episode: "Mort d'un gardien de la paix" ("Death of a Peacekeeper")
1995	Le fils de Paul	Le sous-officer	TV film; English Paul's Son
1995	Le dernier voyage	Bernard	TV film; English The Last Journey
1996	La poupée qui tue	Un homme/Man 2	TV film; English: The Doll that Kills
1997	L'histoire du samedi	Martin Duchernoy	English: Saturday's Story; Episode: "La sauvageonne" ("The Wild One")
1997	En danger de vie		TV film; English: In Danger of Life
1998	Nestor Burma	The Mobster	Episode: "Poupée russe" ("Russian Doll")
1998	Une grosse bouchée d'amour	Médecin	TV film; English: A Big Mouthful of Love
2001	Crimes en série	Casini	English: Serial Crimes; Episode: "Le Disciple" ("The Disciple")
2002	Avocats & associés	Jean Vermeuil	English: Lawyers & Associates; Episode: "Parents indignes" ("Unworthy Parents")
2002	Quelle aventure!	Rollon/Le maître architecte	English: What an Adventure!; 2 episodes
2003	P.J.	Letouc	Episode: "Faux Semblants" ("False Pretenses")
2005	Les enquêtes d'Éloïse Rome	Cyrus	English: The Investigations of Éloïse Rome; Episode: "Lieutenant Casanova"
2005	S.A.C.: Des hommes dans l'ombre	Jean Augé	TV film; English: S.A.C.: Men in the Shadows
2007	Reporters	Paul Guérin	5 episodes
2008–2010	La cour des grands	Julien Valette	English: The Great and the Good; 15 episodes
2009	Duel en ville	Joël Delpierre	TV film; English: Duel in Town
2009	Un flic	Gu	English: A Cop; Episode: "Bruit numérique" ("Digital Noise")
2009	Braquo	Max Rossi	Episode: "Max"
2009, 2013	Les Petits Meurtres d'Agatha Christie	Etienne Bousquet/André Simonet	English: The Little Murders of Agatha Christie; 2 episodes
2010	Le chasseur	Gilles Mercier (uncredited)	TV series; English: The Hunter
2011	Les beaux mecs	Guido	English title: Tony's Revenge; 8 episodes
2011	Mister Bob	SDECE agent	TV film
2012	The Gordji Affair	Jacques Dor	TV film
2012	Inquisitio	Recteur de turennes	8 episodes
2013	La collection – Ecrire pour... le jeu des sept familles	General Gagmanikof	English: The Collection – Writing for... The Game of the Seven Families; Episode: "Zygomatiques" ("Zygomatic")
2013	Mon ami Pierrot	Serge	TV film; English: My Friend Pierrot
2014	Les hommes de l'ombre	Benoît Hussan	English title: Spin; 6 episodes
2014	Rosemary's Baby	Commissioner Fontaine	Miniseries
2015	The Last Panthers	Roman	4 episodes
2015–2017	Re-belle	La Planche à Billet	TV miniseries
2016	Trepalium	Robinson	6 episodes
2016	The Tunnel	Paul Bresson	Episode #2.1
2016–2018	Guyane	Antoine Serra	16 episodes
2018	Black Earth Rising	Brigadier General Lesage	2 episodes
2021	Police de Caractères	Rémi Delassalle	Episode: "Post Mortem"
2021	A Familiar Stranger	Paul	8 episodes
2022	Astrid: Murder in Paris	Bergeaud	Episode: "En Souterrain" ("Underground")
2023	Polar Park	Frère Auguste	6 episodes
2024	Franklin	Jean-Charles-Pierre Lenoir	6 episodes
