= Editoria & Spettacolo =

Publishing house in Rome, Italy

- Parent company: Editoria & Spettacolo di Maximilian La Monica I.i.
- Status: Active
- Founded: 2001
- Founder: Maximilian La Monica
- Country of origin: Italy
- Headquarters location: Spoleto (Province of Perugia)
- Distribution: Worldwide
- Publication types: Books and multimedia
- Nonfiction topics: Theater and spectacle
- Official website: www.editoriaespettacolo.it

The Italian publishing house Editoria & Spettacolo di Maximilian La Monica I.i. was established in 2001 in Rome. Under the initiative of Maximilian La Monica, they specialize in the publication of theater and spectacle editions.

== Authors ==
Have been published or are published with Editoria & Spettacolo, among others, the following authors:

- Fabio Acca (Italy)
- Edoardo Albinati (Italy)
- Barbara Alesse (Italy)
- Alfonso Amendola (Italy)
- Loula Anagnostaki (Greece)
- Marino Stefano Angelucci (Italy)
- Gian Maria Annovi (Italy)
- Carla Romana Antolini (Italy)
- Peter Asmussen (Denmark)
- Simone Azzurrini (Italy)
- Babilonia Teatri (Italy)
- Maria Angela Baiardi (Italy)
- Andrea Balzola (Italy)
- Davide Barbato (Italy)
- Nello Barile (Italy)
- Alberto Bassetti (Italy)
- Sergi Belbel (Spain)
- Carmelo Bene (Italy)
- Maria Teresa Berardelli (Italy)
- Letizia Bernazza (Italy)
- Paolo Bignami (Italy)
- Peter Biskind (United States)
- Paola Bono (Italy)
- Chiara Boscaro (Italy)
- Guillermo Calderón (Chile)
- Marco Calvani (Italy)
- Duccio Camerini (Italy)
- Leonardo Capuano (Italy)
- Gianina Carbunariu (Romania)
- Davide Carnevali (Italy)
- Massimo Carosi (Italy)
- Marina Carr (Ireland)
- Tino Caspanello (Italy)
- Carlo Cecchi (Italy)
- Ascanio Celestini (Italy)
- Gian Maria Cervo (Italy)
- Giovanni Chiara (Italy)
- Clelia Falletti (Italy)
- Gianni Clementi (Italy)
- Gioia Costa (Italy)
- Martin Crimp (England)
- Fabrizio Cruciani (Italy)
- Fabiola Crudeli (Italy)
- Lidia Curti (Italy
- Horacio Czertok (Italy)
- Ada d'Adamo (Italy)
- Enrico D'Elia (Italy)
- Franco D'Ippolito (Italy)
- Emma Dante (Italy)
- Ombretta De Biase (Italy)
- Accademia degli Artefatti (Italy)
- Angela Dematté (Italy)
- Desirée Veronica Leone (Italy)
- Güngör Dilmen (Turkey)
- Marco Di Stefano (Italy)
- Gaspare Dori (Italy)
- Ilaria Drago (Italy)
- Teatro El Galpón (Uruguay)
- Davide Enia (Italy)
- Clelia Falletti (Italy)
- Gabriela Fantato (Italy)
- Alessandro Fea (Italy)
- Angelo Ferracuti (Italy)
- Federica Festa (Italy)
- Georges Feydeau (France)
- Maria Ficara (Italy)
- Marcello Fois (Italy)
- Jon Fosse (Norway)
- Tiziano Fratus (Italy)
- Gabriele Frasca (Italy)
- Francesco Galli (Italy)
- Nino Gennaro (Italy)
- Naira Gonzalez (Argentina)
- Graziano Graziani (Italy)
- Ramon Griffero (Chile)
- Collettivo Curatoriale Gruntumolani (Italy)
- Serena Guarracino (Italy)
- Andy Hamilton (UK)
- Juan Pablo Heras (Spain)
- Oriza Hirata (Japan)
- Hugo von Hofmannsthal (Austria)
- Israel Horovitz (United States)
- Fenanda Hrelia (Italy)
- Valerio Iacobini (Italy)
- Antonio Iannotta (Italy)
- Isabella Imperiali (Italy)
- Caterina Inesi (Italy)
- Manuela Infante Güell (Chile)
- Katia Ippaso (Italy)
- Marcello Isidori (Italy)
- Mauricio Kartun (Argentina)
- Maximilian La Monica (Italy)
- Jacopo Lanteri (Italy)
- Antonio Latella (Italy)
- Roberto Latini (Italy)
- Alessandra Marino (Italy)
- Sandro Lombardi (Italy)
- Angelo Longoni (Italy)
- Manna Vincenzo (Italy)
- Samantha Marenzi (Italy)
- Massimo Marino (Italy)
- Marco Martinelli (Italy)
- Mario Martone (Italy)
- Yannis Mavritsakis (Greece)
- Camilla Migliori (Italy)
- Francesca Montanino (Italy)
- Fabio Morotti (Italy)
- Gina Moxley (Ireland)
- Andrea Nanni (Italy)
- Barbara Nativi (Italy)
- Toshiki Okada (Japan)
- Massimo Paganelli (Italy)
- Laura Pariani (Italy)
- Paloma Pedrero (Spain)
- Maria Dolores Pesce (Italy)
- Mauro Petruzziello (Italy)
- Sergio Pierattini (Italy)
- Pietro Gaglianò (Italy)
- Vincenzo Pirrotta (Italy)
- Paolo Poli (Italy)
- Olivier Py (France)
- Ferdinand Raimund (Austria)
- Ursula Rani Sarma (Ireland)
- Mark Ravenhill (England)
- Tristan Rémy (France)
- Philip Ridley (UK)
- Cesare Ronconi (Italy)
- Juan Carlos Rubio (Spain)
- Francesco Ruffini (Italy)
- Paolo Ruffini (Italy)
- Letizia Russo (Italy)
- Yoji Sakate (Japan)
- Michele Santeramo (Italy)
- Graham Saunders (England)
- Tiziano Scarpa (Italy)
- Attilio Scarpellini (Italy)
- Toni Servillo (Italy)
- Massimo Sgorbani (Italy)
- William Shakespeare (England)
- Aleks Sierz (Italy)
- Gabriele Sofia (Italy)
- Andrea Strappa (Italy)
- Rolando Tarquini (Italy)
- Silvia Tarquini (Italy)
- Teatro Aperto (Italy)
- Veronica Tinnirello (Italy)
- Dario Tomasello (Italy)
- Gian Maria Tosatti (Italy)
- VItalyno Trevisan (Italy)
- Adam Vaccaro (Italy)
- Marta Valenti (Italy)
- Cristina Valenti (Italy)
- Daniel Veronese (Italy)
- José Maria Vieira Mendes (Portugal)
- Daniele Vita (Italy)
- Timberlake Wertenbaker (England)
- Pei Yang Ling (China)
- Michael Zammit (Malta)
- Nicola Zavagli (Italy)
- Ettore Zocaro (Italy)

== Book series ==
Editoria & Spettacolo publishes the following Book series:

- Antigone (theater books at 360 degrees);
- Canti (poetry and writing contemporary);
- disseminazioni (essays and saggistica and theater plays);
- È (editorial project of Ente Teatrale Italiano);
- faretesto (Italian contemporary drama);
- Fuori Collana (collective contributions and varied publishing);
- ideAzioni (monographs dedicated to artists on the contemporary scene);
- Percorsi (theater plays, drama scripts, theater poetry);
- Programmi di sala (theater programs);
- ripercorsi (theater plays);
- Scritture (anthologies of authors from Europe and other cultures, Italian monographs, texts of experimental theater, theater poetry, thematic texts, scriptures of the stage director);
- Sguardi di stranieri (photography and writing);
- Spaesamenti (theater and dance contemporary);
- Teatro e dintorni (guide to the performing arts);
- Tendenze (depth, monographic essays, studies contemporary phenomena of the scene, reasoned guide to the new languages of research, history of the modern spectacle, performance techniques and generations, frontier theaters, theaters of the dialect, literary translations);
- Visioni (monographs and essays of theater and performance).

== Other activities ==
Editoria & Spettacolo also operates two web portals:

- "Teatro e Dintorni": a guide to the performing arts, which provides technical information on theaters, productions, festivals, technical services, schools, etc.;
- "Cultura e Spettacolo": integrated entertainment observatory, center studies of online research for the development of the theater, entertainment and publishing industry.

== Fersen Prize ==
Editoria & Spettacolo, from 2004 intends to promote the "Fersen" Prize for the promotion and dissemination of contemporary Italian drama, dedicated to Alessandro Fersen, in its sections "Dramatic opera" and "Monologue".

From 2012 was accompanied by the "Fersen" Prize for director, for writers, directors, actors and/or companies which propose the construction of one of the texts of the past winners of the previous drama Prize.
