= Crawl (2012 film) =

- Directed by: Hervé Lasgouttes
- Screenplay by: Hervé Lasgouttes; Loïc Delafoulhouze
- Produced by: Stéphanie Douet
- Starring: Swann Arlaud; Anne Marivin; Nina Meurisse; Gilles Cohen
- Cinematography: Emmanuelle Le Fur
- Edited by: Laurence Bawedin
- Music by: Raphaël Ibanez de Garayo
- Release date: 2012
- Language: French

Crawl is a 2012 French comedy-drama film co-written and directed by Hervé Lasgouttes, in his directorial debut. It premiered in the Venice Days sidebar of the 69th Venice International Film Festival, in which it won the Europa Cinemas Label for best European film.

== Cast ==
- Swann Arlaud as Martin
- Anne Marivin as Corinne
- Nina Meurisse as Gwen
- Gilles Cohen as Jean
- Jean-Marie Frin as Martin and Corinne’s father
- François Berland as the judge
