= The Horde (2009 film) =

2009 French horror film

- French film poster
- French: La Horde
- Directed by: Benjamin Rocher; Yannick Dahan
- Screenplay by: Arnaud Bordas; Yannick Dahan; Stephane Moissakis; Benjamin Rocher
- Produced by: Raphaël Rocher
- Starring: Claude Perron; Jean-Pierre Martins; Eriq Ebouaney; Aurélien Recoing; Doudou Masta; Antoine Oppenheim; Jo Prestia; Yves Pignot
- Cinematography: Julien Meurice
- Edited by: Dimitri Amar
- Music by: Christopher Lennertz
- Production companies: Capture [The Flag] Films; Le Pacte; Coficup; Canal+ CinéCinéma
- Distributed by: Le Pacte
- Release date: 28 August 2009
- Running time: 96 minutes
- Country: France
- Language: French
- Budget: $2 million
- Box office: $688,225

The Horde (French: La Horde) is a 2009 French horror film co-written and directed by Yannick Dahan and Benjamin Rocher. It stars Claude Perron, Jean-Pierre Martins, Eriq Ebouaney and Aurélien Recoing.

== Plot ==
A group of French policemen embark on a mission of vengeance after a colleague is killed by a notorious drug dealer. He is holed up in a condemned high-rise in the heart of a derelict and corrupt Paris neighborhood (ZUP). They storm the social housing complex with the intent of taking him down, but the operation is a failure and the team is captured. Suddenly, both sides are confronted by an altogether different opponent, zombies. Cops and criminals must now forge an uneasy alliance to survive the undead onslaught.

== Cast ==
- Claude Perron as Aurore
- Jean-Pierre Martins as Ouessem "Ouesse"
- Eriq Ebouaney as Adewale Markudi
- Yves Pignot as René
- Doudou Masta as Bola Markudi
- Jo Prestia as José
- Antoine Oppenheim as Tony
- Aurélien Recoing as Jimenez

== Production ==
The film was shot in Paris, France in 2008 and released in 2009. The film was released in North America in 2010.

== Release ==
The film premiered on August 28, 2009 in London as part of the London FrightFest Film Festival. It had a cinema release with 200 screens in France on February 10, 2010. In December 2009 IFC Films acquired the rights for the U.S. release. It was part of the Sitges Film Festival in 2009. The film had a limited U.S. theatrical release in August 2010.

== Reception ==
The film won two Garner awards for the Best Screenplay and Best Special Effects or Cinematography at Fantasporto Film Festival.

The film received mixed reviews from critics. The film holds a 45% approval rating on Rotten Tomatoes, based on 20 critical reviews with an average rating of 4.81/10.
