= The Nun (2013 film) =

2013 film

- French theatrical release poster
- French: La Religieuse
- Directed by: Guillaume Nicloux
- Written by: Guillaume Nicloux; Jérôme Beaujour
- Based on: La Religieuse by Denis Diderot
- Produced by: Sylvie Pialat; Jacques-Henri Bronckart; Olivier Bronckart
- Starring: Pauline Étienne; Isabelle Huppert; Louise Bourgoin; Martina Gedeck; Françoise Lebrun
- Cinematography: Yves Cape
- Edited by: Guy Lecorne
- Music by: Max Richter
- Production companies: Les Films du Worso; Belle Epoque Films; Versus Production
- Distributed by: Le Pacte (France)
- Release dates: 10 February 2013 (Berlinale); 20 March 2013 (France)
- Running time: 100 minutes
- Countries: France; Belgium; Germany
- Language: French
- Budget: €5.5 million

The Nun (French: La Religieuse) is a 2013 French drama film directed by Guillaume Nicloux. It is based on the 18th-century novel La Religieuse by French writer Denis Diderot. The film premiered in competition at the 63rd Berlin International Film Festival. It received two nominations at the 4th Magritte Awards, winning Best Actress for Pauline Étienne, and a nomination at the 39th César Awards. Production companies included Les Films du Worso, Belle Epoque Films and Versus Production.

== Plot ==
Taking place in the 1760s France, a young girl named Suzanne Simonin is forced by her parents to become a nun. She learns that as an illegitimate child, she is expected to atone for her mother's sin. Her abbess treats her kindly, but when the abbess dies and another takes her place, Suzanne considers breaking her vows. Due to the maltreatment and physical abuse she undergoes, she is thrown into a world of punishment in which she suffers dehumanization. Suzanne is filled with despair and mental torment. It is not until a friend gives Suzanne some hope that she may not have to remain a nun forever and that Suzanne's punishment lifts.

== Cast ==
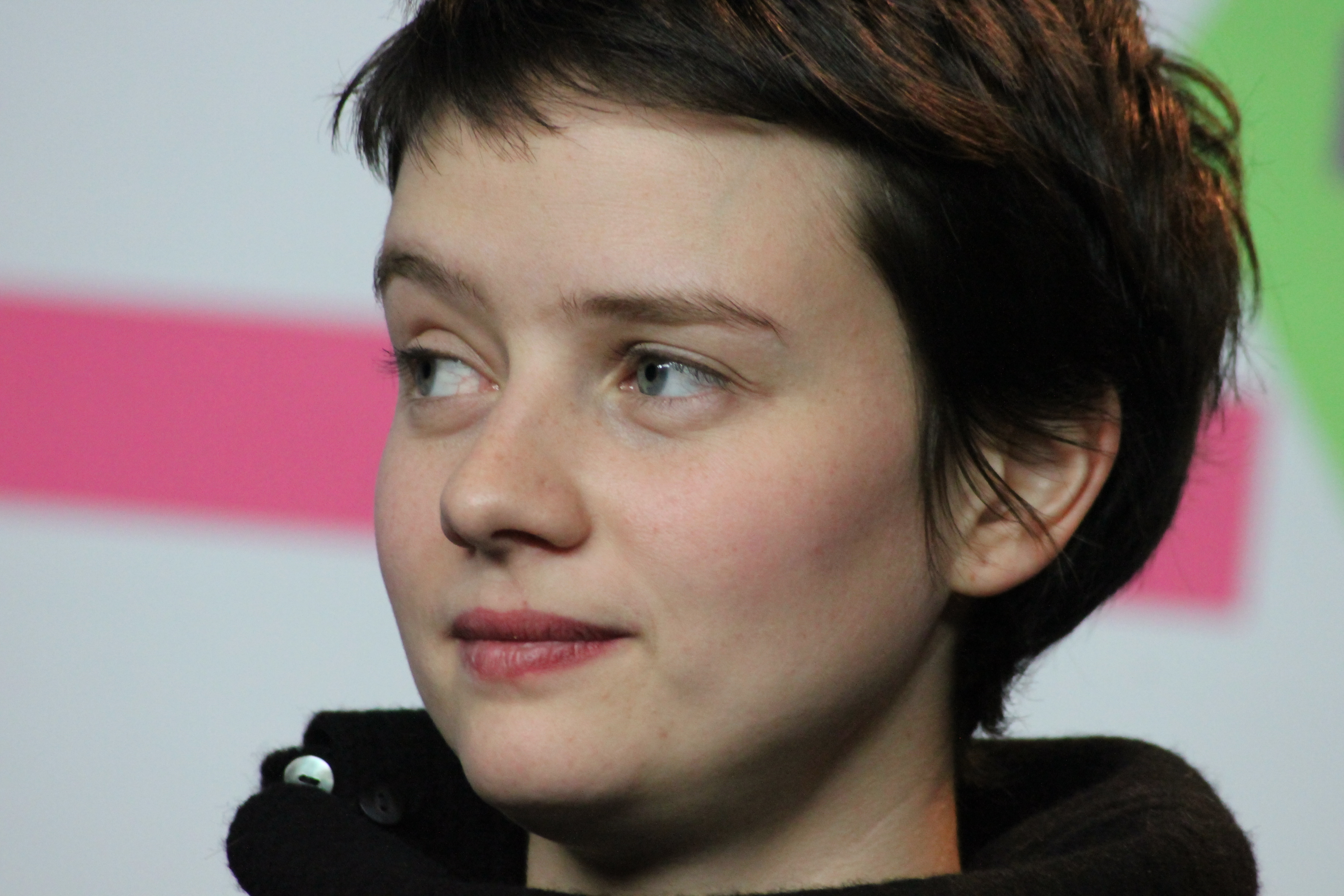
Pauline Étienne at the 63rd Berlin International Film Festival

- Pauline Étienne as Suzanne Simonin
- Isabelle Huppert as Abbess Saint Eutrope
- Louise Bourgoin as Abbess Christine
- Martina Gedeck as Suzanne's mother
- Françoise Lebrun as Madame de Moni
- Agathe Bonitzer as Sister Thérèse
- Alice de Lencquesaing as Sister Ursule
- Gilles Cohen as Suzanne's father
- Marc Barbé as Father Castella
- François Négret as Maître Manouri
- Nicolas Jouhet as clergyman Sainte Marie
- Pascal Bongard as Archdeacon
- Fabrizio Rongione as Father Morante

== Reception ==
The Hollywood Reporter's Jordan Mintzer highlighted that director Nicloux and his co-writer Beaujour breathed new life into the classic story by making the protagonist "much more of a fighting spirit" and by adding a "revised ending". He said this film was "held together by a terrific lead performance". Variety's Boyd van Hoeij certified the film was "slickly assembled" and frequently provided a "painting-like" cinematography. Cine Vue's Patrick Gamble judged The Nun suffered from an "inability to deviate from absurdity".

== Awards and nominations ==
Award	Category	Nominee	Result
Berlin International Film Festival	Golden Berlin Bear	Guillaume Nicloux	Nominated
César Awards	Most Promising Actress	Pauline Etienne	Nominated
Lumière Awards	Best Female Revelation	Pauline Etienne	Nominated
Magritte Awards	Best Foreign Film in Coproduction		Nominated
Magritte Awards	Best Actress	Pauline Etienne	Won

== See also ==
- Isabelle Huppert on screen and stage
