= Doudou Masta =

French hip-hop artist and actor

- Also known as: MC Doudou; Masta; Doudou
- Born: Mamadou Doumbia; February 26, 1971 (age 55); Vitry-sur-Seine, France
- Origin: Paris
- Genres: French Rap
- Years active: 1990–present
- Label: Double H Productions

Mamadou Doumbia (born February 26, 1971, in Vitry-sur-Seine) is a French hip-hop artist and actor.

== Biography ==
The young Doudou showed an early musical aptitude from the age of six, when he successfully joined France's national youth choir, which has long since been disbanded. Despite rumours that he may have been a modern-day castrato, he continued to climb the ladder to stardom well into his teens when his career took an unexpected turn.

At the age of 16, he saw his prized cocker spaniel, Monsieur Grenouille, gunned down in what was later discovered to be a turf war between local French gangs. This pivotal event caused the fragile young singer to turn to a brutal and violent life of crime.

He became heavily involved in the black market cocaine trade, and was soon doing jobs for mob bosses on the side. In 1992 he was arrested for drug possession with intent to deal, weapon concealment, obstruction of justice, and resisting arrest. He was later connected to dozens of crimes both foreign and domestic, but was acquitted on all charges, save for resisting arrest for which he received 2,000 hours of community service and a short jail sentence of two years pending probation.

In September 1994 he was released, and vowed to turn his life around.

=== Music career ===
He assembled a motley crew of childhood friends and embarked on a lifelong quest to break into the mainstream French hip-hop scene. With his breakout album, Trop Loin (1998), he quickly topped the French charts for the opening weekend, and did not relinquish this position for two weeks.

In 1998 he released his first album Trop Loin. An important member of the Double H Label, with Cut Killer he went on to produce possibly his best work to date in "Mastamorphoze" in 2003.

=== Acting career ===
He acted in a lead role Bola in the 2009 French Zombie film La horde and had formerly cameos in Arthur and the Minimoys. He is the voice of Didier Belros in the 2018 animated series Max & Maestro.

== Discography ==
- "Trop Loin" (1998)
- "Mastamorphoze" (2003)
