= Tino Caspanello =

Italian playwright and director (born 1960)

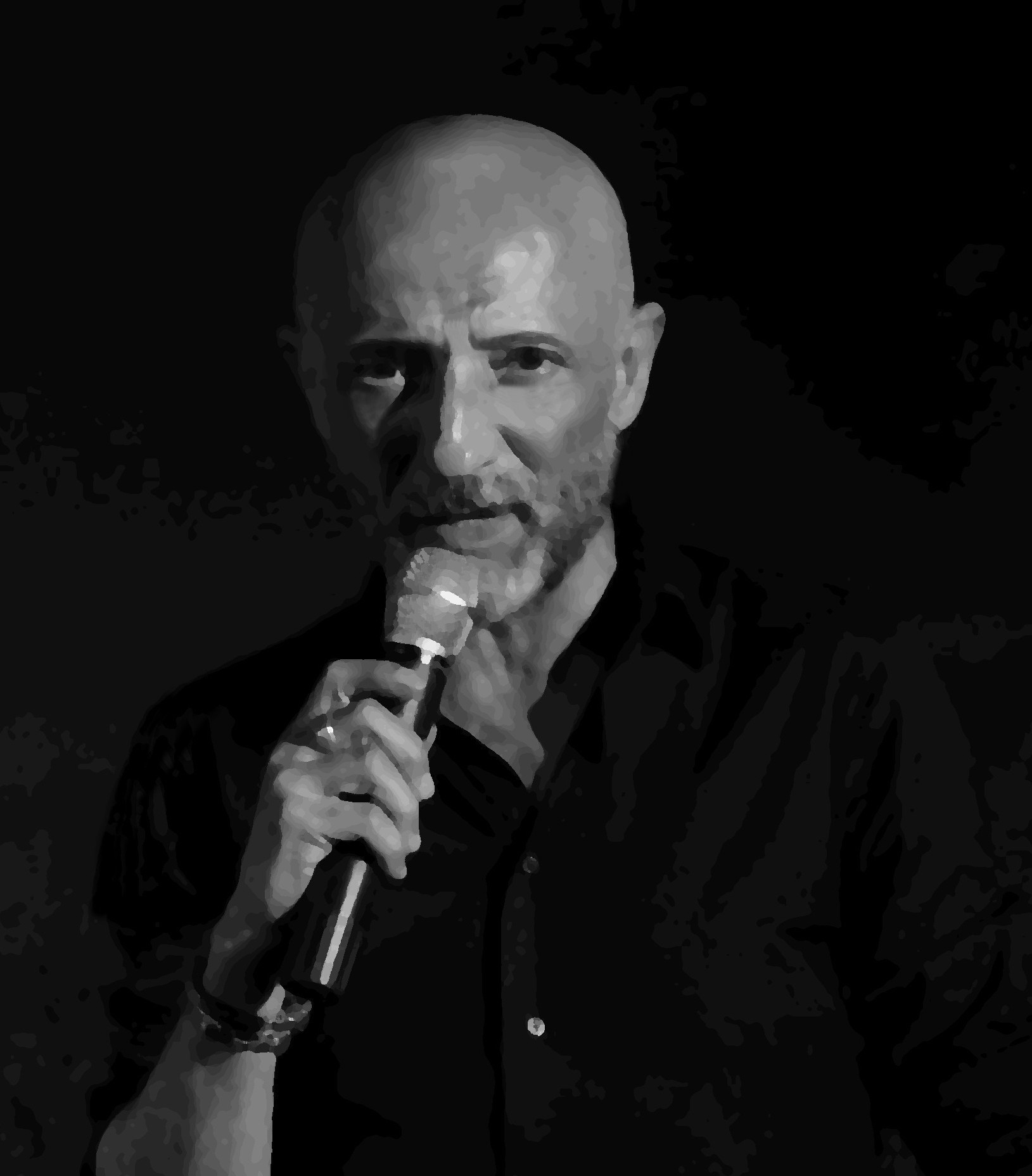
- Tino Caspanello in 2018
- Born: 1960 (age 64–65); Pagliara (Messina), Italy
- Occupations: Playwright, director and novelist

Agatino "Tino" Caspanello (born 1960) is an Italian playwright, theatre director, actor and novelist. He has written, performed in, and directed plays in Italy and elsewhere, and in 2003 he earned the Premio Riccione Teatro (Special Jury Prize, 2003) for his play Mari (The Sea).

In 1993 Caspanello founded the theatre company Teatro Pubblico Incanto, which has produced many of his plays, including Mari (premiered in 2004), Quadri di una rivoluzione (2015), Niño (2016), Bar Stella (2020), Era ottobre (2023) and Non siamo qui (2023).

== Early life and education ==
Caspanello was born in Pagliara, Province of Messina, Sicily. He graduated in scenography in 1983 from the Academy of Fine Arts in Perugia.

== Career ==
In 1993 Caspanello founded the theatre company Teatro Pubblico Incanto, which has produced most of his plays. In its early years, the company produced adaptations of plays by Rosso di San Secondo, Shakespeare, Pirandello, Wilcock, Albee and others, but soon focused on Caspanello's own plays.

In 2011, Caspanello and the Teatro Pubblico Incanto first produced the contemporary theatre and art festival, the Pubblico Incanto Artheatre Festival.

=== Early productions ===
In 2003 Caspanello's play Mari (The Sea) received the Special Jury Prize of the Premio Riccione Teatro, awarded for playwriting. In 2004 the two-character play premiered at the Santarcangelo dei Teatri Festival, directed by and starring Caspanello, and also starring his wife, Cinzia Muscolino. Translated into French by Frank and Bruno La Brasca, the play has been produced by the French companies Cie La Strada, La Lune Blanche, L’Instant avant l’Aube, In May 2011, the Théâtre de l'Atelier in Paris produced Mari with Lea Drucker and Gilles Cohen, directed by Jean-Louis Benoît. In June 2012 Mari was presented in Polish at the Bez Granic Festival in Cieszyn, Poland. The french version of the play produced by the Compagnie La Lune Blanche was staged at the Festival d’Avignon Off in 2016. In November 2016 Caspanello directed Mari with Muscolino, at the University of Chicago Center at the University of Hong Kong. In 2018, Mari inaugurated the Tramedautore Festival at the Piccolo Teatro (Milan).

In 2008 Caspanello directed the three-character play Handscape, based on the texts of blogs and edited by Caspanello, which premiered at the Schauspielhaus in Graz, Austria; it starred Caspanello, Muscolino and Calabrò. In May 2011, together with other playwrights from Belgium, Turkey, Canada and Poland, Caspanello was a guest at the Troisième Bureau of Grenoble at the Festival Regards Croisés, during which his three-character play Nta ll'aria (In the air) was presented as a mise-en-espace in French. In July 2011 Caspanello and his wife directed the festival Pubblico Incanto Artheater Festival, which took place in Sicily, in the municipality of Pagliara. In 2011, Caspanello directed his two-character play Interno (Interior). Caspanello performed the play opposite his regular collaborator Tino Calabrò at the Teatro Vittorio Emanuele – Sala Laudamo in Messina. In April 2013 the play, translated into Greek by Tzina Karvounaki and directed by Andreas Koutsourelis, was produced as part of the Contemporary Drama Forum at the French Institute in Athens.

In 2015, his Quadri di una rivoluzione (Pictures from a Revolution) premiered at Nuovo Teatro Sanità in Naples; Caspanello directed and starred in the four-character play, which also starred Muscolino. On 15 April 2016, a seminar dedicated to Caspanello took place at the Library of the Italian Cultural Institute in Paris as part of Corps à corps. Récits de théâtre italien, a series of seminars organized in association with Paris-Sorbonne. Between 2016 and 2020 Caspanello directed the project WRITE – International Playwriting Residency held in Mandanici in Messina, Italy, involving European playwrights. The same year, his one-character play Niño (Boy) was produced at Teatro Cerca Casa and Casa Santanelli, both near Naples; Caspanello directed, and Muscolino starred. The play was revived the following year at Clan Off Teatro in Messina. Also in 2017, his play Orli (Bounds) premiered at the theatre Cantieri Culturali della Zisa in Palermo, produced by Suttascupa Theatre Company and directed by Giuseppe Massa.

=== Later productions ===
His three-character play Bar Stella (Star Bar) premiered in 2020 at Teatro dei 3 Mestieri in Messina; Caspanello directed. The cast included Muscolino and Calabrò. In 2021 Caspanello directed his two-character play Fragile at the Teatro Comunale di Nardò in the Province of Lecce. Later that year, Quadri di una rivoluzione was revived in Albanian at the National Theatre of Kosovo in Pristina. In 2023 the same play, translated into French by Christophe Mileschi, was staged in Paris by Artanso – Collectif Artistique at the Théâtre Le Funambule Montmartre. Also in 2023, Non siamo qui (We Are Not Here) premiered at Teatro dei 3 Mestieri in Messina; Caspanello directed the two-hander, which starred Muscolino and Calabrò. In 2024, Caspanello directed J. Rodolfo Wilcock's two-character play Elisabetta e Limone for Teatro dei 3 Mestieri in Messina at three different venues, starring Muscolino; a reviewer wrote, "Caspanello's poetic and imaginative direction offers form, voice, figures and matter to the visionary and surreal intensity of Wilcock's text."

In 2025 his play Orli was translated into English by Haun Saussy. Titled Bounds, it was revived at the City Garage Theater, in Santa Monica, California, directed by Frédérique Michel. In the same year, Quadri di una rivoluzione (Pictures from a Revolution), translated into English by Saussy, was mounted at Upstream Theater, St. Louis, Missouri. His play Era ottobre (It Was October) was also produced that year at Piccolo Teatro Giullare in Salerno; Caspanello directed and starred alongside Calabrò in the two-hander. Also in 2025, Fragile was revived at the Tex-Teatro in San Vito dei Normanni in Brindisi.

=== Teaching and novels ===
Caspanello has taught theatre at the University of Messina, at the Vittorio Emanuele Theatre in Messina and elsewhere. In 2024, he conducted his last drama workshop at a high school in Santa Teresa di Riva, in the Province of Messina.

Caspanello has written two novels: Salvo, a short novel set in a small Sicilian town, published in 2016, and Santa, la guerra, which addresses the impact of war and the persistence of hope in everyday life published in 2022.

== Plays ==
Caspanello's plays have been described as "structured around non-places, in other words borders, such as the one between water and sand for Mari, the inside and the outside for Nta ll'aria, the familiar and the unknown for Malastrada. [It is] marked by a strong presence of the elements (respectively water, air, fire and earth...). ... [His] work attempts to reconstruct, in a metaphysical vision, fragments of life, small daily flashes that, too often, we find difficult to perceive". An interviewer wrote that Caspanello "tries to reconstruct, in a metaphysical vision, fragments of life, small daily flashes that we too often have difficulty perceiving."

20 of Caspanello's plays are collected in four volumes published in Spoleto, Italy, by Editoria & Spettacolo:

- Teatro di Tino Caspanello (contains the plays Mari, Nta ll'aria, Malastrada, Rosa, Interno, Sira and Fragile), 2012, ISBN 978-88-97276-22-7
- Quadri di una rivoluzione di Tino Caspanello (contains the plays Quasi notte, Quadri di una rivoluzione, 1952 a Danilo Dolci, Terre and 1 - 2 p.m.), 2013, ISBN 978-88-97276-45-6.
- Polittico del silenzio (contains the plays Ecce Homo, Kyrie and Agnus), 2016, ISBN 978-88-97276-63-0
- Sottotraccia (contains the plays Sottotraccia, Orli, Blues, Niño and Don't Cry Joe), 2018, ISBN 978-88-97276-98-2

Several of Caspanello's plays have been translated and published or performed in France, Belgium (in French), Kosovo (in Albanian), Turkey and the United States.

== Personal life ==
Caspanello is married to Cinzia Muscolino, an actress and artist who has often performed in his plays with Teatro Pubblico Incanto.

== Awards and recognition ==
- 2003 - Special Prize of the Jury of Premio Riccione Teatro for Mari
- 2008 - Award of the National Association of Theatre Critics, Italy
- 2014 - Palmarès Eurodram, Italian Committee, for Quadri di una rivoluzione (Picture from a revolution)
- 2018 - Award of the National Association of Theatre Critics, Italy, for Write - Residence of international dramaturgy
- 2019 - Palmarès Eurodram, Albanian Committee, for Mari
- 2023 - Palmarès Eurodram, Ukrainian Committee, for Orli (Bounds)
