= Being Blanche Houellebecq =

2024 film directed by Guillaume Nicloux

- Directed by: Guillaume Nicloux
- Written by: Guillaume Nicloux
- Produced by: François Kraus; Denis Pineau-Valencienne
- Starring: Blanche Gardin; Michel Houellebecq
- Cinematography: Christophe Offenstein
- Edited by: Guy Lecorne
- Music by: Christophe Chassol
- Production company: Les Films du kiosque
- Distributed by: BAC Films
- Release date: 13 March 2024
- Running time: 88 minutes
- Country: France
- Language: French

Being Blanche Houellebecq (French: Dans la peau de Blanche Houellebecq) is a 2024 French comedy film written and directed by Guillaume Nicloux. It stars Blanche Gardin and Michel Houellebecq and revolves around a Houellebecq look-alike contest held in Guadeloupe. Following The Kidnapping of Michel Houellebecq (2014) and Thalasso (2019), it is the third part in Nicloux's trilogy of films where Houellebecq plays a version of himself.

== Cast ==
- Blanche Gardin as Blanche Gardin
- Michel Houellebecq as Michel Houellebecq
- Luc Schwarz as Luc, Michel's friend and bodyguard
- Franck Monier as Frank
