= The End (2016 film) =

- Film poster
- Directed by: Guillaume Nicloux
- Written by: Guillaume Nicloux
- Produced by: Sylvie Pialat; Benoît Quainon
- Starring: Gérard Depardieu
- Cinematography: Christophe Offenstein
- Edited by: Guy Lecorne
- Music by: Éric Demarsan
- Production companies: Les Films du Worso; LGM Cinéma
- Distributed by: Gaumont
- Release dates: 14 February 2016 (Berlinale); 8 April 2016 (France - VOD)
- Running time: 85 minutes
- Country: France
- Language: French

The End is a 2016 French mystery drama film written and directed by Guillaume Nicloux and starring Gérard Depardieu. The film premiered in the Forum section at the 66th Berlin International Film Festival. It was released on VOD on 8 April 2016.

== Synopsis ==
A man goes hunting in the forest. His dog runs away, and the man ends up losing his way. Disoriented, tired, and without food, he wanders until one evening, when he finds refuge in a cave. But when he wakes up, his rifle has been stolen.

== Cast ==
- Gérard Depardieu as The man
- Audrey Bonnet as The woman
- Swann Arlaud as The young man
- Xavier Beauvois as Hiker
- Didier Abot as Guy

== Accolades ==
Award / Film Festival	Category	Recipients and nominees	Result
Lumière Awards	Best Actor	Gérard Depardieu	Nominated
