= The Kidnapping of Michel Houellebecq =

- Directed by: Guillaume Nicloux
- Screenplay by: Guillaume Nicloux
- Produced by: Sylvie Pialat
- Starring: Michel Houellebecq; Mathieu Nicourt; Maxime Lefrançois; Luc Schwarz; Françoise Lebrun
- Cinematography: Christophe Offenstein
- Edited by: Guy Lecorne
- Production companies: Les Films du Worso; Chic Films; ARTE France
- Release date: 8 February 2014 (Berlinale)
- Running time: 93 minutes
- Country: France
- Language: French

The Kidnapping of Michel Houellebecq (French: L'enlèvement de Michel Houellebecq) is a 2014 French comedy-drama film directed by Guillaume Nicloux, starring Michel Houellebecq, Mathieu Nicourt, Maxime Lefrançois and Luc Schwarz. It tells the story of how the famous author Michel Houellebecq is kidnapped and held for ransom by three men during a promotional tour in 2011.

The film was inspired by a rumour which occurred while Houellebecq was promoting his novel The Map and the Territory. For some time, he appeared to give no signs of life, which made newspapers in France speculate that he had been kidnapped. In reality he only had some trouble with his Internet connection. The film premiered at the 2014 Berlin International Film Festival where it played in the Forum section. The film is a Les Films du Worso, Chic Films and ARTE France production.

Nicloux's films Thalasso (2019) and Being Blanche Houellebecq (2024) also stars Houellebecq in the role as himself and have been described as a follow-ups to The Kidnapping of Michel Houellebecq.

== Cast ==
- Michel Houellebecq as Michel Houellebecq
- Mathieu Nicourt as Mathieu
- Maxime Lefrançois as Max
- Luc Schwarz as Luc
- Françoise Lebrun as Françoise

== Reception ==
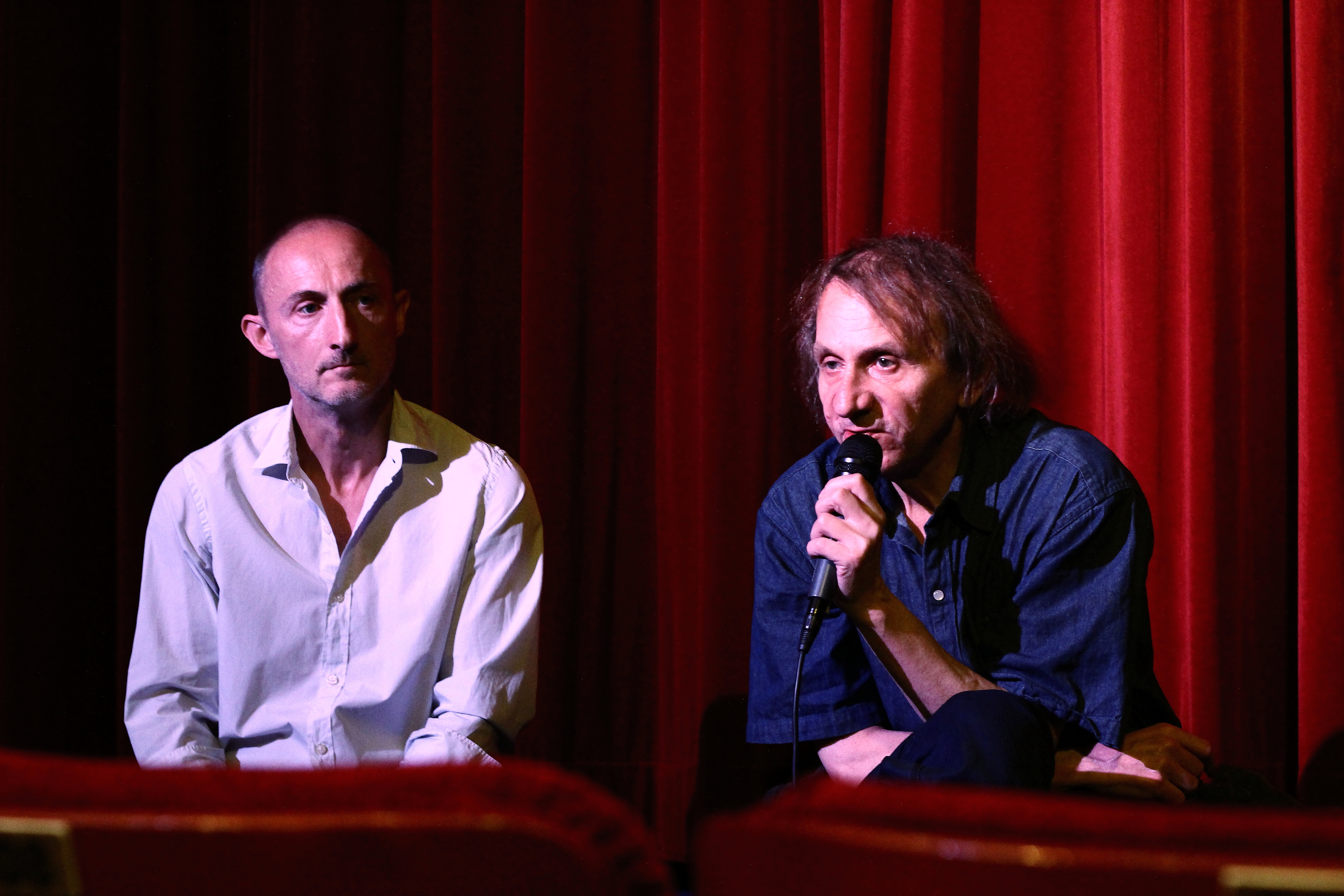
Nicloux and Houellebecq during a presentation of the film

Scott Foundas wrote in Variety: "Mostly, the film turns on the curious chemistry between Houellebecq and his captors, who insist on engaging the writer in intellectual debate, despite their obvious disadvantages in this realm, querying him about Auschwitz, the Armenian genocide, his 1991 H.P. Lovecraft biography, and the 'rules' governing Alexandrine poetry." Foundas continued: "None of this would work nearly so well were Houellebecq not such a hoot playing himself — or at least a shambling, sad-sack version of himself, at once bolstering and gently skewering his self-perpetuated image of the author as misanthropic recluse. (More than one critic in Berlin likened Houellebecq's screen persona to that of a Gallic Larry David.) In what is effectively a one-joke movie, the joke is a good one, and Nicloux ... manages to keep the comic energy high for almost the entire 90-minute running time."

John Waters included the film in his top 10 films of 2014.
