= Switch (2011 film) =

- Film poster
- Directed by: Frédéric Schœndœrffer
- Starring: Karine Vanasse; Eric Cantona
- Release date: 6 July 2011
- Running time: 104 minutes
- Country: France
- Language: French
- Budget: $6.3 million
- Box office: $3 million

Switch is a 2011 French action film directed by Frédéric Schœndœrffer.

== Plot ==
Sophie Malaterre, an unemployed Canadian graphic designer, spontaneously accepts a chance of a holiday abroad when she learns of a website called "Switch", through which she can temporarily swap her home for someone else's. Sophie arranges a swap for a Paris apartment owned by a woman called Bénédicte Serteaux. They exchange their apartment keys by mail and Sophie flies to Paris.

On arrival, Sophie is delighted with her “holiday” apartment, although she notices one room is locked, and she has not been provided with the key. While out in the city, she briefly meets a young man called Kourosh, who gives her his phone number so she can call him for a date. The next morning, police storm into the apartment and proceed to search it. In the locked room, a headless corpse of Thomas Huygens, the boyfriend of Bénédicte Serteaux is discovered. The police arrest Sophie, believing her to be Bénédicte.

In the apartment, investigators find a passport with Sophie's photo, in the name of Bénédicte Serteaux. All traces of the Switch website, and Sophie's flight to Paris, have disappeared from the internet. Neighbours identify Sophie's photo as that of Bénédicte, and so does Bénédicte's mother. Sophie is taken for a psychiatric assessment, as Bénédicte's records show that she has a history of mental problems, suicide attempts and criminal behaviour. In despair, Sophie begs the lead detective on the case, Forgeat, to take her to a dentist as she believes this will reveal that work done on her teeth is not of French origin. At the dentist's office, Sophie manages to escape by grabbing a scalpel and forcing the detective to handcuff himself to a pipe. She then grabs his gun, and Bénédicte's file, and makes her escape. On the run, a desperate Sophie hijacks a car and forces the driver, to hand over their credit card and PIN. She then drives off and eventually dumps the car, and withdraws money from the bank account.

Meanwhile, in Montreal, a woman wearing a headscarf and sunglasses arrives on a flight from Paris. Later, detectives question this woman, but she says she is Sophie Malaterre and they believe her.

Back in Paris, Detective Forgeat interviews Bénédicte's mother. She identifies Sophie as her daughter, from a photo, and it becomes clear during the interview that Alice and her daughter were on bad terms. Before leaving, Forgeat surreptitiously takes some hair from Alice's hairbrush, for DNA.

Holed up in her hotel, Sophie is leafing through the file on Bénédicte Serteaux, looking for something that would link them. She calls her mother Marianne in Montreal and asks her to go to her house and try to find something that will prove her identity. When Marianne arrives at Sophie's house, she finds Thomas Huygens's severed head displayed on a pillow, surrounded by blood and candles, and with slogans daubed in blood on the wall. In a panic, Marianne tries to run, but is felled, and her throat cut, by a woman dressed in black. The mysterious woman then sets fire to the house and leaves.

The next day the manager of Sophie's hotel recognises her from TV news bulletins and calls the police. Forgeat arrives, with a fellow officer, and sees Sophie in the street. After a lengthy chase, Sophie reaches a busy road, steals a man's motorbike, and rides off. By this time, Montreal police have also gone to the house of Claire Marras, and find her lying dead, with her throat cut, in a blood filled bath. It is noted that Claire had paid a large sum of money into her bank account a few days previously.

At the Paris police headquarters, a DNA analysis of the headless corpse is made, and it is discovered that Thomas and Sophie are half-siblings. Forgeat interviews Thomas's parents and his mother explains that she was artificially inseminated, as her husband is sterile. Similarly, Benedicte's mother admits that she was also artificially inseminated, as she and her husband were not genetically compatible.

Finding herself once again with nowhere to go, Sophie calls Kourosh, who invites her to stay at his apartment. She tells him the whole story, and he appears sympathetic, but later she hears him on the phone and realises he is in league with Bénédicte. She manages to escape from the apartment, but Kourosh pursues her. During the chase, he falls from a balcony into the street and dies.

By now, Detective Forgeat has managed to piece everything together. When Sophie's parents lived in Paris they were desperately hard up, and her father sold his sperm for extra cash. He thus unknowingly became the father of both Thomas and Bénédicte. Bénédicte, under an assumed name, took a job at the laboratory in question and discovered the facts about her parentage.

Sophie returns to Bénédicte's flat to look for clues, but Bénédicte is there and attacks her. Sophie runs off and calls Forgeat, but she has been followed by Bénédicte, who overpowers her and knocks her out.

When Sophie wakes, she is at the laboratory in chains. Bénédicte tells her that she had the worst childhood imaginable, with a mother who hated her, and when she found out who her biological father's other children were, she decided to punish them for having been happy when she was not. Bénédicte had cosmetic surgery to look more like Sophie, and she employed Claire Marras, who was a computer expert, to create the Switch website. Claire also deleted the website afterwards, along with Sophie's flight details. Bénédicte is about to kill the hysterical Sophie when Forgeat and his men arrive and shoot Bénédicte dead.

Forgeat comforts the traumatised Sophie, reassuring her that he knows everything and that she is finally safe.

== Cast ==
- Karine Vanasse as Sophie Malaterre
- Eric Cantona as Damien Forgeat
- Mehdi Nebbou as Stéphane Defer
- Aurélien Recoing as Delors
- Niseema Theillaud as Alice Serteaux
- Karina Testa as Bénédicte Serteaux
- Bruno Todeschini as Verdier
- Stéphane Demers as Inspecteur Lachaux
- Stéphan Guérin-Tillié as Policeman
- Maxim Roy as Claire Marras

== Locations ==
- Paris
- Le Plessis-Robinson
- Montreal
