= Vanishing (2021 film) =

2022 French-Korean film by Denis Dercourt

- Promotional poster
- Hangul: 배니싱: 미제사건
- Lit.: Vanishing: Unsolved Case
- RR: Baenising: mije sageon
- MR: Paenising: mije sakŏn
- Directed by: Denis Dercourt
- Based on: The Killing Room by Peter May
- Starring: Yoo Yeon-seok; Olga Kurylenko
- Distributed by: Studio Santa Claus; JNC Media Group
- Release dates: October 7, 2021 (Busan); March 30, 2022 (South Korea); April 5, 2022 (France)
- Running time: 88 minutes
- Countries: South Korea; France
- Languages: Korean; French

Vanishing (Korean: 배니싱: 미제사건; lit. 'Vanishing: Unsolved Case') is a 2021 crime-mystery film directed by Denis Dercourt, starring Yoo Yeon-seok and Olga Kurylenko. It was released theatrically on March 30, 2022.

== Synopsis ==
One day, a severely damaged and unknown corpse is discovered. Jin-ho (Yoo Yeon-seok), the detective in charge of the case seeks advice from an international forensic scientist, Alice (Olga Kurylenko) to determine the identity of the corpse. Alice restores the missing traces through cutting-edge technology, and Jin-ho uses clues to intuit that it is not just a murder case, but has a close relationship with an organ trafficking organization. Two people working together to uncover the truth of the case, face the identity of an international criminal organization, and the truth of a shocking and gruesome incident is revealed. Everything disappears for a reason!

== Cast ==
- Yoo Yeon-seok as Park Jin-ho
- Olga Kurylenko as Alice
- Choi Moo-sung as 'the delivery man'
- Ye Ji-won as Im-sook, interpreter of Alice
- Lee Seung-joon as Dr. Lee
- Park So-yi as Yoon-ah, Jin-ho's niece
- Sung Ji-ru as Detective Jae-yeong
- Anupam Tripathi as a foreign broker.
- Michael Lee as a father who manages a large organized crime to save his son.

== Production ==
Early working title of the movie was Silent Morning (Korean: 고요한 아침) (French: Matin Calme).

Initially, the filming was scheduled to start in Korea in April 2020 but the filming schedule was postponed after Olga Kurylenko was diagnosed with COVID-19 in March. Finally, filming began in September 2020. It was filmed in Myeong-dong and Namdaemun in South Korea.

Online press conference was held on March 8, 2022.

== Release ==
Vanishing premiered at 26th Busan International Film Festival in October 2021. It was released in theaters on March 30, 2022.
