= Tomorrow at Dawn =

2009 film

- French theatrical release poster
- Directed by: Denis Dercourt
- Written by: Denis Dercourt; Jacques Sotty
- Produced by: Michel Saint-Jean
- Starring: Vincent Perez; Jérémie Renier; Françoise Lebrun; Gérald Laroche; Anne Marivin
- Cinematography: Rémy Chevrin
- Edited by: Yannick Kergoat
- Music by: Jérôme Lemonnier
- Production company: Diaphana Films
- Release dates: May 2009 (Cannes); 12 August 2009 (France)
- Running time: 100 minutes
- Country: France
- Language: French
- Budget: $5 million
- Box office: $495,000

Tomorrow at Dawn (French: Demain dès l'aube) is a 2009 French drama film directed by Denis Dercourt. It competed in the Un Certain Regard section at the 2009 Cannes Film Festival.

== Cast ==
- Vincent Perez as Mathieu
- Jérémie Renier as Paul
- Aurélien Recoing as Capitaine Déprées
- Anne Marivin as Jeanne
- Françoise Lebrun as Claire Guibert
- Gérald Laroche as Major Rogart
- Barbara Probst as Christelle
- Béatrice Agenin as The Duchess
