= Jean-Pierre Martins =

French actor and musician (born 1971)

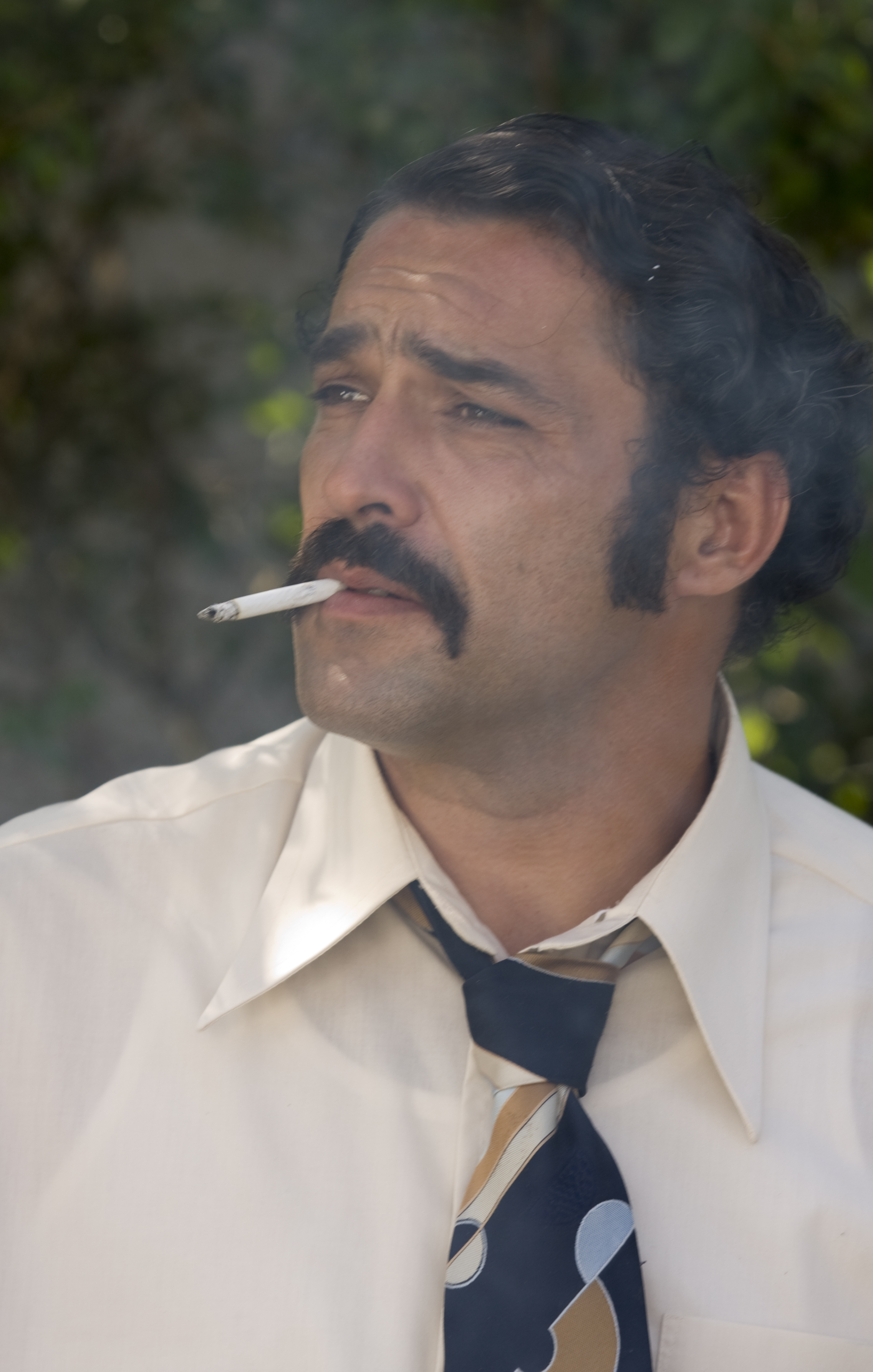
- Born: 29 October 1971 (age 54)
- Occupations: Actor, musician

Jean-Pierre Martins (born 29 October 1971) is a French actor and musician. He is known for playing the French boxer Marcel Cerdan in La Vie en rose (2007).

== Life and career ==
In 2007, he played the French boxer Marcel Cerdan on Édith Piaf's biopic La Vie en rose, co-starring Marion Cotillard as Piaf.

In 2009, he played the lead role in the Gregoire Sivan monster film King Crab Attack and in the thriller films The Beast (La bête) and La Horde. In July 2009, he was cast for the French drama film Pieds Nus sur les Limaces and played alongside Diane Kruger.

He is part of the rock band Silmarils. He plays the saxophone.

== Filmography ==
=== Film ===
- Laisse tes mains sur mes hanches (2003)
- Empire of the Wolves (2005)
- Opération Turquoise (2007)
- La Vie en rose (2007)
- Mes stars et moi (2008)
- Coluche, l'histoire d'un mec (2008)
- Le syndrome de Stockholm (2008)
- The Beast (La bête) (2009)
- La horde (2009)
- Papi Noël (2009)
- Blackout (2009)
- Palizzi (2009)
- Gamines (2009)
- Calzone (2009)
- Commis d'office (2009)
- 600 kg d'or pur (2010)
- Pieds nus sur les limaces (2010)
- Thelma, Louise et Chantal (2010)
- Felina and the Master of Darkness (2011)
- The Gilded Cage (2013)
- My Donkey, My Lover & I (2020)

=== Television ===
- Écrire pour un chanteur (2009)
- Republican Gangsters (2016) - 1 Episode
- Santa Bárbara (2016)
- Amor Maior (2016)
