= The Key (2007 film) =

- Film poster
- French: La Clef
- Directed by: Guillaume Nicloux
- Written by: Guillaume Nicloux; Pierre Trividic
- Produced by: Frédéric Bourboulon; Philippe Rousselet; Étienne Comar
- Starring: Guillaume Canet; Marie Gillain; Vanessa Paradis; Josiane Balasko; Thierry Lhermitte; Jean Rochefort; Françoise Lebrun
- Cinematography: Christophe Offenstein
- Edited by: Guy Lecorne
- Production company: Les Films de la Suane
- Distributed by: SND Films
- Release date: 19 December 2007
- Running time: 115 minutes
- Country: France
- Language: French
- Budget: $6.3 million
- Box office: $3.4 million

The Key (French: La Clef) is a 2007 French thriller film directed by Guillaume Nicloux.

== Plot ==
Eric Vincent is in his thirties and lives an uneventful life with his wife Audrey. They are talking about having a child. Eric is contacted by a friend of his biological father he never knew about the latter's death. Eric can come and collect his father's ashes. He is reluctant but then accepts.

== Cast ==
- Guillaume Canet as Éric Vincent
- Marie Gillain as Audrey
- Vanessa Paradis as Cécile
- Josiane Balasko as Michèle Varin
- Thierry Lhermitte as François Maneri
- Jean Rochefort as Joseph Arp
- Françoise Lebrun as Florence Arp
- Maria Schneider as Solange
- Pascal Bonitzer as Jean
- Marina de Van as Sophie
- Yves Verhoeven as Pujol
- Laure Marsac as Florence
- Michaël Abiteboul as Thierry
- Gilles Cohen as Larue
- Hélène Alexandridis as Muriel
- Jean-Louis Coulloc'h as Worzik
- Nicolas Jouhet as Ariel Bessy
- Sylvain Creuzevault as Greg
- Luc Schwarz as Luc
- Mathieu Nicourt as Christophe
- Martial Bezot as Simon
- Olivier Rabourdin as The tattooist

== Production ==
The Key closes the dark and complex detective trilogy of William Nicloux. We find in this film, in supporting roles populating the parallel plots that Eric Vincent (Guillaume Canet), the characters of François Maneri (Thierry Lhermitte), the investigator of a private matter, Une affaire privée, and Michèle Varin (Josiane Balasko), the police captain in That Woman, the second part.
