= Crime Scenes =

- Directed by: Frédéric Schoendoerffer
- Written by: Frédéric Schoendoerffer
- Produced by: Éric Névé
- Starring: Charles Berling; André Dussollier
- Cinematography: Jean-Pierre Sauvaire
- Edited by: Dominique Mazzoleni
- Music by: Bruno Coulais
- Distributed by: Rézo Films
- Release date: 15 March 2000
- Running time: 1h 40min
- Country: France
- Language: French
- Budget: $3.5 million
- Box office: $1.6 million

Crime Scenes (French: Scènes de crimes) is a 2000 French crime film directed by Frédéric Schoendoerffer.

== Cast ==
- Charles Berling - Fabian
- André Dussollier - Gomez
- Ludovic Schoendoerffer - Léon
- Pierre Mottet - François
- Éva Darlan - Inspector
- Camille Japy - Clara
- Élodie Navarre - Marie Bourgoin
- Hubert Saint-Macary - M. Bourgoin
- Blanche Ravalec - Madame Bourgoin
- Yan Epstein - Commandant Jaoui
- Frédérique Cantrel - The sonographer
- Serge Riaboukine - The priest
