= Claire Clouzot =

French journalist and film director (1933–2020)

- Born: 2 August 1933; Paris, France
- Died: 2 February 2020 (aged 86)
- Occupation: Director

Claire Clouzot (2 August 1933 – 2 February 2020) was a French film director and journalist.

== Biography ==
Clouzot was the daughter of photographer Rémy Duval and the granddaughter of director Henri-Georges Clouzot. She worked as a photographer and journalist before she began directing in 1980, with the film L’Homme Fragile, starring Richard Berry, Françoise Lebrun, and Didier Sauvegrain.

Clouzot was a delegate at International Critics' Week from 2002 to 2004 when the films Reconstruction and Or (My Treasure) won the Camera d'Or.

=== Death ===
She died on 2 February 2020, aged 86.

== Filmography ==
- L'homme en question (1976)
- L'Homme Fragile (1981)
- Rémy Duval, 28 place des Vosges (1986)

== Publications ==
- Le Cinéma français depuis la Nouvelle Vague (1972)
- Autobiographie d'une pionnière du cinéma, 1873-1968, Alice Guy (1978)
- Catherine Breillat. Indécence et pureté (2004)
- La Saga des Clouzot et le cinéma (2007)
