= Holiday (2010 film) =

- Film poster
- Directed by: Guillaume Nicloux
- Written by: Guillaum Nicloux; Nathalie Leuthreau; Jean-Bernard Pouy
- Produced by: Sylvie Pialat
- Starring: Jean-Pierre Darroussin; Judith Godrèche; Josiane Balasko
- Cinematography: Georges Lechaptois
- Edited by: Guy Lecorne
- Music by: Julien Doré
- Production company: Les Films du Worso
- Distributed by: MK2 Diffusion
- Release date: 8 December 2010
- Running time: 90 minutes
- Country: France
- Language: French
- Budget: $2.6 million
- Box office: $530.000

Holiday is a 2010 French comedy crime film directed by Guillaume Nicloux.

== Plot ==
One evening, Michel Trémois falls in the pharmacy of a provincial railway station and remembers the sequence of events which, in two days, have pushed his party life weekend with his wife Nadine, to rebuild their relationship and save their sexuality. Nothing goes as planned. After a wild and tumultuous night embellished singular encounters, the wake-Michel is brutal and painful. He not only finds himself accused of murder but his wife is not found.

== Cast ==
- Jean-Pierre Darroussin as Michel Trémois
- Judith Godrèche as Nadine Trémois
- Josiane Balasko as Christiane Mercier
- Françoise Lebrun as Marie-Paule
- Biyouna as Eva Lopez
- Pascal Bongard as Richard Ponce
- Marc Rioufol as Anthony Rivière
- Scali Delpeyrat as Fabien
- Eric Naggar as M. Abraham
- Yves Verhoeven as Inspector Delteil
- Camille de Sablet as Sandy
- Stéphan Wojtowicz as Sylvain Caccia
- Nicolas Jouhet as Olivier Desanti
- Christian Drillaud as Alain
- Yveline Hamon as Danielle
- Christophe Fluder as Nicolas Ajuria
- Léna Breban as Julie Vadec
- Valérie Lang as Catherine Bazinsky
- Maxime Lefrançois as Rémi Van Groll
- Julien Prévost as Bruno

== Production ==
Filming locations included the Château de Mercuès in Mercuès and the Gare de Cahors in Cahors, in the Lot department.
