= Jean-Jacques Grand-Jouan =

French actor (1949–2020)

- Born: 5 October 1949; Nantes, France
- Died: 27 October 2020 (aged 71); Paris, France
- Occupations: Actor; Director

Jean-Jacques Grand-Jouan (5 October 1949 – 27 October 2020) was a French film actor, director, producer, and screenwriter. In 1974, he became a resident of the French Academy in Rome, where he was the first filmmaker.

== Actor ==
=== Cinema ===
- Solveig et le violon turc (1977)
- Un bruit qui court (1983)
- Thank You Satan (1989)

=== Television ===
- Deuil en vingt-quatre heures (1982)
- De bien étranges affaires (1982)
- Série noire (1986)
- Julien Fontanes, magistrat (1988)
- Les Lutteurs immobiles (1988)
- Navarro (1993)
- L'Empire du Tigre : fumeur d'opium (2005)

== Producer ==
- Rue du Pied de Grue (1979)

== Director ==
- Solveig et le violon turc (1977)
- Rue du Pied de Grue (1979)
- Debout les crabes, la mer monte ! (1983)
- Lucifer et moi (2009)

== Screenwriter ==
- Rue du Pied de Grue (1979)
- Debout les crabes, la mer monte ! (1983)

== Theatre ==
- Service du nuit at the Théâtre Gramont (1968)
