= 13 Tzameti =

2005 thriller film by Géla Babluani

- Theatrical release poster
- Directed by: Géla Babluani
- Written by: Géla Babluani
- Produced by: Géla Babluani
- Starring: Georges Babluani; Pascal Bongard; Aurélien Recoing
- Cinematography: Tariel Meliava
- Edited by: Noémie Moreau
- Music by: East
- Distributed by: Palm Pictures
- Release dates: September 1, 2005 (Venice); February 8, 2006 (France)
- Running time: 95 minutes
- Country: France
- Languages: French; Georgian
- Budget: $1.6 million
- Box office: $795,223

13 Tzameti is a 2005 French suspense thriller film written, produced, and directed by Georgian filmmaker Géla Babluani. "Tzameti" (ცამეტი; tsameti) is the Georgian word for thirteen. 13 Tzameti is the feature-length directorial debut for Babluani. It also marks the acting debut of his younger brother Georges, who plays the film's protagonist Sébastien. The music was composed by East (Arnaud Taillefer) from the French band Troublemakers.

The film tells the story of a destitute immigrant worker who steals an envelope containing instructions for a mysterious job that could pay out a fortune. Following the instructions, the young man unwittingly becomes trapped in a dark and dangerous situation.

== Plot ==
The film follows 22-year-old Sébastien, a Georgian immigrant living in France and working construction jobs to support his poor family. Sébastien works on the home of Godon, a feeble morphine addict who is under police surveillance. After Godon dies of an overdose, his widow informs Sébastien that she is unable to pay him. Sébastien then overhears the widow talking with one of Godon's friends, describing a mysterious "job" that Godon had lined up before his death. The destitute Sébastien steals an envelope containing the instructions for the job. The police begin following Sébastien as he uses the train ticket contained in the envelope.

The police lose track of Sébastien as he follows the instructions and is brought to a secluded house in a forest. At the house, a deadly gambling event is being organized by a powerful criminal. Though Sébastien's contacts immediately recognize that he is not Godon and has no idea what he is getting into, they force him to participate in the game. Thirteen men identified by number must undergo a series of Russian roulette games, arranging themselves into a circle and pointing their revolver at the man in front of them. Spectators place bets on who will survive. Sébastien, as #13, survives the first round and fires his gun only after threatened with death. On the second round, in which two bullets are placed in each gun, Sébastien survives only because the man behind him is killed before he could fire. On the third round, with three bullets in each gun, Sebastien survives along with three other men.

Though he believes that he is finished, Sébastien is selected for the final "duel" game against #6, a cruel man who is managed by his own brother. Sébastien wins the duel and survives the game. He collects €850,000 out of the winnings his handlers have made from him, then flees the house. Fearing for his life, he sends the money home in a parcel before the police catch up with him. He tells the detective that he was turned away from the game and received no money, but gives the license plate number of a particularly unpleasant gambler in attendance. The police release him, but the brother of #6 spots him as he boards a train. The brother shoots Sébastien and steals his empty satchel. Sébastien collapses into a seat as the train begins to move.

== Cast ==
- George Babluani as Sébastien
- Aurélien Recoing as Jacky
- Pascal Bongard as Le maître de cérémonie
- Fred Ulysse as Alain
- Nicolas Pignon as Le parrain
- Vania Vilers as Mr. Schlondorff
- Philippe Passon as Jean François Godon
- Olga Legrand as Mme Godon
- Augustin Legrand as José
- Jo Prestia as Pierre Bléreau
- Joseph Malerba as The accountant
- Urbain Cancelier as Train controller

== Reception ==
As of October 2023, the film holds an 83% approval rating on Rotten Tomatoes, based on 66 reviews with an average rating of 7 out of 10. The website's critics consensus reads: "This starkly minimalist nail-biter of a thriller relentlessly builds up the tension and keeps the audience guessing."

== Awards ==
The film won the World Cinema Jury Prize at the 2006 Sundance Film Festival. It also won two awards at the 62nd Venice Film Festival.

== Remake ==
There is an American remake in color of the film, but Babluani intended to "change a lot of the storyline" to avoid merely reshooting the original film. The film stars Mickey Rourke, Ray Winstone, Jason Statham, Sam Riley, and 50 Cent.

== See also ==
- Intacto
- Luck (2009 film)

Awards
Preceded by The Forest for the Trees	Grand Jury Prize: World Cinema Dramatic; 2006	Succeeded by Sweet Mud
