= Tiziano Fratus =

Italian poet and publisher

Tiziano Fratus (born 1975 in Bergamo) is an Italian poet and publisher.

== Work ==
He wrote the poetic and dramatic cycle The Molossus (2000–2005) comprising the monologue in verse autumn for eleni, the collection of poems lumina, the long dramatic poem the inquisition, the prison poem the cry, the collection shipwreck at times of colonies. Autumn for eleni (2002) was staged in Turin Velan Center and Arezzo Wave. The Molossus is published in 2007 as a long modern poem divided into 52 bocche or mouthes. Fratus directed the videopoems into the man (2004) presented in Genoa International Poetry Festival, in Rome Contemporary Art Museum (Macro), catalogued in the Scottish Poetry Library in Edinburgh and in Poets House in New York, and the slogger (2005) presented in Parco Poesia in Riccione and Ars Poetica in Bratislava.

He won the XII Poetry Biennial in Alessandria. He collaborated with the theatre company OzooNo on the production V, which was part of the 2005–2006 season at Turin’s Teatro Stabile. His work A Inquisição was translated into Portuguese and presented at Casa Fernando Pessoa in Lisbon, and also translated into French and performed in Paris. His poetry has been translated, published, and/or performed in English, French, Portuguese, Slovak, Polish, German, Spanish, and Japanese.

He has edited essays on contemporary Italian theatre and drama, as well as collections of conversations with artists and writers. He has worked as a freelancer for Outis – National Centre for Contemporary Drama in Milan, and has given lecture tours throughout Europe.

He has lived in several cities, including Turin, Venice, and Milan, where he directed the cultural observatory ManifatturAE. He currently directs the contemporary theatre season Dissection at Teatro Fondamenta Nuove in Venice and the Torino Poesia Festival in Turin.

In 2006, he published the short poetry collection torsion presented at Turin Gay Pride 2006 and the long collection i kiss your scars. In March 2008 he published a new collection of poems, Flesh Gospel that he presented all around Italy (Turin, Milan, Genoa, Venice, Rome, XXI Turin International Bookfier) and in Europe; his poems will be published on French magazines Les Citadelles in Paris, Frau und Hunt in Germany, DiVersos in Portugal, on polish literature review Studium, ion the Literary Review Singapore, in Hong Kong' mag Softblow. In 2007, he founds the independent poetry press Edizioni Torino Poesia.

In autumn 2008, Swiss publisher Edizioni Le Ricerche published the bilingual anthology Italian/French Poésies murmurées sur la berge du Pô. Six poètes de Turin Poésie, presented in Paris (in collaboration with the review Borborygmes), in Montepellier (Salon du Livre 2009) and in Marseille (Italian Institute of Culture); the independent American publisher Farfalla Press published Fratus's poem A Room in Jerusalem touring the US in New York (Bowery Poetry Club), Burlington (University of Vermont) and Chicago (TH!NK art gallery, in collaboration with The Poetry Center), the bilingual anthologies Italian/English Double Skin (Ethos Books, Singapore, edited with Alvin Pang) and 5PX2 (Edinburgh, present in April 2009 at the Italian Cultural Institute, in collaboration with The Scottish Poetry Library).

In 2010 a selection of his poetry was translated into English by Francesco Lavato, executive director of the Poetry Center in Chicago, and published in the volume Creaturing presented in New York (Columbia University, Bowery Poetry Club), Minneapolis (Open Book), St Paul (Macalester College), Chicago (University of Illinois, Istituto Italiano di Cultura), Grosse Pointe / Detroit (Ewald Library), San Diego (San Diego State University) and Santa Crux (Felik Kulpa Art Gallery).

== Bibliography ==
=== Poetry ===
a inquisiçao long poem (2004)

Double Skin. New Poetry Voices from Italy and Singapore bilingual anthology (2009)

5PX2. Five Italian Poets and Five Scottish Poets bilingual anthology (2009)

Viaggio in Italia. Ocho poetas italianos contemporaneos bilingual anthology (2009)

Creaturing. Selected Poems bilingual volume (2010)

=== Theatre and Drama ===
Lo spazio aperto conversations (2002)

L'architettura dei fari essay (2003)

Os teatros que vem de Italia anthology (2004)

Salmagundi by Marco Martinelli play (2004)

Studi per esseri umani. Il teatro di Peter Asmussen plays anthology (2005)

Teatro di Stefano Angelucci Marino plays anthology (2006)
