= Thalasso (film) =

- Theatrical release poster
- Directed by: Guillaume Nicloux
- Screenplay by: Guillaume Nicloux
- Produced by: Sylvie Pialat; Benoît Quainon
- Starring: Michel Houellebecq; Gérard Depardieu
- Cinematography: Christophe Offenstein
- Edited by: Guy Lecorne
- Production companies: Les Films du Worso; Wild Bunch
- Distributed by: Wild Bunch
- Release date: 21 August 2019
- Running time: 93 minutes
- Country: France
- Language: French

Thalasso is a 2019 French comedy film directed by Guillaume Nicloux, starring the writer Michel Houellebecq and the actor Gérard Depardieu as fictionalized versions of themselves. It places Houellebecq at a health spa where he goes through a series of treatments while Depardieu keeps him company. The film has been described as a sequel to Nicloux's The Kidnapping of Michel Houellebecq (2014).

== Plot ==
The film is set at a centre for seawater therapy in Cabourg. The writer Michel Houellebecq goes through a series of treatments offered at the health spa. He is accompanied by the actor Gérard Depardieu.

== Cast ==
- Michel Houellebecq as Michel Houellebecq
- Gérard Depardieu as Gérard Depardieu
- Maxime Lefrançois as Maxine
- Mathieu Nicourt as Mathieu
- Luc Schwarz as Luc
- Françoise Lebrun as Herself

== Production ==
Guillaume Nicloux had previously made multiple films where the writer Michel Houellebecq appears as an actor as well as several films featuring Gérard Depardieu. Notably, he made The Kidnapping of Michel Houellebecq (2014), where Houellebecq performs as a version of himself. Although Thalasso has been described as a sequel to The Kidnapping of Michel Houellebecq, Nicloux says it was not conceived as such and is a standalone work. He says it did not begin with the idea of creating an encounter between Houellebecq and Depardieu, but with a screenplay he wrote that had "a particularity" in that the main characters are played by themselves. Houellebecq and Depardieu did not know each other before but responded positively when Nicloux told them he planned to create an encounter between them within a fictional story. The film also features Maxime Lefrançois, Mathieu Nicourt and Luc Schwarz, who played the abductors in the 2014 film and reprise their roles.

The scenes were filmed in one take with a multiple-camera setup.

In November 2026, it was revealed that an actress had filed a complaint the previous year accusing Depardieu and Houellebecq of rape and sexual assault, and Nicloux of complicity. The actress alleged that while filming a partially improvised scene that involved drinking alcohol, she had been sexually abused by Depardieu and Houellebecq, while Nicloux filmed. Nicloux denied that any abuse had occurred.

== Release ==
The release in France was on 21 August 2019 and distributed by Wild Bunch. The film was shown at festivals in 2019 and 2020, including in the official competition of the 2019 San Sebastián International Film Festival.

== Reception ==
Jordan Mintzer of The Hollywood Reporter described it as a sequel to The Kidnapping of Michel Houellebecq and said you need to see the first film for Thalasso to fully make sense. Mintzer said Thalasso is less amusing than the first film and has "a plot so thin you can barely see it".
