= That Woman (2003 film) =

2003 film

- Film poster
- Directed by: Guillaume Nicloux
- Written by: Guillaume Nicloux
- Produced by: Frédéric Bourboulon; Agnès Le Pont
- Starring: Josiane Balasko
- Cinematography: Pierre-William Glenn
- Edited by: Guy Lecorne
- Music by: Éric Demarsan; Fabio Viscogliosi
- Production company: Canal+
- Distributed by: TF1 Films International
- Release date: 15 October 2003
- Running time: 100 minutes
- Country: France
- Language: French
- Budget: $4.8 million
- Box office: $650.462

That Woman (original title: Cette femme-là) is a 2003 French drama film directed by Guillaume Nicloux. For this film, Josiane Balasko received her third nomination for the César Award for Best Actress.

== Plot ==
Woman cop, Michèle Varin can not forget the death of her son, February 29, despite medication, alcohol and psychotherapy. She spends her evenings doing puzzles, alone with her pet rabbit. Terrified, like every four years by the approach of a new February 29, it must investigate the murder of a woman found hanged in the forest. The starting point of an unforgettable intimate adventure.

== Cast ==
- Josiane Balasko as Michèle Varin
- Éric Caravaca as Sylvain Bazinsky
- Ange Rodot as Léo Kopmans
- Frédéric Pierrot as Daniel
- Thierry Lhermitte as François Manéri
- Pascal Bongard as Evens
- Corinne Debonnière as Catherine
- Alex Descas as Denis
- Valérie Donzelli as Claire Atken
- Aurélien Recoing as Man Identification
- Hammou Graïa as Doctor Borde
- Yann Goven as Sylvain's friend
- Eva Ionesco as Madame Kopmans
- Jean-Baptiste Malartre as Commissioner Fauler
- Nathalie Nerval as Mother Michèle
- Clément Thomas as Yvan Thiel

== Accolades ==
Award / Film Festival	Category	Recipients and nominees	Result
César Awards	Best Actress	Josiane Balasko	Nominated
