= Pascal Bongard =

Swiss film actor

Pascal Bongard is a Swiss film actor. He has appeared in more than forty films since 1984.

== FIlmography ==
Film
| Year | Title | Role | Notes |
|---|---|---|---|
| 2002 | Two | | |
| 2002 | Sentimental Destinies | | |
| 2002 | Carnage | | |
| 2003 | It's Easier for a Camel... | | |
| 2003 | That Woman | Evens | |
| 2005 | 13 Tzameti | | |
| 2005 | La Boîte noire | | |
| 2006 | The Untouchable | | |
| 2007 | Anna M. | | |
| 2007 | All is Forgiven | André | |
| 2010 | My Little Princess | | |
| 2010 | Holiday | Richard Ponce | |
| 2013 | The Nun | | |

TV
| Year | Title | Role | Notes |
|---|---|---|---|
| 2012 | Spiral | | |
