= Frédéric Schoendoerffer =

French film director and screenwriter

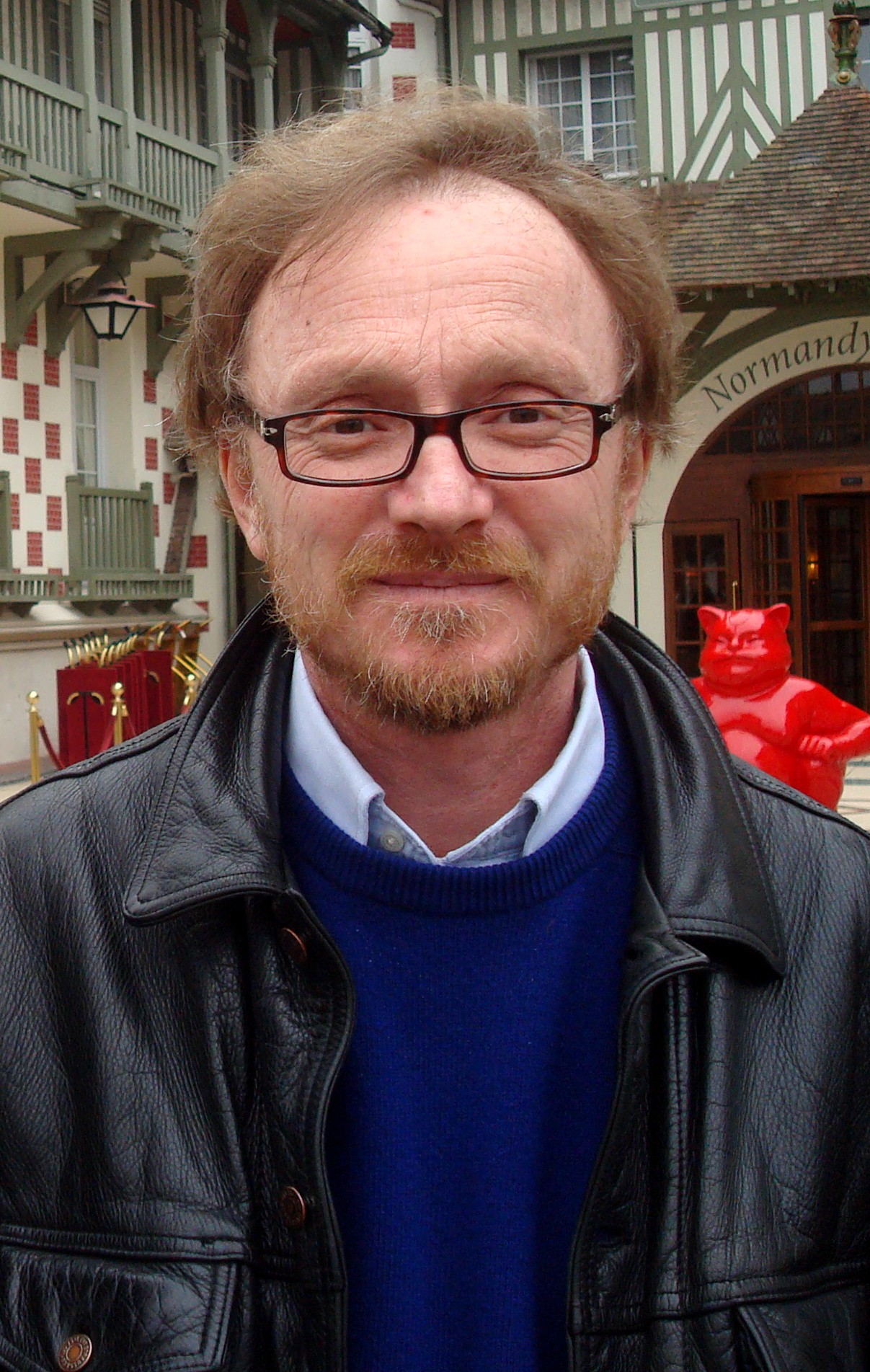
- Frédéric Schoendoerffer in 2010.
- Born: 3 October 1962 (age 63); Boulogne-Billancourt, France
- Occupation: Film director
- Years active: 1984-present

Frédéric Schoendoerffer (1962) is a French film director and screenwriter.

== Background ==
Frédéric Schoendoerffer was born on October 3, 1962. He is the son of Pierre Schoendoerffer and wife Patricia. His brother is director, producer, and actor Ludovic Schoendoerffer, and his sister is actress Amélie Schoendoerffer.

== Filmography ==
Year	Title	Role	Box office	Notes
1984	Emmanuelle 4	Production Manager	$9.6 million	Directed by Francis Leroi
1985	À nous les garçons	Assistant director	$7.6 million	Directed by Michel Lang
1992	Dien Bien Phu	Assistant director	$6.9 million	Directed by Pierre Schoendoerffer
1992	Sabine j'imagine	Assistant director		TV movie directed by Dennis Berry
1995	Le parasite	Assistant director		TV movie directed by Patrick Dewolf
1997	Le bonheur est un mensonge	Assistant director		TV movie directed by Patrick Dewolf (2)
2000	Crime Scenes	Director & writer	$1.6 million	Nominated - César Award for Best First Feature Film
2004	Secret Agents	Director & writer	$6.3 million	
2007	Paris Lockdown	Director, writer & Producer	$4.7 million	
2009	Braquo	Director		TV series (4 episodes)
2011	Switch	Director, writer & Producer	$3 million	
2014	96 hours	Director	$2.3 million	
2016	Le convoi	Director, writer & Producer	$1.1 million	
