= Denis Dercourt =

French film director

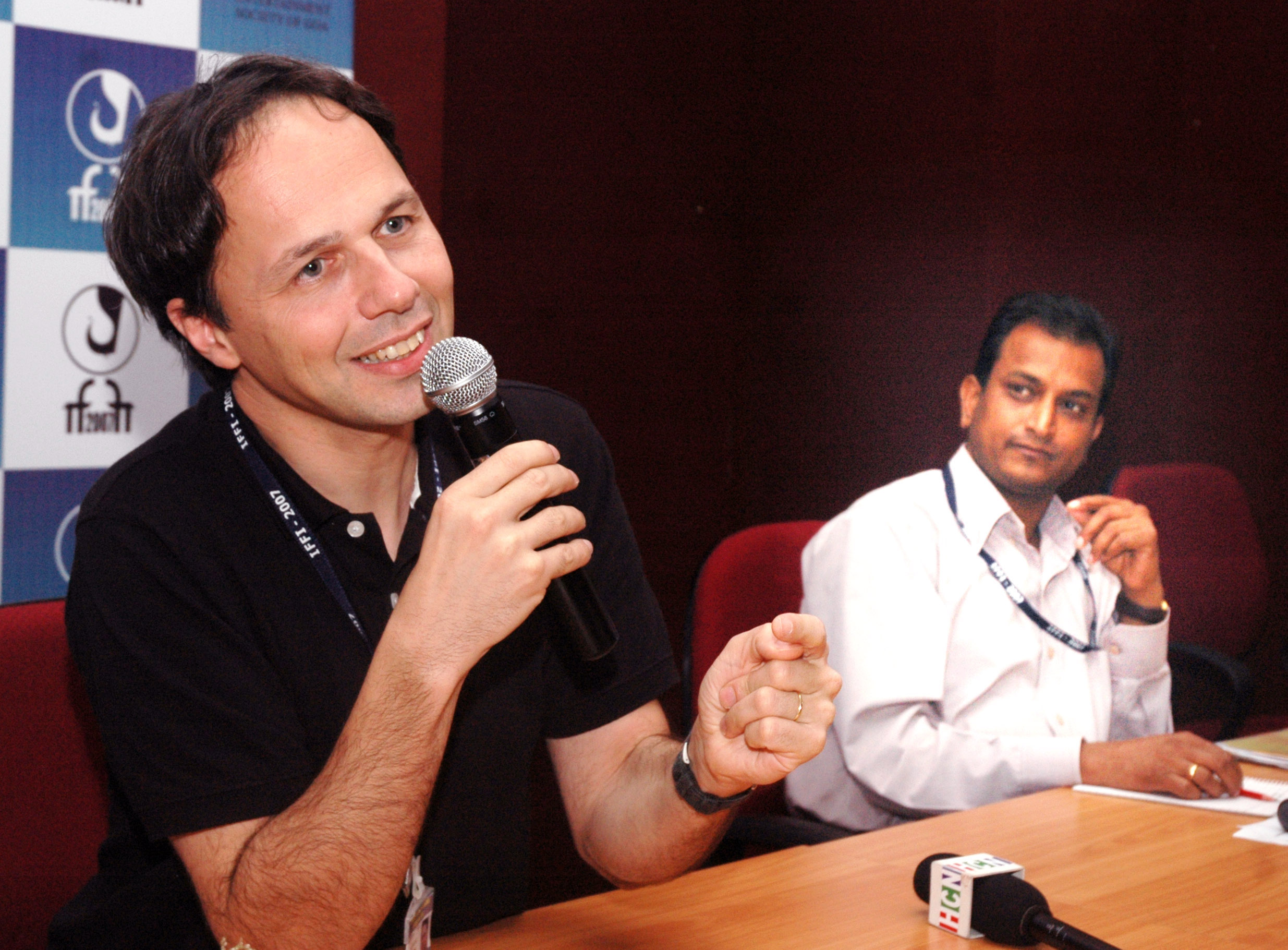
- Dercourt (left) at IFFI 2007
- Born: 1 October 1964 (age 61); Paris, France
- Occupations: Film director Screenwriter
- Years active: 1997-present

Denis Dercourt (French pronunciation: [dəni dɛʁkuʁ]; born 1 October 1964) is a French film director and screenwriter.

Denis Dercourt's grandfather directed documentaries; his father was a film producer and his brother is also a film producer. From 1988 to 1993, Dercourt studied philosophy at the Paris Nanterre University and also studied at Sciences Po.

Dercourt started his career as a singer and violin player. He performed with the French symphonic orchestra directed by Laurent Petitgirard and taught music at the Conservatoire de Strasbourg. He shot his first short film with his brother.

He has directed nine films since 1997. His film The Page Turner (La Tourneuse de pages) was screened in the Un Certain Regard section at the 2006 Cannes Film Festival. The $4.2 million (€3.07 million) film went on to become an international box office success, grossing $11.1 million worldwide.

Three years later, his film Demain dès l'aube competed in the same section at the 2009 festival.

In 2021, he shot the French-Korean film Vanishing based on the novel The Killing Room by Peter May.

== Filmography ==
Year	Title	Role	Notes
1997	Le déménagement	Director	
1998	Les cachetonneurs	Director & Writer	Nominated - Chicago International Film Festival - New Directors Competition
2000	Lise et André	Director & Writer	Avignon Film Festival - Prix SACD; Bergamo Film Meeting - Bronze Rosa Camuna; Nominated - Ghent International Film Festival - Grand Prix
2003	Mes enfants ne sont pas comme les autres	Director & Writer	
2006	The Page Turner	Director & Writer	Nominated - Globe de Cristal Award for Best Film
2009	Tomorrow at Dawn	Director & Writer	Nominated - Cannes Film Festival - Un Certain Regard
2013	La chair de ma chair	Director, Writer, Cinematographer, Editor, Producer & Sound	
2013	A Pact	Director & Writer	Nominated - Chicago International Film Festival - Audience Choice Award
2015	En équilibre	Director & Writer	
2022	Vanishing	Director & Writer	Korean-French Film
