= Guillaume Nicloux =

French novelist, director and actor (born 1966)

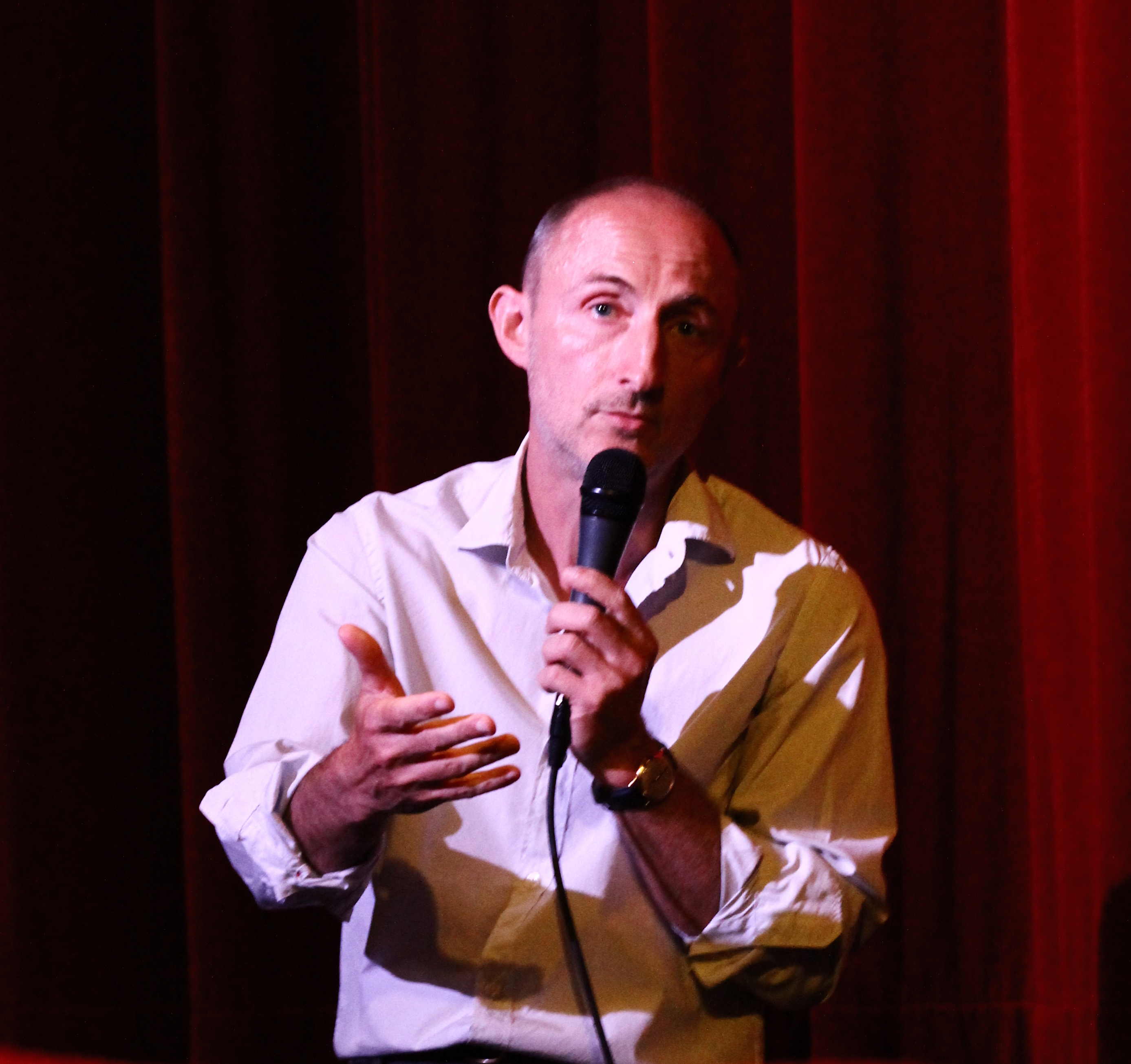
- Guillaume Nicloux in 2014
- Born: 3 August 1966 (age 60); France
- Occupation: Director

Guillaume Nicloux (French pronunciation: [ɡijom niklu]; born 3 August 1966) is a French novelist, director and actor.

== Biography ==
Nicloux is the founder of the theatre company La Troupe. He has written crime fiction and directed films for cinema and French television.

He won the Best Screenplay Award at the 2014 Tribeca Film Festival for The Kidnapping of Michel Houellebecq, a comedic interpretation of a rumoured abduction of the writer Michel Houellebecq, starring Houellebecq as himself.

His 2015 film Valley of Love, starring Gérard Depardieu and Isabelle Huppert, was selected to compete for the Palme d'Or at the 2015 Cannes Film Festival.

In 2019, he directed Thalasso, a sequel of sorts to The Kidnapping of Michel Houellebecq, where the author teamed up this time with Gérard Depardieu. In 2026, it was announced that an actress had filed a complaint for rape and sexual assault against Depardieu and Houellebecq, and for complicity against Nicloux, alleging that she had been abused by the former two while Nicloux filmed. Nicloux denied any wrongdoing.

== Bibliography ==
- Zoocity (1996)
- Le Saint des seins (1996)
- C'est juste une balade américaine (1997)
- Le Destin est une putain (1998)
- Jack Mongoly (1998)
- Monsieur Chance (1998)
- Le Poulpe, le film : pour l'attendrir, faut taper dessus (1998)
- L'Honneur perdu de Georges Blesse (2000)
- Des brutes et des méchants (2001)

== Filmography ==
Director

- Les Enfants volants (1990)
- La Vie crevée (1992, TV)
- Faut pas rire du bonheur (1994)
- Le Poulpe (1998)
- A Private Affair (2002)
- That Woman (2003)
- Le Concile de Pierre (2006)
- The Key (2007)
- La reine des connes (2009, TV)
- Virgin's Kiss (2009)
- Holiday (2010)
- L'Affaire Gordji : Histoire d'une cohabitation (2012, TV)
- The Nun (La Religieuse) (2013)
- The Kidnapping of Michel Houellebecq (L'Enlèvement de Michel Houellebecq) (2014)
- Valley of Love (2015)
- The End (2016)
- To the Ends of the World (2018)
- Thalasso (2019)
- Twice Upon a Time (2019)
- La Tour (2022)
- Being Blanche Houellebecq (Dans la peau de Blanche Houellebecq) - 2024

Actor

- I Stand Alone (Seul contre tous) (1998)
- Le Poulpe (1998)
- That Woman (2003)
- Cliente (2008)
- Turning Tide (2013)
