= Yann Gozlan =

French film director

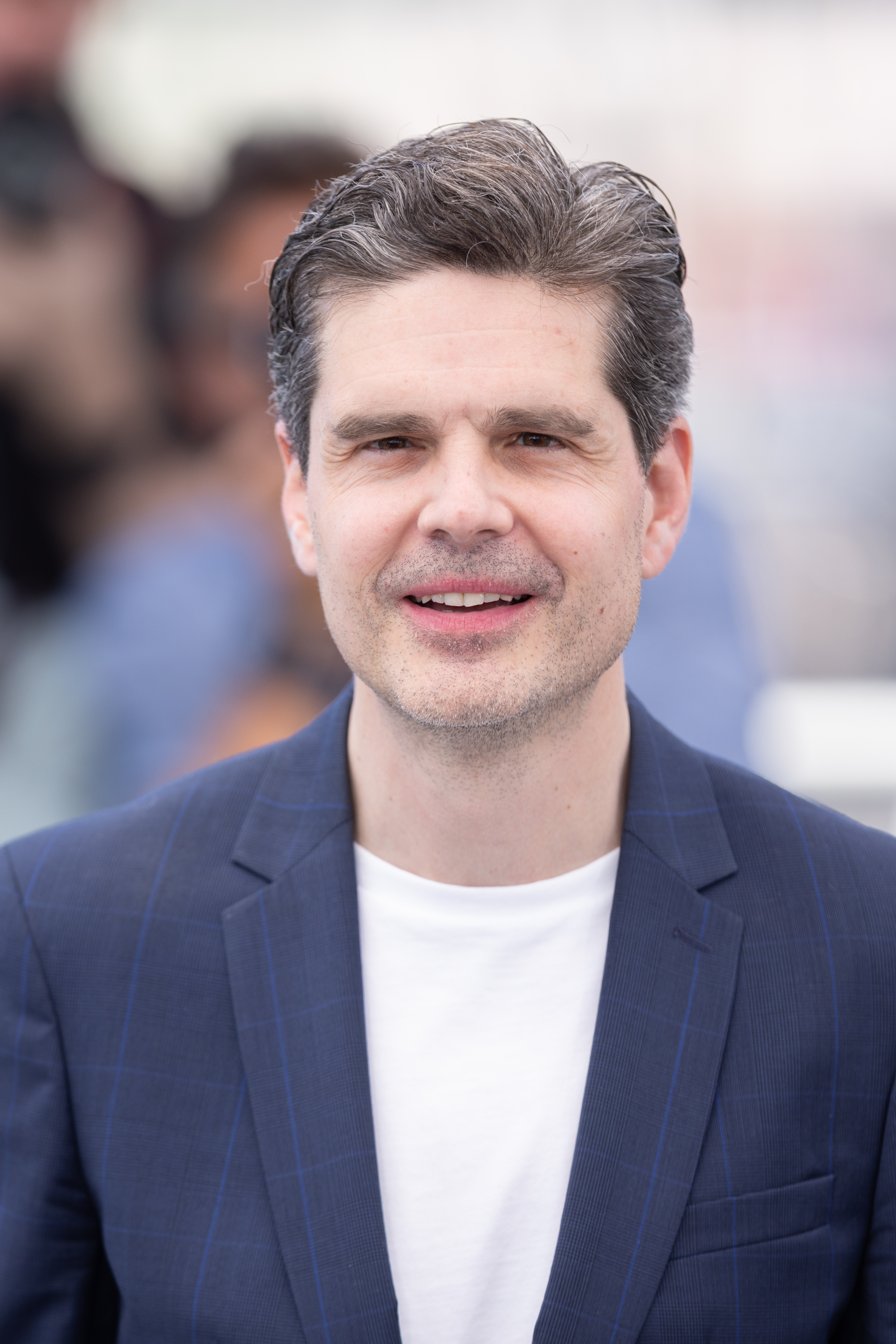
- Gozlan in 2025
- Born: 28 March 1977 (age 49); Aubervilliers, Île-de-France, France
- Occupations: Film director; screenwriter
- Years active: 2004–present

Yann Gozlan (French pronunciation: [jan ɡozlɑ̃]; born 28 March 1977) is a French film director and screenwriter. He has directed six feature films: the horror film Caged (2010), the thriller A Perfect Man (2015), the action thriller Burn Out (2017), the mystery thriller Black Box (2021), the psychological thriller Visions (2023), the AI-themed thriller The Residence (2025), and the psychological thriller Guru (2025).

== Early life ==
Gozlan, the son of an engineer father and a nurse mother, grew up in Aubervilliers.

== Career ==
After having shot experimental films on video and Super 8, Yann Gozlan went in search of a producer for his first short film Pellis. Completed in 2003, the film depicts the world of dermatology and psychosomatic disorders. Another short film, Écho, followed in 2006 with Lubna Azabal in the lead role as a pregnant woman suffering from tinnitus and feeling tormented by the unexplained noises of her apartment where she is a recluse. The film received the Prix du court métrage at the 2007 Fantastic'Arts festival in Gérardmer.

Gozlan was tapped by Sombrero Films to direct his feature film debut, Caged (Captifs), a horror film set against the backdrop of human organ trafficking. The film starred Zoé Félix in the main role. It was theatrically released in October 2010. The film won two awards the same year (Best Actress and Best Picture) at the Screamfest Horror Film Festival in Los Angeles.

In 2015, Gozlan continued his collaboration with screenwriter Guillaume Lemans, which began with the film Caged, on the film A Perfect Man (Un homme idéal), a thriller dealing with the spiral of lies and deception. The film was released in theaters in March 2015 with Pierre Niney in the lead role.

In 2017, collaborating again with Guillaume Lemans, he wrote and directed the action thriller Burn Out, based on the noir novel Balancé dans les cordes by Jérémie Guez. Combining Superbike motorcycle racing with drug trafficking in the city, the film was theatrically released in January 2018 with François Civil in the main role. In 2022, Borsalino Productions produced a remake of Burn Out entitled Centauro, directed by Spanish filmmaker Daniel Calparsoro.

Alongside his productions, Yann Gozlan collaborated with his friend Thomas Kruithof on the screenplay for La Mécanique de l'ombre, released in theaters in January 2017 and starring François Cluzet. The same year, alongside producer Wassim Béji, he became attached to Roman Polanski's Based on a True Story. An adaptation of the novel of the same name by Delphine de Vigan, the film was released in theaters in November 2017. It is a psychological thriller starring Emmanuelle Seigner and Eva Green. Gozlan served as associate producer of the film.

In 2021, Gozlan directed the mystery thriller Black Box (Boîte noire). The film stars Pierre Niney as Matthieu, a talented young black box analyst who is tasked with investigating a mysterious deadly plane crash. It was theatrically released in September 2021. Gozlan co-wrote the screenplay with Simon Moutaïrou and Nicolas Bouvet-Levrard. The trio received a nomination for Best Original Screenplay at the 47th César Awards. The film was a major success in France, where it sold 1.2 million admissions.

Gozlan's fifth film, Visions, is a psychological thriller starring Diane Kruger and Mathieu Kassovitz. Set in the south of France, Kruger stars as Estelle, an airline captain happily married to a doctor portrayed by Kassovitz. After a chance encounter with her ex Ana, Estelle has an affair. Estelle develops recurring visions, nightmares and hallucinations, which are intensifed when Ana disappears mysteriously. The film was theatrically released in September 2023.

Gozlan's sixth film, The Residence (Dalloway), was announced to wrap filming in August 2024. Gozlan co-wrote the screenplay with Nicolas Bouvet-Levrard and Thomas Kruithof, based on Tatiana de Rosnay's 2020 novel Flowers of Darkness (Les Fleurs de l'ombre). It stars Cécile de France as a writer who is assisted by an artificial intelligence system during a residency programme. Earlier in March 2024, it was announced that Gozlan would renuite with Pierre Niney for a film entitled Guru (Gourou), in which Niney portays a charismatic and manipulative self-help guru. Guru premiered in November 2025 at The American French Film Festival in Los Angeles, before being theatrically released in January 2026.

== Filmography ==
Year	Title	Director	Screenwriter	Notes
2004	Pellis	Yes	Yes	Short film
2006	Écho	Yes	Yes	Short film
2010	Caged	Yes	Yes	
2015	A Perfect Man	Yes	Yes	
2016	La Mécanique de l'ombre	No	Yes	
2017	Based on a True Story	No	No	Associate producer
2017	Burn Out	Yes	Yes	
2021	Black Box	Yes	Yes	
2023	Visions	Yes	Yes	
2025	The Residence	Yes	Yes	
2025	Guru	Yes	Yes	

== Accolades ==
Award	Date of ceremony	Category	Film	Result	Ref.
César Awards	25 February 2022	Best Original Screenplay (Shared with Simon Moutaïrou and Nicolas Bouvet-Levrard)	Black Box	Nominated	
