= Guru (2025 film) =

2025 film

- Theatrical release poster
- French: Gourou
- Directed by: Yann Gozlan
- Screenplay by: Yann Gozlan; Jean-Baptiste Delafon
- Produced by: Wassim Béji; Pierre Niney; Marc-Henri de Busschère
- Starring: Pierre Niney; Marion Barbeau; Anthony Bajon; Christophe Montenez; Holt McCallany
- Cinematography: Antoine Sanier
- Edited by: Grégoire Sivan
- Music by: Chloé Thévenin
- Production companies: WY Productions; Ninety Films; StudioCanal; M6 Films; Panache Productions; La Compagnie Cinématographique; BE TV and Orange; Proximus
- Distributed by: StudioCanal
- Release dates: 3 November 2025 (The American French Film Festival); 28 January 2026 (France); 28 January 2026 (Belgium)
- Running time: 124 minutes
- Countries: France; Belgium
- Language: French
- Budget: €12.5 million

Guru (French: Gourou) is a 2025 psychological thriller film directed by Yann Gozlan, from a screenplay he wrote with Jean-Baptiste Delafon. The film stars Pierre Niney as a charismatic and manipulative self-help guru. The supporting cast includes Marion Barbeau, Anthony Bajon and Holt McCallany. It is a co-production between France and Belgium.

The film had its world premiere at The American French Film Festival on 3 November 2025. It was theatrically released in France and Belgium on 28 January 2026.

== Cast ==
- Pierre Niney as Mathieu Vasseur
- Marion Barbeau as Adèle
- Anthony Bajon as Julien
- Christophe Montenez as Christophe Vasseur
- Holt McCallany as Peter Conrad

== Production ==
Guru was first announced on 15 March 2024. It is the seventh feature film by French director Yann Gozlan. He wrote the screenplay with Jean-Baptiste Delafon, with whom he previously collaborated on the psychological thriller Visions (2023). The films stars Pierre Niney as a charismatic personal development coach whose toxic behavior and abuse of power spirals into paranoia. For the role, Niney was inspired by Jake Gyllenhaal's character in Nightcrawler (2014) and Tom Cruise's character in Magnolia (1999). Other roles include Marion Barbeau, Anthony Bajon and Holt McCallany.

The film was produced by Wassim Béji at WY Productions and by Pierre Niney with Marc-Henri de Busschère through his company Ninety Films. It was co-produced by StudioCanal, M6 Films and the Belgian companies Panache Productions, La Compagnie Cinématographique, BE TV and Orange, and Proximus.. Principal photography began in November 2024 and concluded in February 2025. It was shot in Paris and its suburbs (Charles de Gaulle Airport), as well as in Las Vegas.

== Release ==
Guru had its world premiere at The American French Film Festival in Los Angeles, where it was screened as the closing film on 3 November 2025. International sales are handled by StudioCanal, which also theatrically released the film in France on 28 January 2026, with Anga Distribution simultaneously releasing the film in Belgium. In May 2025, the company presented the film at the Marché du Film in Cannes to be acquired by distributors around the world.
