= The Next Three Days =

2010 film by Paul Haggis

- Theatrical release poster
- Directed by: Paul Haggis
- Screenplay by: Paul Haggis
- Based on: Anything for Her by: Fred Cavayé; Guillaume Lemans
- Produced by: Michael Nozik; Olivier Delbosc; Paul Haggis; Marc Missonnier
- Starring: Russell Crowe; Elizabeth Banks; Brian Dennehy; Olivia Wilde; Liam Neeson
- Cinematography: Stéphane Fontaine
- Edited by: Jo Francis
- Music by: Danny Elfman
- Production companies: Lionsgate; Highway 61 Films; Fidélité Films
- Distributed by: Lionsgate
- Release dates: November 9, 2010 (New York City); November 19, 2010 (United States)
- Running time: 133 minutes
- Country: United States
- Language: English
- Budget: $30 million
- Box office: $67.5 million

The Next Three Days is a 2010 American action thriller film written and directed by Paul Haggis and starring Russell Crowe. A remake of the 2008 French film Pour elle (Anything for Her), the plot follows a husband who takes extreme measures to break his wife out of prison after she is wrongfully convicted of murder. Elizabeth Banks, Brian Dennehy, Olivia Wilde and Liam Neeson also star.

Filmed on location in Pittsburgh in late 2009, the film was theatrically released in the United States on November 19, 2010 by Lionsgate. It received mixed reviews from critics and grossed $68 million worldwide against a production budget of $30 million.

== Plot ==
In Pittsburgh, Pennsylvania, Lara Brennan is sentenced to life in prison for murder. Three years later, her young son Luke ceases to acknowledge her during prison visits, despite the efforts of her husband John. Following the failure of Lara's appeal, her lawyer urges John to accept the evidence: after a public fight with her boss, Lara was seen leaving the parking lot where her boss was bludgeoned with a fire extinguisher; though Lara claims to have bumped into the real suspect, her fingerprints were on the murder weapon and the victim's blood was found on her coat. Out of legal options, Lara attempts suicide, and John becomes determined to break her out of prison.

John consults former inmate Damon Pennington, who wrote a book about his seven prison escapes, and makes the necessary preparations over the next three months, studying the routines inside Allegheny County Jail. Attempting to buy fake passports from a drug dealer, he is directed to a bar where he is instead beaten and robbed by the dealer and his friend. A deaf motorcyclist from the bar later sells him the forged documents for $3,700, and John buys a handgun. Nearly caught testing a bump key inside the jail, a panicked John is seen vomiting outside by the detectives who arrested Lara; they follow him home, suspicious that he has sold the house and other assets. John learns how to break into the van for the medical lab that conducts Lara's diabetes tests.

Learning that Lara will be transferred to a high-security prison in three days, John is unable to close the house sale in time and prepares to rob a bank, but cannot go through with it, and nearly runs over a mother and her child in his stress. A visit with Lara leads to an argument and, in a fit of quiet rage, she declares she is guilty, but John refuses to believe her. He tails a local drug dealer to a meth lab, setting fire to the building and taking the cash at gunpoint, but a shoot-out leaves one of the criminals dead and a second wounded. John breaks his tail light as he drives the wounded dealer to a hospital, but the man bleeds out and dies, so John leaves his body at a bus stop. John's father finds his plane tickets and realizes his plan, and they share a final goodbye.

Setting his plan in motion, John cuts the medical lab's phone lines and plants falsified blood tests in the van indicating that Lara is in a state of hyperkalemia, before leaving Luke at a birthday party. With her doctor unable to contact the lab, Lara is transferred to a hospital. Detectives trace John's broken tail light while investigating the meth lab incident and break into his empty house, realizing he is planning to free his wife. At the hospital, John incapacitates Lara's guards and convinces her to escape with him. Confronted by the detectives, they manage to slip away into a crowd of Pittsburgh Penguins fans and board the subway. Detectives order the railway stations locked down. John pulls the emergency stop, and they evade police in a getaway car he had stashed nearby.

With Luke unexpectedly at the zoo for the birthday party, John realizes they have run out of time and turns onto the highway, saying they will find him later. Lara opens her car door, ready to fall onto the road and end their problems, but John narrowly saves her, and they risk retrieving Luke from the zoo. Picking up an elderly couple stranded at the train station for cover, they pass through the police checkpoint and drive the couple to Buffalo, New York. Reaching a Canadian airport, John, Lara, and Luke board a flight to Venezuela using their fake passports, while police are misled as to their destination by false clues John had left behind.

Investigators return to the scene of the murder and a flashback reveals Lara's innocence. Searching a nearby storm drain, one of the detectives just misses the button that could have substantiated Lara's alibi. At a hotel in Caracas, John takes a picture of his sleeping wife and son.

== Cast ==
- Russell Crowe as John Brennan
- Elizabeth Banks as Lara Brennan
- Brian Dennehy as George Brennan
- Lennie James as Lieutenant Nabulsi
- Olivia Wilde as Nicole
- Ty Simpkins as Luke Brennan
- Helen Carey as Grace Brennan
- Liam Neeson as Damon Pennington
- Daniel Stern as Meyer Fisk
- Kevin Corrigan as Alex Gaidar
- Jason Beghe as Detective Quinnan
- Aisha Hinds as Detective Collero
- Tyrone Giordano as Mike
- Jonathan Tucker as David
- Allan Steele as Sergeant Harris
- RZA as Mouss
- James Ransone as Harv
- Moran Atias as Erit
- Michael Buie as Mick Brennan
- Trudie Styler as Dr. Byrdie Lifson
- Nazanin Boniadi as Elaine
- Tyler M. Green and Toby J. Green as 3-year-old Luke
- Kaitlyn Wylde as Julie

== Development ==
Paul Haggis was developing a film about Martin Luther King but could not get the financing. He began looking for less expensive projects and came across the French film Pour Elle (Anything for Her) by Fred Cavayé.

The plot of Pour Elle involves a teacher, Julien (Vincent Lindon), whose wife (Diane Kruger) becomes a suspect in a murder investigation and is arrested; Julien does not believe that his wife is guilty of the crime, and attempts to remove her from the prison. Pour Elle was Cavayé's directing debut. The film was one of the main attractions of the Alliance Française French Film Festival in 2010. Cavayé explained the plot and motivation for making the film, "We wanted to make a real human story about an ordinary man doing an extraordinary thing because he's faced with a miscarriage of justice. The film also talks about courage—saying how you show courage depending on the situation. In France, for example, there were good people who did not go into the Resistance against the Germans."

Haggis later recalled, "I'd always wanted to do a little thriller. I'd always loved films like Three Days of the Condor, those romantic thrillers ... It's a lovely, slight, 90-minute film, the French film."

=== Changes from French film ===
Haggis made a number of key changes from the French film:

They made it quite clear from the beginning of the film, she was innocent, and that he was loving, and he'd do anything to get her out and, in the end, they lived happily ever after. The bumps along the way were good but I thought I could make him pay a larger price. So, the first thing I did was ask myself what the question was. I need to have a question if I'm starting a movie. The question I came up with, and I'm not sure if it's reflected in the film or not, but it's what I was writing toward, was: Would you save the woman you loved if you knew that by doing so you'd become someone she'd no longer love? That interested me. And that wasn't in the French film at all. The whole issue of innocence was fascinating to me because I didn't necessarily want to say whether she was guilty or innocent. I just wanted John to be the only one who believes she's innocent. The evidence is overwhelming. Even his parents think she's probably guilty. Even their own lawyer. Yet he still believed ... and what that level of belief does for someone, how infectious it is. So, those are two things I was playing with.

Cavayé told The Age regarding the remake of the film by Haggis, he is eager "to be a spectator of my own film". The director commented on the news his film would be remade by Haggis, "It's a strange feeling. I wrote this story in my very small apartment in Paris. When I saw my name next to Russell Crowe on the net, it was amazing."

Haggis based the lead character on himself:

I just sat down and said, "If I had to break the woman I love out of prison, how would I do it?" I'd go on the Internet, that's the first thing I do. I'd Google "How to break out of prison." So, that's exactly what I did. I went on and Googled "How to break out of prison", "How to break into a car", and found these fascinating things, and I just used them. I figured that's what he would do. I also knew I would fail spectacularly, at least at first. But then I would continue. And I'd get the shit beat out of me, and I would trust the wrong people, and I would do the wrong things. I'd start to feel really good about myself, that I'd figured the whole thing out, and then something would go wrong. I would just keep going until I either was caught or we got out or something happened. That's what he does. So, I just tried to make him an everyman. I loved the fact that this guy was also an English teacher, so he was a romantic. He was talking about Don Quixote. He's got this whole romanticized vision of how you sacrifice yourself for a woman, how you go about something like this. It's terribly romanticized and so completely impractical.

Haggis also based John's research of prison break-out techniques on his own Internet research on the Church of Scientology after its San Diego chapter endorsed 2008 California Proposition 8, which revealed the faith's controversies to him and led to him leaving the church.

=== Filming ===
In October 2009, Haggis and his staff were in the principal photography stage of production filming in Pittsburgh, Pennsylvania. On October 4, 2009, filming of the movie was ongoing and was set to complete on December 12, 2009. On December 14, the Pittsburgh Post-Gazette reported that filming of The Next Three Days was going to wrap that day, after 52 days of shooting.

== Release ==
In October 2009, the film was originally scheduled to be released in 2011. By March 2010, the Australian media company Village Roadshow was set to release the film in Australia in November 2010. It was released in the United States on November 19, 2010.

== Reception ==
=== Critical response ===
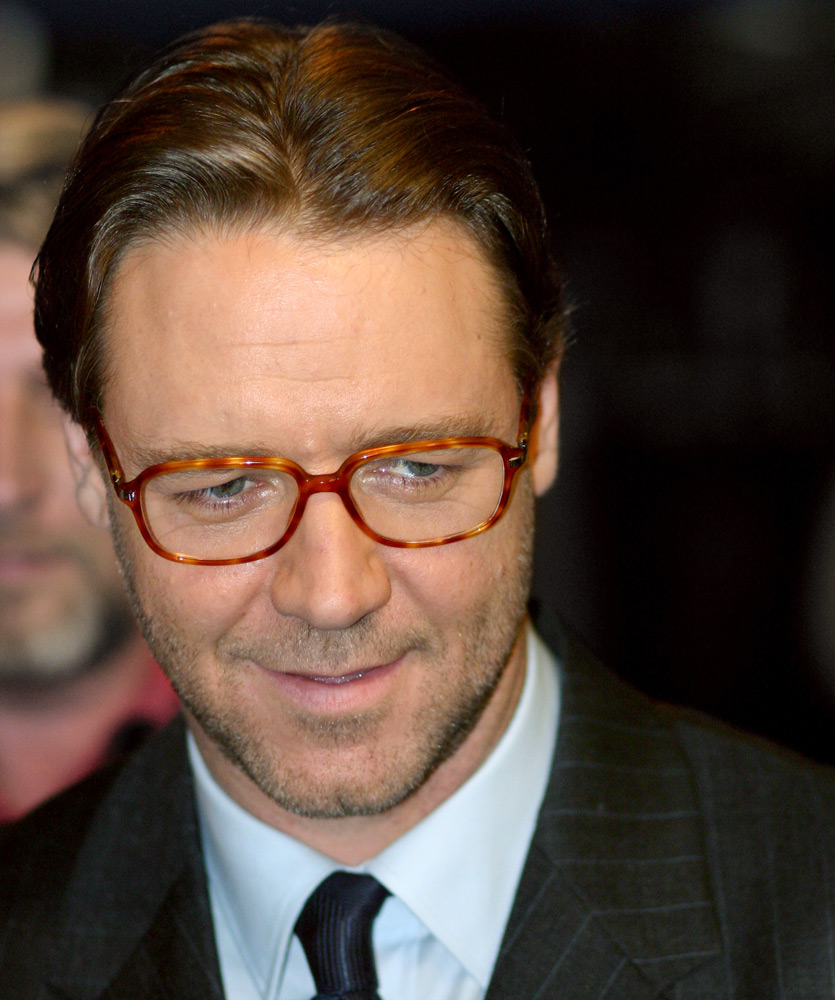
Russell Crowe was nominated for an Irish Film and Television Award for Best International Actor for his role as John Brennan.

On Rotten Tomatoes, the film has an approval rating of 50% based on 168 reviews, and an average rating of 5.8/10. The website's critics consensus reads: "Russell Crowe and Elizabeth Banks give it their all, but their solid performances aren't quite enough to compensate for The Next Three Days' uneven pace and implausible plot." On Metacritic, the film has a weighted average score of 52 out of 100 based on 36 critics, indicating "mixed or average reviews". Audiences polled by CinemaScore gave the film an average grade of "B+" on an A+ to F scale.

In her positive review, Lisa Schwarzbaum of Entertainment Weekly wrote, "The movie's real strength ... is generating escalating waves of plot tension and misdirection as John, heeding advice, makes his jail-busting moves." In contrast, Roger Ebert awarded the film two and a half out of four stars and said, "The Next Three Days is not a bad movie; it's just somewhat of a waste of the talent involved."

=== Box office ===
The film opened at #5 with a weekend gross of $6.5 million from 2,564 theaters, an average of $2,552 per theater. It closed on January 6, 2011, having earned $21.2 million domestically and $46.3 million overseas, for a worldwide total gross of $67.5 million, against its $30 million budget.
