= Mehdi Baki =

French actor and dancer

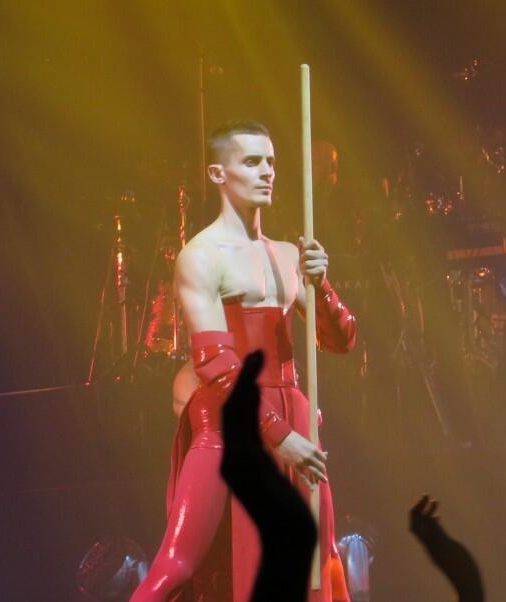
- Born: 2 March 1988 (age 38); Épinay-sur-Seine, France
- Occupations: actor; dancer; choreographer
- Years active: 2008–present

Mehdi Baki (born 2 March 1988) is a French actor, dancer and choreographer.

== Biography ==
Baki was born in France to an Algerian father and a French mother. Influenced by his brother and cousin, he began dancing at the age of eleven, practicing breakdancing, capoeira and acrobatics. He studied at the Académie Internationale de la Danse, in Paris. His research focuses on breakdancing, contemporary dance and physical theatre. In 2013, he trained in acting at L'École Internationale de Théâtre Jacques Lecoq.

Baki took part in several dance productions, in France and abroad, including theatre, film, tournée, musical, tv shows, orchestral concerts, music video and advertising. Among choreographers, he collaborated with Sébastien Lefrançois, Giuliano Peparini, James Thierrée, and Yoann Bourgeois.

In 2022, he made his film debut in the main cast of Cédric Klapisch's film Rise (En Corps) alongside the Paris Opera Ballet dancer Marion Barbeau.

== Filmography ==
=== Film ===
Year	Title	Role	Notes	Ref.
2022	Rise	Mehdi		
2023	Good Grief	Luca		

=== Music videos ===
Year	Title	Artist	Notes	Ref.
2012	À l'ombre	Mylène Farmer		
2016	Vivere a colori	Alessandra Amoroso		
2018	L'insatisfait	Suzane		
2019	Lunar	Bibi Zhou		
2021	Anthem Grey	Awir Leon		
2023	Purple Light	Vanupié		

=== Advertising ===
Year	Title	Director	Notes	Ref.
2017	Seat Ibiza: Dance	Nacho Gayan		
2019	Apple AirPods: Bounce	Oscar Hudson	artistic direction Yoann Bourgeois nominee for 72nd Primetime Emmy Awards	

== Theatre ==
=== Choreography ===
- 2008: Es war einmal, by Niels Robitzky
- 2011: Obstacle, by Sébastien Lefrançois
- 2013: Borderline, compagnie Wang Ramirez
- 2013: Tabac Rouge, by James Thierrée
- 2014: Hubris, by David Drouard
- 2014: Minuit, by Yoann Bourgeois
- 2018: Scala, by Yoann Bourgeois
- 2018: Bye bye myself, by Mehdi Baki and Nicholas Fayol
- 2020: OhhO, by Mehdi Baki and Nicholas Fayol
- 2022: Les Animaux Modeles, Pasdeloup Orchestra, Philharmonie de Paris
- 2023: Stand By, by Thi-May Nguyen
- 2024: Apaches, by Saïdo Lehlouh, Opéra national de Paris
- 2024: Témoin, by Saïdo Lehlouh
- 2024: Ring (Variations du couple), by Léonore Confino, choreography Mehdi Baki

=== Musical ===
- 2009–2010: Cléopâtre, la dernière Reine d'Egypte, by Kamel Ouali
- 2012–2014: 1789, Les Amants de la Bastille, by Giuliano Peparini

== Awards and nominations ==
Award	Date of ceremony	Category	Title	Result	Ref.
British Arrows	26 March 2021	Craft Gold in-camera effects incl. stunts	Apple AirPods: Bounce	Won	
