= Giorgio Gosetti =

Italian film critic, journalist and festival director (1956–2026)

Giorgio Gosetti (6 February 1956 – 6 March 2026) was an Italian film critic, journalist and festival director. He was best known as the founder and general delegate of the Giornate degli Autori, an independent sidebar of the Venice Film Festival, and for his work with the Rome Film Fest, the Noir in Festival and Rome's Casa del Cinema.

== Early life ==
Gosetti was born in Venice on 6 February 1956.

== Career ==
Gosetti worked as a writer and assistant director before becoming known as a film critic and journalist, and was a longtime member of FIPRESCI.

He began collaborating with the Venice International Film Festival in 1980 during the artistic direction of Carlo Lizzani. He continued to work with the festival under Gian Luigi Rondi, and later under Gillo Pontecorvo, for whom he was a close collaborator; he also curated the section Notti veneziane from 1992 to 1996.

In 2004, Gosetti founded and directed the Giornate degli Autori, the autonomous and parallel section of the Venice Film Festival, and remained its general delegate until his death.

Gosetti was also one of the founders of the Rome Film Fest, where he served as general director and artistic director from 2006 to 2008. He was artistic director of the Noir in Festival and directed the Casa del Cinema in Rome from 2014 to 2022.

Beyond his festival work, Gosetti served on juries and commissions, including the selection committee for the European Film Awards from 2017 to 2019, and was a partner for the LUX Audience Award.

== Personal life ==
Gosetti was married to Serena and had a son, Tommaso. He died on 6 March 2026, at the age of 70.
