= Rise (2022 French film) =

2022 film by Cédric Klapisch

- Theatrical release poster
- French: En corps
- Directed by: Cédric Klapisch
- Screenplay by: Cédric Klapisch; Santiago Amigorena
- Produced by: Bruno Levy
- Starring: Marion Barbeau; Hofesh Shechter; Denis Podalydès; Pio Marmaï; François Civil; Muriel Robin
- Cinematography: Alexis Kavyrchine
- Edited by: Anne-Sophie Bion
- Music by: Hofesh Shechter; Thomas Bangalter
- Production company: Ce qui me meut
- Distributed by: StudioCanal
- Release date: 31 January 2022
- Running time: 117 minutes
- Countries: France; Belgium
- Language: French
- Box office: $ 11 196 824

Rise (French: En corps) is a 2022 comedy drama film directed by Cédric Klapisch, from a screenplay by Klapisch and Santiago Amigorena.

== Premise ==
Elise, a promising classical dancer, tries to find a new direction in contemporary dancing after getting injured during a performance.

== Cast ==
- Marion Barbeau as Élise
- Hofesh Shechter as himself
- Denis Podalydès as Henri
- Muriel Robin as Josiane
- Pio Marmaï as Loïc
- François Civil as Yann
- Souheila Yacoub as Sabrina
- Mehdi Baki as himself
- Alexia Giordano as herself
- Robinson Cassarino as himself
- Damien Chapelle as Julien

== Production ==
The principal photography began on 21 December 2020 in Paris, France and lasted for nine weeks. The shooting also took place in Brittany and Morbihan.

== Accolades ==
Award	Date of ceremony	Category	Recipient(s)	Result	Ref.
Lumière Awards	16 January 2023	Best Female Revelation	Marion Barbeau	Nominated	
César Awards	24 February 2023	Best Film	Bruno Levy and Cédric Klapisch	Nominated	
César Awards	24 February 2023	Best Director	Cédric Klapisch	Nominated	
César Awards	24 February 2023	Best Supporting Actor	François Civil	Nominated	
César Awards	24 February 2023	Best Supporting Actor	Pio Marmaï	Nominated	
César Awards	24 February 2023	Most Promising Actress	Marion Barbeau	Nominated	
César Awards	24 February 2023	Best Original Screenplay	Cédric Klapisch and Santiago Amigorena	Nominated	
César Awards	24 February 2023	Best Cinematography	Alexis Kavyrchine	Nominated	
César Awards	24 February 2023	Best Editing	Anne-Sophie Bion	Nominated	
César Awards	24 February 2023	Best Sound	Cyril Moisson, Nicolas Moreau and Cyril Holtz	Nominated	
