= The Residence (film) =

2025 thriller film

- Theatrical release poster
- French: Dalloway
- Directed by: Yann Gozlan
- Screenplay by: Yann Gozlan; Nicolas Bouvet-Levrard; Thomas Kruithof
- Based on: Flowers of Darkness by Tatiana de Rosnay
- Produced by: Éric Altmayer; Nicolas Altmayer
- Starring: Cécile de France; Lars Mikkelsen; Anna Mouglalis; Frédéric Pierrot; Freya Mavor; Mylène Farmer
- Cinematography: Manu Dacosse
- Edited by: Valentin Féron
- Music by: Philippe Rombi
- Production companies: Mandarin & Compagnie; Gaumont; Panache Production; La Compagnie Cinématographique
- Distributed by: Gaumont (France); Anga Distribution (Belgium)
- Release dates: 16 May 2025 (Cannes); 17 September 2025 (France); 17 September 2025 (Belgium)
- Running time: 110 minutes
- Countries: France; Belgium
- Language: French
- Box office: $1.4 million

The Residence (French: Dalloway) is a 2025 thriller film written and directed by Yann Gozlan. Gozlan wrote the screenplay with Nicolas Bouvet-Levrard and Thomas Kruithof, which they adapted from Tatiana de Rosnay's 2020 novel Flowers of Darkness. The film stars Cécile de France as a writer participating in an artist residency where she is assisted by a dedicated artificial intelligence system, which is voiced by singer Mylène Farmer. The supporting cast includes Anna Mouglalis, Frédéric Pierrot, Lars Mikkelsen, Freya Mavor and Douglas Grauwels. It is a co-production between France and Belgium.

The film had its world premiere at the Midnight Screenings section of the 78th Cannes Film Festival on 16 May 2025. It was theatrically released in France and Belgium on 17 September 2025.

== Plot ==
In order to find new inspiration for her next novel, writer Clarissa participates in a prestigious artist residency program. Through this artist grant, she meets the state-of-the-art virtual assistant Dalloway. This AI-powered app is supposed to help her write during her stay and now serve as her companion. But in reality, Clarissa feels that Dalloway is increasingly trying to become a part of her life. She soon suspects that she is being monitored. Her suspicions are further reinforced by another participant in the program, a whistleblower, who warns her about the AI app. Clarissa then begins to investigate on her own to discover the true intentions of her hosts.

== Cast ==
- Cécile de France as Clarissa
- Lars Mikkelsen as Mathias Nielsen
- Anna Mouglalis as Anne Dewinter
- Frédéric Pierrot as Antoine
- Freya Mavor as Mia White
- Mylène Farmer as Dalloway (voice)
- Douglas Grauwels

== Production ==
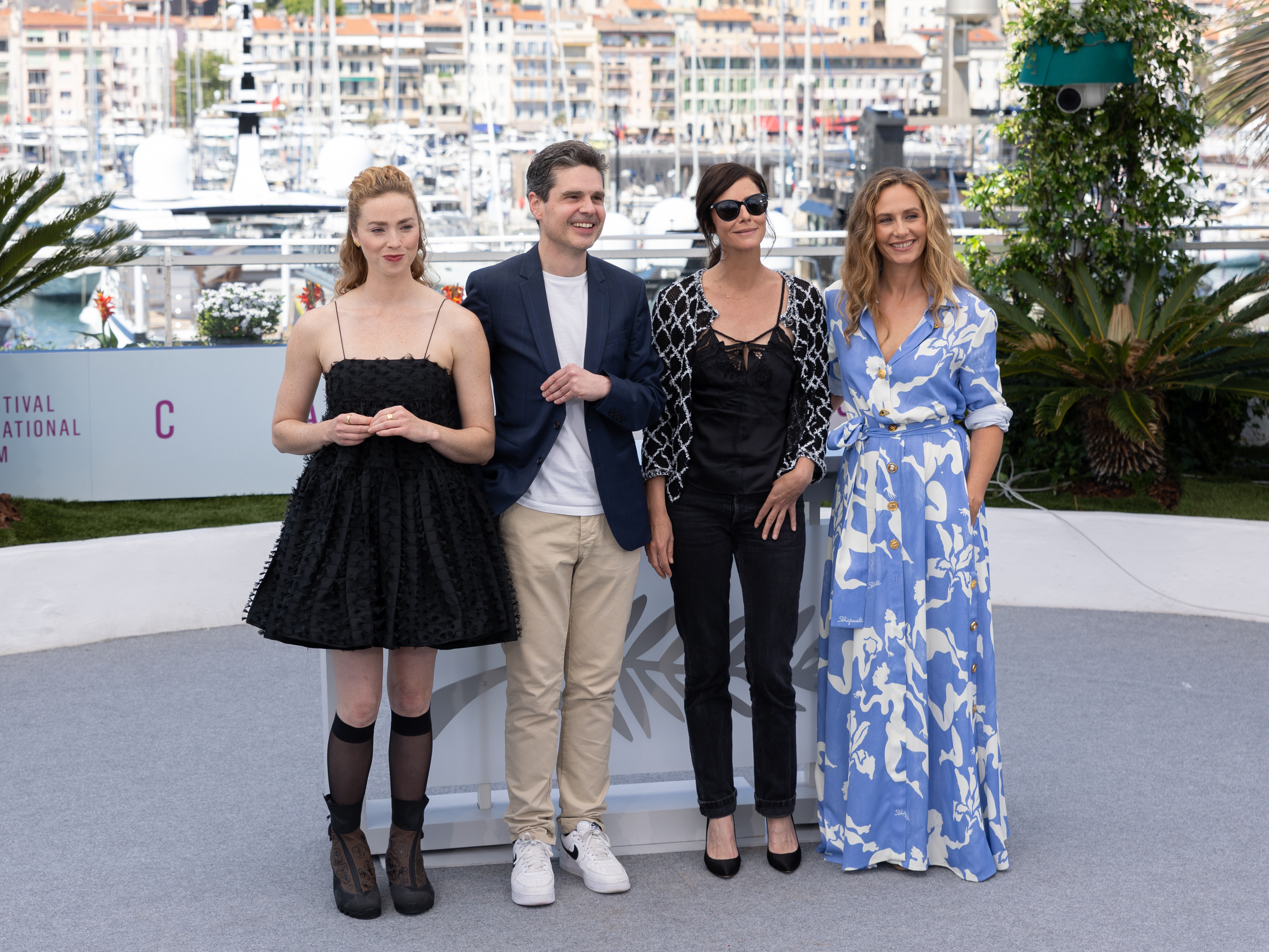
The director Yann Gozlan with cast actresses Freya Mavor, Anna Mouglalis and Cécile de France at the 78th Cannes Film Festival.

The Residence is the sixth feature film by French director Yann Gozlan. He wrote the screenplay with Nicolas Bouvet-Levrard and Thomas Kruithof, the former whom he previously collaborated on the thriller Black Box (2021). It is inspired by Tatiana de Rosnay's novel Flowers of Darkness (French: Les Fleurs de l'ombre), published in 2020 and set in the near future. The lead role was given to Belgian actress Cécile de France. Other roles include Anna Mouglalis, Frédéric Pierrot, Lars Mikkelsen, Freya Mavor and Belgian actor Douglas Grauwels. Singer Mylène Farmer was hired to be the voice of the titular AI assistant.

Filming was scheduled to continue until mid-August 2024. A total of 45 days of filming were planned, including 35 in Brussels. Manu Dacosse served as the director of photography, while Gozlan's longtime partner, Valentin Féron, was responsible for editing.

The film was produced by Éric and Nicolas Altmayer of Mandarin & Compagnie with Gaumont. It was co-produced by the Belgian companies Panache Production and La Compagnie Cinématographique. The film project also received financial support from Walloon government initiatives such as Wallimage and Screen.Brussels.

== Release ==
The Residence was selected to be screened out of competition in the Midnight Screenings section at the 78th Cannes Film Festival, where it had its world premiere on 16 May 2025.

International sales were handled by Gaumont, which also theatrically released the film in France on 17 September 2025, with Anga Distribution simultaneously releasing the film in Belgium.
