= Mars Films =

French film company

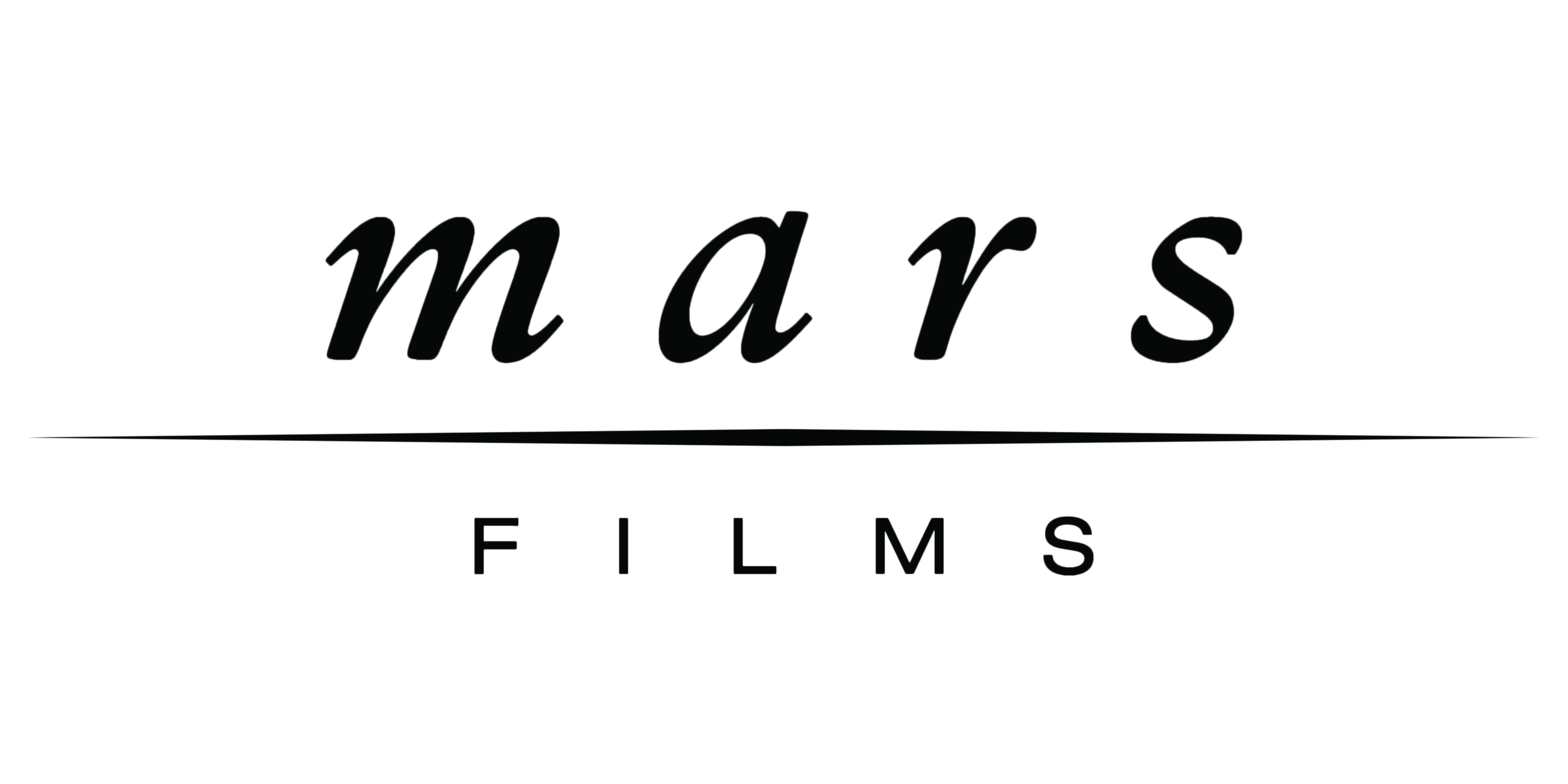
- Company type: SAS
- Industry: Film
- Founded: 18 June 2007
- Founder: Stéphane Célérier; Valérie Garcia
- Services: Film distribution; Film production
- Parent: StudioCanal (2015–present)

Mars Films, also known as Mars Distribution, is a French motion picture company. It was established as an independent company by Stéphane Célérier and Valérie Garcia in 2007. It was acquired in 2021 by Vivendi, whose Canal+ subsidiary StudioCanal now operates its extensive library.

== History ==
A former distribution subsidiary of BAC Films, Mars Films was acquired at 80 percent by StudioCanal in 2000 and served as the French distribution outfit for films financed and produced by StudioCanal. In 2002, StudioCanal bought it out entirely, retaining Stéphane Célérier as head. Célérier was ousted in November 2006 and replaced by Philippe Désandré, with Mars Films renamed to StudioCanal Distribution. At the time, it was classed as the fifth most popular distributor in 2006 with a 9.7% market share (or 15.3m admissions for 28 titles released). Célérier went on to reclaim the name and set up, in 2007, an independent company with Valérie Garcia.

In September 2015, Vivendi, the parent company of Groupe Canal+ (which operates StudioCanal), announced it had acquired a 30 percent stake in Mars Films. Stéphane Célérier was appointed vice-chairman of StudioCanal as part of the deal. At the time, Mars Films was again ranked as the fifth largest distributor in France.

Mars Films' catalogue includes the comedy-drama La Famille Bélier, which became a hit in France and was remade into the Academy Award-winning CODA; Two Is a Family with Omar Sy; Fred Cavayé's Nothing to Hide, François Ozon's In the House, Régis Roinsard's Populaire, Guillaume Canet's Blood Ties, Costa-Gavras' Capital. It also picked up the French distribution for several successful indie titles from the U.S. such Steve McQueen's 12 Years a Slave, Barry Jenkins' Moonlight, Craig Gillespie's I, Tonya (2017), Matt Ross' Captain Fantastic (2016), Harmony Korine's Spring Breakers, Jeff Nichols' Loving, and Woody Allen's Midnight in Paris, To Rome with Love, Magic in the Moonlight and Blue Jasmine.

On 1 August 2019, the company went into receivership after it stopped paying creditors. It was ordered by the Tribunal de commerce de Paris to restructure. On 11 August 2021, minority shareholder Vivendi acquired the remaining 70% share of Mars Films from May Holding. It also acquired its library of more than 200 titles for all rights in France, which is now fully operated by StudioCanal. Vivendi's paid a total of €17.3 million in its acquisition of Mars Films and laid off its 11 employees. The court ruling stated that the company "will now be focused on the distribution of its library titles and will limit the number of new films released". Upon its restructuring, Variety wrote, "So far, no other French company has managed to fill the gap left by Mars Films as a key purveyor of U.S. independent films." In 2022, Célérier went on to launch a new production company named Gemma Pictures with PGS Entertainment. That same year, Garcia launched her own company Gabman.

== Selected filmography ==
Mars Films films
Release date (Note: The listed date refers to the film's limited or wide theatrical release in France by Mars Films, not necessarily its first screening or when it premiered.)	Title	Director(s)	French box office (admissions)	Ref.
22 July 2009	Totally Spies! The Movie	Pascal Jardin	146,388	
8 September 2010	Of Gods and Men	Xavier Beauvois	3,204,147	
10 November 2010	Potiche	François Ozon	2,318,221	
21 September 2011	War of the Buttons	Christophe Barratier	1,542,231	
19 October 2011	Polisse	Maïwenn	2,414,418	
29 February 2012	The Players	Various	2,301,045	
10 October 2012	In the House	François Ozon	1,195,518	
28 November 2012	Populaire	Régis Roinsard	1,167,403	
2 January 2013	Renoir	Gilles Bourdos	502,064	
21 August 2013	Young & Beautiful	François Ozon	712,767	
30 October 2013	Blood Ties	Guillaume Canet	238,823	
13 November 2013	Venus in Fur	Roman Polanski	264,029	
16 July 2014	In the Name of My Daughter	André Téchiné	300,373	
5 November 2014	The New Girlfriend	François Ozon	568,161	
17 December 2014	La Famille Bélier	Éric Lartigau	7,450,944	
18 March 2015	A Perfect Man	Yann Gozlan	667,261	
1 April 2015	Diary of a Chambermaid	Benoît Jacquot	333,118	
8 April 2015	Dark Places	Gilles Paquet-Brenner	239,160	
24 June 2015	One Wild Moment	Jean-François Richet	854,153	
7 September 2016	Frantz	François Ozon	637,625	
28 October 2015	Lolo	Julie Delpy	906,840	
10 February 2016	The Innocents	Anne Fontaine	702,040	
7 December 2016	Two Is a Family	Hugo Gélin	3,237,948	
25 January 2017	The Climb	Ludovic Bernard	1,136,827	
26 May 2017	L'Amant double	François Ozon	387,829	
7 June 2017	The Man with the Iron Heart	Cédric Jimenez	242,999	
1 November 2017	Based on a True Story	Roman Polanski	110,940	
4 April 2018	Just a Breath Away	Daniel Roby	256,506	
17 October 2018	Nothing to Hide	Fred Cavayé	1,639,781	
28 November 2018	Through the Fire	Frédéric Tellier	1,014,439	
12 December 2018	Remi, Nobody's Boy	Antoine Blossier	857,515	
20 February 2019	By the Grace of God	François Ozon	915,327	
27 March 2019	Real Love	Claire Burger	102,934	
3 April 2019	Love at Second Sight	Hugo Gélin	559,126	
29 January 2020	The Translators	Régis Roinsard	279,035	

=== U.S. titles ===
- The American (2010)
- Greenberg (2010)
- Midnight in Paris (2011)
- Arthur Newman (2012)
- Bachelorette (2012)
- Promised Land (2012)
- Spring Breakers (2012)
- To Rome with Love (2012)
- 12 Years a Slave (2013)
- Blue Jasmine (2013)
- Don Jon (2013)
- Twenty Feet from Stardom (2013)
- Foxcatcher (2014)
- Magic in the Moonlight (2014)
- While We're Young (2014)
- Irrational Man (2015)
- Jane Got a Gun (2015)
- 20th Century Women (2016)
- All I See Is You (2016)
- Café Society (2016)
- Captain Fantastic (2016)
- The Last Face (2016)
- Loving (2016)
- Moonlight (2016)
- Triple 9 (2016)
- The Circle (2017)
- Disobedience (2017)
- I, Tonya (2017)
- It Comes at Night (2017)
- Wonder Wheel (2017)
- If Beale Street Could Talk (2018)
- Life Itself (2018)
- On the Basis of Sex (2018)
- Tully (2018)
- Vice (2018)
- A Rainy Day in New York (2019)
