= A Perfect Man (2015 film) =

- Film poster
- Directed by: Yann Gozlan
- Written by: Yann Gozlan; Guillaume Lemans; Grégoire Vigneron
- Produced by: Wassim Béji; Thibault Gast; Matthias Weber
- Starring: Pierre Niney; Ana Girardot
- Cinematography: Antoine Roch
- Edited by: Grégoire Sivan
- Music by: Cyrille Aufort
- Production companies: 2425 Films; Wy Productions; TF1 Films Production; Mars Films
- Distributed by: Mars Distribution
- Release date: 18 March 2015
- Running time: 97 minutes
- Country: France
- Language: French
- Budget: $5.2 million
- Box office: $3.8 million

A Perfect Man (French: Un homme idéal) is a 2015 French thriller film directed by Yann Gozlan. The film tells the story of a struggling author who discovers a manuscript, the war memoir of a man who has recently died, and publishes it as his own work. The film stars Pierre Niney and Ana Girardot.

== Plot ==
Matthieu Vasseur, an aspiring writer working for a house clearance business, has had the manuscript of his first novel rejected repeatedly by publishers. When he discovers a diary, written during the Algerian War, among the possessions of a recently deceased soldier, he publishes it as his own work to great acclaim. While attending an event to celebrate the release of his book, he begins a relationship with book critic Alice Fursac.

Three years pass and he has failed to produce another novel, having spent what his first book earned as well as the advance he has received for his next work. At a book signing, Matthieu is blackmailed by a mysterious older man who knows and can prove he is a fraud while others, particularly Alice's family friend Stanislas, are doubting his talent. In order to keep the man quiet, he fakes a robbery in which he takes Alice's father's collection of antique firearms to trade with the man, Vincent. Before he can hand them over, Stan finds the "stolen" antiques and confronts Matthieu, who inadvertently kills him with a blow to the head. Matthieu begins to hallucinate and, through the night, disposes of the body by throwing it into the ocean along with Stanislas' belongings.

Feeling a burst of creative energy, he writes a new novel, and prints the finished manuscript, intending to send it to his publisher. Meanwhile, the local police have recovered the body and assure the Fursac family that they will be taking DNA samples and matching them to those on Stanislas' body. Following the news of Stan's death, Alice and her parents decide to meet his family in London, and Matthieu leaves the manuscript with her to read.

Vincent, who has a good relationship with the police, is aware of Matthieu's predicament, and asks for more money. While arranging another meet up, Matthieu decides to stage his own death by crashing Monsieur Fursac's car and killing Vincent in the process, who is then burnt along with Matthieu's belongings, successfully fooling the police who report the death of the now famous novelist.

Two years later, working cash-in-hand jobs around Paris, he sees Alice from afar in a bookshop, celebrating the supposedly posthumous publication of Matthieu's second novel, titled "Shams" and Mathieu and sees his son with Alice and left.

== Cast ==
- Pierre Niney as Mathieu Vasseur
- Ana Girardot as Alice Fursac
- André Marcon as Alain Fursac
- Valeria Cavalli as Hélène Fursac
- Thibault Vinçon as Stanislas Richer
- Marc Barbé as Vincent
- Sacha Mijovic as Franck
- Eric Savin as Gendarme
- Laurent Grévill as Stéphane Marsan
