= Marion Barbeau =

French ballerina and actress (born 1991)

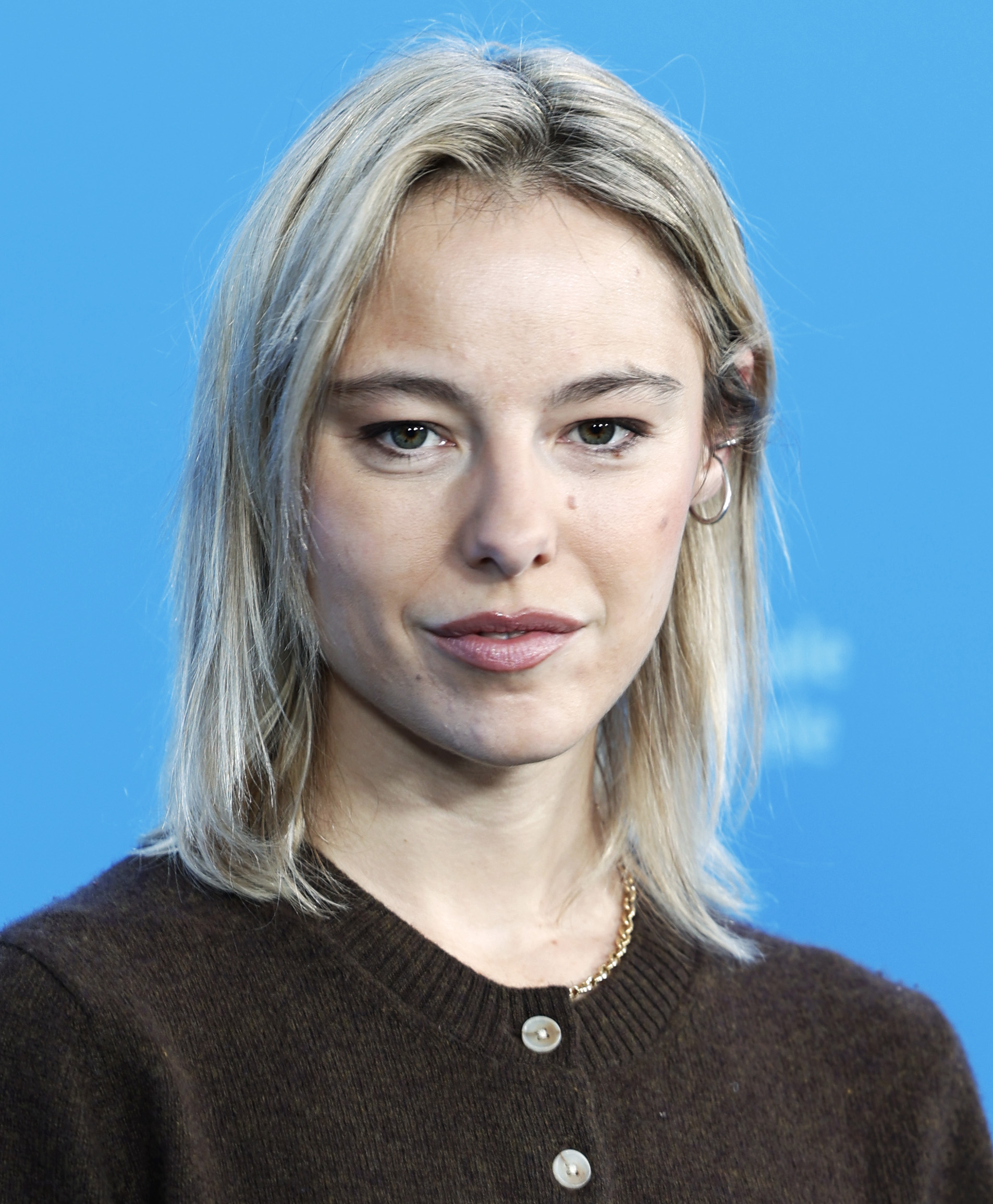
- Barbeau in 2026
- Born: 1991 (age 34–35); Nogent-sur-Marne, France
- Occupations: Ballerina; actress
- Years active: 2008–present

Marion Barbeau (born 1991) is a French ballerina and actress.

== Biography ==
Marion Barbeau was born in 1991 in Nogent-sur-Marne, in the Val-de-Marne department. Her father was a dentist. She began practicing dance at the age of six, studying at a school in Fontenay-sous-Bois.

After studying at the Conservatoire de Paris, she entered the ballet school of the Paris Opera Ballet in 2002. In 2008, at the age of 17, she joined its corps de ballet. In 2019, she became a première danseuse (first dancer).

In addition to her classical repertoire she gradually embraced contemporary dance. In her evolution, which began under the guidance of Benjamin Millepied, she was encouraged by Aurélie Dupont, director of the Paris Opera Ballet since 2016, who included many non-classical productions in her repertoire. Barbeau credited her experience with Israeli choreographer Hofesh Shechter, who she met at the Paris Opera in 2018, as the "real turning point" in her journey into the contemporary genre. Shechter's piece The Art of Not Looking Back entered the Paris Opera Ballet's repertoire in 2018, and was recorded for video by director Cédric Klapisch.

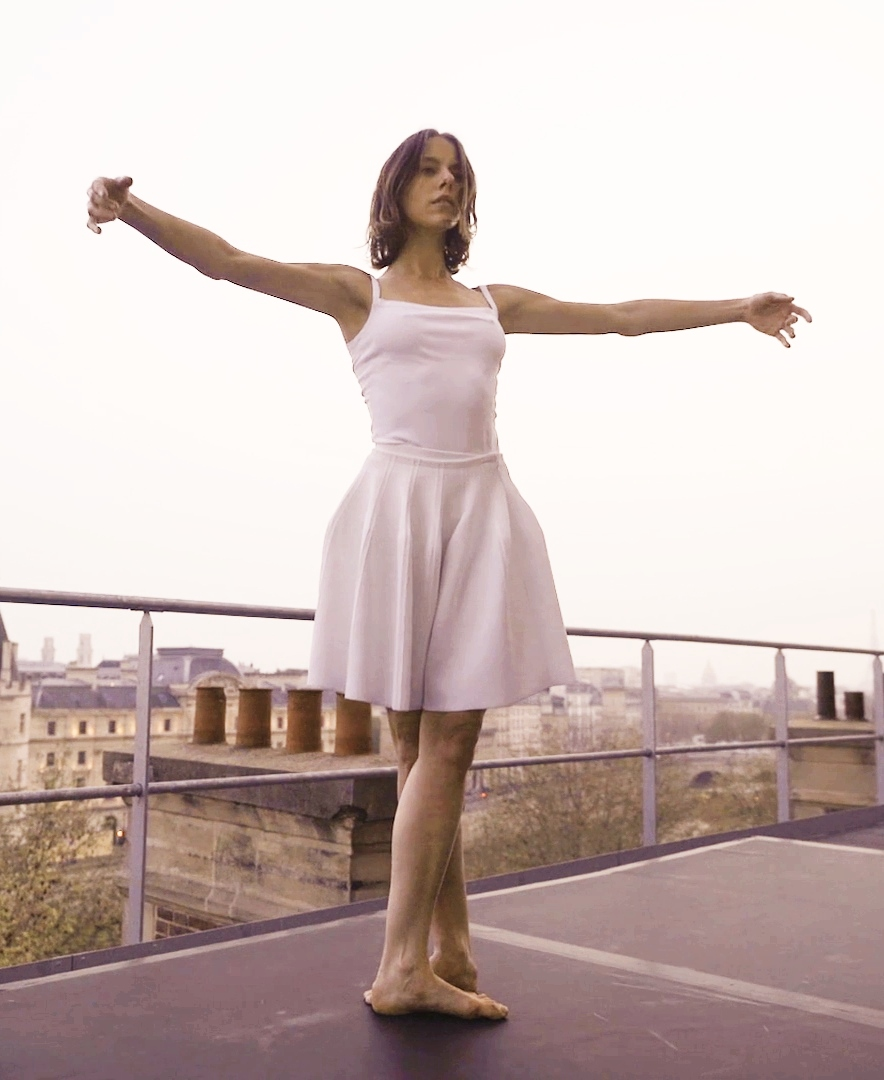
Marion Barbeau in 2021

In 2022 Barbeau appeared in the leading role in Cédric Klapisch's film Rise, about a dancer who, after sustaining an injury, becomes passionate about contemporary dance. For her performance, Barbeau received nominations for the César Award for Most Promising Actress and Lumière Award for Best Female Revelation.

== Filmography ==
=== Film ===
Year	Title	Role	Notes	Ref.
2022	Rise	Élise Gautier		
2024	Un homme en fuite	Charlène Sorbier		
2024	Drone	Émilie		
2025	Guru	Adèle		
2026	In a Whisper	Alice		

=== Music videos ===
Year	Title	Artist	Notes	Ref.
2020	"Tendrement"	Oxmo Puccino		
2020	"Soleil pâle"	Hania Rani		
2022	"Slow Savage"	Idles		

== Awards and nominations ==
Award	Date of ceremony	Category	Title	Result	Ref.
César Awards	24 February 2023	Most Promising Actress	Rise	Nominated	
Lumière Awards	16 January 2023	Best Female Revelation	Rise	Nominated	
