= La Mécanique de l'ombre =

2016 French thriller film

- Theatrical release poster
- Directed by: Thomas Kruithof
- Written by: Thomas Kruithof; Yann Gozlan; Marc Syrigas; Aurélie Valat
- Produced by: Thibault Gast; Matthias Weber
- Starring: François Cluzet; Denis Podalydès; Sami Bouajila; Simon Abkarian; Alba Rohrwacher
- Cinematography: Alex Lamarque
- Edited by: Jean-Baptiste Beaudoin
- Music by: Grégoire Auger
- Production companies: 24 25 Films; Scope Pictures; RTBF; SABAH 5 Productions
- Distributed by: Océan Films (France); TeleScope Film Distribution (Belgium)
- Release dates: 25 August 2016 (Angoulême); 11 January 2017 (Belgium and France)
- Running time: 93 minutes
- Countries: France; Belgium
- Language: French
- Budget: $6 million
- Box office: $1.5 million

La Mécanique de l'ombre, known in English as The Eavesdropper and Scribe, is a 2016 action thriller film directed by Thomas Kruithof in his feature directorial debut. The film was a co-production between companies in France and Belgium.

== Plot ==
Duval, a lonely, middle-aged accountant, has lost his job due to his alcoholism. Two years later, he is shown to have joined Alcoholics Anonymous, where he meets Sara, another recovering alcoholic, and they gradually become friends. With Duval still out of work, he has an apparent chance meeting at a funeral with a former business acquaintance, De Grugy, who recommends Duval to Clément, the head of private surveillance company.

Clément hires Duval to transcribe recordings of phone intercepts, but he insists on very specific work conditions. Duval's new workplace is an unfurnished apartment, where he must work alone every day from 9am to 6pm, transcribing phone conversations from cassette tapes, using only an old IBM Selectric typewriter. Any pages that have errors must be shredded; he is forbidden to leave the apartment during work hours or take any material away; he cannot smoke in the apartment, interact with anyone else in the building, or tell anyone about his work; and he is always paid in cash. At the same time, two major political events are underway - France is nearing a Presidential election, in which an Alt-Right candidate is standing against the incumbent, and the race is complicated by a political crisis involving a group of French citizens being held hostage in the Middle East.

Although he initially pays little heed to the content of the tapes, Duval gradually becomes aware that they are evidently intercepted conversations with senior government officials - many involving a government official called Labarthe, and a Middle Eastern lawyer called Al Shamikh - and that all the taped individuals appear to have intimate knowledge of the hostage crisis. Duval is also surprised to discover that Clément is having him watched, and on several occasions he turns up for work to find typed notes from Clément, containing orders not to smoke in the apartment.

Although the job is at first uneventful, and his life is getting back on track, things take a sinister turn after Duval transcribes a conversation between Al Shamikh and Labarthe, in which Al Shamikh claims to have notebooks that contain critical information about the hostage crisis. The tape ends abruptly with what sounds like a struggle and, soon after, Duval is shocked to learn that Al Shamikh has been murdered. He starts to have serious doubts about his work and decides to quit, but at this point he begins to be visited at the apartment by Gerfaut, who claims to work for Clément.

Increasingly disturbed by the content of the tapes and their apparent connections to the hostage crisis and the murder of Al Shamikh, Duval tells Gerfaut that he wants to quit, but Gerfaut convinces him to wait. On a subsequent visit, Gerfaut demands both the cassette and the transcription of the Al Shamikh tape, and soon after he insists that Duval accompany him to Al Shamikh's office, where he intends to steal the notebooks. When they arrive, Gerfaut demands that Duval assist him, but when Duval refuses, Gerfaut turns on him and strangles him with the car seat-belt until he agrees to help. They enter the office and Duval keeps watch while Gerfaut searches for the notebooks, but Duval is surprised by a cleaner entering the office, and to Duval's horror, Gerfaut brutally knocks the cleaner to the ground and strangles him to death to prevent him identifying them. After realizing that the apartment does not contain the notebooks, a frustrated Gerfaut commands Duval to return home and stay there without answering anything.

At home, Duval receives a call from Clément, who tells him to step into a car outside. The men in the car cover Duval's head, driving him to an unknown location. He is led into a house where Clément interrogates him briefly about his interactions with Gerfaut and his knowledge of the notebooks' whereabouts. Clément then leads Duval into a bare room where he sees Gerfaut, tied to a chair and bleeding from numerous wounds. Clément demands to know where the notebooks are, but Gerfaut is defiant and refuses to say, and it is clear that Clément will to kill him either way. Duval is told that Gerfaut used to work for Clément but is now working on his own, and he also realises that Clément has had him under close surveillance the whole time but, to his surprise, Clément orders him to return to work, and he is driven back to town.

Panic-stricken, Duval returns home, determined to flee. He grabs his passport and all the cash he has saved from his job, and leaves his apartment, but within moments he is seized by two men and bundled into a car. These men, it transpires, work for the secret service. He is held for some time before being interrogated by two men, one of whom turns out to be Labarthe, the other voice from the Al Shamikh tape. Labarthe tells Duval that the secret service are investigating Clément's activities and want to find him, and he reveals that he has surveillance camera footage from Al Shamikh's office that shows Duval in the room with Gerfaut when he murdered the cleaner. Duval resists, pleading that Clément is watching them all, and that he knows from the tapes that Clément has been tapping Labarthe's phone, but Labarthe secures his cooperation by threatening to give his file to the public prosecutor.

Arriving home, he is dismayed to see Sara waiting for him; at first he suspects she is in league with Clément, and he angrily demands to know how she knew where he lives, then orders her to leave, but then he collapses, she returns to assist him, and he tells her all that has transpired.

The next day, Duval reluctantly returns to work but he is panic-stricken when he begins typing the next tape, and realises it is a recording of a conversation between himself and Labarthe, and that Clément still has them under surveillance. The terrified Duval rushes out to call Labarthe from a public phone, pleading that he is in mortal danger, and that Clément clearly knows all about Labarthe's investigation and is monitoring them both closely, but Labarthe orders Duval to stay put. Duval is taken in a car by Clément's men, which he narrowly escapes by attacking the driver and inducing a car crash. He rushes back to his home to find that it has been ransacked by Clément's men, who are searching for the notebooks, and he realises they have also kidnapped Sara, who had stayed the night there.

Labarthe orders Duval to contact Clément and arrange a meeting, under the pretext of giving Clément the Al Shamikh notebooks he has been searching for. Labarthe also reveals that the notebooks don't really exist, and that he is merely using their supposed contents as bait to lure Clément out so that they can arrest him.

Duval tries to find the secretive Clément, at first without success, but then he remembers Chalamont, the business friend who had originally recommended Duval for the job. He goes to De Grugy, who at first claims ignorance, but when the now-desperate Duval uses physical force to intimidate him, De Grugy relents, gives him Clément's phone number, and Duval arranges the meeting, which secures Sara's release.

The climactic meeting takes place in an empty sports arena. Before they enter, Labarthe tries to allay Duval's fears by assuring him that they will be watched by his agents throughout the meeting. When Clément arrives, he and Labarthe dismiss their minders, and Clément makes a series of stunning revelations - he too works for a shadowy branch of the French security services, he has had Labarthe's agency under surveillance the entire time and knows all about his operation, and that he, Clément, is a close ally of the new "alt-Right" President. He also admits that the knows the notebook story was a ruse, and reveals that the delay in releasing the hostages was a deliberate ploy to discredit the defeated President, and give the kudos for securing the hostages' release to the incoming President. Clément then effectively blackmails Labarthe into acquiescence by telling him that unless he drops his attempts to stop Clément, he will have no future under the new administration.

Labarthe hesitates, but to Duval's dismay he finally agrees to Clément's terms. The tables are dramatically turned when Duval takes matters into his own hands - he seizes Labarthe's wrist, which has a microphone to communicate with his agents, and he shouts "Engage! Engage!". Labarthe's agents take this as an order and the sharpshooters open fire, killing Clément and his bodyguards. A stunned Labarthe realises the game is over and Duval is released. As he walks out of the arena, we hear news voice-overs of the successful release of the hostages.

The film concludes with Duval going to the hospital where Sara is doing voluntary work, and the final scene depicts Duval and Sara looking at each other across the hospital corridor. The movie ends at this point, without revealing whether or not their relationship will continue.

== Cast ==
- François Cluzet as Duval
- Denis Podalydès as Clément
- Sami Bouajila as Labarthe
- Simon Abkarian as Gerfaut
- Alba Rohrwacher as Sara
- Philippe Résimont as De Grugy
- Daniel Hanssens as Albert
- Nader Farman as Al-Shamikh
- Angelo Dello Spedale as Pernot
- Jean-Marie Winling as Philippe Chalamont (voice)

== Release ==
The film premiered on 25 August 2016 at the Angoulême Francophone Film Festival. It was theatrically released in France by Océan Films on 11 January 2017, and on the same day in Belgium by TeleScope Film Distribution. Arrow Films distributed the film in the UK and Ireland on 21 July 2017, under the title Scribe.
