= Burn Out (film) =

2017 film by Yann Gozlan

- Theatrical release poster
- Directed by: Yann Gozlan
- Written by: Yann Gozlan; Guillaume Lemans; Jérémie Guez; Simon Moutairou
- Based on: Balancé dans les cordes by Jérémie Guez
- Produced by: Wassim Béji; Thibault Gast; Matthias Weber
- Starring: François Civil; Olivier Rabourdin; Manon Azem
- Cinematography: Antoine Roch
- Edited by: Valentin Féron
- Music by: Gregoire Auger
- Production companies: 24 25 Films; WY Productions; Sombrero Films; Gaumont; Nexus Factory; Umedia
- Distributed by: Gaumont
- Release dates: 5 December 2017 (Noir in Festival); 3 January 2018 (France)
- Running time: 103 minutes
- Countries: France; Belgium
- Language: French
- Box office: $1.1 million

Burn Out is a 2017 action thriller film written and directed by Yann Gozlan, based on the 2012 novel Balancé dans les cordes by Jérémie Guez, and starring François Civil. The film is a co-production between France and Belgium. It was screened in competition at the Noir in Festival in Italy on 5 December 2017, and was released theatrically in France by Gaumont on 3 January 2018. A Spanish remake titled Centauro was released in 2022 by Netflix.

== Plot ==
Tony Rodrigues is a bike racer who has aspirations to enter the professional circuit. While not racing, he splits his time between working as a forklift operator during the daytime, and taking care of his son Sofiane whenever his ex-wife Leyla attempts to find employment. During one of his scheduled meetings with Leyla, Tony encounters a group of gypsie gang members led by Jordan exiting Leyla's residence. Tony finds Leyla beaten up and her apartment trashed, learning that Leyla was hiding drugs for Jordan, but the current supply in her possession was stolen by her ex-boyfriend. In an attempt to help her, Tony seeks out Jordan, and with the aid of his childhood friend and current street gang leader, Moussa, Tony meets with Jordan at their local bar in order to negotiate on settling Leyla's debt.

Jordan dismisses Tony outright, but his boss, Miguel is more receptive to Tony. In order to pay off Leyla's debt, Tony is given the job of transporting drugs to designated spots by motorcycle within a 2-hour limit for two months. Tony's moonlighting jeopardizes both his daytime job and his tryout for a motorcycle team, which ultimately leads him to failing at both of them. After completing the last delivery, Jordan changes the terms on Tony, forcing him to endlessly work as a drug courier. In retaliation, Tony beats Jordan to death with his motorcycle helmet.

Feeling betrayed, Tony enlists Moussa's aid in disposing of Jordan's body, and offers Miguel's assets to Mouusa in exchange to eliminate Miguel as a threat. Tony allows himself to be captured by Miguel in order to have Moussa tail him. Complications arise when local traffic create an obstacle for Moussa, and Miguel learns from his gang members that Tony lied to him about Jordan's fate. After a failed escape attempt, Tony is rescued by Moussa and his men, and Miguel is shot to death by Moussa's gang. After the fight, Tony works as a warehouse worker, but misses his thrill-seeking. As Leyla and Sofiane go to sleep for the night, Tony goes on a drive in his bike, and instigates a police chase.

== Cast ==
- François Civil as Tony Rodrigues
- Olivier Rabourdin as Miguel
- Manon Azem as Leyla
- Samuel Jouy as Jordan
- Narcisse Mame as Moussa
- Naël Rabia as Sofiane
- Sam Louwyck as Mike Paterson
- Luc Schwarz as Mario
- Mario Magalhaes as Serge
- Marc-Antoine Duquenne as Steve
- Ismaëla Koita as Kenji
- Kaourou Camara as Max
- Denis Leluc as Tamazo
- Walid Afkir as Farid
- Dimitri Boetto as Bellata

== Release ==
Burn Out was screened in competition at the Noir in Festival in Milan, Italy on 5 December 2017, and was released in theaters in France on 3 January 2018. On 27 April 2018, the film had its North American premiere at the COLCOA French Film Festival in Los Angeles.

== Reception ==
=== Box office ===
Burn Out made a total of $1,144,435 at the French box office.

=== Critical reception ===
Charles Bramesco of Vulture liked the "sheer propulsive energy of shots following François as he darts through traffic", but that the film "runs out of fuel" on its familiar premise. David Duprey of That Moment In found it "competently made and adrenaline-stomping", but "lacking in innovation". Similarly, Jonathon Wilson of Ready Steady Cut found it lacking in originality but that it makes up for it in tension and action.

== Streaming and home media distribution ==
Netflix acquired exclusive rights worldwide, except in France, for the film, and released it on 15 March 2019 as a Netflix original in the United States.
