= Anything for Her =

- Directed by: Fred Cavayé
- Screenplay by: Fred Cavayé; Guillaume Lemans
- Story by: Fred Cavayé
- Produced by: Olivier Delbosc; Eric Jehelmann; Marc Missonnier
- Starring: Vincent Lindon; Diane Kruger; Olivier Marchal
- Cinematography: Alain Duplantier
- Edited by: Benjamin Weill
- Music by: Klaus Badelt
- Production companies: Jerico; TF1 Films; Wild Bunch
- Distributed by: Mars Distribution
- Release date: 3 December 2008 (France)
- Running time: 96 minutes
- Country: France
- Language: French
- Budget: $3,000,000
- Box office: $6,548,942

Anything for Her (French: Pour elle) is a 2008 French thriller film starring Diane Kruger and Vincent Lindon, and is the directorial debut of Fred Cavayé. An American remake of the film, The Next Three Days, was released in 2010 and an Indian remake, Savi, was released in 2024.

== Plot ==
Julien and Lisa Aucler are a normal couple living happily with their infant son Oscar until one day, police storm into their apartment and arrest Lisa for murder. Then a cour d'assises sentences her to 20 years in prison.

Three years later, Julien continues to try to find proof that Lisa is innocent, but no new evidence has turned up, and all prior evidence continues to point to her as the prime suspect. The victim was her boss, with whom she had a heated argument on the day of the murder. The scene of the crime was a parking lot outside the office and the boss was killed by a blow to the forehead caused by a fire extinguisher, on which Lisa's fingerprints were found. It is revealed in a flashback that an unknown woman killed the boss and took her purse before walking away and bumping into Lisa. During the exchange, the boss' blood was smeared on Lisa's coat. She saw the fire extinguisher lying on the road in front of her car, so she picked it up and put it away before driving off, unaware that her boss lay dead on the parking slot beside her.

Seeing no other option, Julien turns to Henri Pasquet, a former criminal who has escaped from prison seven times and written a book about his escape methods. Pasquet explains to him that no prison is airtight and every one of them has a "key" that just has to be found. He also says that getting out is easy, but staying free is difficult, as most escapees make the mistake of running to their families or friends. With this, Pasquet advises the following to Julien: sever all family ties and flee from the country within hours, take flight from a foreign country's airport, choose the right identity for fake documents, go to a country with no ties to French communication, and have enough cash to last him and his family for several years. Back at home, Julien draws a mind map on the wall, using all of the ideas recorded from his conversation with Pasquet. For the next three months, he visits the prison, observing every security routine and looking for any irregular activity that would lead him to the "key". The mind map wall in his home is filled with photos and diagrams of the prison complex.

One day, he is informed by Dr. Gardes that Lisa, who is a diabetic, has refused to take her insulin for the past few days; because of this, he fears that she is attempting to commit suicide through this method. When Julien talks to her about this, she explains that she does not want to see Oscar unhappy every time they visit. That night, Julien goes into a bad neighborhood to acquire fake documents; however, he is mugged and robbed by two men posing as the dealers. Back at home, a biker pays him a visit and offers to have fake documents done in a week, risk-free, for €2,500. The papers are exchanged a week later without a hitch. As an addition to his plan, Julien steals Lisa's medical records from a delivery van. He also sells all of his furniture as a means to raise enough money for the getaway.

Julien is suddenly informed that Lisa is to be transferred to Rennes within three days. Desperate to have all of his funds ready, he makes an attempt to rob a bank, but turns away at the last minute. That night, he holds up a drug dealer, who leads him to a larger dealer named Martial Nashour. Julien recovers a large amount of money at the cost of Martial and the other dealer in a gunfight. The next day, Julien tears out the mind map from the wall and throws all of its contents away in a dumpster before leaving the apartment with Oscar. He then sneaks into the medical delivery van near the prison and plants an altered version of Lisa's records. He also abandons his car before renting a different car and staying at a hotel nearby with Oscar. Meanwhile, Dr. Gardes reads the medical records, forcing him to have Lisa transferred to the nearest hospital. At the same time, police investigate the scene of Martial's death and discover a piece of taillight from Julien's car. They see the connection and have officers head toward the hospital, knowing that Julien will be there.

At the hospital, Julien enters Lisa's room and has the guards disarmed while he retrieves his wife. They return to the hotel room, where Lisa is reunited with Oscar. The family then leaves France and arrives at Liège Airport in Belgium. Back at a police precinct, Julien's mind map is reassembled from the garbage recovered, but detectives decide it is too late to continue their pursuit, as the Auclers have fled to San Salvador.

== Cast ==
- Vincent Lindon as Julien Aucler
- Diane Kruger as Lisa Aucler
- Lancelot Roch as Oscar Aucler
- Liliane Rovère as Julien's mother
- Olivier Perrier as Julien's father
- Thierry Godard as Pascal Aucler
- Olivier Marchal as Henri Pasquet
- Hammou Graïa as Commandant Susini
- Rémi Martin as Capitaine Jousseaume
- Frédéric Maranber as Dr. Gardes
- Moussa Maaskri as Martial Nashour
- Joseph Beddelem as Hassan
- Alaa Oumouzoune as Moussa
- Dorothée Tavernier as Nathalie

== Production ==
The filming schedule encompassed several locations in Europe. These included Liège in Belgium, Meaux a commune in the Seine-et-Marne department in the Île-de-France region, Paris as well as Spain.

== Reception ==
As of June 2020, the review-aggregation website Rotten Tomatoes gives the film a score of 81% based on reviews from 31 critics, and a weighted average of 6.5 out of 10. The website's critical consensus states, "This taut and snappy French prison break thriller may be suspiciously implausible, but is held together by two fine central performances."

The Telegraph praised the film's pace; "This French thriller hurtles along with hardly a pause...The dangers of being out of your depth in criminal dealings give Fred Cavayé's film plenty of pulse and urgency". The Observer described it as a "gripping" thriller and continued "The movie invites the audience to empathise with a decent man driven by despair into dangerous criminal activities and we're on his side from start to finish."

== Remakes ==
An American remake, entitled The Next Three Days, was released on November 19, 2010. It stars Russell Crowe, Elizabeth Banks and Liam Neeson, and is directed by Paul Haggis.

An Indian remake, entitled Savi, was released on May 31, 2024, with a female protagonist portrayed by Divya Khosla Kumar. Directed by Abhinay Deo, it also stars Harshvardhan Rane and Anil Kapoor in supporting roles.
