= Black Box (2021 film) =

French-Belgian mystery thriller film by Yann Gozlan

- French: Boîte noire
- Directed by: Yann Gozlan
- Screenplay by: Yann Gozlan; Simon Moutaïrou; Nicolas Bouvet-Levrard; Jérémie Guez (collaboration)
- Produced by: Wassim Béji; Thibault Gast; Matthias Weber
- Starring: Pierre Niney; Lou de Laâge; André Dussollier
- Cinematography: Pierre Cottereau
- Edited by: Valentin Féron
- Music by: Philippe Rombi
- Production companies: WY Productions; 2425 Films; StudioCanal; France 2 Cinéma; Panache Productions; La Compagnie Cinématographique; Proximus; VOO; BE TV
- Distributed by: StudioCanal (France); Anga Distribution (Belgium)
- Release dates: 5 March 2021 (Alliance Française French Film Festival); 8 September 2021 (France); 8 September 2021 (Belgium)
- Running time: 129 minutes
- Countries: France; Belgium
- Language: French
- Box office: US$9.7 million

Black Box (French: Boîte noire, pronounced [bwat nwaʁ]) is a 2021 French-Belgian mystery thriller film directed by Yann Gozlan. It is a co-production between France and Belgium. The film stars Pierre Niney as a talented young black box analyst at the Bureau of Enquiry and Analysis for Civil Aviation Safety who is tasked with investigating a mysterious fatal plane crash.

The film had its world premiere at the Alliance Française French Film Festival on 5 March 2021. It was theatrically released in France and Belgium on 8 September 2021. It received five nominations at the 47th César Awards.

== Plot ==
An Atrian 800 aircraft mysteriously crashes over the French Alps, killing all on board. Mathieu Vasseur, an air safety investigator at the Bureau of Enquiry and Analysis for Civil Aviation Safety, is given the task of analysing the cockpit voice recorder. He identifies the sound of someone forcing his way into the cockpit shortly before the crash, leading him to suspect a terrorist attack. He announces his findings at a hastily called press conference.

Mathieu's boss, Victor Pollock, goes missing, so Mathieu is given the job of producing the final report into the crash. After detecting inconsistencies in the voice recorder and a voicemail message recorded by a passenger just before the crash, he reconsiders his terrorist theory, but his doubts are dismissed by Philippe Rénier, the head of the agency.

Mathieu gets Pollock's home address from an envelope on Pollock's desk. Driving out to the house, he finds it closed-up and unoccupied. Mathieu breaks a window and enters the house and finds little of interest. He grabs the keys to Pollock's vehicle and removes the SD card from the dashcam. Footage shows that, a few days before the crash, Pollock had a late-night roadside meeting with Xavier Renaud, who runs Pegase Security, a firm which develops on-board communication systems for aircraft. This leads Mathieu to suspect a cover-up.

A pilot tells Mathieu that the Atrian 800 had unresolved problems with the rudder's anti-stall system, but still received an air-worthiness certificate. Mathieu surreptitiously downloads the relevant test flight data from a computer belonging to his wife, Noémie, who works for Atrian.

Noémie is suspended after her bosses at Atrian discover the loss of the data. She angrily confronts Mathieu, accusing him of ruining her career. Mathieu persuades Rénier to use the flight data to run simulations on the anti-stall system, but these fail to reveal any problems. As Mathieu becomes increasingly obsessed with the investigation, threatening his mental health, Rénier transfers him to other duties.

An investigative journalist from Mediapart, Caroline Delmas, tells Mathieu about a man named David Keller, a former Pegase employee who was arrested for attempting to hack an aircraft's communication systems. Mathieu learns that Keller was on board the doomed Atrian 800.

As Mathieu prepares to hand over his files to a colleague prior to his transfer, he realizes one of them has been modified by Pollock. The new version contains GPS coordinates, which he traces to a pond behind Pollock's house. There he discovers the original voice recorder from the crashed plane. He uses equipment in Pollock's house to analyse the recording, and thus discovers the truth about the crash (which is shown in a flashback). On board the doomed plane, Keller used a laptop to take control of the aircraft's systems, not because he wanted it to crash but to demonstrate faults in the Pegase systems. But the hack goes wrong, and neither he nor the pilots are able to regain control, thus causing the aircraft to come down.

At the end of the recording, Pollock appears in a video. He confesses to tampering with the voice recorder, having been blackmailed by Renaud into covering up faults in the Pegase systems. As he watches the video, Mathieu becomes aware of two men entering the house, apparently looking for him. He flees, but not before sending the recording and the video to Noémie. As he drives away at speed, he loses control of his car in a manner that suggests that the car's control systems have been hacked in a way similar to those of the crashed plane. The vehicle crashes into a tree and Mathieu is killed instantly.

When Renaud gives a presentation at the Paris Air Show, Noémie patches the video of Pollock's confession into the show's audio-visual system, where it is seen by an audience of industry leaders and journalists. At the same time, the news breaks out in the media. As Noémie walks away from the presentation, police arrest Renaud.

== Cast ==
- Pierre Niney as Mathieu Vasseur
- Lou de Laâge as Noémie Vasseur
- André Dussollier as Philippe Rénier
- Sébastien Pouderoux as Xavier Renaud
- Olivier Rabourdin as Victor Pollock
- Guillaume Marquet as Antoine Balsan
- Mehdi Djaadi as Samir
- Anne Azoulay as Caroline Delmas
- Aurélien Recoing as Claude Varins
- André Marcon as Dorval
- Marie Dompnier as Pauline
- Philippe Maymat as Captain
- Quentin d'Hainaut as Security Guard
- Lorène Devienne as Jeanne
- Grégori Derangère as Alain Roussin

== Production ==
=== Development ===
Director and co-writer Yann Gozlan is a civil aviation enthusiast and had wanted to make a film on the subject for a long time: "This universe, incredibly cinematic from my perspective, with colossal financial stakes, where divergent interests co-exist (aircraft manufacturers, airlines, pilots...), seemed to me like an original and exciting setting for a film".

In preparation for his role, Pierre Niney spent several weeks working alongside agents from the Bureau of Enquiry and Analysis for Civil Aviation Safety (BEA): "There, I ended up finding an investigator with a profile similar to that of Mathieu. From there, as usual, I did a kind of journalistic work: I shadowed him, I spoke with him and asked his permission to film him so that I could find inspiration in his gestures, his way of working and his speed on the computer. The job of an acoustician is very technical, it was important to be able to replicate the details with precision".

=== Filming ===
Filming began on 9 September 2019 in the Paris region. In October 2019, filming was reported to have taken place at Epinay Studios in Épinay-sur-Seine. That same month, the city hall of Cergy was used as a production space.

For the reception scene organized by ENAC Alumni, the film team called on real graduates of the École nationale de l'aviation civile.

== Release ==
The film had its world premiere at the 32nd Alliance Française French Film Festival in Australia on 5 March 2021. It was theatrically released in France by Studiocanal on 8 September 2021, being simultaneously released in Belgium by Anga Distribution. International sales were handled by Studiocanal. Distrib Films gave the film a limited theatrical release in the United States, first at the Village East by Angelika in New York City on 29 April 2022, followed by Laemmle Glendale in California on 6 May 2022.

== Reception ==
=== Box office ===
The film was a major success in France, where it sold 1.2 million admissions, grossing a domestic total of US$9.4 million and a worldwide total of US$9.7 million.

=== Critical response ===
Black Box received an average rating of 3.8 out of 5 stars on the French website AlloCiné, based on 33 reviews. On Rotten Tomatoes, the film holds an approval rating of 94% based on 18 reviews, with an average rating of 7.3/10.

Le Monde published a positive review of the film, writing, "If the nature of the conspiracy that the hero faces is perhaps a little too obvious, the film is nevertheless distinguished by the qualities of a narrative that skillfully keeps the viewer in suspense".

=== Accolades ===
Award	Date of ceremony	Category	Recipient(s)	Result	Ref.
César Awards	25 February 2022	Best Actor	Pierre Niney	Nominated	
César Awards	25 February 2022	Best Original Screenplay	Yann Gozlan, Simon Moutaïrou, Nicolas Bouvet-Levrard	Nominated	
César Awards	25 February 2022	Best Editing	Valentin Féron	Nominated	
César Awards	25 February 2022	Best Sound	Nicolas Provost, Nicolas Bouvet-Levrard, and Marc Doisne	Nominated	
César Awards	25 February 2022	Best Original Music	Philippe Rombi	Nominated	
Jakarta Film Week	21 November 2021	Global Feature Award	Black Box	Nominated	
Reims Polar	30 May 2021	Prix du public	Black Box	Won	

== Remake ==
In December 2025, Netflix purchased remake rights and attached Tim Fehlbaum to direct.
