= Just a Breath Away =

- French: Dans la brume
- Directed by: Daniel Roby
- Written by: Guillaume Lemans
- Produced by: Guillaume Colboc; Nicolas Duval Adassovsky; Christian Larouche
- Starring: Romain Duris; Olga Kurylenko; Fantine Harduin; Michel Robin
- Cinematography: Pierre-Yves Bastard
- Edited by: Stan Collet; Yvann Thibaudeau
- Music by: Michel Corriveau
- Distributed by: Les Films Séville (Canada); Mars Films (France)
- Release date: April 4, 2018 (France)
- Running time: 89 minutes
- Countries: Canada; France
- Language: French

Just a Breath Away (French: Dans la brume) is a Canadian-French co-produced science-fiction thriller film directed by Daniel Roby and released in 2018. The film stars Romain Duris and Olga Kurylenko as Mathieu and Anna, parents trying to protect their daughter (Fantine Harduin) from a toxic gas cloud that is enveloping Paris.

The film was released in France on April 4, 2018. It screened on opening night at the Fantasia International Film Festival.

== Plot ==
Sarah, a young Parisian girl, lives in a hermetically sealed medical capsule due to a rare autoimmune syndrome described as a “total allergy”. Her parents, scientists Mathieu and Anna, have devoted years to finding a cure. After Mathieu returns from Canada with news of a potential breakthrough, an apparent earthquake strikes Paris and a dense, lethal gas begins seeping from the ground. The fumes kill anyone who inhales them, but the gas is heavier than air and settles at street level. Mathieu and Anna take shelter in the top-floor apartment of their elderly neighbours, Lucien and Colette, while Sarah remains in the family apartment below, kept alive by her capsule’s air filtration system running on limited battery power.

To keep Sarah’s capsule functioning, Mathieu makes dangerous trips through the gas-filled building to gather oxygen equipment and supplies. Venturing outside, he encounters soldiers escorting masked survivors toward Montmartre, which rises above the gas. Mathieu refuses to evacuate without Anna and Sarah, but a soldier provides him with extra masks and oxygen before departing. Back at the apartment, Mathieu realises the gas is continuing to rise.

As conditions worsen and violence breaks out among survivors in Montmartre, Mathieu and Anna decide to relocate Sarah to the hillside home of Charlotte, a friend of Sarah’s who shares the same syndrome and has a capsule of her own. To transport Sarah safely, they set out for a laboratory to obtain a sealed protective suit. During the journey they are separated when Mathieu falls into the Seine while fleeing a dog, but they reunite at the laboratory and recover a suit. An explosion damages Mathieu’s equipment, forcing the couple to share oxygen as they reach a building above the gas. With Anna’s supply too low for both of them to return, she heads back alone with the suit while Mathieu attempts to make his way across rooftops. Searching for additional supplies, he breaks into an upper-level car park and is confronted by a policeman guarding the stockpile; Mathieu kills him to escape with oxygen.

Anna reaches the apartment as her oxygen runs out and discovers the suit has been compromised. When Sarah’s capsule battery fails, Anna attempts to replace it but collapses in the gas-filled stairwell. Mathieu returns to find Anna dead. As the gas rises into the apartment and Lucien and Colette resign themselves to death, Mathieu prepares a last attempt to save Sarah, retrieving a hazmat suit from a crashed vehicle and a scooter to return quickly.

On his way back, Mathieu crashes after nearly colliding with an unmasked boy walking through the gas. When he regains consciousness, he sees Sarah outside her capsule and unaffected by the fumes, accompanied by the boy, Noé, who shares her condition. Mathieu realises the gas does not harm those with the syndrome and reunites with Sarah. He later awakens inside a medical capsule, with Sarah now caring for him.

== Cast ==
- Romain Duris as Mathieu
- Olga Kurylenko as Anna
- Fantine Harduin as Sarah
- Michel Robin as Lucien
- Anna Gaylor as Colette

== Reception ==
On the review aggregator website Rotten Tomatoes, the film has an approval rating of 50%, based on 12 reviews.

== Accolades ==
The film received eight nominations at the 7th Canadian Screen Awards in 2019, including for Best Motion Picture.

| Award | Date of ceremony | Category | Recipient(s) | Result | Ref(s) |
|---|---|---|---|---|---|
| Canadian Screen Awards | March 31, 2019 | Best Motion Picture | Christian Larouche, Guillaume Colboc, Nicolas Duval Adassovsky | Nominated | |
| Canadian Screen Awards | March 31, 2019 | Best Director | Daniel Roby | Nominated | |
| Canadian Screen Awards | March 31, 2019 | Best Supporting Actor | Michel Robin | Nominated | |
| Canadian Screen Awards | March 31, 2019 | Best Original Screenplay | Guillaume Lemans | Nominated | |
| Canadian Screen Awards | March 31, 2019 | Best Overall Sound | Bernard Gariépy Strobl | Nominated | |
| Canadian Screen Awards | March 31, 2019 | Best Sound Editing | Martin Pinsonnault | Nominated | |
| Canadian Screen Awards | March 31, 2019 | Best Makeup | Françoise Quilichini | Won | |
| Canadian Screen Awards | March 31, 2019 | Best Visual Effects | Benoit Brière, Bruno Maillard | Won | |
| Fantasia International Film Festival | July 2018 | Best Film | | Won | |
| Prix Iris | June 2, 2019 | Best Visual Effects | Aurélia Abate, Delphine Lasserre, Bruno Maillard, Benoît Brière, Louis-Philippe Clavet, Valérie Garcia, Étienne Rodrigue | Won | |

== See more ==
- Backbone
