= Caged (2010 film) =

- Directed by: Yann Gozlan
- Written by: Yann Gozlan; Guillaume Lemans
- Produced by: Alain Benguigui; Thomas Verhaeghe
- Starring: Zoe Felix; Éric Savin; Arie Elmaleh; Ivan Franek; Igor Skreblin
- Cinematography: Vincent Mathias
- Edited by: Gregoire Sivan
- Music by: Guillaume Feyler
- Production company: Sombrero Productions
- Distributed by: BAC Films
- Release date: August 20, 2010 (Fantasy Filmfest)
- Running time: 83 minutes
- Country: France
- Language: French
- Box office: $190,312

Caged (French: Captifs) is a 2010 French horror film directed and co-written by Yann Gozlan and it is based on a true story. The film is about a woman named Carole who is traumatized after seeing her friend Laura being killed by a dog twenty years ago. Carole works as an aid worker in former Yugoslavia and begins to leave from Kosovo with two co-workers, when she is kidnapped by a Serbian gang of masked men who deal with human organ trafficking.

== Plot ==
The film begins with a scene from Carole's childhood. She plays hide and seek with her friend Laura. When Carole goes looking for Laura, she finds her dead in a garage. She had been killed by a dog. The same dog tries to attack Carole, but she is able to hide in a car.

Carole, and her fellow doctors Samir and Mathias, work as volunteers in the former territory of Yugoslavia. After working there for a few months, they travel back to France together. Because of a roadblock, they take a detour and a short time later they are captured by masked men with weapons. When trying to escape, Mathias is shot in the leg, but he is treated immediately at their destination. Nevertheless, they are locked in a cellar. Samir and Carole share a cell that is only equipped with a toilet and a mattress, while Mathias is locked in a cell opposite. They don't know who kidnapped them or why they were kidnapped. They discovered that there are other cells in the basement, and at least one man is also trapped in the cellar.

The days go by, and they are given food, and a doctor examines them occasionally, but because they don't speak the same language, they are unable to learn any new information. One day, Samir is suddenly taken by the kidnappers. A short time later they drive past the cells and see Samir's corpse, from which the eyes and other organs have been removed. Carole and Mathias realise that the kidnappers are organ dealers. Mathias manages to remove the lattice window with a converted mattress spring, but his attempt to escape fails because the kidnappers notice him. As a consequence, you weld the window shut to a metal plate.

Carole is taken to the surgery room, where the doctor tries to remove her eyes, but she manages to free her hand and stabs the doctor with a scalpel. Carole then gets a bolt cutter while she has to walk through a room with chained dogs, causing her to face her childhood fears. When she enters an apartment above the basement, she meets a stout woman. A duel breaks out, and Carole drowns the woman in a bowl.

She frees Mathias and a girl named Ana. When one of the kidnappers returns, Mathias kills him with the bolt cutter. Then Carole, Mathias and Ana run into the forest. The bandits notice the escape and free three dogs. Mathias can no longer keep up with Carole and Ana due to his gunshot wound and remains behind. He kills one dog with a stick, but the two other dogs kill him. Carole tells Ana to run into a nearby cornfield while she draws the dogs herself. When the dogs attack Carole, she falls to the ground and sees a string that belongs to a grenade. When the dogs loosen the cord, the grenade explodes and kills them, whereas Carole is only briefly unable to hear.

Carole runs into the cornfield while two men run after them. One man is armed with a rifle. The other finds Ana and pulls her out of the field, but Carole kills him with a stone. When they lie down on the ground to hide from the last kidnapper, he first walks past them. But then he sees the two of them running away and shoots Carole in the stomach. When he finally tries to finish her off, she grabs a piece of wood, rams it in his foot, takes his rifle and shoots him in the head. Finally, Carole and Ana are transported away by two soldiers. Ana serves to remind Carole of her childhood friend, Laura.

== Cast ==
- Zoe Felix as Carole
- Éric Savin as Mathias
- Arie Elmaleh as Samir
- Ivan Franek as Ferrailleur 1
- Igor Skreblin as Ferrailleur 2
- Margaux Guenier as Ana
- Philippe Krhajac as Le médecin
- Jana Bitternova as La soeur des ferrailleurs
- Clara Barbosa as Carole enfant
- Typhaine Hilaire as Laura
- Thais Fischer as La fillette sur la balançoire
- Goran Kostic as Le Serb prisonnier
- Eric Kailey as Militaire ONU
- Sacha Mijovic as Le conducteur du van

== Release ==
Caged was shown at Fantasy Filmfest on August 20, 2010. It was also shown in a competition at the 2010 Sitges Film Festival. Caged did not have strong box office returns in Europe.

== Reception ==
Le Monde gave the film one star out of four, noting that the captives are no more sympathetic than their torturers. L'Express gave the film one star out of four calling it a "predictable thriller". Paris Match gave the film two stars, praising the film's star Zoe Felix. Chronic'art gave the film a one star rating, noting that the pace of the film is lost but praised the Felix's acting.
