= Savi (film) =

- Theatrical release poster
- Directed by: Abhinay Deo
- Written by: Adapted Screenplay: Parveez Shaikh; Aseem Arora; Dialogues: Aseem Arora
- Story by: Fred Cavayé
- Based on: Anything for Her by Fred Cavayé
- Produced by: Mukesh Bhatt; Bhushan Kumar; Krishan Kumar
- Starring: Divya Khosla Kumar; Anil Kapoor; Harshvardhan Rane
- Cinematography: Chinmay Salaskar
- Edited by: Shaan Mohammad
- Music by: Vishal Mishra; Javed-Mohsin; Piyush Shanker; Arkadeep Karmakar
- Production companies: T-Series Films; Vishesh Entertainment; HWY 61
- Distributed by: AA Films
- Release date: 31 May 2024
- Running time: 122 minutes
- Country: India
- Language: Hindi
- Budget: est. ₹20 crore
- Box office: est. ₹17.81 crore

Savi is a 2024 Indian Hindi-language action thriller film directed by Abhinay Deo and produced by Mukesh Bhatt, Bhushan Kumar and Krishan Kumar under the banner of Vishesh Films and T-Series Films. The film stars Divya Khossla, Anil Kapoor, and Harshvardhan Rane.

Inspired by the tale of Savitri and Satyavan, it tells the story of a simple housewife who attempts to jailbreak her husband from a high-security prison in England. It is a remake of 2008 French film Anything for Her and was released on 31 May 2024 to predominantly positive reviews. The plot follows a wife who takes extreme measures to break her husband out of prison after he is wrongfully convicted for the murder of his boss.

== Plot ==
Nakul Sachdeva and Savitri Sachdeva (Savi) are an Indian couple living in Liverpool with their son Adi. They lead a happy and peaceful life, with Savi being a housewife, while Nakul works as a construction worker. Nakul has a bad relationship with his boss Stephanie Fowler, who is racist and often humiliates him.

One morning, police arrive, accusing Nakul of murdering his boss Stephanie. Nakul is found guilty and sentenced for life despite pleading not guilty. Savi believes he is innocent though the evidence against Nakul is strong: his fingerprint is on the murder weapon (a fire extinguisher), Stephanie's blood is on his clothes, and he has motive because Stephanie hates him. Nakul narrates a different story: he was passing by the crime scene when he bumped into an unknown man. Stephanie's blood was all over the murderer's clothes and the bump left drops on Nakul's coat. He then saw the fire extinguisher on the road so he placed it back, leaving his fingerprint on it. Nakul claims he remembers he heard a clothes button falling on the ground when the two bumped into each other, so if the button can be found, his narrative shall be proved. However, no evidence is found.

The couple's appeal is also rejected due to lack of evidence. Hope diminishes with time going by. Savi enters financial difficulty as she has no source of income and cannot find a job. She decides to break Nakul out of jail. She visits Joydeep Paul, a notorious criminal who has successfully escaped from jail seven times, for help. Paul suggests the following: arrange fake passports, prepare money, choose a destination that has no extradition treaty with the UK, break him out and flee. Savi begins her planning.

Meanwhile, in jail, Nakul is bullied by a drug smuggling ring. They assault him and are put in solitary confinement for one month. They threaten to kill him once they get out unless Nakul withdraws his complaint against them. Nakul refuses. His attackers are about to be released from solitary confinement in three days, making Savi realise she has only three days to execute her plan.

Savi has no other choice to arrange for money in such a short time, so she robs two drug dealers; the ensuing gunfight results in the death of the drug dealers. Police find Savi the suspect and begin the search for her.

A medical team visits the jail everyday to collect the blood samples of all prisoners to monitor their health. Savi sneaks into the medical team's truck and switches Nakul's report with a fake one that says he needs to be hospitalised. The jail sends him to the hospital, where Savi forcefully takes him away at gunpoint. They escape the hospital, and police begin their search.

Police find papers detailing Savi's jailbreak plan at her home. They conclude that the couple is about to fly from Manchester Airport to Marrakesh with fake passports. They rush to Manchester to stop them. However, at the airport, they find out that there is no flight to Marrakesh and the two never showed up to the airport. They realize the couple has left by ferry. Savi had intentionally misled them.

Impressed by Savi's determination and ability to carry out such a big plan, Officer Ayesha Hassan decides to revisit the crime scene of Stephanie's murder to find out why Savi is so motivated. At the scene, she finds a button in the sewer, indicating that Nakul is indeed innocent.

In Chandigarh, India, Nakul's father receives an invitation from Savi in Bulgaria, revealing that they are now settled there.

Joydeep Paul gets arrested by the police for abetting Savi and her family's escape just as he is about to start a story named Savitri.

== Cast ==
- Divya Khosla Kumar as Savitri "Savi" Sachdeva
- Anil Kapoor as Joydeep Paul
- Harshvardhan Rane as Nakul Sachdeva
- Raageshwari Loomba as Simrit
- Mairaj Kakkar as Aditya Sachdev
- Himanshi Choudhry as Ayesha Hassan
- M. K. Raina as Nakul's Father
- Hadelin de Ponteves as Rox
- Jacob Medows as Slim Jim
- Jane Horn as Stephanie Fowler
- Promila Thomas as Simrit’s Mom
- Ollie Booth as Detective John
- Alex Dower as Detective Stevens
- Supreet Bedi as Anu
- Adrian Stretton as Detective Lucus
- Tino Mung as Drug cooker

== Production ==
Announcement of the film came in May 2024, titled Savi - A Bloody Housewife, which is a remake of 2008 French film Anything for Her. The film would be directed by Abhinay Deo, and will feature Divya Khosla, Anil Kapoor, and Harshvardhan Rane. The film is produced by Mukesh Bhatt, Bhushan Kumar, and Krishan Kumar. Deo cast Kapoor in the film after working with him on the television series 24.

The film was filmed in secrecy in London. The entire filming took place in 45 days.

== Soundtrack ==
Savi

Soundtrack album by Vishal Mishra, Piyush Shankar, Javed-Mohsin and Arkadeep Karmakar
- Released: 28 May 2024
- Recorded: 2022–2024
- Genre: Feature film soundtrack
- Length: 28:25
- Language: Hindi
- Label: T Series

Official audio
- Savi - Full Album on YouTube

The music for the film is composed by Vishal Mishra, Piyush Shankar, Javed-Mohsin and Arkadeep Karmakar; lyrics are written by Raj Shekhar, Rashmi Virag and Ritajaya Banerjee.

The song "Vada Humse Karo" is the last song sung by singer KK, who died a week after recording it.

The first single from the album, "Hum Dum", was released on 10 May 2024.

Track listing
No.	Title	Lyrics	Music	Singer(s)	Length
1.	"Humdum"	Raj Shekhar	Vishal Mishra	Vishal Mishra	3:20
2.	"Vada Humse Karo"	Rashmi Virag	Piyush Shankar	KK	3:30
3.	"Khol Pinjra"	Ritajaya Banerjee	Arkadeep Karmakar	Sunidhi Chauhan	3:08
4.	"Vada Humse Karo (Version 2)"	Rashmi Virag	Piyush Shankar	KK	3:25
5.	"Paas Tere Main"	Rashmi Virag	Javed-Mohsin	Jubin Nautiyal, Shreya Ghoshal	5:05
6.	"Vada Humse Karo (Sad Version)"	Rashmi Virag	Piyush Shankar	Piyush Shankar	2:39
7.	"Vada Humse Karo (Reprise)"	Rashmi Virag	Piyush Shankar	Piyush Shankar	3:48
8.	"O Yaarum"	Ritajaya Banerjee	Arkadeep Karmakar	Shreya Ghoshal	3:30
Total length:					28:25

== Release ==
The film was released in theatres on 31 May 2024, clashed with Mr. & Mrs. Mahi.

The film premiered on Netflix from 26 July 2024 and reached Netflix's global top non-English language film chart in 14 countries, including Singapore, Malaysia, Oman, Qatar, and the UAE, among others.

== Reception ==
A critic for Bollywood Hungama rated the film 3.5 stars out of 5 and wrote, "Savi works due to the plot, performances and an engaging second half."

Saibal Chatterjee of NDTV rated 2 stars and wrote, "Anil Kapoor manages to be one of the bright spots of Harshvardhan Rane, Divya Khossla's Film."

Sujay B M of Deccan Herald gave a rating of 4/5 and wrote, "Similar to the Taken series and the Dhrishyam movies (originally Malayalam), the idea of protecting the family, even at the cost of antagonising the law, strikes a chord with the audience. With gripping emotional scenes, witty dialogues and a riveting climax, Savi keeps the audience glued to their seats. Titas Chowdury of News 18 gave a rating 3.5/5 and wrote, "Savi: A Bloody Housewife will perhaps start a new chapter for Divya Khossla, the actor. Though predictable, it definitely deserves a watch for its fresh treatment and sincere attempt at being a clutter-breaker." "

Vinamra Mathura of Firstpost gave a rating 2.5/5 and wrote, "Anil Kapoor is the highlight of this Divya Khossla-Harshvardhan Rane thriller". Abishek Srivastava of The Times of India rated 3/5 and wrote, "While Savi makes an honest attempt to offer something new in this genre, it ultimately fails to reach the finish line."
