= Based on a True Story (film) =

2017 film

- Theatrical release poster
- Directed by: Roman Polanski
- Written by: Olivier Assayas; Roman Polanski
- Produced by: Wassim Béji
- Starring: Eva Green; Emmanuelle Seigner
- Cinematography: Paweł Edelman
- Edited by: Margot Meynier
- Music by: Alexandre Desplat
- Distributed by: Mars Films (France); Monolith Films (Poland)
- Release dates: 27 May 2017 (Cannes); 1 November 2017 (France)
- Running time: 100 minutes
- Countries: France; Poland
- Language: French
- Budget: €12.96 million
- Box office: $3.9 million

Based on a True Story (French: D'après une histoire vraie) is a 2017 French-language psychological thriller film directed by Roman Polanski. The screenplay was written by Polanski and Olivier Assayas, adapted from the novel of the same name by Delphine de Vigan. It was screened out of competition at the 2017 Cannes Film Festival. It became a box-office bomb, grossing $3.9 million worldwide against a production budget of €12.96 million.

== Plot ==
The film focuses on writer Delphine (Seigner), who has achieved her first career success, publishing a debut novel dedicated to her mother. However, she soon starts receiving anonymous letters accusing her of exposing her family to the public. Depressed and struggling with writer's block, Delphine meets and begins a friendship with a mysterious younger woman (Green) who is seductive, intelligent, and intuitive, and who understands Delphine better than anyone else.

== Cast ==
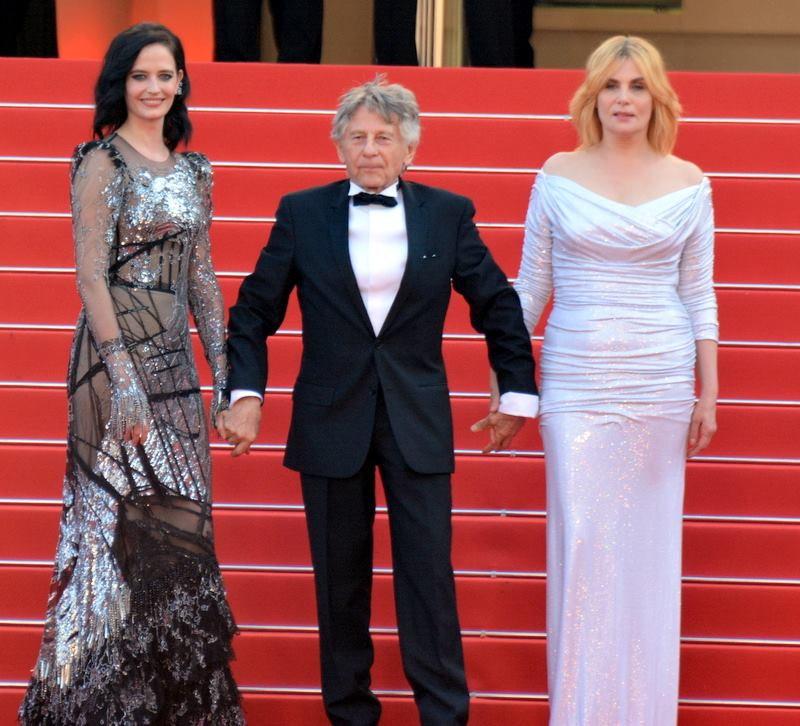
Green, Polanski, and Seigner, promoting the film at the 2017 Cannes Film Festival.

- Emmanuelle Seigner as Delphine Dayrieux
- Eva Green as Elle
- Vincent Perez as François
- Dominique Pinon as Raymond
- Camille Chamoux as Oriane
- Brigitte Roüan as The documentalist
- Josée Dayan as Karina
- Noémie Lvovsky as The inspector
- Damien Bonnard as The perchman
- Paul Garcia as Homme Salon Dur
- Veronique Vasseur
- Anouchka Csernakova
- Saadia Bentaieb as Jeanne
- Elisabeth Quin as The Journalist
- Valerie de Monza
- Charlotte Mangel
- Edith Le Merdy as The Neighbor
- Leonello Brandolini

== Production ==
A large part of the film was shot in a studio in the Île-de-France region. The other half was shot in the Perche region, including at the lake of Chapelle-Royale and in a house located in the commune of Les Autels-Villevillon, both in the Eure-et-Loir department.

== Reception ==
It won the FIPRESCI Prize in 28th Stockholm Film Festival. On review aggregator website Rotten Tomatoes, the film holds an approval rating of 50% based on 30 reviews, and an average rating of 5.60/10. On Metacritic, the film has a weighted average score of 43 out of 100, based on 8 critics, indicating "mixed or average reviews".

== Release ==
Sony Pictures Classics acquired North American distribution rights to the film at the 67th Berlin International Film Festival in February 2017, prior to its premiere at the Cannes Film Festival in May. Sony Pictures Classics announced they would partner with RatPac Entertainment for the US theatrical release. However, after the MeToo movement gained global prominence that fall, Sony Pictures Classics was reported to have shelved the film, with no plans to release it in the United States.
