= Centauro (film) =

- Directed by: Daniel Calparsoro
- Screenplay by: Gaël Nouaille; Gemma Ventura
- Based on: Burn Out by Yann Gozlan
- Produced by: Gaël Nouaille; Laurent Baudens
- Starring: Àlex Monner; Begoña Vargas; Carlos Bardem; Édgar Vittorino; Patricia Vico
- Music by: Carlos Jean
- Production company: Borsalino Productions
- Distributed by: Netflix
- Release date: 15 June 2022
- Language: Spanish

Centauro, a 2022 action thriller film directed by Daniel Calparsoro, is a remake of the 2017 Yann Gozlan film Burn Out. It stars Àlex Monner, Begoña Vargas, Carlos Bardem, Patricia Vico and Édgar Vittorino.

== Plot ==
Seeking to settle a debt, wannabe pro biker Rafa decides to pledge his services to a criminal organization. However, he is torn between the two lives he is leading as an honest man in the morning and a courier at night. Eventually this double life takes a toll on him and he resorts to drugs, which affects his dream of being a pro racer. At last he understands that there is no way out from the crime life and with help of his friend he tries to escape the drug cartel but is identified by the police and offered the same job just on the side of law which he takes up as he realises that family is the most important thing.

== Cast ==
- Àlex Monner as Rafa
- Begoña Vargas as Natalia
- Carlos Bardem as Boro
- Patricia Vico as Regina
- Édgar Vittorino as Carlos
- David Cruz Barje
- Adrián Garín
- Sebastián Ciontescu
- Pedro Casablanc as Comisario García
- Dollar Semouni as Cortés
- Abraham Pérez as Mateo

== Production ==
A remake of the Yann Gozlan's film Burn Out, the screenplay was penned by Gaël Nouaille and Gemma Ventura. The film was produced by Borsalino Productions, with the collaboration of the Catalunya Film Commission, Gobierno de Aragón, Diputación de Teruel and Film Lonelylands. It was shot in the Spanish provinces of Barcelona and Teruel.

== Release ==
The film was released on Netflix on 15 June 2022.

== Reception ==
Raquel Hernández Luján of HobbyConsolas rated the "simple and efficient" film 70 out of 100 points ("good"), citing the "unstoppable" pace of the narration, the chase sequences and the ending among the best things about it, while drawing out "superfluous additions" detracting from the story, such as the street dance scene, as the worst elements of the film.
