= Wassim Béji =

French film producer

Wassim Béji (born February 25, 1977, in Paris) is a French film producer.

== Filmography ==
- De retour (short, 2005)
- Hell (2005)
- 24 Bars (2007)
- Asylum Blackout (2011)
- Headwinds (2011)
- Amitiés sincères (2011)
- Yves Saint Laurent (2014)
- A Perfect Man (2015)
- Iris (2016)
- Based on a True Story (2017)
- Burn Out (2017)
- Mr. Know-It-All (2018)
- Terrible Jungle (2020)
- Kandisha (2020)
- Black Box (2021)
- Fantômas: The New World (2027)
