= Yoann Bourgeois =

French Dancer and Artist

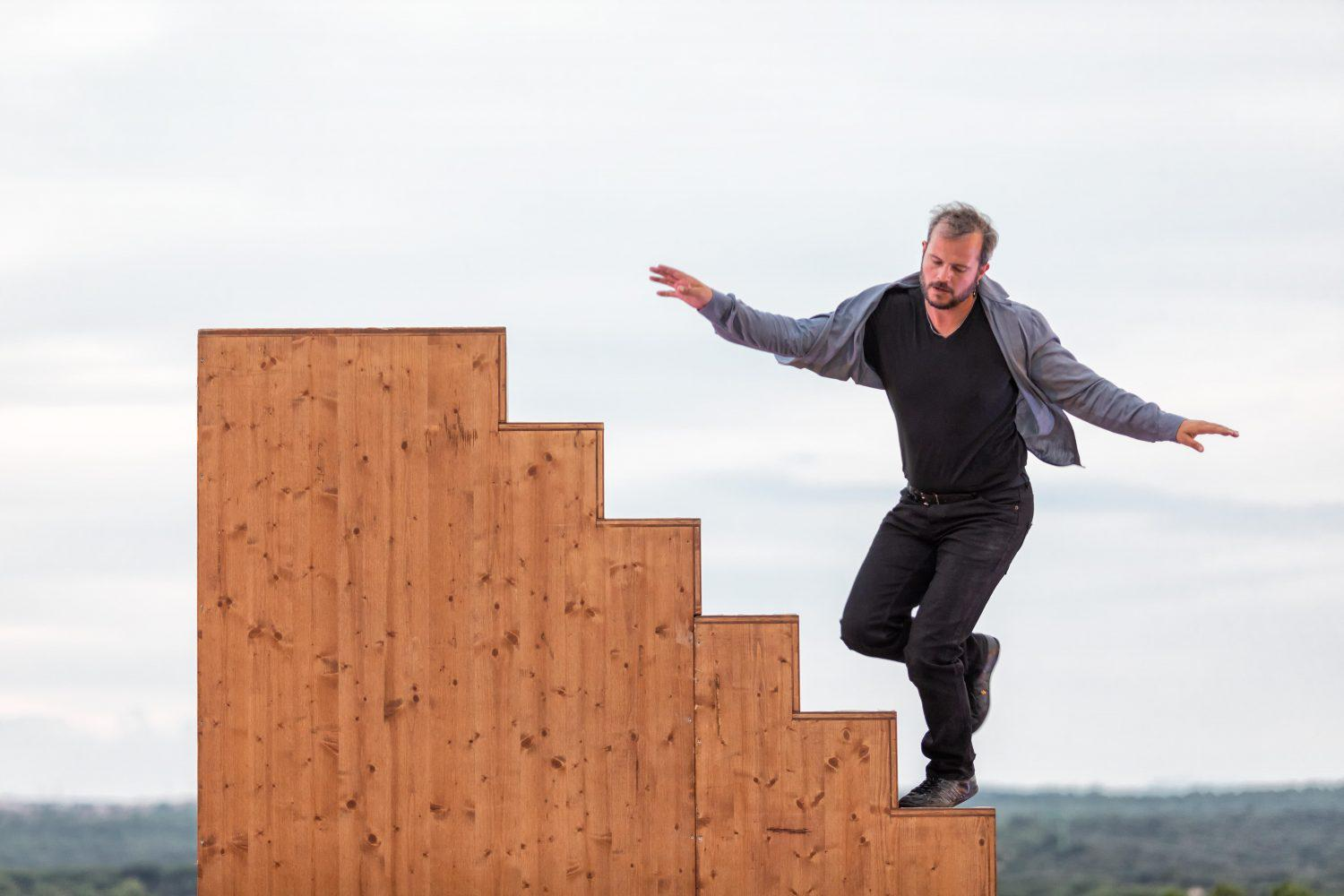
- Bourgeois allowing himself to fall from a set of stairs onto a trampoline during a performance in Madrid in 2018
- Born: 7 September 1981 (41 years); Jura, France
- Occupation: Dancer

Yoann Bourgeois is a French dancer, choreographer, and artist. He trained in circus arts at Châlons-en-Champagne. He directed the Compagnie Yoann Bourgeois touring dancing troupe. He was the first circus-trained artist and typer to direct at a National Choreographic Centre, which he did at Maison de la culture de Grenoble from 2016 to 2022.

The New Yorker described him as a "nouveau-cirque acrobat" and "droll, slapstick comedian," and Wesley Morris, in the New York Times, called him a "dramatist of physics".

== Performances and installations ==
- Celui qui tombe ("He Who Falls"), 2014. Installed later at Barbican, London, 2016; Tanz im August Berlin, 2016; and Centquatre-Paris, 2017, 2020.
- Minuit ("Midnight"), 2016. Brooklyn Academy of Music. Installed later at Théâtre de la Ville, 2017.
- La mécanique de l’Histoire ("The Mechanics of History"), Panthéon, Paris, 2017
- Clair de Lune, with Debussy's Clair de lune played on piano by Alexandre Tharaud, c. 2018
- Passants, 2018

== Controversy ==
In 2021, he was accused of plagiarising the work of multiple theatre artists throughout his career. He later denied that he plagiarised, stating ‘[what] is original is the treatment and the creative process’.
