= Visions (2023 film) =

2023 film by Yann Gozlan

- Theatrical release poster
- Directed by: Yann Gozlan
- Written by: Michel Fessler; Aurélie Valat; Jean-Baptiste Delafon; Yann Gozlan; Audrey Diwan (collaboration)
- Produced by: Éric Nebot; Thibault Gast; Matthias Weber
- Starring: Diane Kruger; Mathieu Kassovitz; Marta Nieto; Amira Casar; Grégory Fitoussi; Élodie Navarre
- Cinematography: Antoine Sanier
- Edited by: Valentin Féron
- Music by: Philippe Rombi
- Production companies: Eagles Team Entertainment; 24 25 Films; SND; France 2 Cinéma; Panache Productions; La Compagnie Cinématographique; Proximus; VOO; BE TV; RTBF
- Distributed by: SND
- Release dates: 24 August 2023 (Angoulême); 6 September 2023 (France)
- Running time: 123 minutes
- Countries: France; Belgium
- Language: French
- Box office: $1.3 million

Visions is a 2023 French psychological thriller film directed by Yann Gozlan. It stars Diane Kruger and Mathieu Kassovitz alongside Marta Nieto.

The film premiered on 24 August 2023 at the Angoulême Francophone Film Festival and was theatrically released in France by SND on 6 September 2023.

== Plot ==
Estelle is an airline captain who lives with her protective husband Guillaume. Her seemingly perfect life spirals out of control when her former flame, Ana, reappears and she begins an affair with her. When Ana suddenly disappears, she starts looking for her. At the same time, she is plagued by visions that interfere with her work as a pilot. When she causes a near-collision with another plane, blood is taken from her as part of the flight safety procedure. The results indicate anesthesia. Estelle suspects her husband of having sedated her and murdered Ana. Scraps of memory return, confirming this suspicion. She flees from the house and is hit by a car.

In hospital, the memory returns: after watching Ana having sex with another of her lovers, who is also the owner of the house, Estelle waited until the other women left the house. She discovers a camera that Ana had hidden to photograph her during her orgasm as part of her art work. Ana reacted condescendingly when Estelle confronted her. Estelle grabbed a stone and hit Ana's head, causing her death. When Estelle's husband arrived, he made the body disappear into the sea and injected her with an anesthetic, which has the side effect of causing memory lapses.

When Estelle realizes that she has accused her husband of a murder that she herself had committed, she reconciles with him and returns home with him from the hospital in a wheelchair. In the last scene she asks him to step by to a cliff, where they look to the sea watching a woman in a red bathing suit coming out of the water. The beginning scene of the movie shows her bathing at that location, coming out of the water and seeing two people on the cliff, one in a wheelchair.

== Cast ==
- Diane Kruger as Estelle
- Mathieu Kassovitz as Guillaume
- Marta Nieto as Ana
- Amira Casar as Johana Van Damaker
- Grégory Fitoussi as Marco
- Élodie Navarre as Charlotte

== Production ==
The screenplay was penned by Michel Fessler, Aurélie Valat, Jean-Baptiste Delafon, and Yann Gozlan with the collaboration of Audrey Diwan. It is based on an original idea by Fessler. The film was produced by Eagles Team Entertainment (Éric Nebot), 24 25 Films (Thibault Gast and Matthias Weber), SND and France 2 Cinéma, in co-production with Panache Productions, La Compagnie Cinématographique, Proximus, VOO, BE TV and RTBF.

Principal photography began on 30 May 2022 and was projected to last 11 weeks, wrapping on 18 August. Shooting locations included the Sainte-Croix Beach in Martigues. Filming also took place at the Nice Airport and in Toulon.

== Release ==
Visions was selected to be screened at the 16th Angoulême Francophone Film Festival, where it had its world premiere on 24 August 2023. The film was theatrically released in France on 6 September 2023 by SND. It was also screened on 2 October 2023 in the Gala Premieres section at the 2023 Zurich Film Festival, where Kruger was presented with the Golden Eye Award.

== Reception ==
Visions received an average rating of 3.0 out of 5 stars on the French website AlloCiné, based on 28 reviews.

Jean-Luc Wachthausen of Le Point wrote, "With her blonde grace, her false fragility, her fluid acting, Diane Kruger carries this psychological thriller on her shoulders." François Forestier of L'Obs echoed praise of Kruger's "superb" performance, and highlighted Gozlan's ability to "skilfully blur the tracks" of the narrative, comparing it to Alfred Hitchcock's style in Rebecca (1940). Éric Neuhoff of Le Figaro noted Kruger's "feverish" performance but panned the film, comparing it unfavourably to Alfred Hitchcock's Marnie (1964). Pierre Lunn of Première similarly praised Kruger and concluded, "If she does not completely excel, it is because the film does not give her the means". Jacques Morice of Télérama denounced the film as having "nothing really original or quite plausible", but enjoyed the addition of Marta Nieto.
