= Guillaume Lemans =

French screenwriter and film producer

Guillaume Lemans is a French screenwriter and film producer. He received a Canadian Screen Award nomination for Best Original Screenplay at the 7th Canadian Screen Awards in 2019 for Just a Breath Away (Dans la brume).

== Filmography ==
- Anything for Her (Pour elle) - 2008
- Beauties at War (La guerre des Miss) - 2008
- Caged (Captifs) - 2010
- Point Blank (À bout portant) - 2010
- Final Balance (Légitime Défense) - 2011
- Le Marquis (2011)
- Mea Culpa - 2014
- A Perfect Man (Un homme idéal) - 2015
- Burn Out - 2017
- Just a Breath Away (Dans la brume) - 2018
- The Night Eats the World (La nuit a dévoré le monde) - 2019
