= Hofesh Shechter =

Israeli- British choreographer, dancer and composer

Hofesh Shechter: Officer of the British Empire; Chevalier des Arts et des Lettres
- חופש שכטר
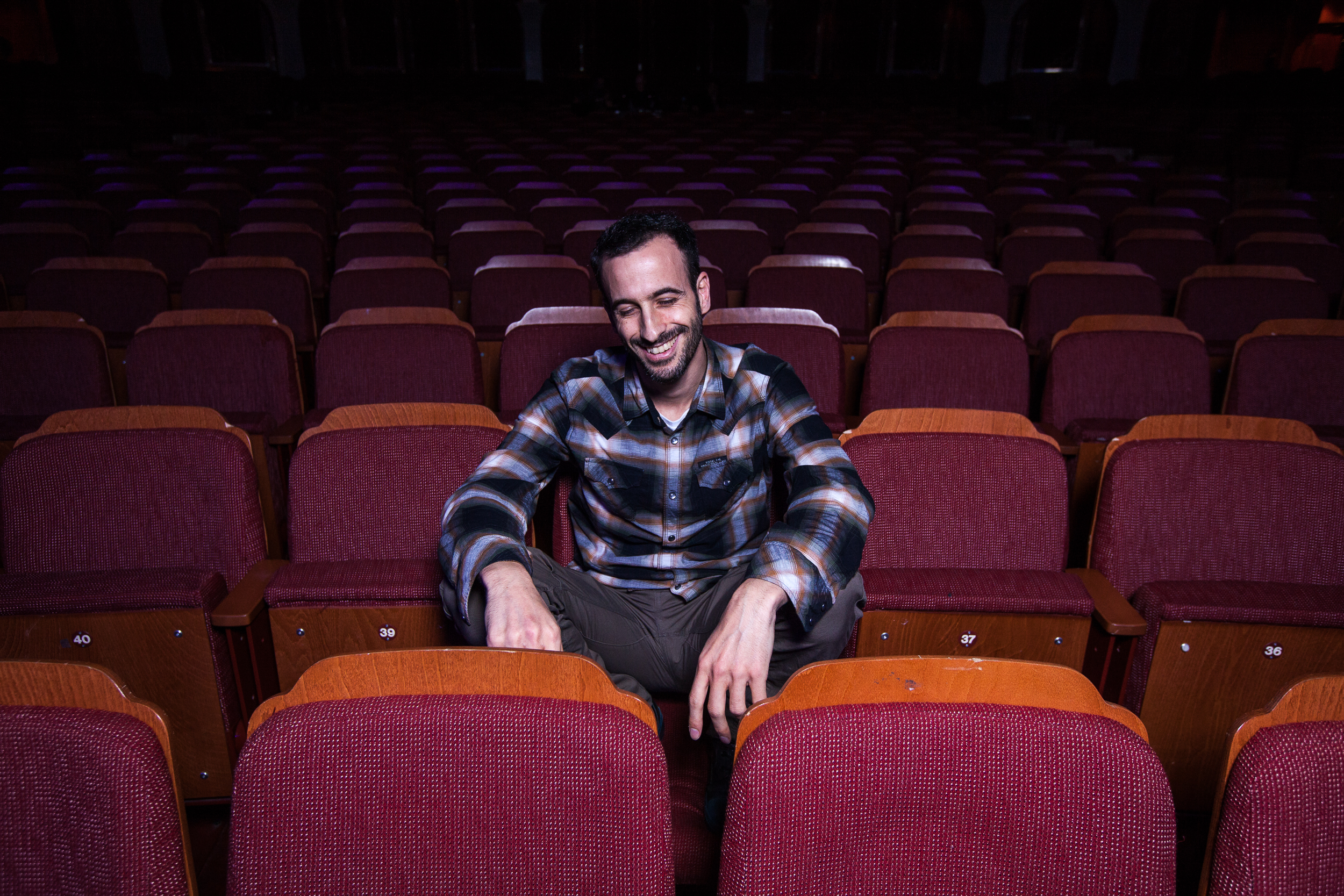
- Born: 3 May 1975 (age 51); Jerusalem, Israel
- Occupations: Choreographer, Composer, Filmmaker, Director and dancer
- Website: hofesh.co.uk

Hofesh Shechter OBE (Hebrew: חופש שכטר; born 3 May 1975) is a German, Israeli, British choreographer, dancer and composer based in London. He is the founder and artistic director of the Hofesh Shechter Company.

== Early life ==
Hofesh Shechter was born in Jerusalem, Israel, in 1975. At 6, Shechter began to study piano, later developing an interest in folk dance aged 12. At 15, he successfully auditioned for the Jerusalem Academy of Music and Dance as a pianist, but switched to dance upon his arrival, taking formal classes in ballet and modern dance.

== Career ==
Shechter studies in the school of the Jerusalem Academy for Music and Dance.

Whilst still training as a dancer, Shechter was conscripted into the Israel Defence Forces on his eighteenth birthday. He later described this experience as "like an electrical short circuit in my brain".

To preserve his dance career, Shechter was given a status of excellence in dance. He was given an evening clerical job in Tel Aviv and would train with Batsheva Ensamble (junior company) by day. Batsheva Dance Company

Shechter graduated to the main company, where he danced in works by Ohad Naharin and Wim Vandekeybus, amongst others, whilst also studying percussion. After three years, Shechter left the company in order to play drums in a rock group, The Human Beings, and study music in Paris. In 2002, he moved to London to perform with the Jasmin Vardimon Company, creating Fragments in 2003 on an interim with the company. Shechter also composed the music for the production.

Shechter was then commissioned by The Place Prize in 2004 to create Cult, winning the Audience Choice Award. Further works include Uprising in 2006, In Your Rooms, which he expanded in 2007 to work for the three venues The Place, the Southbank Centre and Sadler's Wells, and The Art of Not Looking Back in 2009, for an all-female cast. In 2008 he choreographed the dance sequence that opened the second series of Skins. He formed the Hofesh Shechter Dance Company in 2008. Shechter was nominated for the Tony Award for Best Choreography in 2016 for his work on Bartlett Sher's revival of Fiddler on the Roof. Since 2016, he has been named as one of The Stage's 100 most influential people in theatre.

== Major works ==
- Fragments (2003)
- Cult (2004)
- Uprising (2006)
- In your rooms (2007)
- The Art of Not Looking Back (2009)
- Political Mother (2010)
- Survivor (2012), commissioned by The Barbican, co-staged by Antony Gormley
- Sun (2013)
- Political Mother: The Choreographer's Cut (2014)
- Untouchable (2015), commissioned by The Royal Ballet
- Orphee et Eurydice (2015), Royal Opera House Production
- Barbarians (2015)
- Clowns (2016), for Nederlands Dans Theater
- Fiddler on the Roof (2016), Broadway revival
- Grand Finale (2017)
- Show (2018)
- Political Mother Unplugged (2020)
- Double Murder (2021)
- Contemporary Dance 2.0 (2022)
- From England with Love (2024)
- Theatre of Dreams (2024)

== Filmography ==
- Clowns (BBC - Produced by Illuminations Media)
- POLITICAL MOTHER: The Final Cut
- Return (Produced by Gauthier Dance and Theaterhaus Stuttgart)

== Personal life ==
Shechter has lived in the UK since 2002.

== Awards ==
In 2018, Shechter was awarded an honorary OBE in the Queen's Birthday Honours.

British Theatre Institute’s Award for Excellence in International Dance (2011)

Tony Nomination for his work on Fiddler on the Roof (2016)

Olivier Award Nominations for Best New Dance Production for Grand Finale (2018) and Theatre of Dreams (2025) with Best Theatre Choreographer for Oedipus (2025)

Best Dance Film, Cannes World Film Festival (2023)
