= Alliance Française French Film Festival =

Australian film festival with a focus on French cinema

L'Alliance Française French Film Festival is an annual French film festival in Australia organised by Alliance Française.

== The Alliance Française ==
Alliance Française Logo

The Alliance Française was founded in 1883 in Paris and is dedicated to promoting and encouraging a love of French language and culture around the world. The Paris Alliance was created in 1884 by a board of directors featuring names such as Jules Verne (writer) and Louis Pasteur (chemist and biologist). The first Alliance Française abroad was created the same year in Barcelona.

Today there are 1040 Alliance Françaises in 136 countries. Each Alliance Française is an independent, local, not-for-profit organisation.

The Alliance Française French Film Festival is jointly organised by the Alliance Françaises of Sydney, Melbourne, Brisbane, Canberra, Perth and Adelaide and is supported by the French Embassy.

== The Festival ==
The Alliance Française French Film Festival is the main French cultural event in Australia and is one of the most important film events in Sydney, Melbourne, Canberra, Perth, Adelaide and Brisbane. The festival continues to grow from strength to strength, encapsulating a growing international interest in French cinema. French cinema has an appeal that reaches far beyond France's local community. As one of Australia's only national film events, it has great appeal to national media and sponsors. It is the largest foreign film festival in Australia showcasing the best of contemporary French cinema including action, romance, comedy, thrillers, children's films, animation and documentaries.

Films are shown at Palace Cinemas Como, Balwyn, Brighton Bay, Westgarth and Kino in Melbourne; the Hayden Orpheum in Cremorne, Palace Chauvel, Verona and Norton Street in Sydney, Greater Union Cinema and NFSA in Canberra, Palace Barracks and Centro in Brisbane, Palace Nova in Adelaide and Cinema Paradiso, Luna on Essex and Windsor Cinema in Perth.

The Alliance Française French Film festival is used to welcome special guests : Catherine Deneuve in 2008, Gérard Jugnot in 2009, Jean-Pierre Jeunet for his movie Micmacs, Jan Kounen for Coco Chanel & Igor Stravinsky and Philippe Lioret for Welcome in 2010. in 2011, Clotilde Hesme came, starring in Angèle & Tony. For 2012, Rémi Bezançon came for presenting his movie "A Happy Event". In 2017, Inna Modja, Rebecca Zlotowski & Emmanuelle Bercot were guests and presented their films.

== See also ==
- Cinema of France
