= Noir in Festival =

Film festival in Italy

- Location: Milan, Italy
- Founded: 1991
- Festival date: December
- Website: http://www.noirfest.com

Noir in Festival is a film noir film festival, held each December in Milan, Italy. Until 2015, it was held in Courmayeur.
