= Kléber Haedens =

French novelist and journalist (1913–1976)

Kléber Haedens (11 December 1913 in Équeurdreville – 13 August 1976), was a French novelist and journalist. He was a monarchist and a member of the Action Française in the 1930s. During World War II he worked as a secretary for Charles Maurras. He was a friend of Antoine Blondin, Michel Déon and Roger Nimier, and closely linked to the Hussards movement in post-war France. He received the Prix Interallié in 1966 for L'été finit sous les tilleuls and the Grand Prix du roman de l'Académie française in 1974 for Adios.

== Bibliography ==
- L'École des parents, Paris, Corrêa, 1937. Prix Cazes
- Magnolia-Jules, Paris, R.A. Corrêa, 1938
- Gérard de Nerval, ou la sagesse romantique, Paris, Grasset, 1939
- Une Jeune Serpente, Paris, Gallimard, 1940
- Paradoxe sur le roman, Marseille, Sagittaire, 1941
- Le Duc de Reichstadt, pièce en trois actes, Les Cahiers de "Patrie". 1re année, 1941. N°3
- Poésie française : une anthologie, 1942, Paris, La Table Ronde.
- Une Histoire de la littérature française, Paris, Julliard, 1943.
- Franz, Paris-Marseille, Robert-Laffont, 1944
- Adieu à la rose, Paris, Gallimard, 1945
- Salut au Kentucky, Paris, Laffont, 1947.
- La France que j'aime, Paris, Sun, 1964
- L'été finit sous les tilleuls, Paris, Grasset, 1966. Prix Interallié
- Londres que j'aime, Paris, Sun, 1970
- Adios, Paris, Grasset, 1974. Grand Prix du roman de l'Académie française
- L'Air du Pays, preface by Geneviève Dormann, Albin Michel, 1963
- Lettres de la petite ferme, Paris, Grasset, 2000 (posthumous)
