= Éditions de la Table ronde =

French publishing company

Éditions de la Table ronde is a French publishing house founded in 1944 by Roland Laudenbach. Since 1996 it has been an imprint of éditions Gallimard.

== History ==
The company was founded by Roland Laudenbach in 1944 and named by Jean Cocteau. Its first published title was Antigone by Jean Anouilh. After World War II it came to publish several authors who had been blacklisted by the Conseil national des écrivains due to accusations of collaboration or pacifism, such as Henry de Montherlant, Jean Giono and Paul Morand. Its right-wing and anti-Gaullist reputation intensified during the Algerian War. It also published authors such as Claude Mauriac and Henri Troyat, and became associated with the movement les Hussards, and its leading members Antoine Blondin, Michel Déon, Jacques Laurent and Roger Nimier. Other published authors included Marcel Aymé, Henry Muller, Bernard Frank, Roger Stéphane, Jean Freustié, Daniel Boulanger and Alain Bosquet.

A second generation of Table ronde authors included Alphonse Boudard, Gabriel Matzneff, Frédéric Musso and Éric Neuhoff. Laudenbach retired in 1990 and was replaced by Denis Tillinac. He published authors such as Jean-Paul Kauffmann, Frédéric H. Fajardie, Yves Charnet, Jean-Claude Pirotte, Frédérick Tristan, Xavier Patier, William Cliff and Michel Monnereau. Tillinac was succeeded by Alice Déon in 2007. Éditions Gallimard acquired the company in 1958 and it has been an imprint of Gallimard since 1996.

== Literary prizes ==
Literary prizes won by La Table Ronde books have included:

- Prix Renaudot: 1944: Les amitiés particulières (Roger Peyrefitte); 1955: Le Moissonneur d'épines (Georges Govy); 1970: Isabelle ou l'arrière-saison (Jean Freustié); 1977: Les Combattants du petit bonheur (Alphonse Boudard); 2013: Séraphin c'est la fin! (Gabriel Matzneff)
- Grand Prix du roman de l'Académie française: 1955: Les Aristocrates (Michel de Saint-Pierre)
- Prix Interallié: 1959: Un singe en hiver (Antoine Blondin); 1960: Clem (Henry Muller)
- Prix du Livre Inter: 1975: Des demeures et des gens (Catherine d'Etchéa)

== Book series ==
- Adam
- Le beau Passé
- Les Chemins de la Sagesse
- Le Choix
- Cinéma-Textes
- Civilisations et Religions
- Les classiques du rugby
- Contretemps
- Le Damier
- Documents
- Domaine du sport
- Écrits français
- Essais
- Étrangère
- Grande Collection historique
- Grandeurs
- Les grandes forces historiques
- Les grands romans de l'écran
- L'Histoire contemporaine revue et corrigée
- Un inconnu nommé...
- La Mémoire
- Meneurs d'hommes
- Miroir de la Terre
- Mouvements d'idées
- La nonpareille
- Le nouveau Choix
- L'Ordre du jour
- La Palatine
- Petit Quai Voltaire
- La petite Vermillon
- Les Petits Livres de la Sagesse
- Place publique
- Profils
- Quai Voltaire
- Les quatre vérités
- Quelques pas en arrière
- La République des lettres
- Revue Cahiers de La Table Ronde
- Romans français (1944-1952)
- Les romans policiers de la Table Ronde
- Série drôle
- Sous le signe de la Croix
- La Table Ronde de «Combat» - Les Brûlots
- La Table Ronde de «Combat» - La politique selon...
- Techniques et histoire des arts
- La Terre est ronde
- Théâtre
- L'Usage des jours
- La Vendange
- Vérité-Justice
- Vermillion
- Les Vies perpendiculaires
