= Giraudeau =

Giraudeau is a surname. Notable people with the surname include:

- Bernard Giraudeau (1947–2010), French actor and director
- Jean Giraudeau (1916–1995), French opera singer
- Sara Giraudeau (born 1985), French actress
