= Julian Evans =

Julian Evans is the name of:

- Julian Evans (writer) (born 1955), Australian writer and presenter
- Julian Evans (adventurer) (born 1977), British adventurer and fund-raiser

== See also ==
- Juliana Evans (born 1989), Malaysian actress
