= Pol Vandromme =

Pol Vandromme (12 March 1927 – 28 May 2009) was a Belgian literary critic and writer.

== Life and career ==
Born in Gilly, near Charleroi, on 12 March 1927, Pol Vandromme emerged in the 1950s as a literary critic who valued style and narrative over ideas and what he called "Stalinist humanism", which made him a contrarian in a time when Jean-Paul Sartre was highly regarded and placed him in association with the Hussards literary movement. In addition to Hussards like Antoine Blondin, the contemporary writers Vandromme praised included Roger Vailland and Françoise Sagan. He wrote books about the writers Louis-Ferdinand Céline, Georges Simenon, Roger Nimier, Michel Déon, Felicien Marceau, Michel Mohrt and Jacques Perret, as well as the singers Jacques Brel and Georges Brassens, and the first in-depth book about The Adventures of Tintin, published in 1959. He wrote one novel, Un été acide, published in 1990.

The Académie Française awarded Vandomme its prix du rayonnement de la langue et de la littérature françaises in 1984 and its grand prix de la critique in 1992.

He died on 28 May 2009 in Loverval.
