= Gérard Lanvin =

French actor

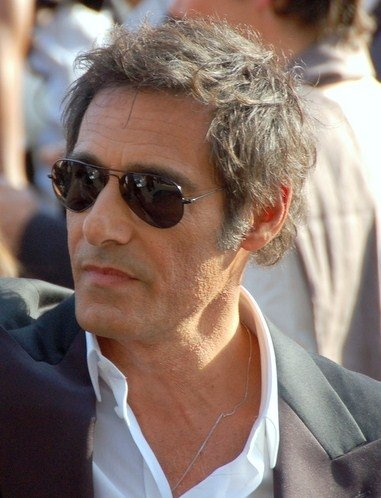
- Gérard Lanvin at the 2008 Cannes Film Festival
- Born: 21 June 1950 (age 76); Boulogne-Billancourt, Hauts-de-Seine, France
- Occupation: Actor
- Years active: 1971-present
- Spouse: Chantal Benoist

Gérard Lanvin (French pronunciation: [ʒeʁaʁ lɑ̃vɛ̃]; born 21 June 1950) is a French actor.

== Biography ==
Born to an upper-class family, Lanvin quit his studies when he was 17 to become an actor, against the wishes of his parents. For several years he made a living selling second-hand clothes. While selling jeans, he met Coluche and Miou-Miou and discovered through them the café-théâtre scene. He later become a regular performer at the Café de la Gare, where he also held various duties such as stagehand and lighting manager. In 1975, he created the theater La Veuve Pichard in Paris, together with other actors including Anémone and Martin Lamotte.

Coluche offered him his first major film role in the comedy Vous n'aurez pas l'Alsace et la Lorraine (1977). However, following the film's box-office failure, Lanvin struggled for a time to find roles. In 1980, he played a starring role in the drama A Week's Vacation. Lanvin next gained notice for his role in the psychological thriller Strange Affair (1981), which earned him the Jean-Gabin Award. Lanvin then starred in several crime and action films, including the dystopic science fiction thriller Le prix du danger (1983).

In 1984, Lanvin enjoyed particular success by co-starring with Michel Blanc in the comedy film Marche à l'ombre. This was followed the next year by another box-office hit, the action film Les Spécialistes, in which Lanvin co-starred with Bernard Giraudeau.

Several of Lanvin's subsequent films were commercial disappointments, notably the romantic comedy Moi vouloir toi (1986) which he had scripted as a vehicle for himself and his wife Jennifer. In 1994, he returned to success by starring in the drama The Favourite Son for which he won the César Award for Best Actor.

During the 2000s, Lanvin appeared in several popular comedies, winning the César Award for Best Actor in a Supporting Role with The Taste of Others (2000). Other box-office successes included the comedies 3 Zéros (2002), Camping (2006) and the gangster film Les Lyonnais (2011).

== Personal life ==
Lanvin has been married since 1984 to Chantal Benoist, who was active during the 1970s and 1980s as an actress, model and disco singer under the stage name Jennifer. They have two children.

== Selected filmography ==
Year	Title	Role	Director
1976	L'aile ou la cuisse	Circus guy	Claude Zidi
1977	Vous n'aurez pas l'Alsace et la Lorraine	The White Knight	Coluche
1979	Heroes Are Not Wet Behind the Ears	The Guard	Charles Nemes
1980	A Week's Vacation	Pierre	Bertrand Tavernier
1980	Extérieur, nuit	Léo	Jacques Bral
1981	Le Choix des armes	Inspecteur Sarlat	Alain Corneau
1981	Strange Affair	Louis Coline	Pierre Granier-Deferre
1982	Tir groupé	Antoine Béranger	Jean-Claude Missiaen
1983	Le Prix du Danger	François Jacquemard	Yves Boisset
1984	Ronde de nuit	Inspecteur Gu Arenas	Jean-Claude Missiaen
1984	Marche à l'ombre	François	Michel Blanc
1985	Les Spécialistes	Stéphane Carella	Patrice Leconte
1986	Moi vouloir toi	Patrick Montanet	Patrick Dewolf
1986	The Joint Brothers	Manu	Hervé Palud
1988	Saxo	Sam Friedman	Ariel Zeitoun
1989	My Best Pals	Patrick	Jean-Marie Poiré
1990	There Were Days... and Moons	the trucker	Claude Lelouch
1992	La Belle Histoire	the gypsy named Jesus	Claude Lelouch
1993	Les Marmotte	Max	Élie Chouraqui
1994	The Favourite Son	Jean-Paul Mantegna	Nicole Garcia
1995-1996	François Kléber (TV series, 6 episodes)	François Kléber	Patrick Jamain
1996	My Man	Jeannot	Bertrand Blier
2000	The Taste of Others	Franck Moreno	Agnès Jaoui
2001	Les Morsures de l'aube (Love bites)	Étienne	Antoine de Caunes
2002	Le Boulet	Gérard Moltès	Alain Berbérian and Frédéric Forestier
2002	Ice Age	Manny	French Dub, voice
2002	3 Zéros	Alain Colonna	Fabien Onteniente
2004	San-Antonio	San-Antonio	Frédéric Auburtin
2006	Camping	Michel Saint-Josse	Fabien Onteniente
2008	Mesrine (part 2 only)	Charlie Bauer	Jean-François Richet
2009	Bank Error in Your Favour	Julien Foucault	Gérard Bitton and Michel Munz
2010	Point Blank	Captain Patrick Werner	Fred Cavayé
2011	Les Lyonnais (A Gang Story)	Edmond Vidal, alias "Momon"	Olivier Marchal
2013	Angélique	Count Joffrey de Peyrac	Ariel Zeitoun
2014	Get Well Soon	Pierre Laurent	Jean Becker
2014	96 hours	Gabriel Carré	Frédéric Schoendoerffer
2014	Colt 45	Commandant Christian Chavez	Fabrice du Welz
2015	French Cuisine	Alex	Florent-Emilio Siri
2020	Papi Sitter	André Morales	Philippe Guillard
2020	Rogue City	Maranzano	Olivier Marchal
2021	Fly Me Away	Dr. Henri Reinhard	Christophe Barratier
2024	Quatre Zéros	Alain Colonna	Fabien Onteniente
2025	Last Bullet	Resz	Guillaume Pierret
2026	Redemptions (Rédemptions)		Luc Picard

== Discography ==
=== Albums ===
Year	Album	Charts		Certification
Year	Album	FRA	BEL (Wa)	Certification
2021	Ici-bas	10	35	

== Awards ==
- 1982: Jean-Gabin Award for Strange Affair
- 1995: The Favourite Son for The Favourite Son
- 2001: César Award for Best Actor in a Supporting Role for The Taste of Others

=== Nominations ===
- 1982: César Award for Best Actor in a Supporting Role for Strange Affair
- 1983: César Award for Best Actor for Tir groupé
