= A Monkey in Winter =

A Monkey in Winter may refer to:

- A Monkey in Winter (novel), a 1959 novel by Antoine Blondin
  - A Monkey in Winter (film), a 1962 French film directed by Henri Verneuil
