= Olivier Maulin =

French writer (born 1969)

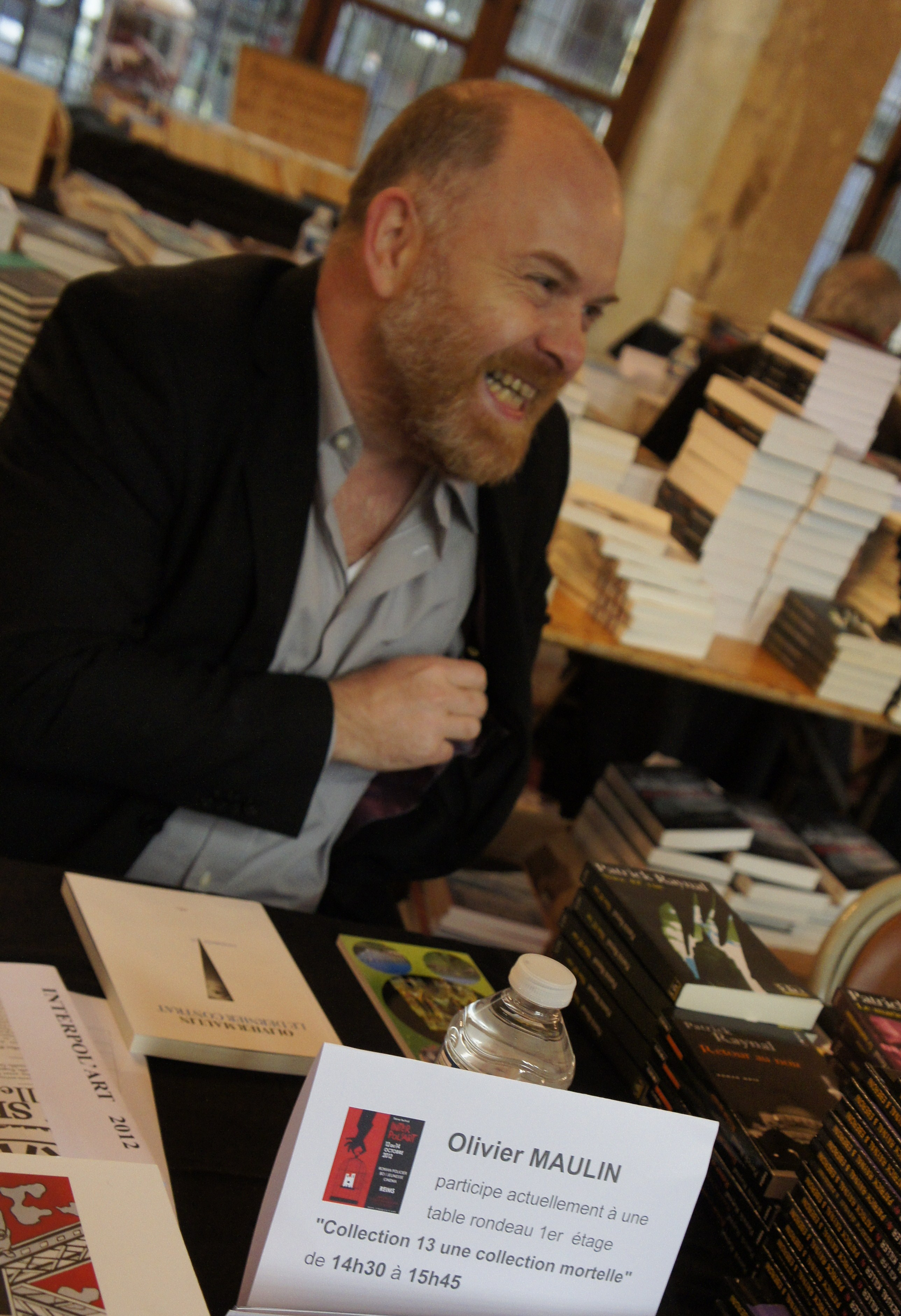
Maulin at the 2012 Interpol'Art festival

Olivier Maulin (born 1969 in Alsace) is a French writer. His works have been characterised by humour and satire. His 2006 novel En attendant le roi du monde received the Ouest-France Prize at the Étonnants voyageurs festival. The journalist Jérôme Leroy has described Maulin as an "anar de droite", a right-wing anarchist, and thereby grouped him with writers such as François Rabelais, Marcel Aymé, Antoine Blondin and the screenwriter Michel Audiard. Reviewing Maulin's novel Les Lumières du ciel for Le Figaro, Frédéric Beigbeder described Maulin as a "neo-hippie".

== Bibliography ==
- Dernier combat, Rencontres, 2001.
- Isabelle, 00h00, 2002.
- En attendant le roi du monde, L'Esprit des Péninsules, 2006.
- Les évangiles du lac, L'Esprit des Péninsules, 2008.
- Derrière l'horizon, L'Esprit des Péninsules, 2009.
- Petit monarque et catacombes, L'Esprit des Péninsules, 2009.
- Les Lumières du ciel, Balland, 2011.
- Le dernier contrat, éd. La Branche, 2012.
- Le bocage à la nage, Balland, 2013.
- Gueule de bois, Denoël, 2014.
