= Hussards (disambiguation) =

Hussards means hussars in French.

It may also refer to:

- Hussards (literary movement), a French literary movement in the 1950s
- Les Hussards, a French comedy film from 1955
