= The Medic (1979 film) =

- Directed by: Pierre Granier-Deferre
- Written by: Pierre Granier-Deferre; Jean Freustié
- Produced by: Alain Delon; Alain Terzian
- Starring: Alain Delon; Véronique Jannot
- Music by: Philippe Sarde
- Production company: Adel Productions
- Distributed by: Cinema International Corporation
- Release date: 27 October 1979
- Running time: 90 minutes
- Countries: France; West Germany
- Language: French
- Budget: $3 million
- Box office: 1,713,247 admissions (France)

The Medic (French: Le Toubib) is a 1979 French film directed by Pierre Granier-Deferre, adapted from the novel Harmonie ou les horreurs de la guerre by Jean Freustié.

== Plot ==
The film is set during World War Three (portrayed as taking place in 1983) as battles take place between Eastern and Western forces. Behind the battle lines, in a medical unit, a surgeon falls in love with an idealistic nurse after an initially difficult meeting.

== Cast ==
- Alain Delon as Jean-Marie Desprée
- Véronique Jannot as Harmony
- Bernard Giraudeau as François
- Francine Bergé as Marcia
- Michel Auclair as Le patron
- Catherine Lachens as Zoa
- Bernard Le Coq as Gérôme
