= Éric Névé =

French film producer (1961–2019)

Éric Névé (23 July 1961 – 21 July 2019), was a French film producer who produced from the early nineteen nineties until his death. In 1993, he founded his own production company, La Chauve Souris. Éric is best known for Jan Kounen’s Dobermann, starring Vincent Cassel and Monica Bellucci, Jean-Paul Salomé’s Female Agents starring Sophie Marceau, and Frédéric Schoendoerffer's Crime Insiders. In 2011, he founded Astou Films, a production company based in Senegal, with whom he produced the French-Senegalese film The Pirogue directed by Senegalese director Moussa Touré, screened in the section Un Certain Regard at the Cannes Film Festival 2012 and in over 80 film festivals across the globe. In 2013 he created, with Nicholas Eschbach an international feature film sales and co-production company, Indie Sales, which focuses on diverse international independent films with a strong commercial potential.

== Selected filmography ==
– 1997 Dobermann directed by Jan Kounen with Vincent Cassel, Monica Bellucci

– 2000 Scènes Crime directed by Frédéric Schoendoerffer with Charles Berling, André Dussolier

– 2004 Agents Secrets directed by Frédéric Schoendoerffer with Vincent Cassel, Monica Bellucci, André Dussolier

– 2006 Sheitan directed by Kim Chapiron with Vincent Cassel, Olivier Barthélémi, Roxane Mesquida

– 2007 Truands directed by Frédéric Schoendoerffer with Benoît Magimel, Philippe Caubère, Béatrice Dalle

– 2008 Les Femmes de l’Ombre directed by Jean-Paul Salomé with Sophie Marceau

– 2012 The Pirogue by Moussa Touré. with Souleymane Seye Ndiave, Laïti Fall
