= Vandromme =

Vandromme is a surname. Notable people with the surname include:

- Jeline Vandromme (born 2008), Belgian tennis player
- Pol Vandromme (1927–2009), Belgian literary critic
- Sharon Vandromme (born 1983), Belgian cyclist
