= The Foundling Boy =

1975 novel by Michel Déon

- First edition
- Author: Michel Déon
- Original title: Le Jeune homme vert
- Translator: Julian Evans
- Language: French
- Publisher: Éditions Gallimard
- Publication date: 1975
- Publication place: France
- English publication date: 2013
- Pages: 334

The Foundling Boy is a 1975 novel by the French writer Michel Déon. The original French title is Le jeune homme vert, which means "the green young man". It tells the story of a boy who is found at the doorstep of a childless couple in 1919, and follows the naive boy through his education and travels during the interwar period.

The book was published in English in 2013, translated by Julian Evans. It was followed by the sequel The Foundling's War in 1977. It was the basis for a French television series starring Philippe Deplanche, which ran in six episodes on Antenne 2 from 29 June 1979.

== Reception ==
Anthony Cummins wrote for The Spectator in 2014: "There's an infectious, near-magical sense that anything might happen in this novel. ... There’s a nod to Flaubert's Sentimental Education and more than a shade of Alain-Fournier's Le Grand Meaulnes as Jean grows up, mired in longing, uninterested in the political upheavals that Déon notes assiduously. ... [Déon's] novel leaves you feeling better about life, not worse, which might be part of why it hasn't previously been translated." The same year, Diane Johnson of The New York Times compared the novel to Tom Jones by Henry Fielding: "As with all such accounts, this one appeals to our inner orphan, the sense we have that we are alone and have a lot to learn. Also like Tom Jones, it's funny. ... If it seems strange for Déon, writing in the mid-70s, to resurrect Fielding, his impulse might have had something to do with the political situation at the time, still roiled by the aftermath of the civil unrest of 1968. As we read Tom Jones, we are more or less ignorant of or indifferent to the political climate of Tom's and Fielding's times — Jacobite rebellions in 18th-century England — but the world of France in 1975, like the world of the novel between the wars, was marked by the longstanding right-left divisions that had been apparent since the Dreyfus Affair of the 1890s."
