= The Pirogue =

2012 film

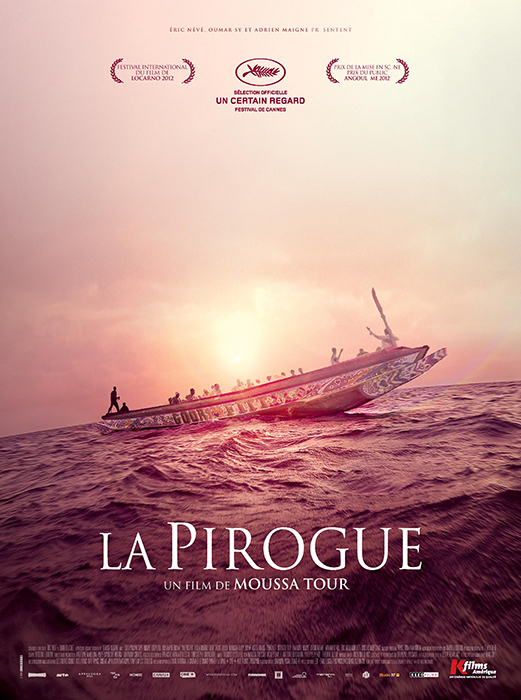
- Film poster
- Directed by: Moussa Touré
- Written by: Abasse Ndione
- Screenplay by: David Bouchet and Éric Névé
- Produced by: Angeline Massoni
- Starring: Souleymane Seye Ndiaye；Laïty Fall；Malaminé 'Yalenguen' Dramé；Balla Diarra
- Cinematography: Thomas Letellier
- Edited by: Josie Miljevic
- Music by: Prince Ibrahima Ndour
- Production companies: Les Chauves-Souris; Astou Films; Arte France Cinéma; Appaloosa Films; Royal Pony Film; LCS; Studio 37
- Distributed by: Rezo Films; Studio 37
- Release date: October 17, 2012
- Running time: 87 minutes
- Countries: France; Senegal; Germany
- Languages: French; Spanish; Wolof

The Pirogue (French: La Pirogue) is a 2012 drama film directed by Moussa Touré. The film follows a fisherman, Baya Leye, with a group of Senegalese immigrants sailing to Spain. The film competed in the Un Certain Regard section at the 2012 Cannes Film Festival.

== Plot ==
In Dakar, local fishermen's are struggling to support themselves and their families. The protagonist, Baye, convinces his friend, Lansana, to captain a pirogue on a dangerous journey to Spain. Lansana is initially hesitant, but the promise of a better life for his family convinces him to take on the challenge.

The group of fishermen who join the journey were a diverse mix of characters, each with their own reasons for leaving Senegal. Among them are a young man named Kaba, who dreams of becoming a football player in Europe, and a married couple, Moussa and Nafy, who hope to build a better life for their children.

The journey across the Atlantic was long and perilous, and the passengers are forced to endure hunger, thirst, and extreme weather conditions. The group is also plagued by uncertainty and doubt, as they wonder whether they will ever make it to Europe alive.

As the journey progresses, tensions rise among the fishermen. Some of them begin to lose hope, while others become increasingly desperate. After becoming ill, a fisherman named Samba must be thrown overboard to avoid infecting the others.

Despite the challenges they face, the passengers continue on their journey, driven by the hope of a better life. When they finally reach Spain, they are confronted with the harsh realities of Europe's immigration policies. They are detained and placed in a refugee camp, where they are forced to wait indefinitely for their fate to be decided.

== Cast ==
- Souleymane Seye Ndiaye as Baye Laye
- Malaminé 'Yalenguen' Dramé as Abou
- Mame Astou Diallo as Nafy
- Laïty Fall as Lansana
- Balla Diarra as Samba
- Saikou Lo as Yaya
- Salif 'Jean' Diallo as Barry
- Babacar Oualy as Kaba
- Ngalgou Diop as Aziz
- Limamou Ndiaye as Richard
- Diode Ndiaye as Kiné
- Mohamed Fall as Mor
- Bassirou Diakhate as Bourbi
- Moctar Diop as Ousmane
- Alioune Ndiaye as Bouba

== Production ==
The screenplay was written by Eric Névé. It was shot on location in Dakar, Senegal, and in the Atlantic Ocean off the coast of Mauritania. The cast includes several professional actors, as well as non-professional actors who were recruited from the local Senegalese communities. The film premiered at the Cannes Film Festival in May 2012 and was subsequently released in France and other countries. It was well-received by critics and audiences, and it won several awards at international film festivals.

== Awards ==
- Audience Award, Narrative Feature Film, Carthage Film Festival (2012)
- Tanit d'Or, Narrative Feature Film, Carthage Film Festival (2012)
- ARRI Award, Best International Film, Munich Film Festival (2012)
- Global Images Award, Global Images, Cyprus Film Days international Festival (2013)
- Lumiere Award, Best French-Language Film, Lumiere Awards, France (2013)
