= Horseman, Pass By! =

Book by Michel Déon

- 2007 Folio edition (publ. Gallimard) showing Dunguaire Castle in County Galway
- Author: Michel Déon
- Original title: Cavalier, passe ton chemin!
- Translator: Clíona Ní Ríordáin
- Language: French
- Publisher: Éditions Gallimard
- Publication date: 13 May 2005
- Publication place: France
- English publication date: 2016
- Pages: 204
- ISBN: 9782070774685

Horseman, Pass By! (French: Cavalier, passe ton chemin!) is a 2005 book by the French writer Michel Déon. It recounts Déon's memories and impressions from Ireland and Irish culture.

== Origin ==
Michel Déon visited Ireland for the first time in 1956, invited by his friend Christine de Rivoyre. He lived in Greece for several years and moved to Ireland in 1969. He settled with his family in the village of Tynagh, County Galway in a former rectory from the 18th century. The church was turned into a stable, with the approval of the village priest. Ireland has been the setting for several of Déon's most successful novels, notably Un taxi mauve, which was adapted into the 1977 film The Purple Taxi. According to Déon he has tried to include at least one Irish character in every novel he has written since he moved to the island.

The title Horseman, Pass By! is taken from the poem "Under Ben Bulben" by W. B. Yeats. The quotation is also found on Yeats' tombstone.

== Publication ==
The book was published on 13 May 2005 through éditions Gallimard. An English translation by Clíona Ní Ríordáin was published in 2016 through The Lilliput Press. According to Déon's wife, the writer got to see the edition when he emerged briefly from a coma before Christmas, before he died on 28 December 2016.

== Reception ==
Xavier Houssin wrote in Le Monde: "Of these authors of Erin, assembling the words thrown at the brim of storms, Horseman, Pass By! is above all a great deal about William Butler Yeats. ... Déon makes the poet, his life, his works, the absolute epicentre of an intimate wandering. Compass point in place, he traces the circle and rosettes of a long walk around him. ... You are touched. Conquered."
