= Where Are You Dying Tonight? =

1981 novel by Michel Déon

- 1981 L'Imaginaire edition
- Author: Michel Déon
- Original title: Un déjeuner de soleil
- Translator: Julian Evans
- Language: French
- Publisher: Éditions Gallimard
- Publication date: 1981
- Publication place: France
- English publication date: 1983
- Pages: 333
- ISBN: 9782235012508

Where Are You Dying Tonight? is a 1981 novel by the French writer Michel Déon. Its French title is Un déjeuner de soleil, which literally means "a sun's breakfast" and is an expression for something short-lived. It tells the story of Stanislas Beren, a fictional 20th-century novelist, with excerpts from his novels and the events from his life that inspired them. An English translation by Julian Evans was published in 1983.

== Reception ==
G. S. Bourdain of The New York Times called the book "highly literate" and wrote: "The story, which begins in 1925 and ends in 1977, is a delicious merging of narrative passages with excerpts from Stanislas' writings (footnotes included) and flashbacks to the events of his life that inspired those writings, not to mention numerous references to actual books, poems, paintings and people... The novel's citations of authors from Rimbaud to Maugham, descriptive phrases about paintings by artists from Giorgione to Picasso and mentions of real people from the period in which the book takes place are not only fun but also make one want to follow the Berens' trail through London and Paris to the art museums and trattorias of Venice. And the felicitous translation by Julian Evans never stumbles." Evans, the translator, wrote about the English-language edition: "The reviews it garnered were excellent; the sales made me want to weep."
