= L'Humeur vagabonde =

1955 novel by Antoine Blondin

- Author: Antoine Blondin
- Language: French
- Publisher: Éditions de la Table ronde
- Publication date: 1 May 1955
- Publication place: France
- Pages: 248

L'Humeur vagabonde (French pronunciation: [lymœʁ vaɡabɔ̃d]) is a 1955 novel by the French writer Antoine Blondin. It tells the story of a man who leaves his wife and children to make it in Paris, but returns home only to be mistaken as his wife's lover. The book was Blondin's third novel.

== Adaptation ==
The novel was adapted into a 1972 film with the same title. The film was directed by Édouard Luntz and stars Jeanne Moreau, Michel Bouquet, Madeleine Renaud and Eric Penet.
