= The Purple Taxi =

- Theatrical release poster
- French: Un taxi mauve
- Directed by: Yves Boisset
- Based on: Un taxi mauve by Michel Déon
- Produced by: Catherine Winter
- Starring: Charlotte Rampling; Peter Ustinov; Fred Astaire; Edward Albert
- Cinematography: Tonino Delli Colli
- Edited by: Albert Jurgenson
- Music by: Philippe Sarde
- Distributed by: ParaFrance Films
- Release date: 21 May 1977
- Running time: 120 minutes
- Countries: France; Italy; Ireland
- Language: French

The Purple Taxi (French: Un taxi mauve, lit. 'A mauve taxi') is a 1977 French-Irish-Italian film directed by Yves Boisset, based on the 1973 novel of the same name by Michel Déon. It was entered into the 1977 Cannes Film Festival.

== Plot ==
The film is about a group of emotionally troubled expatriates living in a self-imposed exile in a small village (Eyeries) on the Beara Peninsula in Ireland.

== Cast ==
- Charlotte Rampling - Sharon Frederick
- Peter Ustinov - Taubelman
- Fred Astaire - Dr. Seamus Scully
- Edward Albert - Jerry
- Philippe Noiret - Philippe Marcal
- Agostina Belli - Anne Taubelman
- Jack Watson - Sean
- Mairin D. O'Sullivan - Colleen
- David Kelly - Little Person
- Niall Buggy - Little Person
- May Cluskey - (as May Clusky)
- Loan Do Huu - Madame Li
- Brendon Doyle
- Michael Duffy
- Derek Lord

== Production ==
Filmed on location between October 1976 and January 1977 in Lismore, County Waterford, Kenmare, County Kerry and at Cork Airport. Filming also took place at Ardmore Studios.

== Film score ==
The film's score was performed by The Chieftains.
