= May Cluskey =

Irish actor

- Born: Mary Elizabeth Cluskey; 18 May 1927; Dublin, Ireland
- Died: 15 May 1991 (aged 63); Dublin
- Occupation: actress
- Years active: 1960s to 1980s
- Relatives: Frank Cluskey (brother)

Mary "May" Cluskey (18 May 1927 – 15 May 1991) was an Irish stage, film and television actress.

== Early life ==
Mary Elizabeth Cluskey was born in Dublin, Ireland, the daughter of Francis Cluskey and Elizabeth Millington Cluskey. Her brother Frank Cluskey was a politician, leader of the Labour Party from 1977 to 1981.

== Career ==
Cluskey was a member of the Abbey Theatre in Dublin from 1972 to 1986. Writer Thomas Kilroy remembered her as "an extraordinary comic actress". Among her roles at the Abbey were roles in The Silver Tassie (1972, 1973), The Stars Turn Red (1978) and Red Roses for Me (1980) by Seán O'Casey, Hatchet (1972) and Red Biddy (1978) by Heno Magee, Pull Down a Horseman (1972) by Eugene McCabe, They Feed Christians To Lions Here, Don't They? (1972) by Francis Harvey, The Gathering (1974) and A Pagan Place (1977) by Edna O'Brien, Katie Roche (1975) by Teresa Deevy, Faustus Kelly (1978), At Swim-Two-Birds (1981) and The Hard Life (1986) by Flann O'Brien, The Hostage (1981) by Brendan Behan, and in works by Oscar Wilde, Richard B. Sheridan, Oliver Goldsmith, Dion Boucicault, Henrik Ibsen, Arthur Miller, Anton Chekhov, W. B. Yeats, George S. Kaufman, John Millington Synge, and Bertolt Brecht.

Although Cluskey usually played supporting roles, often mothers, she played the title character in James Ballantyne's Sarah (1974). In 1976, she performed her one-woman show at the Gorey Arts Festival. In 1982, she toured in Frank McGuinness's The Factory Girls. She also wrote two plays, Mothers (1976, with Tomás Mac Anna; a one-woman show in which she also starred), and Or By Appointment (1986).

Cluskey was also known for the roles she played in films, including Young Cassidy (1965), Ulysses (1967), and The Purple Taxi (1977). On television she played Queenie Butler in the Irish soap opera Tolka Row, for which she won a Jacob's Award in 1966.

== Personal life ==
Cluskey died in Dublin in 1991, days before her 64th birthday.

== Filmography ==
Year	Title	Role	Notes
1964	Of Human Bondage	Sister	Uncredited
1965	Young Cassidy	Woman in Foyer	
1967	Ulysses	Mrs. Yelverton Barry	
1967	The Plough and the Stars	Mrs. Ginnie Gogan	
1970	Ryan's Daughter	Storekeeper	Uncredited
1977	The Purple Taxi		
1978	On a Paving Stone Mounted		last film role
