= Henry Muller (writer) =

French writer, journalist and book publisher

Henry Muller (21 August 1902, Muhlbach-sur-Bruche (Bas-Rhin) – 15 November 1980, Paris) was a French writer, journalist and book publisher. He began to work for the publishing house Grasset in 1923 and ended his publishing career as Grasset's secretary-general. He recounted his memories from Grasset and interwar France in the books Trois pas en arrière and Six pas en arrière. He received the 1960 Prix Interallié for the novel Clem.

== Bibliography ==
- Les Deux Doigts de la mort, les Publications techniques et artistiques, 1945
- La mort est toujours à l'heure, les Publications techniques et artistiques, 1945
- Trois pas en arrière, éditions de la Table ronde, 1952
- Six pas en arrière, La Table ronde, 1954
- Nuit et jour à Paris, photographs by Yurek, J. Delmas and Cie, 1957
- Le Général Boulanger, dictateur ou roi de cœur, éditions Gallimard, 1959
- Clem, novel, la Table ronde, 1960
- L'Alsace..., with photographs by Pierre Tetrel, Jacques Fronval, Robert Laeuffer, Yan..., Éditions Sun, 1962
- L'espérance a raison, novel, La Table ronde, 1963
- L'an 2000, une révolution sans perdants, novel, éditions Plon, 1965
- Sans tambour ni trompette - Malraux, Mauriac, Daninos, Maurois..., éditions La Palatine, 1968
- Le Figurant, éditions Grasset, 1976
- Retours de mémoire, éditions Grasset, 1979
- Mes sans jour, la Table ronde
