= William Cliff =

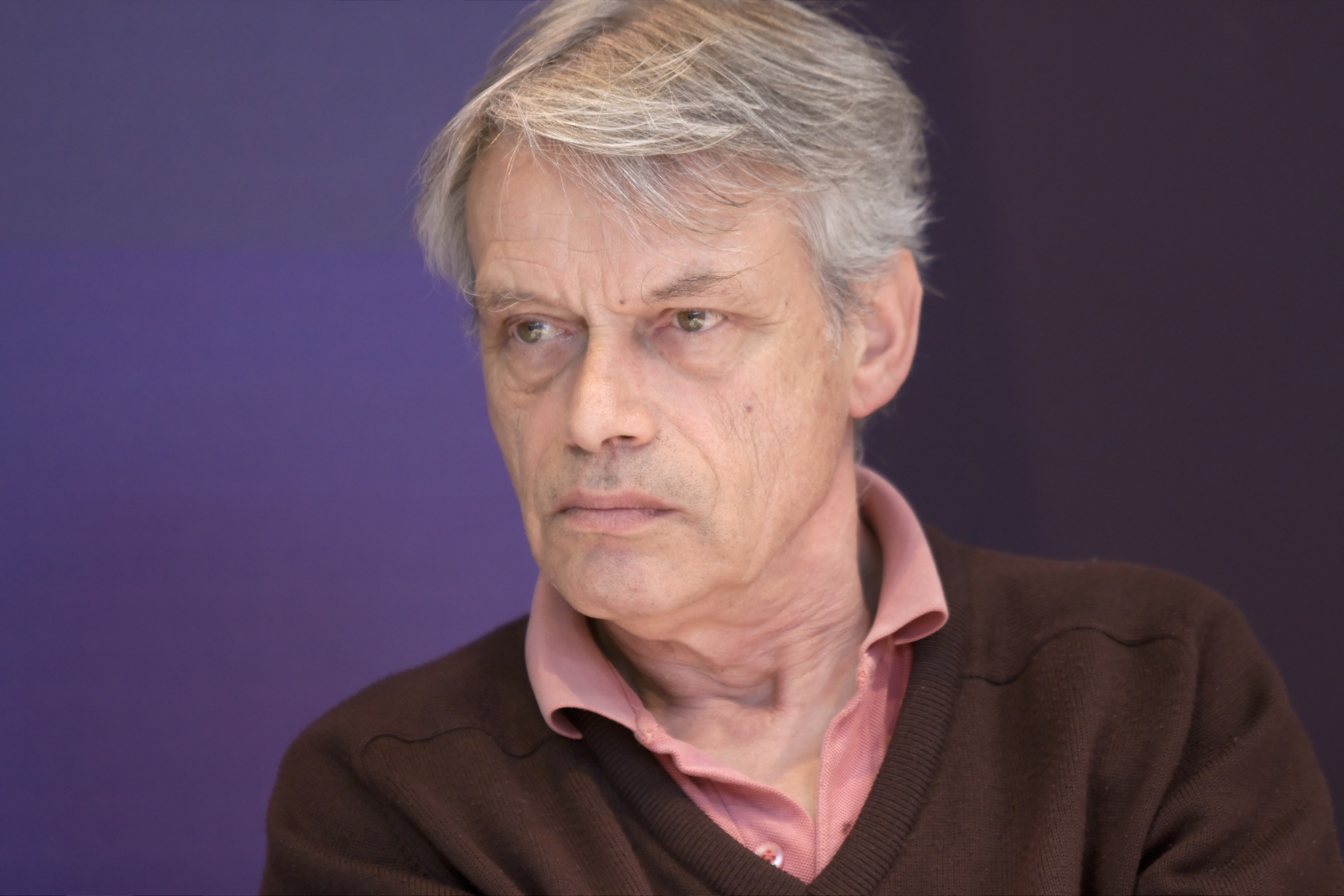
- William Cliff in March 2010
- Born: Andre Imberechts; 27 December 1940 (age 85); Gembloux, Belgium
- Occupation: poet

William Cliff (born André Imberechts, 27 December 1940) is a Francophone Belgian poet. He was born in Gembloux. His poems had the good fortune to be noticed early on by Raymond Queneau, and were published continuously by Gallimard until 1986. Cliff won the Prix Goncourt de la Poésie in 2014.

== Works ==
- Homo sum, Gallimard, in Cahier de poésie 1, 1973
- Écrasez-le, Gallimard, 1976
- réédition Écrasez-le, précédé de Homo sum, Gallimard, 2002, ISBN 2-07-076761-2
- Marcher au charbon, Gallimard, 1978
- America, Gallimard, 1983
- En Orient, Gallimard, 1986
- Conrad Detrez, Le Dilettante, Paris, 1990
- Fête Nationale, Gallimard, 1992
- Autobiographie, La Différence, 1993
- Journal d'un Innocent, Gallimard, 1996
- L'État belge, poèmes, La Table Ronde, 2001
- La Sainte Famille, (roman) La Table Ronde, 2001
- Adieu patries, Le Rocher, coll. Anatolia, Monaco, 2001
- Le Passager, (roman) Le Rocher, coll. Anatolia, Monaco, 2003
- Passavant la Rochère, Virgile, 2004
- La Dodge, (roman autobiographique) Le Rocher, coll. Anatolia, Monaco, 2004
- L'Adolescent, (roman) Le Rocher, coll. Anatolia, Monaco, 2005, ISBN 2-268-05658-9
- Le Pain quotidien, La Table Ronde, 2006, ISBN 2-7103-2842-9
- Immense Existence, Gallimard, 2007, ISBN 2-07-078417-7
- Épopées, La Table Ronde, 2008, ISBN 2-7103-3059-8

Translations

- Jaime Gil de Biedma, Un corps est le meilleur ami de l'homme, Le Rocher, coll. Anatolia
- Gabriel Ferrater, Les Femmes et les Jours, Le Rocher, coll. Anatolia, Monaco, 2004, ISBN 2-268-04977-9
- Dante, L'Enfer, Éditions du Hazard, 2013, La Table Ronde, 2014
- Dante, Le Purgatoire, Éditions du Hazard, 2019, La Table Ronde, 2021

== Awards and honors ==
- 1993 Prix Maurice Carême
- 2001 Prix Marcel Thiry for L'Etat belge
- 2004 Prix triennal de poésie for Adieu patries
- 2007 Grand prix de poésie de l'Académie française for oeuvre of poetry.
- 2007 Prix Roger-Kowalski
- 2010 Prix Quinquennal de littérature for oeuvre
- 2014 Prix Goncourt de la Poésie
