= Niall Buggy =

Irish actor

- Born: October 3, 1948 (age 76); Dublin, Ireland
- Education: Abbey Theatre School
- Occupation: Actor
- Years active: 1971–present
- Relatives: Eileen Buggy (sister)

Niall Buggy (born 3 October 1948) is an Irish actor. Buggy played Brian in Dead Funny for which he won an Olivier Award.

== Biography ==
=== Early life ===
Buggy was born on 3 October 1948 in Dublin. His parents attended the Theatre Royal every Friday night. At the age of 11, he ran away from home and travelled to the theatre, saying he was there for an audition. There were no auditions that day and he was told to return the following day. Buggy went home, intending to return the following day, but instead found a search party outside around his Drumcondra home.

Buggy enrolled at Dublin's Abbey Theatre School at 16.

=== Theatre ===
In 1995, Buggy won the Laurence Olivier Award for Best Comedy Performance for Dead Funny. In 2010, he starred alongside Brenda Blethyn in Edna O'Brien's play Haunted. The 6-date spring tour concluded with a run on the West End.

== Filmography ==
=== Film ===
Year	Title	Role	Notes
1971	Here Are Ladies		Film debut
1974	Zardoz	Arthur Frayn / Zardoz	
1976	Circasia	Clown	Short
1977	Un taxi mauve	Little person	English title: A Purple Taxi
1977	A Portrait of the Artist as a Young Man	Davin	
1977	Philadelphia, Here I Come!	Ned	
1978	Farmers		Television film
1985	King David	Nathan	
1987	Hellraiser	Dinner Guest	
1987	The Lonely Passion of Judith Hearne	Mr. Lenehan	
1988	Six Minutes with Ludwig	Ludwig van Beethoven	Short
1988	Once in a Life Time	George Lewis	Television film
1991	The Pope Must Diet	BBC Reporter	
1991	Close My Eyes	Geof	
1992	The Playboys	Denzil	
1992	Alien 3	Eric Buggy	
1992	The Hummingbird Tree	Priest	
1997	Anna Karenina	Doctor	
1997	The Butcher Boy	Father Dom	
1997	The Tale of Sweeney Todd	Vicar	Television film
2000	That Time	Listener	
2002	Cruise of the Gods	Graham	Television film
2002	The Reckoning	Priest	
2004	The Libertine	Chaplain	
2005	Malice Aforethought	Rev. Hessary Torr	Television film
2005	Casanova	Bookseller/ Printer	
2006	Vicious Circle	Seamus	Short
2006	What If	The Black Knight	Television film
2008	Mamma Mia! The Movie	Father Alex	
2008	Brideshead Revisited	Father Mackay	
2009	Dental Breakdown	The Professor	
2010	The Duel	Samoylenko	
2012	Rufus Stone	Flip	Short
2014	Mr Turner	John Carew	
2019	A Girl from Mogadishu	Michael D. Higgins	
2021	As Luck Would Have It	Alroy	Television film
2023	The Miracle Club	Tommy Fox	

=== Television ===
Year	Title	Role	Notes
1971	Me Mammy	Willie Canaan	Television debut
1971	The Sinners	Chris, Dwyer	
1974	2nd House	Actor in The Blood Knot	
1975	Thursday Play Date	O'Toole	
1980	The Professionals	Gorky	
1981	Nanny	Jack Perse	
1983	The Citadel	Con Boland	
1983	The Gathering Speed	Father Healy	
1984	Crown Court	Dr. Ronald Monk	
1986	Galloping Galaxies!	Space Pirate Chief Murphy	
1988	Bad Boyes	Dr. Watson	
1989	Screenplay	Kenny	
1989	Ruth Rendell Mysteries	Victor Vivian	
1991	Chancer	Randall	
1994	Little Napoleons	Angus Laker	Television mini series
1994–95	99-1	Elbow	
1995	The Bill	Des Riley	
1995	Father Ted	Henry Sellers	"Competition Time"
1995	Agony Again	Richard	
1996–98	Upwardly Mobile	Anthony Moriarty	
1999	Kavanagh QC	Francis Durden	
1999–00	Lucy Sullivan Is Getting Married	Mr. Sullivan	
2001	Monarch of the Glen	Kieran Conway	
2002	Family Affairs	Dougie Kendall	
2004	Grease Monkeys	Father Brennan	
2005	The Afternoon Play	Father Gartside	
2006	Dalziel and Pascoe	Drummond Sachs	2 episodes: "Fallen Angel"
2008	Lewis	R.G. Cole	
2010	Jack Taylor	Professor Gorman	
2016	My Mother and Other Strangers	Clarrie Marsden	Television mini series
2017	Will	Dr. John Dee	
2018	Extreme Physics	Isaac Neutron	Voice, Television mini series
2021	COBRA	Lord Allan Singer	

=== Podcast ===
Year	Title	Role
2017	The Trials of Saint Patrick	King Laoghaire
