= The Great and the Good =

1996 novel by Michel Déon

- Author: Michel Déon
- Original title: La Cour des grands
- Translator: Julian Evans
- Language: French
- Publisher: Éditions Gallimard
- Publication date: 5 September 1996
- Publication place: France
- English publication date: 10 January 2017
- Pages: 352
- ISBN: 9782070746064

The Great and the Good (French: La Cour des grands) is a 1996 novel by the French writer Michel Déon. It tells the story of a Frenchman who is born to a poor widow, moves to the United States in the 1950s and becomes a wealthy stockbroker, before he returns to France.

The book received the Grand prix Jean Giono.

== Publication ==
The novel was published by éditions Gallimard on 5 September 1996. Upon the publication it was given a segment on France 3's literature program Un livre, un jour. An English translation by Julian Evans is set to be published on 10 January 2017 through Gallic Books.
