= Your Father's Room =

2004 novel by Michel Déon

- 2005 Folio edition
- Author: Michel Déon
- Original title: La chambre de ton père
- Language: French
- Publisher: Éditions Gallimard
- Publication date: 5 February 2004
- Publication place: France
- English publication date: 1 June 2017
- Pages: 144

Your Father's Room (French: La chambre de ton père, pronounced [la ʃɑ̃bʁ də tɔ̃ pɛʁ]) is a 2004 novel by the French writer Michel Déon. It is set in Paris and Monaco in the 1920s and follows a young boy, Édouard, called Teddy. The book is a fictionalised autobiography based on Déon's childhood.

== Publication ==
The book was published in France on 5 February 2004 through éditions Gallimard. An English translation is set to be published through Gallic Books on 1 June 2017 in the United Kingdom and 13 June 2017 in the United States.

== Reception ==
Yasmina Reza of Le Figaro called the book "one of the most beautiful stories about grief that you can read".
