= Un souvenir =

1990 novel by Michel Déon

- 1991 edition
- Author: Michel Déon
- Language: French
- Publisher: Éditions Gallimard
- Publication date: 11 April 1990
- Publication place: France
- Pages: 156
- ISBN: 9782070719341

Un souvenir ("a memory") is a 1990 novel by the French writer Michel Déon. It tells the story of a French writer who travels to Westcliff-on-Sea in England, where he revisits the locations of his first love which he experienced before World War II.

== Adaptation ==
The book was the basis for a film with the same title directed by Jacques Renard and starring Daniel Prévost and Capucine Delaby. The film was made for France 2 and premiered on 8 July 2009.
