= The Speech (film) =

2020 comedy film

- Theatrical release poster
- Directed by: Laurent Tirard
- Screenplay by: Laurent Tirard
- Based on: Le Discours by Fabrice Caro
- Produced by: Olivia Lagache
- Starring: Benjamin Lavernhe; Sara Giraudeau; Kyan Khojandi; Julia Piaton; François Morel; Guilaine Londez
- Cinematography: Emmanuel Soyer
- Edited by: Valérie Deseine
- Music by: Mathieu Lamboley
- Production companies: Les Films sur Mesure; Le Pacte; France 2 Cinéma; Scope Pictures
- Distributed by: Le Pacte
- Release dates: 1 September 2020 (FFA); 9 June 2021 (France); 23 June 2021 (Belgium)
- Running time: 87 minutes
- Countries: France; Belgium
- Language: French
- Box office: $3 million

The Speech (French: Le Discours) is a 2020 comedy film written and directed by Laurent Tirard, based on the 2018 novel Le Discours by Fabrice Caro. It stars Benjamin Lavernhe and Sara Giraudeau. The film was selected for the 2020 Cannes Film Festival. It screened at the Angoulême Francophone Film Festival on 1 September 2020. It was released in France on 9 June 2021.

== Cast ==
- Benjamin Lavernhe as Adrien
- Sara Giraudeau as Sonia
- Kyan Khojandi as Ludo
- Julia Piaton as Sophie
- François Morel as Adrien's father
- Guilaine Londez as Adrien's mother
- Sébastien Chassagne as Sébastien
- Christophe Montenez as Solène's boyfriend
- Adeline D'Hermy as Solène
- Sarah Suco as Karine
- Laurent Bateau as The doctor
- Jean-Michel Lahmi as tech professor
- Marilou Aussilloux as Isabelle
- Sébastien Pouderoux as Romain

== Production ==
The Speech was produced by Olivia Lagache for Les Films sur Mesure, and co-produced by Le Pacte, France 2 Cinéma, and the Belgian company Scope Pictures.

Principal photography began on 21 October 2019, and lasted six weeks, wrapping on 2 December in Paris.

== Release ==
The Speech was included in the Comedy Films section of the official selection of the 2020 Cannes Film Festival, which was cancelled due to the global COVID-19 pandemic. It was screened for press and industry in an online edition of the Cannes Marché du Film in June 2020. The film was subsequently selected to be screened at the 13th Angoulême Francophone Film Festival, where it had its world premiere on 1 September 2023.

The film was initially scheduled to be released in theaters in France on 23 December 2020, which was rescheduled to March 2021 as a result of the COVID-19 pandemic. As cinemas in France remained subject to outright closures, the film was further postponed to an indefinite date. The Speech was finally released in France on 9 June 2021 by Le Pacte. The film was distributed in Belgium on 23 June by Cinéart.

== Critical reception ==
The Speech received an average rating of 3.3 out of 5 stars on the French website AlloCiné, based on 30 reviews.

Cineuropa's Vittoria Scarpa gave the film a positive review, noting its "subtle sense of melancholy which lends depth to the story and resonates with the viewer". La Nación's Milagros Amondaray gave the film a similarly positive review, concluding that "[w]hen it isn't cheesy or forced, The Speech is a welcome celebration of mistakes." Clarín's Nazareno Brega gave the film a negative review, finding the main character unlikeable and annoying.
