= L'Europe buissonnière =

1949 novel by Antoine Blondin

- Author: Antoine Blondin
- Language: French
- Publisher: Éditions Jean Froissart
- Publication date: 1949
- Publication place: France
- Pages: 391

L'Europe buissonnière (French pronunciation: [løʁɔp bɥisɔnjɛʁ]) is a 1949 novel by the French writer Antoine Blondin. It is based on Blondin's experiences as an STO worker at a rubber plant in Austria in 1943 and 1944. It depicts Europe during World War II in a comical fashion reminiscent of Louis-Ferdinand Céline's Journey to the End of the Night.

It was Blondin's debut novel and received the Prix des Deux Magots.
