= Je vous écris d'Italie =

1984 novel by Michel Déon

- 1984 edition
- Author: Michel Déon
- Language: French
- Publisher: Éditions Gallimard
- Publication date: 2 February 1984
- Publication place: France
- Pages: 324
- ISBN: 9782070701100

Je vous écris d'Italie ("I write to you from Italy") is a 1984 novel by the French writer Michel Déon. It is set in Italy in the summer of 1949 and follows a young French historian who tries to solve a mystery connected to a secret pagan festival. The novel received the Prix Maison de la Presse.

== Plot ==
Jacques Sauvage is a young French historian and Stendhal enthusiast. He fought for the French army during World War II and briefly visited the small town Varela in Umbria, Italy, in 1945. He returns to the area four years later in hope of being able to solve a mystery connected to the historically rich surroundings. The key to the mystery is a pagan festival which the locals are preparing in secret.
