= Les Poneys sauvages =

1970 novel by Michel Déon

- 1970 p/b edition
- Author: Michel Déon
- Language: French
- Publisher: Éditions Gallimard
- Publication date: 9 December 1970
- Publication place: France
- Pages: 504

Les Poneys sauvages ("the wild ponies") is a 1970 novel by the French writer Michel Déon. It tells the story of five friends who studied together at an English university, and how their friendship and loyalty keep them together during World War II and the Cold War, as they spread over Europe and to varying degrees engage in poetry, espionage, travels and unpredictable behaviour. The narration alternates between a first-person perspective and that of an epistolary novel.

The novel received the Prix Interallié. It was adapted into a 1983 television series with the same title, directed by Robert Mazoyer, which ran in five episodes, starring Jacques Weber.
