= A Monkey in Winter (film) =

- Directed by: Henri Verneuil
- Written by: François Boyer; Michel Audiard
- Based on: novel A Monkey in Winter by Antoine Blondin
- Produced by: Jacques Bar
- Starring: Jean Gabin; Jean-Paul Belmondo; Suzanne Flon
- Cinematography: Louis Page
- Edited by: Monique and Françoise Bonnot
- Music by: Michel Magne
- Distributed by: UFA-Comacico
- Release date: 11 May 1962 (France)
- Running time: 105 minutes
- Country: France
- Language: French
- Box office: 2,417,209 admissions (France)

A Monkey in Winter (French: Un singe en hiver) is a 1962 French comedy-drama film directed by Henri Verneuil. It is based on the novel A Monkey in Winter by Antoine Blondin. Set in a Normandy seaside town, it recounts the meeting and parting of two men at odds with life, one an old hotel keeper who dreams of dashing deeds in pre-war China and the other a young advertising executive who imagines he is an incarnation of Hispanic masculinity.

== Plot ==
With his dutiful but unimaginative wife Suzanne, Albert Quentin runs a small hotel in a little town on the coast of Normandy. After an exciting career as a marine in the French Navy, during which he served in China, he is bored and takes to drink. In June 1944 he is on a binge with his neighbour Esnault, who runs a bar, when the Allies launch a huge air raid. Finding his way back to his cellar, he comforts his terrified wife there and promises her that if their hotel stays intact he will give up drink. After fifteen years of sobriety, and more bored than ever, on a quiet winter night a nervous young man books in to the hotel. This is Gabriel Fouquet, who goes over to Esnault's bar and after ringing his wife who has left him and gone to Madrid, gets thoroughly drunk. Albert, who gets up to bring him in from the street and put him to bed, warms to the lonely stranger. Each has a dream world into which he retreats from reality: Albert relives and embellishes his exotic adventures in China, while Gabriel sees himself as an epitome of Spanish machismo, dancing flamenco and fighting bulls.

In the morning, Gabriel buys a sweater for a ten-year-old girl from an eccentric shopkeeper called Landru and visits the convent where his daughter Marie is a boarder. Too on edge to see her, he runs away when she is called. Albert and Suzanne in their different ways try to be kind to him, but he will keep drinking and causing upsets. One fateful night Albert succumbs and the two get roaring drunk. They visit a brothel Albert has not entered for fifteen years, though only to drink, start a fight in Esnault's bar, and cajole the shopkeeper Landru into setting off his stock of fireworks on the beach. When they force their way into the convent to abduct Marie, they are confronted by the head nun in a wheelchair, who repels them and says Marie will be released at ten in the morning. Gabriel collects his daughter then and the two are joined on the Paris train by a chastened Albert, who has once more renounced alcohol and is going to visit his father's grave inland. Albert tells Marie how in China lost monkeys creep into the towns during winter and, once there are enough of them, the people organise a train to take them all back to their native forests. He gets out at Lisieux, to face his own long winter.

== Cast ==
- Jean Gabin as Albert Quentin
- Suzanne Flon as Suzanne Quentin, Albert's wife
- Jean-Paul Belmondo as Gabriel Fouquet
- Sylviane Margollé as Marie Fouquet, Gabriel's daughter
- Noël Roquevert as Monsieur Landru, the shopkeeper
- Paul Frankeur as Monsieur Esnault, the café keeper
- Gabrielle Dorziat as Madame Victoria, the school head
- Geneviève Fontanel as Marie-Jo, the Fouquets' waitress
- Anne-Marie Coffinet as Simone, the Esnaults' waitress
- Hella Petri as Georgina, owner of the bar-brothel

== Reception ==
Bosley Crowther of The New York Times wrote that while "nothing great or profound is offered in this whimsey", "this moodily masculine story has a strong strain of wistfulness that laces its robust humor and gives it more than merely comic quality." He applauded the performances of all the main actors.

== Anniversary ==
Un singe en hiver was shot in Villerville. Villerville celebrated the film's 50th anniversary with many events from 30 June to 20 October 2012.
