= The Favourite Son =

- Film poster
- Directed by: Nicole Garcia
- Written by: Nicole Garcia; François Dupeyron; Jacques Fieschi
- Produced by: Philippe Carcassonne; Alain Sarde
- Starring: Gérard Lanvin; Jean-Marc Barr; Bernard Giraudeau
- Cinematography: Eric Gautier
- Edited by: Yann Dedet; Agnès Guillemot
- Music by: Philippe Sarde
- Production companies: Cinéa; Les Films Alain Sarde; France 3 Cinéma; Angel's Company
- Distributed by: AMLF
- Release date: 21 December 1994
- Running time: 110 minutes
- Country: France
- Language: French
- Box office: $5.8 million

The Favourite Son (original title: Le Fils préféré) is a 1994 French drama film directed by Nicole Garcia and written by François Dupeyron, Jacques Fieschi and Garcia. It stars Gérard Lanvin, Bernard Giraudeau and Jean-Marc Barr.

== Cast ==
- Gérard Lanvin as Jean-Paul Mantegna
- Bernard Giraudeau as Francis
- Jean-Marc Barr as Philippe
- Roberto Herlitzka as Raphaël
- Margherita Buy as Anna Maria
- Karin Viard as Martine
- Antoinette Moya as Odetta
- Pierre Mondy as The dentist

== Awards and nominations ==
- César Awards (France)
  - Won: Best Actor – Leading Role (Gérard Lanvin)
  - Nominated: Best Actor – Supporting Role (Bernard Giraudeau)
  - Nominated: Best Director (Nicole Garcia)
  - Nominated: Best Film
- Karlovy Vary Film Festival (Czech Republic)
  - Nominated: Crystal Globe (Nicole Garcia)
