= Nothing to Make a Fuss About =

1953 French novel by Roger Nimier

- Author: Roger Nimier
- Original title: Histoire d'un amour
- Language: French
- Publisher: Éditions Gallimard
- Publication date: 1953
- Publication place: France
- English publication date: 1954
- Pages: 280

Nothing to Make a Fuss About (French: Histoire d'un amour) is a 1953 novel by the French writer Roger Nimier. The narrative is set in Paris right after World War I. It tells the story of a female ex-ambulance driver with a passion for the arts, who falls in love with a disillusioned Austrian painter, while she in turn is adored by a young woman. The novel was published in English in 1954, as part of an omnibus volume titled Children of Circumstance.

The novel was the basis for the 1961 film Time Out for Love. The film was directed by Jean Valère and stars Micheline Presle, Maurice Ronet and Jean Seberg.
