= Les Spécialistes =

- Theatrical release poster
- Directed by: Patrice Leconte
- Written by: Michel Blanc; Patrick Dewolf; Patrice Leconte; Bruno Tardon
- Produced by: Christian Fechner; Bernard Artigues
- Starring: Bernard Giraudeau; Gérard Lanvin
- Cinematography: Eduardo Serra
- Edited by: Joëlle Hache
- Music by: Éric Demarsan
- Production companies: Films A2; Les Films Christian Fechner
- Distributed by: Gaumont Distribution
- Release date: 13 March 1985
- Running time: 94 min
- Country: France
- Language: French
- Box office: 5,319,542 admissions (France)

Les Spécialistes (French pronunciation: [le spesjalist]) is a 1985 French action film directed by Patrice Leconte.

== Plot ==
Notorious safe cracker Stéphane Carella, who has been imprisoned for some time and longs for retirement once he is released in a year, is transported through the Verdon Gorge to another penal facility when his transport encounters another police van, which has suffered an accident. The sole inmate in that transport, police killer Paul Brandon, is handcuffed to Carella, but as soon as they are left unattended for a moment, Brandon makes a run for it, dragging Carella with him. After evading the police search parties, they find shelter at the farm of Laura, a young woman who despises the police after her husband was killed in a botched raid.

As time passes in hiding, Carella and Brandon gradually become friends. Brandon suggests to Cartella to undertake one last coup: Robbing a high-security vault at the casino Mazetti in Nice. As it turns out, however, Brandon is an undercover police officer. The casino, owned by a mafioso named Mazetti, serves as an underground money laundering facility; Brandon was assigned by Kovacs, his superior, to raid the casino's vault with Carella's help, to ignite a gang war between Mazetti and his rivals, and use the fracas to arrest those who remain. With Laura's assistance, they pose as insurance agents to check the vault's security system (which includes a pressure sensor floor) and prepare for their burglary. As they return to the farm, Carella protests against the formidability of the security measures and leaves the car; but before he can get away, two policemen surreptitiously trailing them pose as Mafia henchmen and stage a kidnapping in order to get him back on the mission. As Brandon comes to his rescue, Carella exchanges gunfire with one of his assailants, apparently killing him. The next morning, however, he discovers that only blanks were used and forces Brandon to confess his true agenda. In return, Brandon promises that Kovacs will remit six months off Carella's remaining penalty if he participates; partly for this reason, Carella agrees to the deal.

After a period of meticulous preparation including electronic surveillance and the interception of discarded security video tapes, Brandon and Carella infiltrate the casino through its underground parking lot, make their way to the vault and deceive the security systems. After looting the safe and securing their escape route, they deliberately trigger the alarm and escape by car, as per the plan. Driving through a narrow gateway, they manage to trap Mazetti and his henchmen, who pursue them, inside their car; the three men are shortly afterwards killed by one of Mazetti's American mafia customers for his failure to safeguard the money. Brandon and Cartella part ways at this point, Brandon wishing to spare his partner any more prison time. However, when he attempts to deliver the stolen money to Kovacs, it turns out that Carella and Laura have absconded with the real money because they believe that all three of them make too good a team to break up now.

While Laura leaves for Australia to prepare a later rendezvous, Brandon tracks Carella down to a strip mine, but in the end decides to let him go. As Carella prepares to leave, he is intercepted by mafia enforcers and his police assailants, but Brandon comes to his aid with a huge dump truck and neutralizes their opponents. Realizing that Kovacs is in with the mafia and has set them up, Corella demands of Brandon to call Kovacs via car phone, who confirms this suspicion by ordering Brandon to kill Carella, making it look like he was shot while trying to escape. After some consideration, Brandon furiously calls Kovac again to quit his job, and then he and Carella depart with the money to rejoin Laura in Australia.

== Cast ==
- Bernard Giraudeau – Paul Brandon
- Gérard Lanvin – Stéphane Carella
- Christiane Jean – Laura
- Maurice Barrier – Kovacs
- Daniel Jégou – Casino director
- Bertie Cortez – Mazetti

== Reception ==
=== Box office ===
When it was theatrically released, Les Spécialistes met with enormous commercial success, taking the head of the Parisian box office for two consecutive weeks, recording a result of 646,367 admissions, including a start at 408,125 admissions. Finally, it ended its run in Paris with 1,082,963 admissions. The success was confirmed in the provinces, with more than 4 million admissions, bringing the total to 5,319,542 admissions in France, allowing it to be classified in third position of the best entries in France behind the French film Trois hommes et un couffin and Rambo II, and in second position for the best admissions in France for a French film the same year.

=== Critical response ===
The critical response to this film was generally very positive in France. Critic Cécile Mury wrote in Télérama: “Clever, entertaining, the film also plays with clichés, exploiting them with irony without condoning them." In 1987, Télé 7 Jours stated, "Action, stunts, staging and a great Giraudeau-Lanvin duo."
