= The Foundling's War =

1977 novel by Michel Déon

- 1977 edition
- Author: Michel Déon
- Original title: Les Vingt ans du jeun homme vert
- Translator: Julian Evans
- Language: French
- Publisher: Éditions Gallimard
- Publication date: 21 January 1977
- Publication place: France
- English publication date: 13 October 2014
- Pages: 376
- ISBN: 9782070296057

The Foundling's War is a 1977 novel by the French writer Michel Déon. Its French title is les Vingt ans du jeune homme vert, which means "the twenty years of the green young man". It is set in occupied Paris during World War II and follows a young man who grew up as an adoptive child and navigates through the social turmoil around him.

The book is a sequel to The Foundling Boy from 1975, which is set during the interwar period. The Foundling's War was published by éditions Gallimard in 1977. An English translation by Julian Evans was published in 2014 through Gallic Books.

== Reception ==
Nancy Kline of The New York Times reviewed the book in 2015, and described it as "a sprawling 19th-century-style novel". Kline questioned the author's sense of humour from a political standpoint, and wrote that "[Déon's] jokes call his politics into question. ... [J]okes about homosexuals and Jewish noses, especially in the context of the 1940s, are at best in questionable taste. Déon’s prolix, cynical novel, ably translated, may amuse some readers. Others, not."
