= Unpredictable Nature of the River =

- Directed by: Bernard Giraudeau
- Written by: Bernard Giraudeau
- Produced by: Jean-François Lepetit
- Starring: Bernard Giraudeau; Richard Bohringer
- Cinematography: Jean-Marie Dreujou
- Edited by: Anick Baly
- Music by: René-Marc Bini
- Production companies: Canal+; Flach Film; Les Films de la Saga
- Distributed by: Pyramide Distribution (France); Progress Filmverleih (Germany); Cecchi Gori Group (Italy)
- Release date: 3 April 1996 (France)
- Running time: 109 minutes
- Countries: France; Germany; Italy
- Language: French
- Box office: 838.638 entries

Unpredictable Nature of the River (French: Les caprices d'un fleuve) is a 1996 French drama film directed by Bernard Giraudeau.

== Cast ==
- Bernard Giraudeau as Jean-François de La Plaine
- Richard Bohringer as Commander de Blanet
- Thierry Frémont as Pierre Combaud
- Roland Blanche as Monsieur Denis
- Raoul Billerey as Father Fleuriau
- Aissatou Sow as Amélie
- France Zobda as Anne Brisseau
- Olivier Achard as Monsieur de Kermadec
- Vincent de Bouard as The Knight of Marcera
- Moussa Touré as Hannibal
- Anna Galiena as Louise de Saint-Agnan
- Pierre Arditi as Henri de Breuil
- Jean-Claude Brialy as Monsieur de Saint-Chamont
- Marie Dubois as The old duchess
- Lambert Wilson as Monsieur de la Malène
- Sophie Artur as Eléonore
- Jean-Claude Jay as Iphicrate
- Philippe Laudenbach as Nicolas de Saint-James
- Sara Giraudeau as The young girl
- Brigitte Roüan as Esther

== Production ==
Filming took place in Senegal, more precisely in Sine-Saloum, Futa Tooro and Saint-Louis.

== Accolades ==
| Year | Award | Category | Recipient | Result |
|---|---|---|---|---|
| 1997 | 22nd César Awards | Best Original Music | René-Marc Bini | Nominated |
| 1997 | 22nd César Awards | Best Cinematography | Jean-Marie Dreujou | Nominated |
