= Hussards (literary movement) =

Anti-existentialist literary movement

The Hussards was a group of French authors during the 1950s who opposed Existentialism and leftist political activism among intellectuals such as Jean-Paul Sartre.

== Origins ==
Its name was invented by the literary critic Bernard Frank, who referred to several people by the ironic name of "hussards" (French for "hussars") in an article published in December 1952 in the journal Les Temps modernes, titled "Grognards et hussards" ("Old Guards and Hussars"). Frank chose that name partly because of Roger Nimier's novel The Blue Hussar (Le Hussard bleu).

== Membership ==
The main Hussards were considered to be Jacques Chardonne and Paul Morand, and the group also included Antoine Blondin, Michel Déon, Jacques Laurent and Roger Nimier. The interested members rejected the name "Hussards", Michel Déon (in Bagages pour Vancouver) and Jacques Laurent (in Histoire égoïste) denying the very existence of such a group. However, other authors were conscious affiliates, such as Kléber Haedens, Stephen Hecquet, Geneviève Dormann, Félicien Marceau, Jacques Perret and Pol Vandromme.

The Hussards were advocates of conservatism in general, and often of the monarchist party Action Française (AF) in particular. Almost all of the Hussards later participated with the Cahiers de la Table Ronde, renamed La Table Ronde, a review created for the purpose of contesting the predominance of the publication Les Temps modernes and edited by Roland Laudenbach to which famous writers such as François Mauriac, Jean Giono or Jean Paulhan contributed.

== Bibliography ==
(in French)

- Raphaël Chauvancy, Jacques Laurent, Éditions Pardès, coll. « Qui suis-je? », 2009.
- Marc Dambre, (dir.) Les hussards Une génération littéraire, Paris, Presses Sorbonne Nouvelle, 2000.
- François Dufay, Le soufre et le moisi. La droite littéraire après 1945. Chardonne, Morand et les hussards, Paris, Perrin, 2006. ISBN 2-262-01907-X
- Bernard Frank, "Grognards & Hussards", Les Temps modernes, 1952. Réédition dans Grognards & Hussards, suivi de La Turquie, Paris, Le Dilettante, 1984.
- Pol Vandromme, La Droite buissonnière, Paris, Les Sept Couleurs, 1960.
