= Julian Evans (adventurer) =

British adventurer (born 1977)

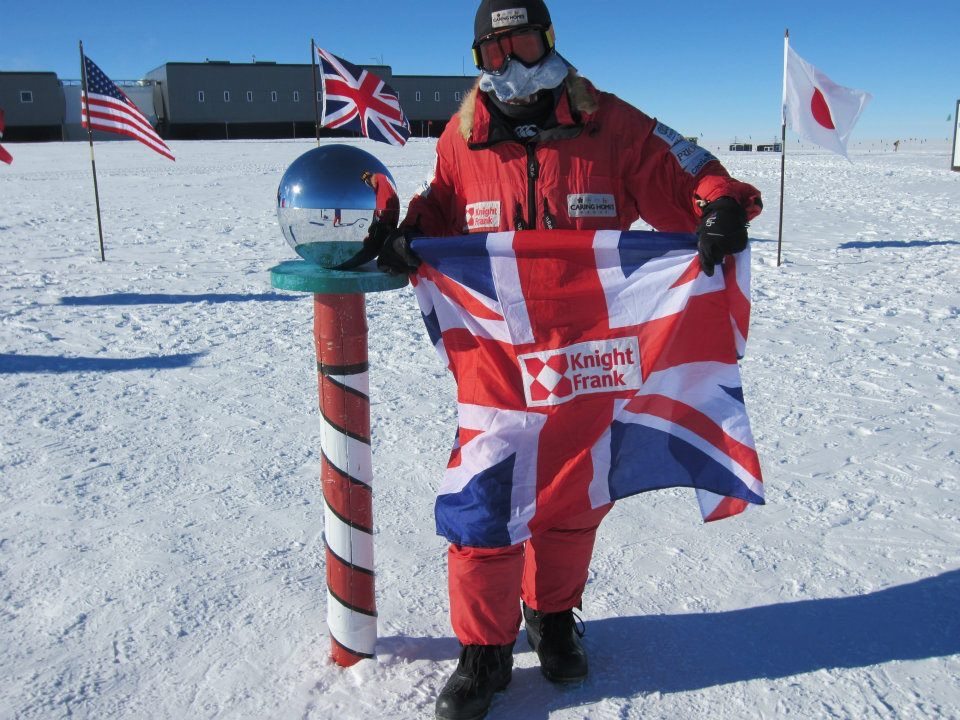

Julian Evans is a British adventurer and fund-raiser. Born in Leicestershire, and educated at Oakham School, he is a Fellow of the Royal Institution of Chartered Surveyors, Fellow of The Royal Geographical Society, member of The Explorers Club and Alpine Club. He grew up in Lyddington, Rutland but now lives in Great Easton, Leicestershire.

He is one of only circa 100 people in the world to walk to both the North Pole (Magnetic) and South Pole (Geographic), 378th Briton to reach the summit of Mount Everest and the 45th Briton (and 420th person in the world) to complete the Seven Summits.

The Seven Summits comprises the highest mountain on each continent; Everest (Asia), Kilimanjaro (Africa), Mount Elbrus (Europe), Mount Vinson (Antarctica), Denali (North America), Aconcagua (South America) and Puncak Jaya (Oceania). In 2023 he returned to summit Kilimanjaro, with Rolfe Oostra, which they achieved from the national park gates, to summit, and back to the gates, in a rapid 33 hours.

Other notable achievements include summiting Mont Blanc and the Matterhorn (with Kenton Cool). He has also completed the Marathon Des Sables and cycled from Land's End to John O'Groats. In 2023 he completed a skydive near Everest by exiting a helicopter at c.24,000 ft.

Evans' 2019 Everest expedition was filmed and the documentary, Everest for Hambo, was released on Amazon Prime in 2023. Everest for Hambo is an entirely different rendition of the Everest journey, shaped by the warmth and purpose of the people climbing it. The film’s narrative is shaped by the escapades of Julian Evans, Sean James, Stuart Kershaw, Yuri Kruglov and their patron ‘Hambo’, whose own story and resilience parallels that of the climbers. Matt Hampson, ‘Hambo’, is an ex England rugby player who suffered an accident whilst training for England that left him paralysed from the neck down. Matt has since gone on to raise money to build a rehabilitation centre which helps other young people with spinal injuries.

Through sponsors, his expeditions has raised almost £2 million in donations for several charities, most notably The Matt Hampson Foundation, Myeloma UK, the Progressive Supranuclear Palsy Association and Great Ormond Street Hospital.
