= The Blue Hussar =

1950 novel by Roger Nimier

- First UK edition
- Author: Roger Nimier
- Original title: Le Hussard bleu
- Translator: Jacques Le Clercq
- Cover artist: Felix Topolski
- Language: French
- Publisher: Éditions Gallimard
- Publication date: 28 September 1950
- Publication place: France
- English publication date: 1952 UK MacGibbon & Kee (UK); 1953 Julian Messner (US)
- Pages: 334

The Blue Hussar (French: Le hussard bleu) is a 1950 novel by the French writer Roger Nimier. Set in Germany in 1945–1946, it tells the story of ten French hussars who operate in the French occupation army right after World War II. The perspective shifts between several different people. At the centre are the ambivalent François Sanders and his companion François Saint-Anne—the title character—who unknowingly share the same German mistress.

Sanders was also the main character of Nimier's previous novel, Les Épées from 1948. The Blue Hussar was published in English in 1952 translated by John Russell and Anthony Rhodes (publ. MacGibbon & Kee. UK) and then again in 1953, translated by Jacques Le Clercq (publ. Julian Messner, US).

== Reception ==
Frank Alberts of The Saturday Review wrote that the book "will come as a blessed relief to readers fatigued by the leaden tones of much recent American war fiction. Nimier writes easily, has a gift for keeping his story on the move, and shows maturity in refusing to allow his ideas more space than they really deserve." Alberts praised the depiction of Sanders but was let down by Saint-Anne's storyline. He described the English translation as "short shrift".

== Legacy ==
The novel gave name to the literary movement les Hussards. In a 1952 article for Les Temps modernes, the journalist Bernard Frank tried to define the movement and its extent. He identified Nimier as its leader and used Nimier's most famous novel to coin the movement's name.
