= Un taxi mauve =

1973 novel by Michel Déon

- 1973 edition
- Author: Michel Déon
- Language: French
- Publisher: Éditions Gallimard
- Publication date: 13 April 1973
- Publication place: France
- Pages: 320

Un taxi mauve ("a mauve taxi") is a 1973 novel by the French writer Michel Déon. It tells the story of a man who settles on the Irish countryside, where he encounters and befriends a number of mysterious and eccentric persons.

The novel received the Grand Prix du roman de l'Académie française. It was adapted into the 1977 film The Purple Taxi, directed by Yves Boisset.

== Plot ==
A man settles on the Beara Peninsula in Ireland, where he plans to lead an idle life devoted to reading, music and hunting. He befriends a number of unusual people. Jerry Kean, an Irish-American who has returned to the land of his forefathers, comes from an affluent family but is lost in life. Jerry's sister Sharon is a beautiful, mysterious and provocative woman who has married into German royalty. His other sister, Moira, is an internationally famous film actress. Taubelman is an avid story teller shrouded in mystery. His supposed daughter Anne is voluntarily mute. Seamus Scully is a retired medical doctor who travels across the landscape in a purple taxi.

The narrator first develops feelings for Sharon and then becomes fascinated by Anne. He becomes friends with Jerry, while the mystery surrounding Taubelman sets the atmosphere for numerous hunting parties, walks with faithful dogs and visits to countryside pubs.

== Adaptation ==
The feature film The Purple Taxi, directed by Yves Boisset, premiered in competition at the 1977 Cannes Film Festival. It stars an ensemble cast which includes Charlotte Rampling, Peter Ustinov, Edward Albert, Fred Astaire, Agostina Belli and Philippe Noiret.
