= Jean-Claude Missiaen =

French film director and critic (1939–2024)

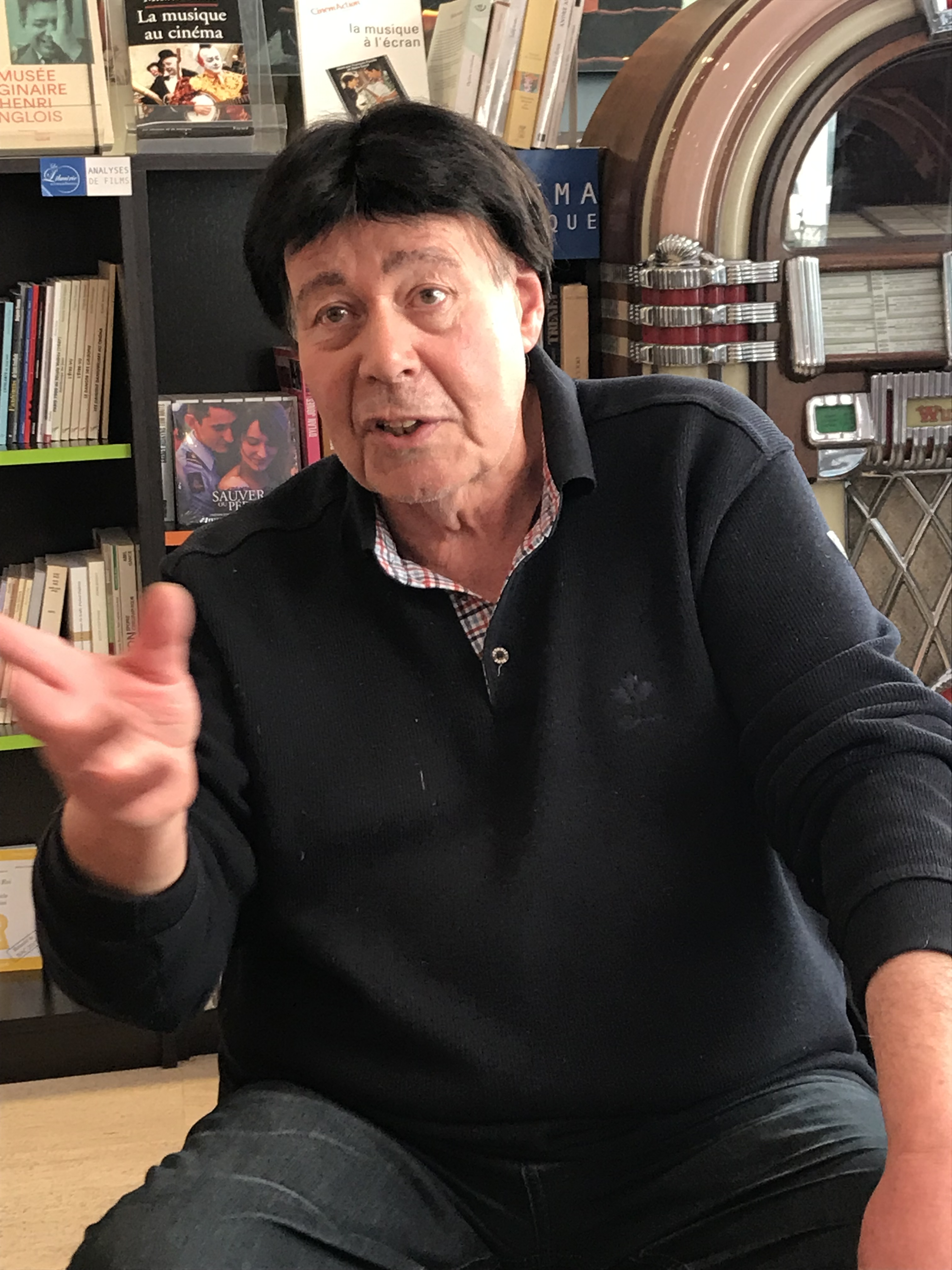
- Missiaen in 2019
- Born: 18 August 1939; Paris, France
- Died: 22 October 2024 (aged 85)
- Occupations: Film director Film critic

Jean-Claude Missiaen (18 August 1939 – 22 October 2024) was a French film director and critic.

Missiaen died on 22 October 2024, at the age of 85.

== Filmography ==
- Tir groupé (1982)
- Ronde de nuit (1984)
- La Baston (1985)
- Les Hordes (1991)

== Publications ==
- Anthony Mann (1964)
- Howard Hawks (1966)
- Jean Gabin (1977)
- Cyd Charisse. Du ballet classique à la comédie musicale (1979)
- Le cinéma en héritage. Mémoires (2017)
