= Sara Giraudeau =

French actress

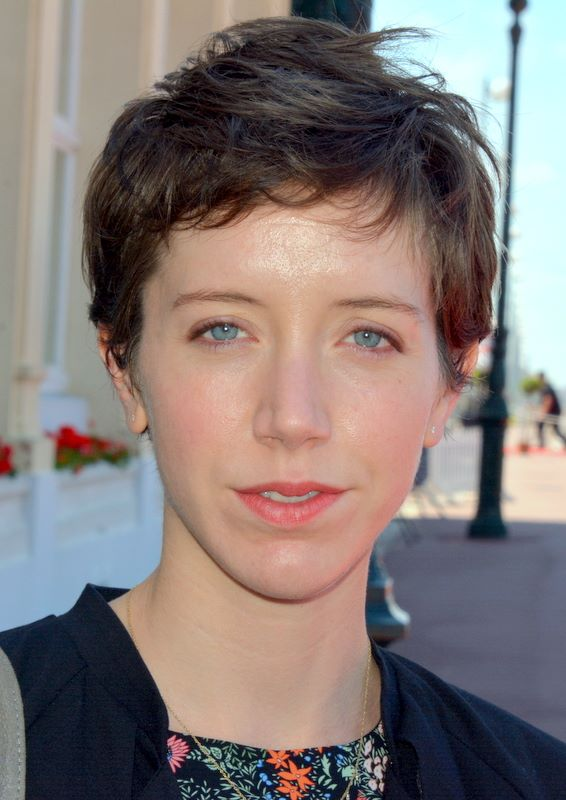
- Giraudeau in 2015
- Born: 1 August 1985 (age 40); Boulogne-Billancourt, France
- Occupation: Actress
- Years active: 1996–present
- Partner: Simon Hubert (2010-present)
- Children: 3

Sara Giraudeau (born 1 August 1985) is a French actress.

== Career ==
She grew up with two parents who were actors, and made her first on-screen appearance when she was only 10, in the movie Les caprices d'un fleuve directed by her father. In 2018, she won the César Award for Best Supporting Actress for Bloody Milk.

On television, she's most known for playing Marina Loiseau in the TV Series The Bureau broadcast on Canal+ from 2015 to 2020.

She made her debut in theater with The Vagina Monologues in 2005. She won the Molière Award for Best Female Newcomer and the Raimu Award for Best Newcomer in 2007 for La Valse des pingouins and the Molière Award for Best Actress for Le Syndrome de l'oiseau in 2023.

== Life ==
Sara Giraudeau is the daughter of Anny Duperey and Bernard Giraudeau. She has an older brother named Gaël.

She lives with the actor Simon Hubert. They have three daughters, born May 22, 2011, June 28, 2016, and March 2022. The middle daughter shares a birthday with her grandmother, Anny.

== Theatre ==
Year	Title	Author	Director	Notes
2005	The Vagina Monologues	Eve Ensler	Isabelle Rattier	
2007	La Valse des pingouins	Patrick Haudecœur	Jacques Décombe	Molière Award for Best Female Newcomer; Raimu Award for Best Newcomer
2008	Sentimental Tectonics	Éric-Emmanuel Schmitt	Éric-Emmanuel Schmitt	
2009-10	Twelfth Night	William Shakespeare	Nicolas Briançon	
2010-11	Colombe	Jean Anouilh	Michel Fagadau	
2012	The Lark	Jean Anouilh	Christophe Lidon	
2013-14	Zelda & Scott	Renaud Meyer	Renaud Meyer	
2016	L'envol	Pierre Tré-Hardy	Thierry Harcourt	
2022-24	Le Syndrome de l'oiseau	Pierre Tré-Hardy	Sara Giraudeau & Renaud Meyer	Molière Award for Best Actress

== Filmography ==
Year	Title	Role	Director	Notes
1996	Unpredictable Nature of the River	The young girl	Bernard Giraudeau	
2008	Marie et Madeleine	Josy	Joyce Buñuel	TV movie
2008	Les poissons marteaux	Ella	André Chandelle	TV movie Luchon International Film Festival - Best Actress
2009	L'évasion	Julia	Laurence Katrian	TV movie
2010	Imogène McCarthery	Nancy Nankett	Alexandre Charlot & Franck Magnier	
2010	Mémoires d'une jeune fille dérangée	Lola	Keren Marciano	Short
2010	Le Roi, l'Écureuil et la Couleuvre	Marie-Madeleine Fouquet	Laurent Heynemann	TV series (2 episodes)
2013	Denis	Nathalie	Lionel Bailliu	
2013	Boule & Bill	Caroline	Alexandre Charlot & Franck Magnier	
2014	Beauty and the Beast	Clotilde	Christophe Gans	
2015	Les Bêtises	Sonia	Alice & Rose Philippon	Nominated - César Award for Most Promising Actress; Nominated - Lumière Award for Best Female Revelation
2015	Rosalie Blum	Cécile	Julien Rappeneau	
2015	Les fusillés	Marguerite	Philippe Triboit	TV movie
2015-20	The Bureau	Marina Loiseau	Éric Rochant, Samuel Collardey, ...	TV series (43 episodes); Nominated - ACS Award for Best Actress (2016); Nominated - Globe de Cristal Award for Best Actress - Television Film or Television Series (2019)
2016	Vendeur	Chloé	Sylvain Desclous	
2016	Daddy or Mommy 2	Bénédicte	Martin Bourboulon	
2017	Bloody Milk	Pascale Chavanges	Hubert Charuel	César Award for Best Supporting Actress
2017	Et mon coeur transparent	Marie-Marie	David & Raphaël Vital-Durand	
2018-20	50 nuances de Grecs	Métis / Arachnée	Mathieu Signolet	TV series (5 episodes)
2019	Les envoûtés	Coline	Pascal Bonitzer	
2019	The Translators	Rose-Marie Houeix	Régis Roinsard	
2019	Calls	Anne Larcher	Timothée Hochet	TV series (1 episode)
2019	Criminal: France	Émilie Weber	Frédéric Mermoud	TV series (1 episode)
2020	The Speech	Sonia	Laurent Tirard	
2020	Médecin de nuit	Sofia	Elie Wajeman	
2020	Particules Fines	Delphine	Anne-Claire Jaulin	Short
2020	Si tu vois ma mère	Ohiana	Nathanaël Guedj	TV movie
2021	Adieu Monsieur Haffmann	Blanche Mercier	Fred Cavayé	
2021	Borderline	Catherine	Julien Boisselier & Simon Hubert	Short
2022	The Sixth Child	Anna	Léopold Legrand	
2022	La page blanche	Eloïse Leroy	Murielle Magellan	
2023	Bernadette	Claude Chirac	Léa Domenach	
2023	Tout va bien	Marion Lafarge	Audrey Estrougo, Xavier Legrand, ...	TV Series (8 episodes)
2024	Jim's Story	Olivia	Arnaud & Jean-Marie Larrieu	
2025	French Lover	Marion	Lisa-Nina Rives	
2026	Another Day	Pauline	Jeanne Herry	
TBA	On the Edge		Reda Kateb	Pre-Production
