= Frédéric Musso =

French writer (1941–2020)

- Born: 3 February 1941; Algiers, French Algeria
- Died: 5 September 2020 (aged 79)
- Occupations: Writer; Poet

Frédéric Musso (3 February 1941 – 5 September 2020) was an Algerian-born French writer, poet, and journalist.

== Biography ==
Musso was born in Algiers to a family of Sardinian descent. He studied at the Collège Notre-Dame-d'Afrique in Algiers, where he discovered the works of Victor Hugo. After failing in his higher studies, he turned to writing and journalism. He began his writing career working for Claude Tenne, a member of the Organisation armée secrète and evading prison on Île de Ré, for his work on Mais le Diable marche avec nous. He wrote his first novel, La Déesse, in the 1960s, although it was not published until 1975. The novel received the Prix Roger Nimier the year it was published, giving Musso notoriety in the literary world. He subsequently wrote three novels and four essays, one of which was devoted to Albert Camus, before he began focusing on poetry. He worked for Paris Match from 1988 to 2003.

Frédéric Musso lived in Générargues until his death. He died on 5 September 2020 at the age of 79.

== Works ==
- Arthur Rimbaud (1972)
- La Déesse (1975)
- L'Algérie des souvenirs (1976)
- Martin est aux Afriques (1978)
- La Longue-vue (1983)
- Le Point sur l'île (1983)
- Dans les murs (1985)
- Un pékin en Chine (1988)
- Les mots dorment loin du rivage (1997)
- Orvieto (2002)
- Albert Camus ou la Fatalité des natures (2006)
- L'Imparfait du fugitif (2010)
- L'Exil et sa demeure (2013)
- Le Petit Bouddha de bronze (2014)
- Le Soleil et la Source (2016)
