= Michel Déon =

French novelist and literary columnist

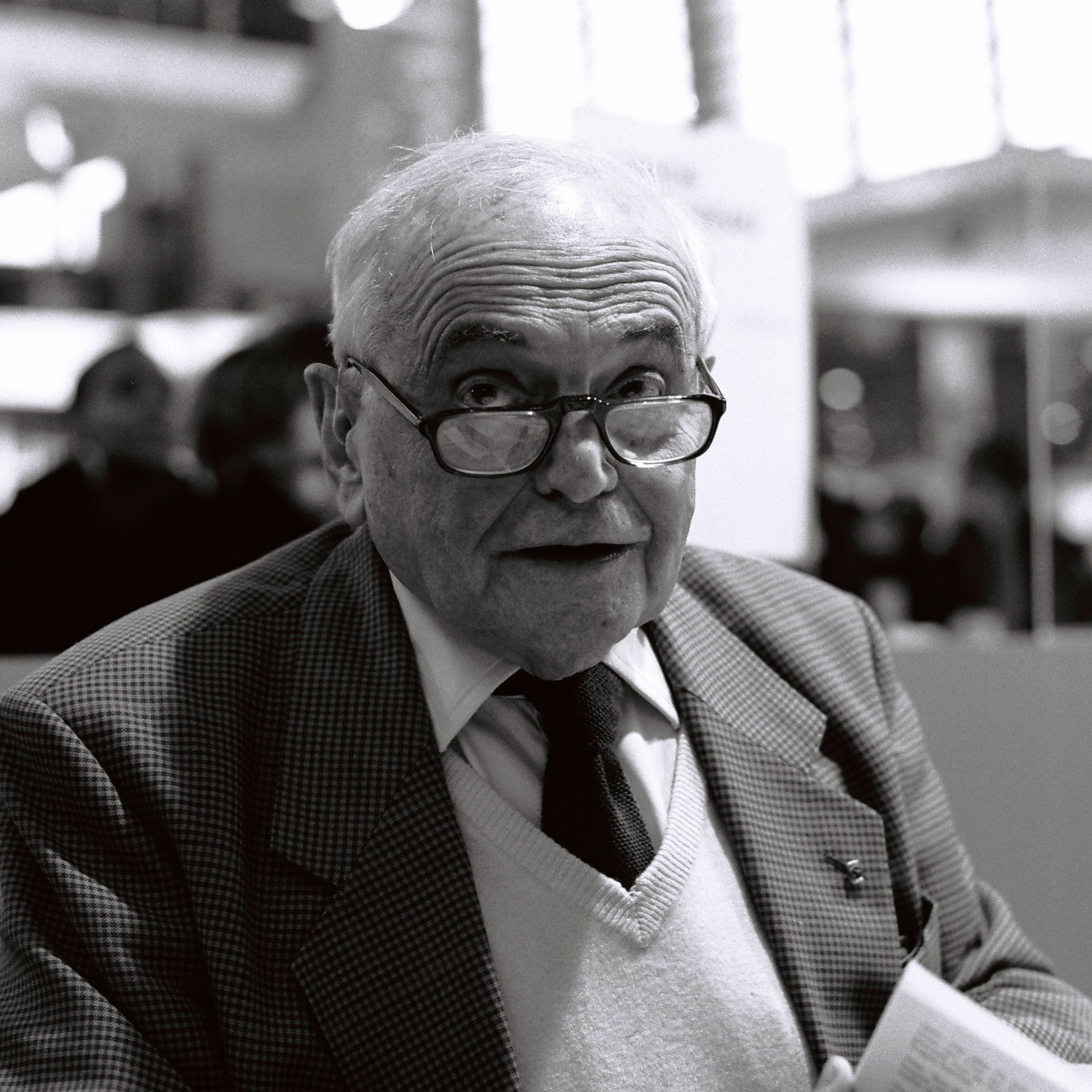
- Michel Déon in 2012
- Born: Édouard Michel; 4 August 1919; Paris, France
- Died: 28 December 2016 (aged 97); Galway, Ireland
- Education: Lycée Janson-de-Sailly
- Occupations: Writer, playwright, editor
- Spouse: Chantal Déon
- Children: 2
- Writing career
- Genres: Novels, essays, theater
- Notable works: Les Poneys sauvages (1970); Un taxi mauve (1973); The Foundling Boy (1975)
- Notable awards: Prix Interallié; Grand Prix du roman de l'Académie française Commander of the Legion of Honour; Académie française, Seat 8
- Literary movement: Hussards

Michel Déon (French: [deɔ̃]; 4 August 1919 – 28 December 2016) was a French novelist and literary columnist. He published over 50 works and was the recipient of numerous awards, including the Prix Interallié for his 1970 novel, Les Poneys sauvages (The Wild Ponies). Déon's 1973 novel Un taxi mauve received the Grand Prix du roman de l'Académie française. His novels have been translated into numerous languages.

He is considered to have been one of the most innovative French writers of the 20th century. In 1978, Déon was elected to the Académie française.

== Early years ==
Michel Déon was born in Paris on 4 August 1919, the only child of a civil servant and his wife. His father took his family along on the many foreign trips his work required, stimulating his son's interest in travel and cross-cultural relations that came to define his writings. Déon's father died in 1933 while on assignment in Monaco serving as advisor to Prince Louis. He and his mother returned to Paris, where Déon attended the Lycée Janson-de-Sailly. Although he was passionate about literature and journalism, Déon acquiesced to familial pressure and studied law in college.

Born a year after the end of World War I, he adopted the pacifism popular with many others of his generation. When drafted into the French military, he was assigned to the 152nd regiment under General de Lattre. Back to civil life, he was secretary to Charles Maurras, an elderly writer and poet, member of the Académie française since 1938, and the main inspiration behind Action Française, a counter-revolutionary, monarchist political movement who embraced collaboration. In Lyon, Deon mostly helped Maurras in editing the quality newspaper of the same name. Maurras, a fatherly figure, instilled in the young Déon a distaste for both demagogy and fascism. Déon said that freedom is his highest value, both in life and for the individual. This crucial experience is related in Déon's book of memories, "les Vingt ans du jeune homme vert" ( or Green young man, see below.)

== Career ==
At the end of World War II, Déon returned to Paris to dedicate himself to a literary career. He first worked for a series of small-press French newspapers to support himself while drafting a novel and short stories. His first collection of short stories, Adieux à Sheila, was published in 1944.

Shortly after his first publication, Déon received a Rockefeller Foundation grant that supported his travels through the United States. While there, Déon worked alongside William Faulkner and Saul Bellow. Their collaboration proved beneficial for all three of them and Déon assisted Bellow in translating his works into French.

Alongside such contemporary French writers as Jacques Laurent, Antoine Blondin, and Roger Nimier, Déon staunchly opposed the existentialism of Sartre and other prominent cultural figures. Déon and his fellow authors became known as Les Hussards, named after Nimier's novel The Blue Hussar. They were recognized for their innovative unconventionality, sympathy for the bizarre underdog, and pervasive refusal to adopt fashionable themes and tone.

In 1944, Roland Laudenbach and Jean Cocteau founded Éditions de la Table ronde (Round Table Publishing), a publishing enterprise that published works by many members of Les Hussards. Table ronde published several of Déon's novels, including Les Gens de la Nuit, La Carotte et le Bâton, and Tout L'Amour du Monde II. After Table ronde became a subsidiary of Éditions Gallimard around 1970, Gallimard published more than twenty of Déon's works.

In 1970, Déon's novel Les Poneys sauvages (The Wild Ponies) was awarded the Prix Interallié, given annually since 1930 to the best novel written by a journalist.

Déon wrote his critical masterpiece Un taxi mauve (A Purple Taxi) in 1973. It became an immediate literary sensation and won the Grand Prix du Roman de l'Académie française. Un Taxi Mauve was made into a film in 1977. The following year, 1978, Déon was elected to the Académie française.

In addition to his numerous individual works and awards, Déon has collaborated with several public figures. In 1953, he assisted Coco Chanel in writing her autobiography, though she refused to have it published. Déon destroyed the only existing copy for the sake of his friendship with her. In 1966, Déon worked with Salvador Dalí on the artist's memoirs, Diary of a Genius.

== Personal life ==
Much of Déon's work engages his experience via travel to such locations as Switzerland, Italy, Canada, and Portugal. During the 1940s, he explored the United States by Greyhound Bus.

Déon was an affiliate member of the Portuguese Academy of Science and Letters. He is a doctor honoris causa at the universities of Athens and Ireland. He is also an honorary citizen of Nice, Aix-en-Provence, and Antibes. His works have been translated into many languages.

Déon and his wife Chantal raised their two children, Alice and Alexandre, on the small Greek island of Spetsai. When the children reached school age in 1968, France was in a state of upheaval. The Déon family settled in Ireland. For over forty years, Déon and his family made Ireland their home, raising Chantal's fifty horses. There Déon wrote on his Louis XVI desk. He visited France frequently.

Déon died from a pulmonary embolism at the age of 97 on 28 December 2016 in Galway, Ireland.

== Novels ==
Les Poneys Sauvages (1970) is a story of murder, intrigue, and revenge. It begins in 1937, as George, Barry, Cyril, and Horace, students of varying backgrounds, complete their educations at the University of Cambridge. As the decade ends, the group becomes tangled in the Second World War. Those who survive the war take the reader on a journey that spans three decades and covers all of Europe, from Italy to Poland and back to Paris. As the friends age, they learn that the past is not forgotten quickly. In 1981, it was the basis of a six-part television series that starred Hélène Vincent.

Un Taxi Mauve (1973) follows a group of troubled European and American expatriates who have settled in rural Ireland – each for his own reason. Living in a self-punishing exile, their interactions create a tangle of love and deceit. An English-language film based on the novel, released in 1977 and called The Purple Taxi in English, starred Fred Astaire, Charlotte Rampling, and Philippe Noiret.

In The Foundling Boy (Le Jeune Homme Vert) (1975), the infant Jean, born in 1919, is adopted by a rural couple who help maintain a wealthy family's estate. The novel follows his adventures and those of several others, notably the owner of the estate on which he is raised, until he joins the French army at the start of World War II. Diane Johnson compared Jean to Fielding's Tom Jones, noting how "his picaresque adventures unfold in cheerful profusion, in and out of foreign countries and strange beds". She also recommended the novel for its depiction of the European political climate in the years between the world wars. A sequel, The Foundling's War (Les Vingt Ans du Jeune Homme Vert), appeared in 1977.

In Un Souvenir (1990), Edward has just passed his sixtieth year and is beginning to consider himself an old man. He finds an old photo from 1936. It shows him hugging a beautiful girl named Sheila, an obscure yet unforgettable woman he met in England during the war. Despite his age, he returns to England to find her and come to terms with the regret and guilt at having lost her.

In Pages Grecques (1993), Déon explores the multi-layered mythical and actual history of Greek culture. Employing the gods, muses, and legendary Greek figures, alongside historical events and characters, Déon weaves Greece's dual histories together to create a beautiful and inspiring picture of the culture.

The Great and the Good (La Cour Des Grands, 1996) follows the life of Arthur Morgan, the son of an impoverished French widow. He is offered a first class boat ticket to the United States in 1950 and there experiences all the classic elements of the American dream, graduating college and moving to New York City where he becomes a successful stockbroker. When he returns to France in the face of family tragedy, he is forced to reconcile his American life with a past life and is shocked to discover what has become of the friends of his youth.

Horseman, Pass By! (Cavalier, passe ton chemin!, 2005) offers a social history of the Irish people that combines fact and fiction. Exploring the country's extraordinary folklore and cultural legends, Déon examines the nation's collective identity.

== English translations ==
An English translation of Un déjeuner de soleil appeared in 1983 (UK) and 1989 (US) as Where Are You Dying Tonight?. Le Jeune Homme vert appeared as The Foundling Boy in 2013, and the publisher, Gallic Books, published a translation of the sequel, Les Vingt Ans du Jeune Homme Vert as The Foundling's War in 2014. La cour des grands was published as The Great and the Good in 2016 and La chambre de ton père as Your Father's Room in 2017.

== Films / documentaries ==
- 1977 : The Purple Taxi (Un taxi mauve), movie adaptation from Michel Déon's novel, directed by Yves Boisset starring Charlotte Rampling, Fred Astaire, Peter Ustinov, etc.
- 1979 : Le jeune homme vert, television adaptation (Antenne 2), directed by Roger Pigaut with Philippe Deplanche.
- 1982 : Michel Déon (la Part de vérité TF1 collection), documentary directed by Christian Giudicelli and Michèle Armand.
- 1983 : Les Poneys sauvages, TV adaptation from Michel Déon's novel, directed by Robert Mazoyer with Jacques Weber, Michel Duchaussoy, etc.
- 1995 : Michel Déon (Un siècle d'écrivains documentary collection France 3), directed by Pierre Dupouey.
- 2008 : Un souvenir, television adaptation from Michel Déon's novel, directed by Jacques Renard with Daniel Prévost, Valérie Mairesse, etc.
- 2018 : Michel Déon ou la force de l'amitié, documentary directed by Jérémie Carboni with Michel Déon, Jean d'Ormesson, Xavier Darcos, Emmanuel Carrère, Yves Boisset, Milan Kundera, Eric Neuhoff, Antoine Gallimard, Frédéric Vitoux, Nicolas Briançon, Belinda Cannone, Thierry Laurent, etc.

== Bibliography ==
- 1944 Adieux à Sheila (Robert Laffont)
- 1946 Amours perdues (Bordas)
- 1950 Je ne veux jamais l'oublier (Plon)
- 1952 La Corrida (Plon)
- 1954 Le Dieu pâle (Plon)
- 1955 Tout l'amour du monde I, récits (Plon)
- 1955 Plaisirs (Editions de Paris) sous le nom de Michel Férou
- 1956 Lettre à un jeune Rastignac, libelle (Fasquelle)
- 1956 Les Trompeuses Espérances (Plon)
- 1958 Les Gens de la nuit (La Table ronde)
- 1960 La Carotte et le Bâton (La Table ronde)
- 1960 Tout l'amour du monde II, récits (La Table ronde)
- 1964 Louis XIV par lui-même (Gallimard)
- 1965 Le Rendez-vous de Patmos, récits (Gallimard)
- 1967 Un parfum de jasmin (Gallimard)
- 1967 Mégalonose (La Table ronde)
- 1970 Les Poneys sauvages (Gallimard), Prix Interallié
- 1973 Un taxi mauve (Gallimard), (Grand Prix du roman de l'Académie française)
- 1975 The Foundling Boy (Le Jeune Homme vert) (Gallimard)
- 1975 Thomas et l'infini, récit pour enfants, illustrated by Étienne Delessert (Gallimard)
- 1977 The Foundling's War (Les Vingt Ans du jeune homme vert) (Gallimard)
- 1981 Where Are You Dying Tonight? (Un déjeuner de soleil) (Gallimard)
- 1984 Je vous écris d'Italie (Gallimard)
- 1987 La Montée du soir (Gallimard)
- 1987 Ma vie n'est plus un roman (Gallimard)
- 1990 Un souvenir (Gallimard)
- 1992 Le Prix de l'amour (Gallimard)
- 1992 Ariane ou l'oubli (Gallimard)
- 1993 Pages grecques, récits (Le Balcon de Spetsai, Le Rendez-vous de Patmos, Spetsai revisité) (Gallimard)
- 1993 Parlons-en… (in collaboration with Alice Déon) (Gallimard)
- 1995 Je me suis beaucoup promené… (La Table ronde)
- 1995 Une longue amitié, lettres d'André Fraigneau et Michel Déon (La Table ronde)
- 1995 Le Flâneur de Londres (Robert Laffont)
- 1996 The Great and the Good (La Cour des grands) (Gallimard)
- 1998 Madame Rose (Albin Michel)
- 1999 Pages françaises, récits (Mes arches de Noé, Bagages pour Vancouver, Post-Scriptum) (Gallimard)
- 2001 Taisez-vous… j'entends venir un ange (Gallimard)
- 2002 Une affiche bleue et blanche (Gallimard)
- 2002 Mentir est tout un art (Le Rocher)
- 2004 Your Father's Room (La Chambre de ton père) (Gallimard)
- 2005 Horseman, Pass By! (Cavalier, passe ton chemin!) (Gallimard)
- 2006 Œuvres (Gallimard)
- 2009 Lettres de château (Gallimard)
- 2009 Cahier Déon (L'Herne). Previously unpublished documents, essays and letters.
- 2009 Journal (L'Herne)
- 2011 Nouvelles complètes (Gallimard)
- 2011 Tout l'amour du monde
- 2013 À la légère (Finitude)
