= Bernard Giraudeau =

French actor and director (1947–2010)

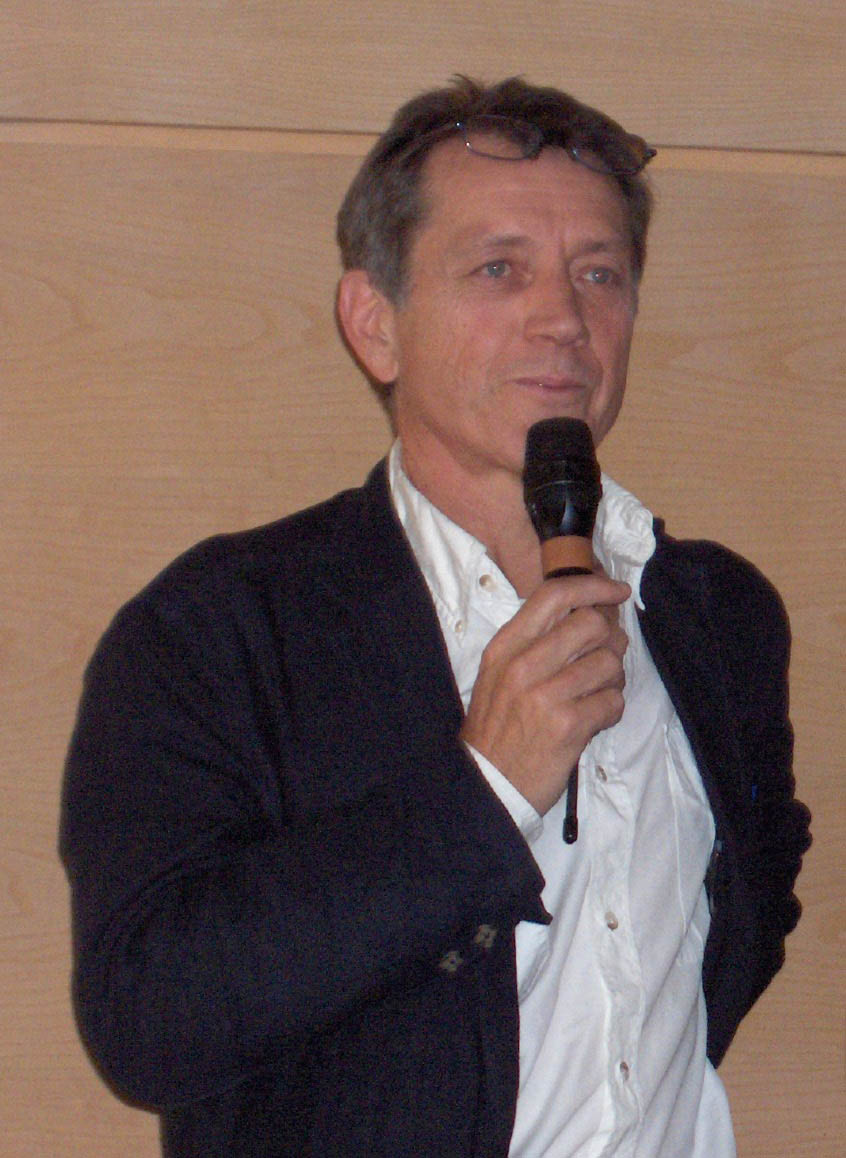
- Bernard Giraudeau in 2007
- Born: 18 June 1947; La Rochelle, Charente-Maritime
- Died: 17 July 2010 (aged 63); Paris, France
- Occupations: Actor, director, producer, scriptwriter
- Years active: 1971–2010
- Spouse: Anny Duperey (1973-1991)
- Children: 2

Bernard René Giraudeau (18 June 1947 – 17 July 2010) was a French sailor, actor, film director, scriptwriter, producer and writer.

== Early life ==
He was born on 18 June 1947 in La Rochelle, Charente-Maritime. In 1963 he enlisted in the French navy as a trainee engineer, qualifying as the first in his class a year later. He served on the helicopter carrier Jeanne d'Arc in 1964–1965 and 1965–1966, and subsequently on the frigate Duquesne and the aircraft carrier Clemenceau before leaving the navy to try his luck as an actor.

== Career ==
Giraudeau first appeared on film in Two Men in Town (1973), and his first film as director was in 1987, though he continued to work as an actor. As a writer, wrote the text of books of photography as well as publishing children's stories (Contes d'Humahuaca, 2002) and several novels. He was also the reader on the French audiobooks of the Harry Potter series. He has also created a recording of The Little Prince, a world renowned book by Antoine de Saint-Exupéry.

== Personal life ==
He was married to actress and author Anny Duperey, with whom he had two children; one of them, Sara Giraudeau, has achieved success as an actress. They separated in 1990.

== Death ==
In 2000 he suffered from cancer which led to the removal of his left kidney, with a subsequent metastasis in 2005 affecting his lungs. He said that the cancer led him to re-evaluate his life and understand himself better. He devoted some of his time to the support of cancer victims through the Institut Curie and the Institut Gustave-Roussy in Paris. He died of his cancer on 17 July 2010 in a Paris hospital.

== Filmography as film actor ==
- 1973: Revolver – Kidnapper
- 1973: Deux Hommes dans la ville (directed by José Giovanni) – Frédéric Cazeneuve
- 1975: Le Gitan (directed by José Giovanni) – Mareuil
- 1976: Jamais plus toujours – Denis
- 1977: Le Juge Fayard dit Le Shériff – Le juge Davoust
- 1977: Bilitis (directed by David Hamilton) – Lucas
- 1977: Moi, fleur bleue – Isidore
- 1977: Et la tendresse ? Bordel ! – Luc
- 1979: Le Toubib (directed by Pierre Granier-Deferre) – François
- 1980: La Boum – Éric Lehman
- 1981: Viens chez moi, j'habite chez une copine (directed by Patrice Leconte) – Daniel
- 1981: Passione d'amore (directed by Ettore Scola) – Capitaine Giorgio Bacchetti
- 1981: Croque la vie (directed by Jean-Charles Tacchella) – Alain
- 1982: Le Grand Pardon (directed by Alexandre Arcady) – Pascal Villars
- 1982: Meurtres à domicile – Max Queryat
- 1982: Hécate (directed by Daniel Schmid) – Julien Rochelle
- 1983: Le Ruffian (directed by José Giovanni) – Gérard
- 1983: Papy fait de la résistance (directed by Jean-Marie Poiré) – Un resistant arrêté
- 1984: Rue barbare (directed by Gilles Béhat) – Chet
- 1984: L'Année des méduses (directed by Christopher Frank) – Romain Kalides
- 1985: Les Spécialistes (directed by Patrice Leconte) – Paul Brandon
- 1985: Bras de fer (directed by Gérard Vergez) – Delancourt
- 1985: Moi vouloir toi – L'ex-ami d'alice
- 1985: Among Wolves – L'exécuteur de De Saintes (uncredited)
- 1986: Les Longs Manteaux – Murat
- 1986: ''Killing Time – Inspector Simon Blount
- 1987: The Veiled Man – Pierre
- 1987: Vent de panique – Roland Pochon
- 1991: La Reine blanche (directed by Jean-Loup Hubert) – Yvon
- 1991: Le coup suprême – Jacques Mercier
- 1992: Après l'amour (directed by Diane Kurys) – David
- 1992: Drôles d'oiseaux (directed by Peter Kassovitz) – Constant Van Loo
- 1993: Une nouvelle vie (directed by Olivier Assayas) – Constantin
- 1994: Elles ne pensent qu'à ça... (directed by Charlotte Dubreuil) – l'homme de la fin
- 1994: Le Fils préféré (directed by Nicole Garcia) – Francis
- 1996: Unpredictable Nature of the River – Jean-François de La Plaine
- 1996: Ridicule (directed by Patrice Leconte) – Abbé de Vilecourt
- 1997: Marianna Ucrìa – Grass
- 1997: Marquise (directed by Véra Belmont) – Molière
- 1997: Marthe (directed by Jean-Loup Hubert) – The Colonel
- 1998: TGV (directed by Moussa Touré) – Roger
- 1998: Le Double de ma moitié (directed by Yves Amoureux) – Thierry Montino
- 1999: Une affaire de goût (directed by Bernard Rapp) – Frédéric Delamont
- 2000: Gouttes d'eau sur pierres brûlantes (directed by François Ozon) – Léopold
- 2003: That Day – Pointpoirot
- 2003: La Petite Lili (directed by Claude Miller) – Brice
- 2003: Les marins perdus – Diamantis
- 2004: Je suis un assassin – Brice Kantor
- 2005: Chok-Dee – Jean

== Filmography as director ==
1988 – La Face de l'ogre (film TV)

1991 – L'Autre (film, 1991), d'après le roman d'Andrée Chedid

1992 – Un été glacé (film TV)

1996 – Unpredictable Nature of the River

=== Documentaries ===
1992- The travels of Bernard Giraudeau

1992- La Transamazonienne

1999- Un ami chilien

1999- Chili Norte – Chili Sure

2003 – Esquisses Philippines

== Bibliography ==
- 1992: Transamazonienne, Editions Odyssée, photos Pierre-Jean Rey ISBN 2-909478-01-7
- 1996: Les Caprices d'un fleuve, Editions Mille et Une Nuits, ISBN 978-2-84205-055-9
- 2001: Le Marin à l'ancre, Editions Métailié ISBN 2-86424-389-X
- 2002: Les Contes d'Humahuaca, Editions Métailié / Seuil jeunesse ISBN 2-02-056736-9
- 2003: Ailleurs, commentaire sur les peintures d'Olivier Suire Verley, Editions PC ISBN 2-912683-25-4
- 2004: Les Hommes à terre, Editions Métailié ISBN 2-86424-582-5
- 2007: Les Dames de nage, Editions Métailié ISBN 2-86424-614-7
- 2007: "Le Retour du quartier-maître", in Nos mers et nos océans, collective work of Les Écrivains de marine, Éditions des Équateurs, pp. 75–106
