= Jean Freustié =

French writer and literary critic

Jean Freustié, also known as Jean-Pierre Teurlay (3 October 1914 – 5 June 1983), was a French writer and literary critic. He won the 1969 Prix du roman de la société des gens de lettres, and 1970 Prix Renaudot, for Isabelle ou l'arrière-saison.

== Biography ==
Freustié was raised in a wealthy family whose father was a wine merchant. After his secondary education at the Institution of Montesquieu Libourne, he studied medicine at the Faculty of Medicine of Bordeaux and then in Algiers. He interned at the Hospital of Bordeaux in 1936, then he moved to Paris where he became a medical officer in 1950.

He attended the café Le Procope, with Jacques Brenner and Claude Perdriel, and their literary magazine, Le Cahier des saisons. He knew Françoise Sagan, Bernard Frank, Jean-Louis Curtis and Francis Nourissier, and met with great writers like Jacques Chardonne, Paul Morand, Jean Cocteau and Eugène Ionesco.

Freustié wrote for the France Observateur as a literary critic beginning in 1961. Retaining his position as literary critic for the Nouvel Observateur in 1964, he was also literary adviser to Denoël.

The Prix Jean-Freustié is awarded annually. His papers are held at l'Institut Mémoires de l'édition contemporaine.

== Works ==
- Ne délivrer que sur ordonnance (Do to prescription), éditions de la Table ronde, 1952; Gallimard, 1974
- Marthe ou les Amants tristes 1958; Table ronde, 1978
- Les Filles La Table ronde, 1959
- Un autre été La Table ronde, 1961
- La Passerelle (The Bridge), Grasset, 1963, Roger Nimier Prize
- Les Collines de l’Est B. Grasset, 1967. short stories
- Isabelle ou l'arrière-saison La Table ronde, 1970; W. H. Allen, 1972, ISBN 978-0-491-00622-4; La Table Ronde, 1980, ISBN 978-2-07-036368-1
- L'héritage du vent (Legacy of the Wind), Stock, 1979; Gallimard, 1983, ISBN 978-2-07-037496-0
- L'entracte algérien (Algerian Intermission), Balland, 1982; Paris-Méditerranée, 2001, ISBN 978-2-84272-105-3

== Sources ==
- Salim Jay, Jean Freustié, romancier de la sincérité, Editions du Rocher, 1998, ISBN 978-2-268-02799-9
