= A Monkey in Winter (novel) =

1959 novel by Antoine Blondin

- French language title page for Un singe en hiver (1959)
- Author: Antoine Blondin
- Translator: Robert Baldick
- Language: French
- Publisher: Éditions de la Table ronde
- Publication date: 1959
- Publication place: France
- English publication date: 1960
- Pages: 274

A Monkey in Winter (French: Un singe en hiver [œ̃ sɛ̃ʒ ɑ̃.n‿ivɛʁ]) is a 1959 novel by the French writer Antoine Blondin. It tells the story of a reformed alcohol addict who runs a small hotel in Normandy and has promised his wife to never drink alcohol again. To support a guest, a man who is nervous because he is to meet his daughter for the first time, he tells war stories and begins to drink to infuse courage. An English translation by Robert Baldick was published in 1960.

The book received the 1959 Prix Interallié. It was the basis for the 1962 film A Monkey in Winter, starring Jean Gabin and Jean-Paul Belmondo.

== See also ==
- 1959 in literature
- French literature
