= Moussa Touré =

Senegalese filmmaker

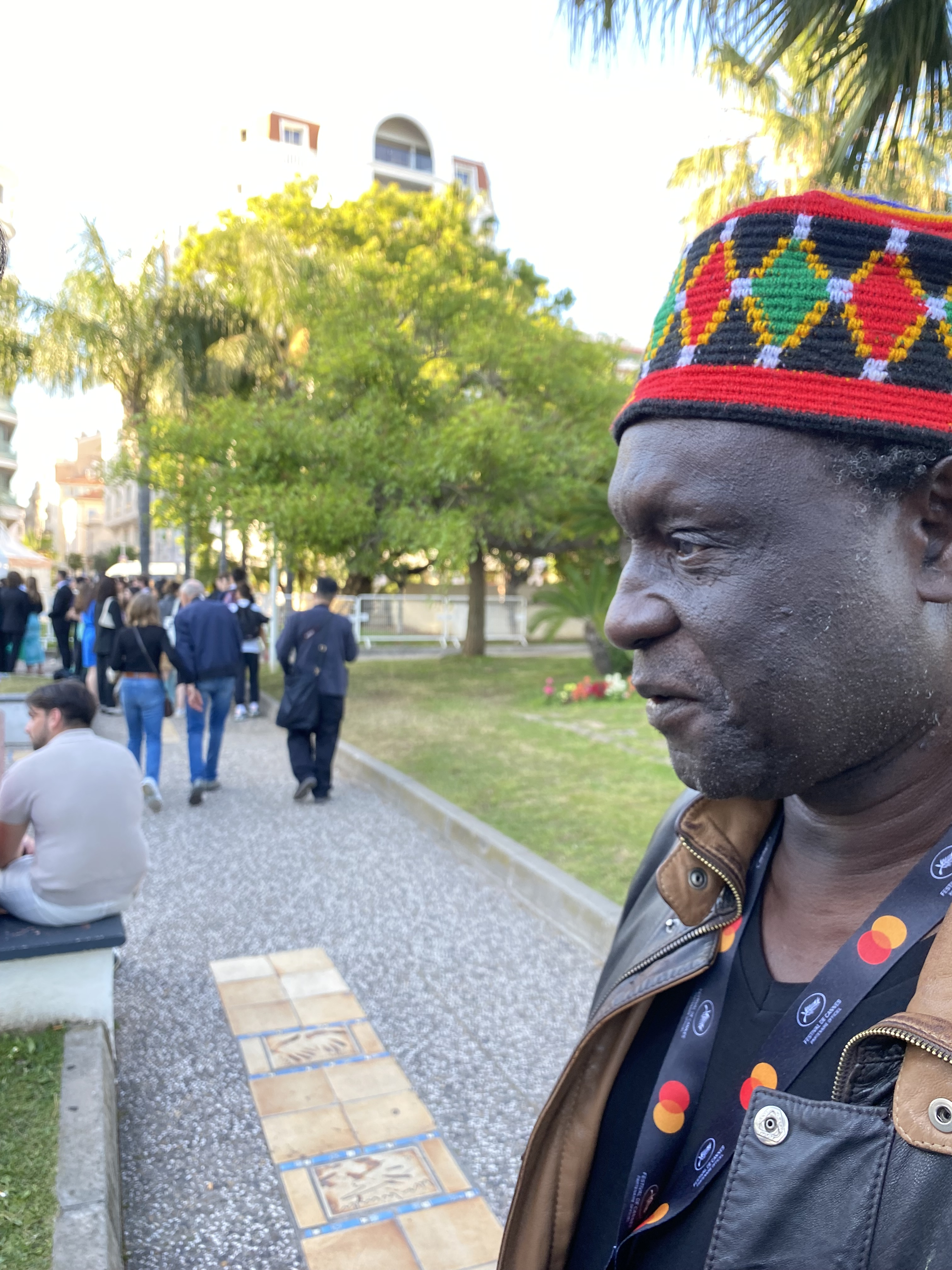
- Born: Moussa Touré; 1958 (age 67–68); Dakar, Sénégal
- Occupations: Director, technician, writer, producer, actor
- Years active: 1985–present

Moussa Touré (born 1958), is a Sénégalese filmmaker. He is best known as the director of critically acclaimed films Toubab Bi, TGV and La Pirogue. Apart from direction, he is also a technician, writer, producer and actor.

== Personal life ==
Touré was born in 1958 in Dakar, Senegal.

== Career ==
He started cinema career as technician. Then in 1987, he turned to direction with a short film and founded his own production firm called 'Les Films du Crocodile'. In 1991, Touré made his maiden feature film Toubab Bi. The film received critical acclaim and awarded at several international film festivals including 'Un Certain Regard section' of Cannes Film Festival. After the success of first feature, he made his second film TGV in 1998 with the support by Makéna Diop. Later in 1999, the film won the Audience Award at the 9th Africa International Film Festival.

In 1996, he made a supporting role in the film Les Caprices d'un rivière directed by Bernard Giraudeau. In 2005, he made a documentary 5x5 which gained critical reception. In 2011, Touré was appointed as the Head of the Jury panel in 2011 Panafrican Film and Television Festival of Ouagadougou (FESPACO). Then in 2012, he directed his third feature film La Pirogue, particularly a semi-documentary movie. The film was filmed and edited with the efficiency of a Hollywood blockbuster.

In 2020, he directed the film Red Dust which is produced by Luxembourgish outfit a BAHN and Dakar-based Touré's production house 'Les Films du Crocodile'. The film will be released in 2022.

== Filmography ==
Year	Film	Role	Genre	Ref.
1985	Histoire oubliée, soldats noirs	Technician	Film	
1987	Baram	Director	Short film	
1991	Toubab Bi	Director, screenplay	Film	
1992	Les Tirailleurs sénégalais	Director	Film	
1996	Unpredictable Nature of the River	Actor: Hannibal	Film	
1998	TGV	Director, writer, producer	Film	
2003	Nous sommes nombreuses	Director	Film	
2004	Poussières de ville	Director	Film	
2005	5x5	Director, writer	Documentary	
2005	Nanga def	Director	Film	
2005	Nawaari	Director	Film	
2006	Nosaltres	Director	Film	
2009	Les Techniciens, nos cousins	Director	Film	
2009	Xali Beut les yeux grand ouverts	Director	Film	
2012	La Pirogue	Director	Film	
2016	Bois d' Ébène	Director	TV movie documentary	
TBD	Red Dust	Director	Film	
