= Julian Evans (writer) =

Australian writer and presenter

Julian Evans is a British-Australian writer.

In 1990 he left his office job to become a writer and spent six months travelling among the islands of the south Pacific Ocean. In 1992 he published Transit of Venus: Travels in the Pacific. This launched him on a career as a writer of books, travel articles, essays, and radio and television documentaries on literary subjects. In 2008 he published Semi-Invisible Man: the Life of Norman Lewis; Evans wrote about writer and adventurer Norman Lewis after Lewis described Evans's Transit of Venus as "far and away the best book about the Pacific of our times." His most recent book is Undefeatable: Odesa in Love and War (2024), a personal history of his involvement with the city over 30 years. He is also a reviewer for a number of newspapers and magazines, including the Guardian, Daily Telegraph, Times Literary Supplement and Prospect.

== Works ==
- Undefeatable: Odesa in Love and War (Scotland Street Press, December 2024; updated edition, April 2026)
- Semi-Invisible Man: the Life of Norman Lewis (Jonathan Cape, June 2008, Picador June 2009)
- I sotteranei del Vaticano: rereading André Gide’s Les Caves du Vatican (Metauro Edizioni, Pesaro 2006)
- "Remettez-moi ça" ("Really very fortunate"), La Revue Littéraire vol.1 no.1, April 2004
- "Un gâchis" ("A waste"), L'Atelier du Roman no. 29, March 2002
- José Saramago: A Life of Resistance (BBC Four film), 2002
- The Romantic Road (BBC Radio 3 20-part radio series), 2000-2
- Transit of Venus: Travels in the Pacific (Secker & Warburg 1992, Pantheon 1992 (US); revised edition Eland Books 2014)
