= Roger Nimier =

French novelist (1925–1962)

Roger Nimier (31 October 1925 – 28 September 1962) was a French novelist.

== Life ==
Nimier was born in Paris, and served in the French Army, specifically in the 2nd Hussard Regiment in the Second World War (until 1945). He began to write quite early in his life. His first novel, Les Épées (The Swords) was published in 1948, when he was only 23.

Nimier was the recognized leader of the Hussards, a literary group which included notably Antoine Blondin, Michel Déon and Jacques Laurent, opposed to existentialism. He was opposed to the figure of the "engaged writer" symbolized by Jean-Paul Sartre.

Nimier most famous work is considered to be The Blue Hussar published in 1950. Nimier also wrote in monarchist review La Nation française. He also worked with director Louis Malle on the screenplay for Malle's 1958 film Ascenseur pour l'échafaud.

The Roger Nimier Prize was established in 1963 and goes to "a young author whose spirit is in line with the literary works of Roger Nimier".

== Published works ==
- Les Épées (1948)
- Perfide (1950)
- The Blue Hussar (Le hussard bleu) (1950)
- Les Enfants tristes (1951)
- Nothing to Make a Fuss About (Histoire d'un amour) (1953)
- D'Artagnan amoureux (1962)
- L' Etrangere (1968)

== See also ==
- Hussards (literary movement)
