= Antoine Blondin =

French writer (1922–1991)

- Blondin c. 1980s
- Born: 11 April 1922; Paris, France
- Died: 7 June 1991 (aged 69); Paris, France
- Occupations: Short story writer, novelist
- Writing career
- Pen name: Tenorio
- Notable awards: Prix des Deux Magots (1949), Prix Interallié (1959), Prix Henri Desgrange de l'Académie des sports (1972)
- Movement: Hussards

Antoine Blondin (French pronunciation: [ɑ̃twan blɔ̃dɛ̃]; 11 April 1922 – 7 June 1991) was a French writer.

He belonged to the literary group called the Hussards. He was also a sports columnist in L'Équipe. Blondin also wrote under the name Tenorio.

== Biography ==
Blondin was the son of a poet, Germaine Blondin, whose name he took, and of a printer's proof-reader. He earned a degree in philosophy the Sorbonne after studying at the Lycée Louis-le-Grand in Paris and the Lycée Pierre Corneille in Rouen. He became very close to Roland Laudenbach during World War II. He was sent to Germany in 1942 for compulsory war work during the German occupation of World War II. The experience inspired his first novel, L'Europe buissonnière, which appeared in 1949. It won the Prix des Deux Magots, named after a literary café in Paris, and brought him the friendship of authors such as Marcel Aymé and Roger Nimier and the philosopher, Jean-Paul Sartre. In 1953, the young critic Bernard Frank dubbed the novelists Roger Nimier, Jacques Laurent, and Blondin as "les Hussards," a title which stuck. The Hussards were characterized by their shared right-wing literary heritage, youthful irreverence towards leftist intellectuals, and a commitment to "art for art's sake." Blondin's right-wing leanings did not, however, prevent a friendship with the socialist François Mitterrand, for whom he later came to vote.

His next novels, Les Enfants du bon Dieu and L'Humeur vagabonde confirmed a distinctive style which critics placed between Stendhal and Jules Renard. Turns of phrase such as "After the second world war, the trains started moving again. I profited from that by leaving my wife and children" and "I have stayed very thin, and so has my body of work," are exemplary of Blondin's affinity for wordplay and humor. The themes of friendship, bohemianism, and the historical shock of World War II also held a prominent place in his fiction. After publishing the well-received novel Un Singe en hiver, Blondin remained an active journalist, but the death of his best friend Roger Nimier prompted him to largely abandon writing fiction for over a decade. Nonetheless, he won the 1977 Prix Goncourt de la Nouvelle for the short story collection Quat'saisons.

Blondin wrote press columns supporting the right in politics. He was a monarchist and wrote for monarchist publications such as Aspects de la France, La Nation Française and Rivarol. Although he was associated with Action Française intellectuals and the Maurrassian right during the beginning of his career, he distanced himself from politics later in his life. He also wrote sports features for L'Équipe, for which he covered 27 editions of the Tour de France and seven Olympic Games. The Tour de France winner, Bernard Hinault, said:

He never interviews anybody but just records his impressions of what he's seen and what he feels. Sometimes René Fallet was with him. They both love the Tour and, in simple language, they turn it into a modern epic, a troubador's song, a crusade, as they describe its beauty. The most banal event becomes significant to Blondin; he has only to see it and write about it. He raised the status of the Tour by giving it his own cachet; it became a myth to be renewed every year. No matter how predictable the race, he could maintain the interest in it.

Blondin was a bon vivant known for heavy drinking in the Parisian district of Saint-Germain-des-Prés, playing at bull-fighting with passing cars and racking up numerous arrests for drunkenness. He chronicled this aspect of his life in the autofictional novel, Monsieur Jadis ou L'École du Soir. He was frequently pursued for unpaid taxes. Pierre Chany said:

He really did owe a lot and, frankly, his situation was becoming serious; we even wondered if he wasn't going to prison. Faced with that, his friends called Maître Bertrand to the rescue. Bertrand managed to organise a summit meeting with the general inspector of taxes - the highest man in his profession, the equivalent of a minister. Full of good will, this man said:

"Alors, M. Blondin, I understand that you want to come to terms..."

"Let's come to terms!" Antoine said coldly.

"How much would you be able to put into your account?"

"A tear, monsieur..." Naturally, the man threw him out. It was poor Françoise who had to make another interview to sort it out.

A literary prize, for the best sports article, is awarded in his name.

== Bibliography ==
- 1949: L'Europe buissonnière, Paris, J. Froissart (prix des Deux Magots).
- 1952: Les Enfants du bon Dieu, Paris, la Table ronde.
- 1955: L'Humeur vagabonde, Paris, La Table ronde.
- 1959: Un singe en hiver, Paris, La Table ronde.
- 1960: Un garçon d'honneur, Paris, La Table Ronde (with Paul Guimard).
- 1965: La France que j'aime, Paris, Edition SUN (with Jacques Laurent and Kléber Haedens).
- 1970: Monsieur Jadis ou l'École du soir, Paris, La Table ronde.
- 1975: Quat'saisons, Paris, La Table ronde (prix Goncourt de la nouvelle).
- 1977: Certificats d'études, Paris, La Table ronde.
- 1979: Le Cœur net, Etam.
- 1982: Ma vie entre des lignes, Paris, La Table ronde.
- 1984: Le Tour de France en quatre et vingt jours, Paris, Denoël ISBN 2-207-23026-0.
- 1987: Paris 360 °, Grenoble, Glénat ISBN 2-7234-0735-7.
- 1988: L'Ironie du sport : chroniques de L'Équipe : 1954-1982, Paris, F. Bourin ISBN 2-87686-008-2.
- 1988: Le Flâneur de la rive gauche, Paris, F. Bourin ISBN 2-87686-022-8.
- 1988: Alcools de nuit, Paris, M. Lafon ISBN 2-86804-596-0.
- 1990: Devoirs de vacances : Baudelaire, Cocteau, Musset, Rimbaud et... Ulysse, Bruxelles-Paris, Complexe ISBN 2-87027-339-8.

=== Posthumous publications ===
- 1991: Œuvres, R. Laffont, coll. « Bouquins » ISBN 2-221-06981-1.
- 1991: O.K. Voltaire, Quai Voltaire, Paris.
- 1993: Mon journal, la Table ronde, Paris. ISBN 2-7103-0557-7.
- 1993: Un malin plaisir, la Table ronde, Paris. ISBN 2-7103-0558-5.
- 1999: La Semaine buissonnière, la Table ronde, Paris. ISBN 2-7103-0860-6.
- 2001: Tours de France : chroniques intégrales de L'Équipe, 1954-1982, la Table ronde, Paris. ISBN 2-7103-2423-7.
- 2004: Premières et dernières nouvelles, la Table ronde, Paris. ISBN 2-7103-2683-3.
- 2006: Mes petits papiers, la Table ronde, Paris. ISBN 2-7103-2858-5.
- 2011: L'Humeur vagabonde, with Un singe en hiver, La Table Ronde, Paris.

=== As Tenorio ===
- 1965: L'Adultérologie, Paris, Denoël.
