= Bernard Frank =

French journalist and writer (1929–2006)

- Born: 11 October 1929; Neuilly-sur-Seine, France
- Died: 3 November 2006 (aged 77); Paris, France
- Occupation: Writer

Bernard Frank (11 October 1929 – 3 November 2006) was a French journalist and writer.

== Early life ==
Bernard Frank was raised in a comfortable family, where his father was a bank manager. After his baccalauréat, he started a Khâgne at the Lycée Pasteur but was expelled for bad conduct. He tried again to complete his preparatory classes at the lycée Condorcet, but abandoned them out of boredom during the second trimester.

At the age of 20, Frank met Jean-Paul Sartre, who entrusted him on a trial basis with a column in his magazine, Les Temps Modernes. He remained a periodic contributor, but after publication of his novel Les Rats (1953), he fell out with the magazine's management.

== Career and journalism ==
During 1952–1953, Frank was in charge of the literary column in l'Observateur, as a substitute for Maurice Nadeau. He started his work on the weekly with a double page which he dedicated to Drieu la Rochelle. He then coined the label "Hussards", in a December 1952 article published in Les Temps modernes, to designate writers such as Roger Nimier and Antoine Blondin.

He also contributed to Le Monde, the Cahier des saisons, the Nouveau Candide, and L'Actualité. "Every autumn he disparaged the nominees for literary prizes, judging that too many bad novels are published, and mocked colleagues who found genius in the slightest nuance of the season; and just to push it, would double his ridicule just to wind them up."

At the end of 1961, Frank met the journalist Jean Daniel while hospitalised in a Neuilly clinic, where their mutual friend, the editor Claude Perdriel, thought "perhaps maliciously" to introduce them to one another. He again contributed to the Nouvel Observateur in the latter half of the 1960s.

== Awards ==
Frank won the Prix des Deux Magots in 1971 for "un Siècle débordé", and the Roger Nimier Prize in 1981 for "Solde". That year he began a literary column in the daily Le Matin de Paris before rejoining Le Monde in 1985 and then Le Nouvel Observateur in 1989.

== Death ==
Frank died of a heart attack 3 November 2006, while dining in a restaurant in the 8th Arrondissement of Paris. His wife said that he was discussing politics at the moment of his death.

== Works ==
- 1952 : Grognards et hussards
- 1953 : Géographie universelle
- 1953 : Les Rats
- 1955 : Israël
- 1955 : L'Illusion comique
- 1956 : Le Dernier des Mohicans
- 1958 : La Panoplie littéraire
- 1970 : Un Siècle débordé
- 1980 : Solde
- 2001(?) : Portraits et Aphorismes
