= Le Matin de Paris =

French newspaper

Le Matin de Paris (French pronunciation: [lə matɛ̃ də paʁi], The Morning of Paris) was a French daily newspaper, founded on 1 March 1977 by Claude Perdriel, and disappearing in 1987 ("dépôt de bilan" on 6 May). Its foundation is the subject of the documentary Numéros zéro by Raymond Depardon.

== History ==
=== The daily of the Nouvel Observateur ===
Founded in 1977 by the chief executive of Le Nouvel Observateur, Le Matin de Paris shared its director, capital, journalists and structures with Jean Daniel's weekly paper.

These links were at first capitalistic in nature in which, by the bias of the SA Le Nouvel Observateur du Monde (with 2 million Francs) or by that of its CEO Claude Perdriel (with 2.24 million Francs), the weekly and its director controlled 53% of its initial capital. Later, in February 1978, Le Nouvel Observateur put 1,750,000 francs at Le Matin's disposal, constituting new financial assistance opposed by the personnel of Le Nouvel Observateur.

This financial support was brought about on the daily newspaper's board of directors by a very strong presence of those responsible for Le Nouvel Observateur. Thus, alongside his general administrator Bernard Villeneuve, "faithful right-arm of Claude Perdriel" in charge of the Observateur's promotion and sales, are presently Gilles Martinet (co-founder of the Observateur), Philippe Viannay (Observateur's editorial advisor) and, until his death in May 1979, Jacques Deshayes (technical advisor and member of the committee of direction of Observateur). This presence reinforced itself in April 1981 with the addition of Jean Daniel (editorial director of the Observateur) and of Roger Priouret (editorial writer to RTL and to Observateur), with only Roger Colombani (chief editor, assisting with the morning edition of France Soir) not historically linked to the newspaper of the rue d'Aboukir.

== Figures on Le Matin de Paris ==
- Barrigue, illustrator (19??)
- Patrice Burnat
- Hervé Chabalier
- Guy Claisse
- Maurice Clavel, columnist (1977–1979)
- Bernard Frank, columnist (1981–1985)
- Jean-Edern Hallier (1983)
- Jean-François Kahn, chief-editor (1983-198?)
- Boris Kidel, editor
- Bernard Langlois, editorial writer (1977–1981)
- François-Henri de Virieu
- Max Gallo
- François Hollande
- Alexandre Adler
- Benoît Rayski
- Christine Bravo
- Françoise Xenakis
- Henri Quiqueré, editor

== Circulation figures ==
- 1977 : 104,743
- 1981 : 178,847
- 1986 : 91,517
