= Les Grosses Têtes =

- Genre: Comedy
- Running time: Weekdays: 15:30-18:00
- Country of origin: France
- Language: French
- Home station: RTL
- Hosted by: Laurent Ruquier (2014–present); Philippe Bouvard (1977-2014); Christophe Dechavanne (2000)
- Created by: Jean Farran and Roger Krecher
- Original release: April 1, 1977; 49 years ago
- Website: www.rtl.fr/emission/les-grosses-tetes/

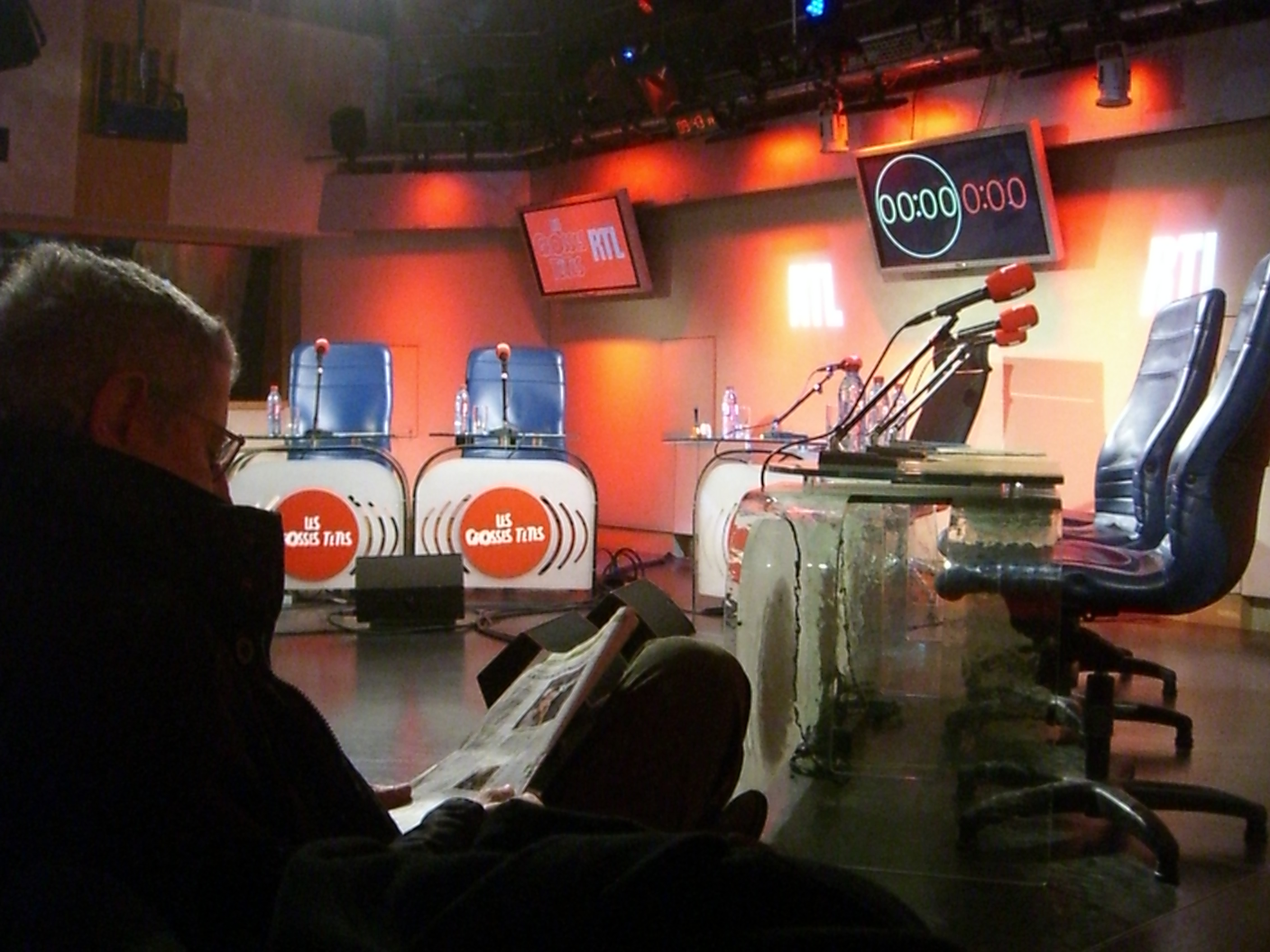
Radio studio

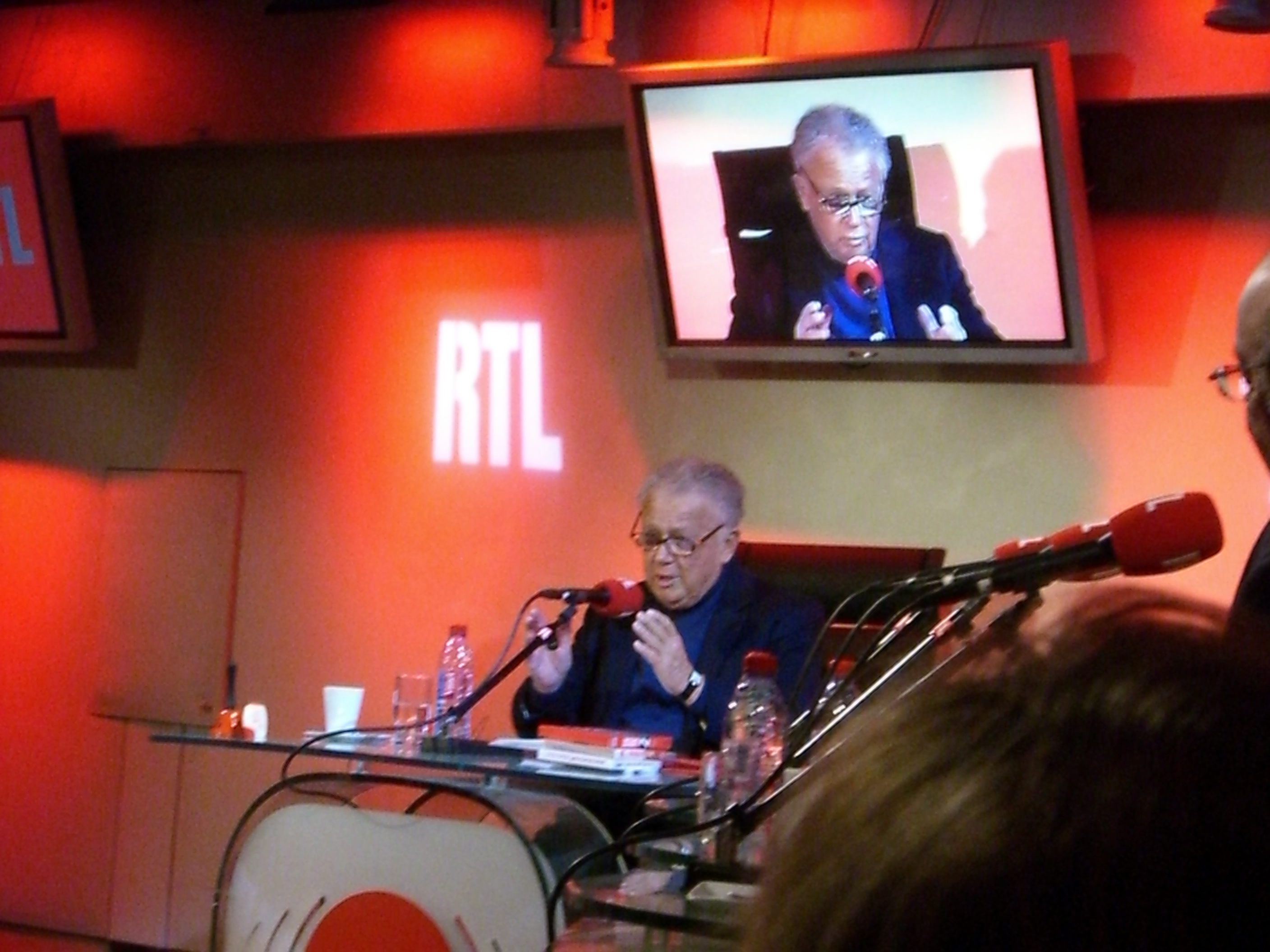
Former presenter Philippe Bouvard

Les Grosses Têtes (French pronunciation: [le ɡʁos tɛt];"The Big Heads" or "The Big Brains" in English) is a daily comedy radio programme on the French language RTL radio network. Broadcast since 1 April 1977, the current host since 2014 has been Laurent Ruquier.

Presently broadcast from 15:30 to 18:00 in France and Belgium (on Bel RTL) this show has several regular segments. The first quarter of the show is hard-hitting news and the next quarter deals with cultural issues. Then, for the next 30 minutes the host takes phone calls from listeners. Finally, guests are interviewed and joked about (these jokes are called gauloises on the show). Part of the format is when guests are asked questions sent in by the listeners, the most famous being Mme Leprieur.

== History ==
In 2000, station managers thought that they could do without the services of their aging top host (animateur de référence) and replaced him with Christophe Dechavanne. The rapid loss of listeners showed that the program's success was due as much to the audience's attachment to the hosts as to its formula, which led to the return of Philippe Bouvard as host and producer of the show the following season. Since then, the show has been hosted by Laurent Ruquier.

== On television ==
A TV version aired in 1985 on Antenne 2 to celebrate its 2500th show, followed by another in 1992 for the 5000th show on TF1. A regular TV version aired on TF1 from 1992 to 1997 on Saturday evenings, with the same principles as the radio show. It attracted 11.2 million viewers.

Les Grosses Tetes has had many more special TV shows since then on France 2.

== Reception and criticism ==
Les Grosses Tetes is the most popular show on RTL. Nevertheless it has been criticised for its crude humour with elements of racism, sexism and homophobia.

On 27 March 1996, Philippe Bouvard, Vincent Perrot, and the president of TF1 Patrick Le Lay were fined for having provoked racial hatred by telling a riddle comparing Muslim women to robbers.

The Association of LGBT Journalists investigated the show in 2020, noting homophobic and sexist humour as well as jokes about Romanians and Roma being thieves, and Asian people being responsible for the COVID-19 pandemic.

The accusations were considered baseless by Laurent Ruquier, the host, who is openly gay as well as various "sociétaires", daily participants, many of whom are gay, women and from ethnic minorities.

== Notable past members ==
- Léon Zitrone
- Carlos
- Olivier de Kersauson
- Jackie Sardou
- Jean-Pierre Foucault
- Jean Dutourd
- Alice Sapritch
- Michel Galabru
- Jacques Martin
- Jean-Claude Brialy
- Jean Yanne
- Sim
- Thierry Roland
- Pierre Bellemare
- Philippe Chevallier
- Amanda Lear
- Macha Méril
- Liane Foly

== Current members of the panel ==
- Jacques Balutin (since 1977)
- Jacques Mailhot (1983, since 1997)
- Bernard Mabille (1985 / 1991-1992, since 2001)
- Chantal Ladesou (since 2010)
- Jean-Jacques Peroni (since 1998)
- Laurent Baffie (1992-1993 / 1998-1999, since 2013)
- Isabelle Alonso (1996-2000, since 2014)
- Pierre Bénichou (1999-2000, 2014-2020)
- Michèle Bernier (1984, since 2014)
- Jean-Pierre Coffe (1986-2010, 2014-2016)
- Christophe Dechavanne (2000, since 2015)
- Arielle Dombasle (since January 2016)
- Michel Drucker (since 2014)
- Danièle Évenou (since 2014)
- Fabrice (2001-2002, since 2014)
- Sophie Garel (1982, since 2014)
- Marie Laforêt (1990, since 2014)
- Isabelle Mergault (1988-2000, since 2014)
- Claude Sarraute (1984-1995, since 2014)
- Roger Zabel (80') (since 2014)
- Thierry Ardisson (since 2014)
- Guy Carlier (since 2014)
- Caroline Diament (since 2014)
- Fabrice Eboué (since 2014)
- Florian Gazan (since 2014)
- Philippe Geluck (since 2014)
- Franz-Olivier Giesbert (since 2014)
- Marcela Iacub (since 2014)
- Amanda Sthers (since 2014)
- Titoff (since 2014)
- Christophe Beaugrand (since 2014)
- Steevy Boulay (since 2014)
- Christine Bravo (since 2014)
- François-Henri Désérable (since 2014)
- Yann Moix (since 2014)
- Cristiana Reali (since 2014)
- Paul Wermus (since 2014)
- Baptiste Lecaplain (since 2014)
- Arnaud Ducret (since 2014)
- Karine Lemarchand (since 2014)
- Bérengère Krief (since 2014)
- Jean-Luc Moreau (since 2014)
- Christine Ockrent (since 2015)
- Mustapha El Atrassi (since 2015)
- Norbert Tarayre (since 2015)
- Éric Thomas (since 2015)
- Gérard Louvin (since 2015)
