= Historia (newspaper) =

French language history magazine

Historia is a French monthly magazine devoted to History topics.

== History ==
Historia was created by Jules Tallandier, a former bookseller who became an editor. In 1908 start the Lisez-moi magazine, composed with adventure stories. In December 1908 Historia is created as an historical counterpart to Lisez-moi. The magazine ceased to be released from 1937 to 1945.

The magazine is restarted in 1946 by Maurice Dumoncel, grandson of Jules Tallandier. In 1955, the magazine takes its current title.

In 1999, the Le Point group buys the Tallandier edition, including the Historia magazine. The Tallandier editions are then fragmented, and Historia becomes a part of the Sophia Publications group. Sophia Publications is sold in 2014 to Maurice Szafran, former president of Marianne.

In June 2016, Sophia Publications was sold to the Claude Perdriel, historic owner of the press group Challenges. In December 2017, the French carmaker Renault announced its intention to buy 40% of the Challenges group, which controls Historia's editor Sophia Publications, in a move to push partly-owned news content to its system of connected cars. In October 2020, the French businessman Bernard Arnault announced its intention to invest in the press group Challenges, also owned by Claude Perdriel, a plan which implies moving the newspapers Historia and L'Histoire out of Sophia Publications to join the umbrella of the Challenges group.
