= Laurent Baffie =

French author, short film director and humorist

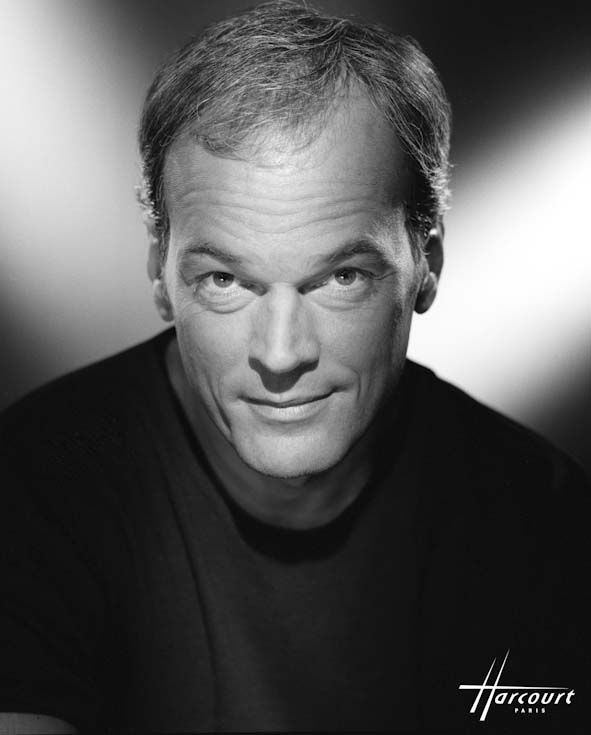
- Born: 18 April 1958 (age 68); Montreuil, France
- Occupations: Author, humorist

Laurent Baffie (French: [loʁɑ̃ bafi]; born 18 April 1958 in Montreuil) is a French author, short film director and humorist.

Baffie (often only called by his last name) is famous for his funny hidden cameras, sens of repartee, biting humour as well as musical and animal culture.

== Theater ==
His 2005 play TOC TOC (which alludes to OCD) was translated into Spanish by Julián Quintanilla in 2010 and has been a box office hit in Spain, where it has been on stage for eight seasons and more than 1500 shows, in Argentina where it ran for nine years and was viewed by more than 1.7 million people, and in Mexico where more than 1000 shows were performed.

== Biography ==
=== Childhood and the beginning of his career ===
Son of a battered wife, Laurent Baffie gave up school in Year 9 ("classe de 4ème"), to start an accountant training before moving to theatre. He started earning money as an extra in the variety shows of Maritie and Gilbert Carpentier.

=== Skits writer ===
From 1985, he wrote skits, notably for Jean-Marie Bigard in the show La Classe on France 3. Since then, he has always participated in the writing the shows of his friend.

=== Work on the radio ===
In 1990, he created and presented the show Vas-y, fais-nous rire on Fun Radio. He also took part of Philippe Bouvard's show, Les Grosses Têtes. In 1993, he presented a show called Ze Baffie Show on Skyrock, with the help of one of his friends back then, Jarlot. In 1999, he created C'est quoi ce bordel on Europe 2.

From 9 September 2007 until 3 July 2011, he again worked as a radio presenter, this time on Europe 1. The show, which was broadcast every Sunday between 11 and noon, reused some concepts from C'est quoi ce bordel ?. Its title changed every week during the first years (Coloscopie, Demain, c'est mardi, C'était mieux dimanche dernier, Papy fait de la résistance, Vous êtes bien sur RTL, Julie, droguée, prostituée et fière de l'être, Baffie est un sale con, Taisez-vous Elkabbach, Ma vieille chatte perd ses poils, etc.) before changing to its final name C'est quoi ce bordel. He was always with Julie from Europe 1. In his Sunday show, he used samples, on which Julie recorded sentences, using off the wall humour, as well as the famous sentence from Édouard Balladur "je vous demande de vous arrêter" (I ask you to stop). He also uses jingle samples of Europe 1 and other radios and adverts, which he uses for phone pranks. In June 2011, he announced he had been laid off, the radio station imputing it to economic reasons. His last show was broadcast on 3 July 2011. He was replaced by Marion Ruggieri with her show called Il n'y en a que pour elle.

Baffie came back on the radio on 25 September 2011 on Rire et Chansons where he restarted his show C'est quoi ce bordel ? which had already been on Europe 2, then Europe 1. On 14 January 2013, he announced he had been laid off from Rire et Chansons. In 2013, he joined Philippe Bouvard's team in the show Grosses Têtes. He stayed in this show even after Laurent Ruquier arrived in 2014.

== Participations ==
- 2014 : Cancer, business mortel ?, film documentary by Jean-Yves Bilien
