= Le Nouveau Magazine Littéraire =

French monthly literature magazine

- Editor: François Bott, Jean-Jacques Brochier (1968), Jean-Louis Hue (2003) Joseph Macé-Scaron (2007), Pierre Assouline et Hervé Aubron (2014), Raphaël Glucksmann and Nicolas Domenach (2018)
- Categories: Literature
- Frequency: Monthly
- Publisher: Guy Sitbon, Nicky et Jean-Claude Fasquelle (1970), Holding Artémis (years 2000), Claude Perdriel and Maurice Szafran (2014)
- First issue: 1966; 59 years ago
- Country: France
- Based in: Paris
- Website: lire.fr
- ISSN: 0024-9807

Le Nouveau Magazine Littéraire, formerly Le Magazine Littéraire, is a French monthly magazine about literature. It is published by Sophia Publications. The headquarters is in Paris. It is available in print as well as online on Cairn.info.

In 2014, it had a circulation of 20,300 copies. The February 2015 issue was edited by author Pierre Assouline. In October 2020, Claude Perdriel, owner of Sophia Publications, sold Le Nouveau Magazine Littéraire to Jean-Jacques Augier and Stéphane Chabenat.
