= Sophia Publications =

French magazine publishing house

- Industry: media
- Headquarters: Paris, France
- Area served: France
- Products: magazines
- Website: www.sophiapublications.fr

Sophia Publications is a French publisher of magazines.

== Scope ==
It publishes magazines such as Historia, L'Histoire, La Recherche, Le Magazine Littéraire, etc.

== Ownership ==
It was a subsidiary of Groupe Artémis, owned by François-Henri Pinault. In April 2014, it was sold to investors Maurice Szafran, Thierry Verret and Gilles Gramat. In Autumn 2014, Claude Perdriel acquired 50% for 750,000 Euros. In February 2015, it became insolvent, partly due to a lack of magazine consumers.
