= Fagzine =

LGBTQ magazine

- Categories: Gay subculture, counterculture, LGBT
- Founded: 1971

A fagzine (also known as queerzine or gay fanzine) is an independent publication, with a more or less regular issues, whose origin is found in the gay subculture. While most influential fagzines are published as print journals, others are edited electronically.

In their content and aesthetics, fagzines consciously differentiate themselves from the commercial magazines, seeking their inspiration from counterculture. Although the most fagzines are part of covert and underground culture movements, influential journalists and photographers have emerged from these magazines.

== History ==
Straight to Hell Magazine: The Manhattan Review of Unnatural Acts (S.T.H.), a counterculture magazine, was founded in 1971 by Boyd McDonald (1925–1993) based out of New York City. Considered the first fagzine, it drew attention for its simple design, pornographic aesthetics and radical political views. McDonald published the sexual experiences of his readers under various titles.

Other early fanzines included Folsom, which was published for a short period in 1980 by Jim Moss in San Francisco, and the Magazine, published from 1980 to 1987 by Didier Lestrade and Misti Gris in Paris. The graphic design and typography of the Parisian publication are considered precursors to many of the later fanzines. Photographers Pierre & Gilles and Walter Pfeiffer worked with the publication during their early years. Lestrade got famous artists such as Paul Morrissey, Edmund White, Tom of Finland, David Hockney, Keith Haring, and Paul Bowles, to conduct works or interviews for the magazine.

With the development of cheaper copying and offset techniques, several punk-oriented fagzines were published in the late 1980s. Amongst them was J.D.s. of Toronto, which came out between 1985 and 1991, and was edited, among others, by Bruce LaBruce, the pioneer of Queercore movement.

With the emergence of the Internet, few of them became digital magazines. However, most fagzines are still edited on paper. The content of most fagzines is characterized by sexually explicit contributions, and artistic aspirations.

The Queerzine Archive Project, established in 2003, has collected and digitized new and old publications. In 2006, the Taschen publishing house published a collection of photographs and texts of the fagzine Butt. In 2008, the first general monograph on the development of the fagzines was published. In 2010 the Parisian gallery 12Mail dedicated an exclusive exhibition to the fanzine Magazine.
