= Media library of the Musée du Quai Branly =

Library and archive in Paris, France

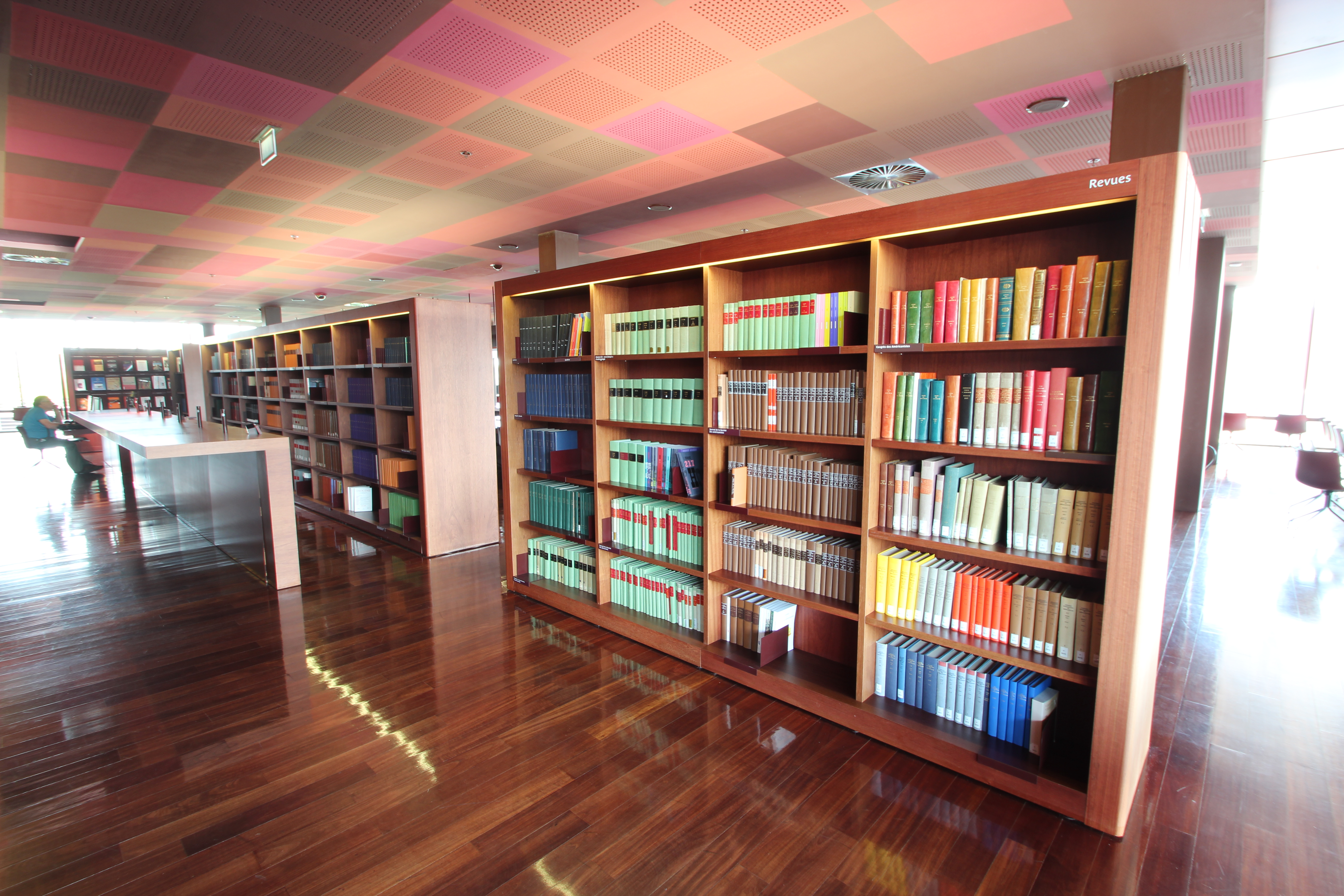
- Scientific library on the 5th floor
- Location: 37 Quai Branly, 75007 Paris, France, Paris
- Type: Library of the Quai Branly museum in Paris, France
- Established: 2006
- Architect: Jean Nouvel

Collection
- Specialization: Anthropology, non-Western art
- Items collected: more than 900,000 objects

Other information
- Director: Ghislain Dibie
- Website: Official website of library

The media library of the Musée du quai Branly is a specialized research and public documentation centre, situated within the Musée du quai Branly – Jacques Chirac (MQB), an ethnographic and art museum in Paris, France. It is a cultural and scholarly resource centre focused on the arts, civilizations, ethnology and anthropology of Africa, the Americas, Asia and Oceania.

At the museum's foundation in 2006, its collection of media incorporated the libraries of two former French ethnographic museums. Overall, the media library functions both as an academic research facility and a public cultural institution, contributing to the interpretation, conservation, and dissemination of knowledge about non-European cultures and artistic traditions. The collections encompass hundreds of thousands of books and periodicals, audiovisual media, photographic archives and digital databases, reflecting the breadth of the museum’s collection.

== Origins of the collections ==
The media library of the MQB evolved from the heritage collections of the former Musée de l’Homme and the Musée national des Arts d’Afrique et d’Océanie in Paris, integrating monographs, periodicals, visual archives, photographs, sound recordings and electronic documents into a unified repository. Its holdings support research and interpretation of the museum’s object collections and related fields of study.

== Present collections ==
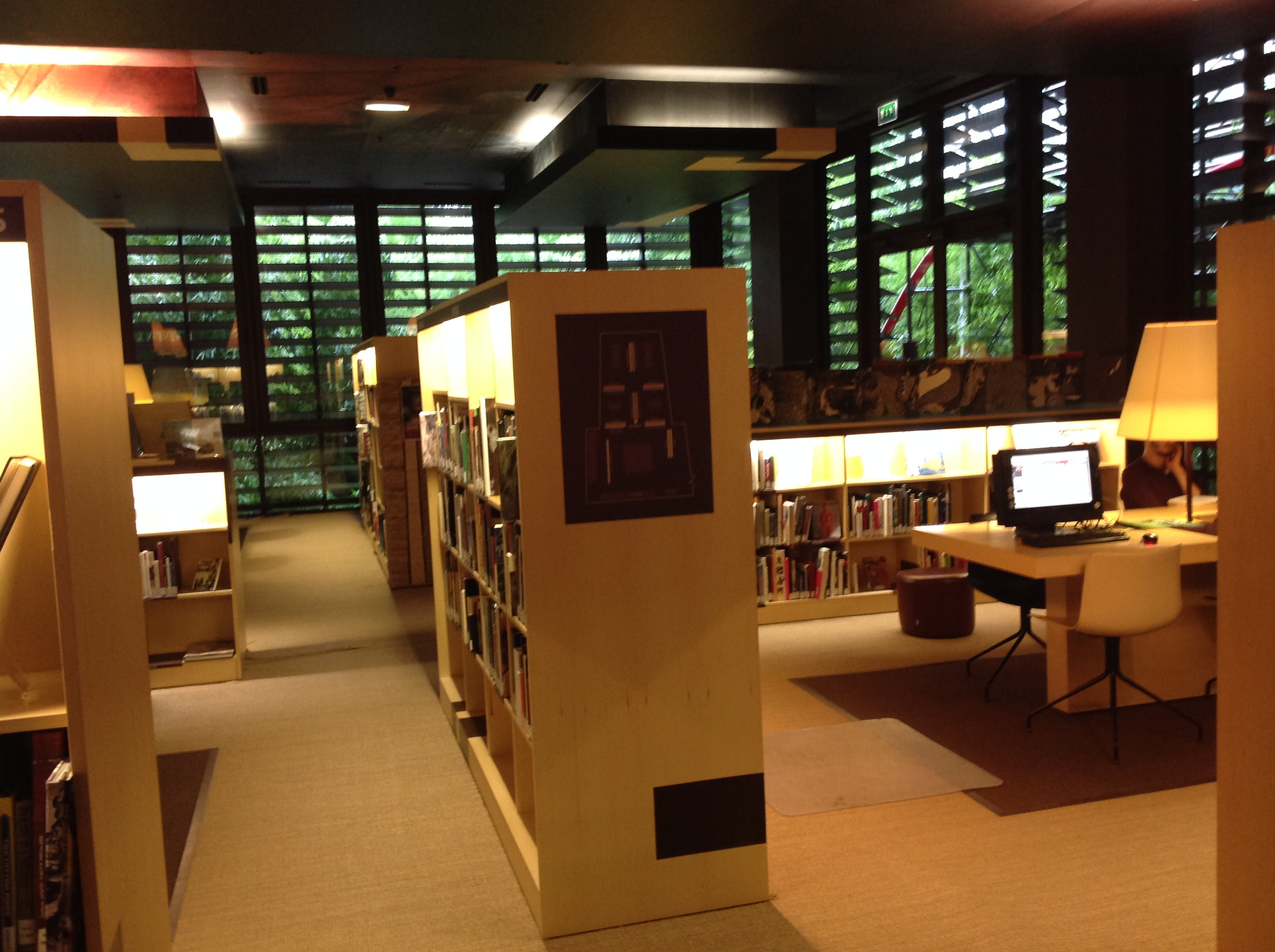
The Jacques Kerchache reading room on the ground floor

Situated in separate areas of the building conceived by French architect Jean Nouvel, access to the media library is free, with some of the reading and consultation spaces available to registered visitors and researchers. It is organised into multiple specialised areas that include a research library, the Jacques Kerchache reading room, archives and documentation collections, and a department for rare or precious materials. In addition to on-site resources and free wireless access to the Internet, the media library offers access to extensive online catalogues and digital platforms for scholarly materials, enhancing the availability of its collections to a broader audience worldwide.

As of 2026, the collection of print documents encompassed approx. 280,000 monographs, with 18,000 titles in open access. This includes 11,000 rare and valuable documents from the end of the 16th to the 19th century: accounts of voyages, scientific missions, original and annotated editions, etc. Further, 6000 periodicals, including 400 current subscriptions of art magazines and scientific journals in the humanities and social sciences.

Theses in ethnology and anthropology defended in France since 1985, including those at the Ecole des Hautes Etudes en Sciences Sociales (EHESS) are part of the collection, plus a collection of 3,000 non-European comic strips. All media combined, more than 100,000 of these have been digitized for online access.

=== Incorporation of private collections ===
In 2007, 2,300 works from the Jacques Kerchache collection of "arts premiers" (tribal arts) were incorporated. In 2010, the personal library of French anthropologist Claude Lévi-Strauss of 6,500 works was donated to the library. Other works originate from private libraries of French sociologist Marcel Mauss and anthropologist Georges Condominas.

=== Visual, sound and audiovisual documents ===
These collections encompass approx. 700.000 images, films, sound recordings and electronic documents. Mainly made up of photographs, the collection is complemented by groups of posters, postcards, prints, and drawings. It reflects a wide range of processes in terms of both technique and the history of photography: daguerreotypes (a group of 176 unique items), paper prints from all periods, paper negatives, glass negatives in collodion and gelatin silver, film negatives, transparencies on film and glass, Ektachromes, albums, and a small number of rare cameras. Around 238,000 items have been inventoried and 220,000 digitized. All of this work continues alongside ongoing legal research.

For several years, the Musée du Quai Branly has undertaken numerous acquisitions, particularly in the field of photography, covering both the nineteenth and the twentieth centuries. These include nineteenth-century expeditions in Oceania (Festetics de Tolna), work produced in Russia (albums by Baron Berthelot de Baye), and collections assembled by ethnologists such as Guérin-Faublée relating to the 1936 mission to the Aurès conducted by Thérèse Rivière and Germaine Tillion, as well as holdings connected with Françoise Girard and Christine Quersin. The iconographic collections have also expanded to include contemporary creation. In addition to organizing photography exhibitions, the museum has staged the Photoquai biennial since 2007.

== See also ==
- List of libraries in France
