= Vincent Perrot =

French journalist and broadcaster

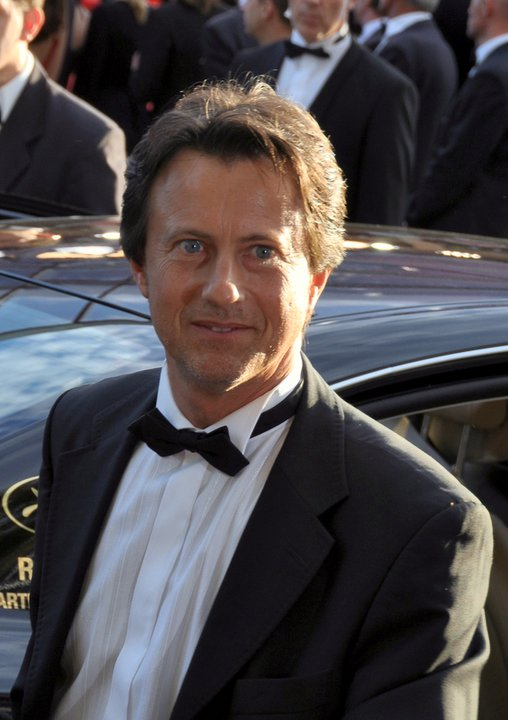
- Vincent Perrot at the 2011 Cannes Film Festival
- Born: 3 August 1965 (age 60); Confolens, Charente, France
- Occupations: Television presenter, radio presenter, drag racing driver
- Years active: 1982–present

Vincent Perrot (born 3 August 1965 in Confolens) is a French journalist, radio and television presenter and drag racing driver.

== Biography ==
Perrot's father was the Mayor of the town and died when Vincent was 11. His mother Marina decided to move the family to Limoges. As a child, Vincent Perrot used to listen to the radio France Bleu Limousin, in which a program about the cinema was broadcast. He wrote every week to the presenter to tell him that he did not agree with his point of view on the films he introduced. The presenter later invited him at his program and it was his beginning of his career at 17 on channel FR3.

== Career ==
Perrot started being well known in the late 1980s when he replaced Jean Rochefort who presented Disney Channel on FR3 and then hosting summer afternoons the program 40° à l'ombre on the same channel. During the rest of the year, he presented a number of programs including On va gagner, Vincent à l'heure and Zapper n'est pas jouer. In 1989, still on FR3, he co-hosts the teenager program C'est pas juste.

During summer 1997, Perrot joined TF1 and presents the game show Mokshû Patamû, which had a moderate success. After that, it took him a few years to find again his success on television. He then presented in 2001 L'été des records on the same channel and Un contre tous (French version of the Belgian game show Septante et un) on France 3.

Perrot is one of the most famous radio presenters on RTL, in which he presents Vendredi c'est VIP and Le Cékoidon. He is also one of the most famous guests of the program Les Grosses Têtes hosted by Philippe Bouvard.

In 1998, Perrot became the fastest in the world accelerating with a speed of 402.8 km/h (251.8 mph) with a dragster. In September 2006, he made another record of 530.7 km/h (331.6 mph) in a stopped start. He is the founder of the Perrot Feeler Racing, dedicated to different categories of dragsters. He produces and presents in June 2009 the program Vincent Limites on channel Motors TV.

Since summer 2010, with the agreement and the collaboration of Jean-Paul Belmondo, Perrot co-produces the first official documentary about the life and career of the actor. The program had an excellent distribution due to the exceptional participation of Alain Delon, Jean Dujardin, Vanessa Paradis, Albert Dupontel, Vincent Cassel, Jean Rochefort, Jean-Pierre Marielle, Claude Lelouch, Claudia Cardinale, and even Zinedine Zidane. This documentary was broadcast on primetime on France 2 on May 17, 2011, and in the official selection of the 2011 Cannes Film Festival.
