= Laurent & Lewis =

- Also known as: Laurent & Lewis
- Born: Laurent Chambon & Lewis de Janeiro; 22 May 1972 (age 53) & 1 June 1966 (age 59); Châtenay Malabry, France & Amsterdam, Netherlands
- Origin: Amsterdam, Netherlands (resp. France & United States, Brazil, Portugal)
- Genres: Pop, dance, electronica, urban contemporary
- Occupations: Singer-songwriter, musician, record producer, dj
- Instruments: vocals, keyboards, percussion
- Years active: 2002–present
- Label: Cherry Juice recordings
- Website: laurentetlewis.com

Laurent & Lewis is a musical duo composed of Laurent Chambon and Lewis de Janeiro. The first is French, the other is American-Portuguese. They live in The Netherlands.

Their music is a mix of Pop, House Music, Techno and ethnic music. They worked with different underground artists like the Butch Bitches (collective with Aaron-Carl, La Chocha and DJ Bærtran), the American artists Aaron-Carl Ragland (Detroit) and Snax (Berlin).

At the Amsterdam Dance Event 2007, during the Demolition 2007 contest, 'Motion' was voted best song by DJs Kevin Saunderson and Dave Clarke.

The official release of their first album, 'Überlove', was set in April–May 2008, even if copies circulated since March. It is already considered a masterpiece by some people (Didier Lestrade, Geneviève Gauckler...). Mixed in Amsterdam, in Paris, in Detroit et in Norway, it was mastered in Lappeenranta (Finland), the Mecca of Nordic and Russian Hard rock. The sleeve was created by Pierre Marly, the Reykjavik-based Graphic designer of French origin.

Laurent is also known DJ Laurent Outang and released records under the name of Tournedisk in collaboration with Fusée Dorée, Monsieur B. or Toomoo.

== Discography ==
- 'Monochrome' (in 'Fuwa Fuwa', Sweet Smelling Surfaces, France & Japon 2005)
- 'Motion' (avec Aaron-Carl, Cherry Juice Recordings, 12" vinyl, USA 2006)
- 'Just Want To Be Loved' (Cherry Juice Recordings, 12" vinyl, USA 2008)
- 'Überlove' (Cherry Juice Recordings, album CD 2008)
- 'Motion 日本版' (Cherry Juice Recordings 2008)
- 'One Street Further' (Cherry Juice Recordings 2008)
- 'Si tu m'aimes encore' (Cherry Juice Recordings 2008)
- 'Si tu m'aimes encore – Eddy de Clercq Re-Bleep' (Cherry Juice Recordings 2009)
- 'One for a Moment' (Cherry Juice Recordings 2010)
- 'Hear My Voice' (Cherry Juice Recordings 2022)

== Remixes ==
- 'Ramon' (Ma'Larsen, CD, France 2004)
- 'Shukran Bamba' (Youssou N'dour, Bootleg, 2005)
- 'Edna Bulgarska Roza' (Pacha Hristova, Bootleg, 2005)
- 'Party Spirit' (2 remixes, Linda Lamb, Sweet Smelling Surfaces, 2006)
- 'Travolta' (Ma'Larsen, CD, France 2006)
- 'Ouh Bébé' (Butch Bitches, Cherry Juice 2007)
- 'Rain' (Erica LaFay, Wallshaker 2009)
- 'Sea Sex & Sun' (Eddy de Clercq, Ubuntu 2009)
