= Sciences et Avenir =

Monthly French science magazine

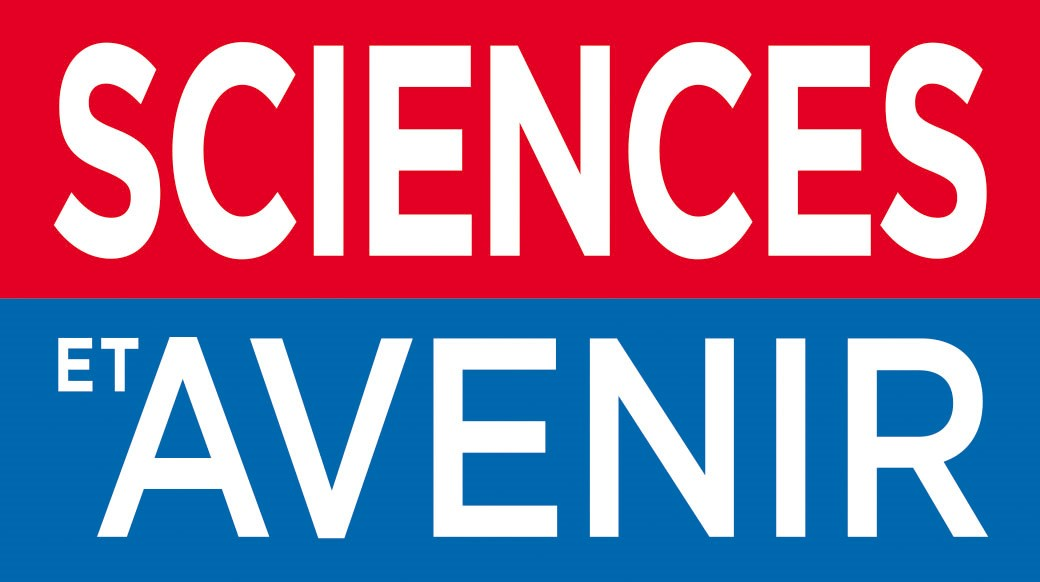

Sciences et Avenir (meaning Science and Future in English) is a monthly French popular science magazine, owned by Claude Perdriel. Its distribution in 2019 was 231,000 copies. The editorial team also publish about 15 articles per day on their website.

== History ==
The magazine was founded in 1947. From 1994 to 2003 it was edited by Georges Golbérine. Since September 2003, the managing editor is Carole Chatelain, who has a PhD in nuclear physics and particle physics.

2019-2020, the magazine released a spinoff magazine, "#Sciences", aimed at young people aged 11 and over.
