= Pierre Rabhi =

French writer, farmer, and poet (1938–2021)

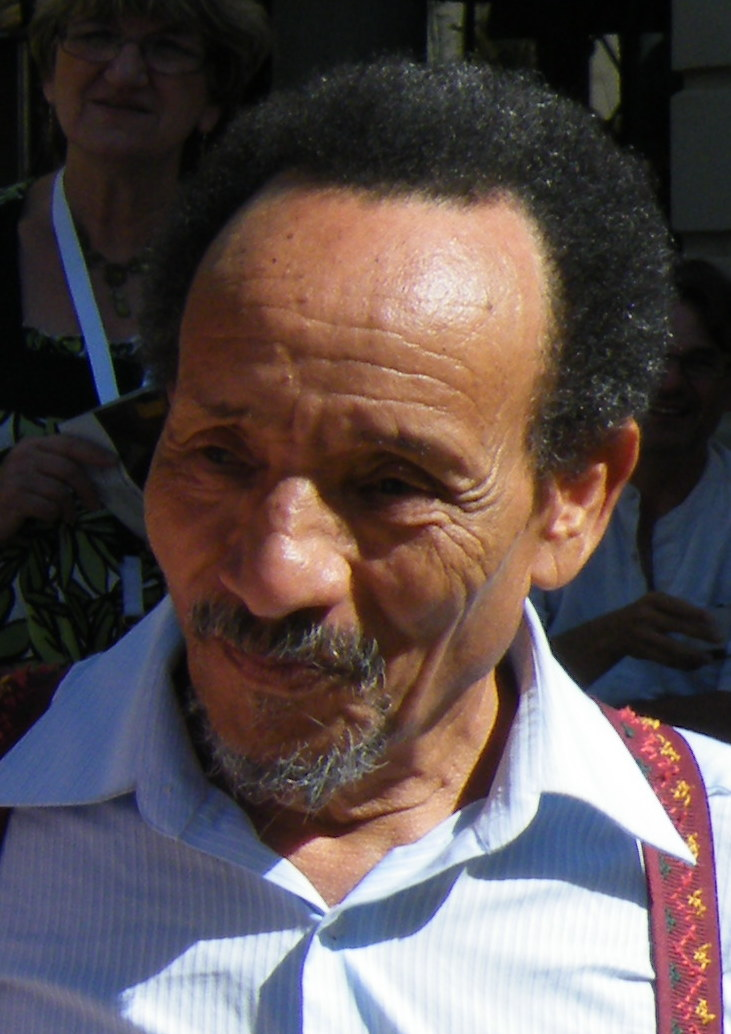
- Rabhi in 2009
- Born: Rabah Rabhi; 29 May 1938; Kénadsa, French Algeria, France
- Died: 4 December 2021 (aged 83)
- Known for: Writing and environmentalism

Pierre Rabhi (born Rabah Rabhi; 29 May 1938 – 4 December 2021) was a French writer, farmer, and environmentalist. Originally a Muslim, he converted to Christianity before abandoning that religion as well. Rabhi studied in France, and is considered an important figure in French agroecology. He invented the concept of an oasis en tous lieux ("an oasis in any place").

Rabhi advocated a society which respects its population and land, supporting the development of agricultural techniques which preserve natural resources. His theories relate particularly, although not exclusively, to arid countries. His use of anthroposophically based biodynamic agriculture was controversial. He died on 4 December 2021, at the age of 83.

== Youth ==
Rabhi was born into a Muslim family in Kénadsa, near Béchar (an oasis in southern Algeria), in 1938. His mother died when he was four years old. Rabhi's father—who was a blacksmith, musician, and poet—became acquainted with a French couple (an engineer who was a primary school teacher and his wife) when they came to work during the colonial period at the compagnie des houillères (coal-mining company) in his native village. Since the couple were childless and the elder Rabhi was concerned about his son's future, he allowed them to raise Pierre if he remained an observant Muslim. Rabhi's father later had to close his workshop and work in the mine, which influenced Pierre's philosophy. He spent his childhood in France and Algeria, in the Catholic and Muslim worlds, until he was 14.

== Paris ==
Rabhi found work as a technician and married Michelle, a coworker. Both of them dreamed of escaping urban life, and they considered the possibility of farming. He met Pierre Richard, an ecologist who was involved in the creation of the Cévennes National Park and who encouraged them. They decided to move to Ardèche, where they lived from 1960 on; their move predated the late-1960s French neo-rural movement.

== Return to the land ==
When they arrived in Ardèche, they married in Malarce-sur-la-Thines. They had a child and, with no knowledge of agriculture, Rabhi registered with a Maison familiale rurale (a centre run by volunteer groups, funded by the French national and regional governments) and earned a certificate. In 1963, after three years as an agricultural worker, he became a small goat farmer in the Cévennes ardéchoises. He did not want to follow the productivist model in which he had been trained.

== Recognition ==
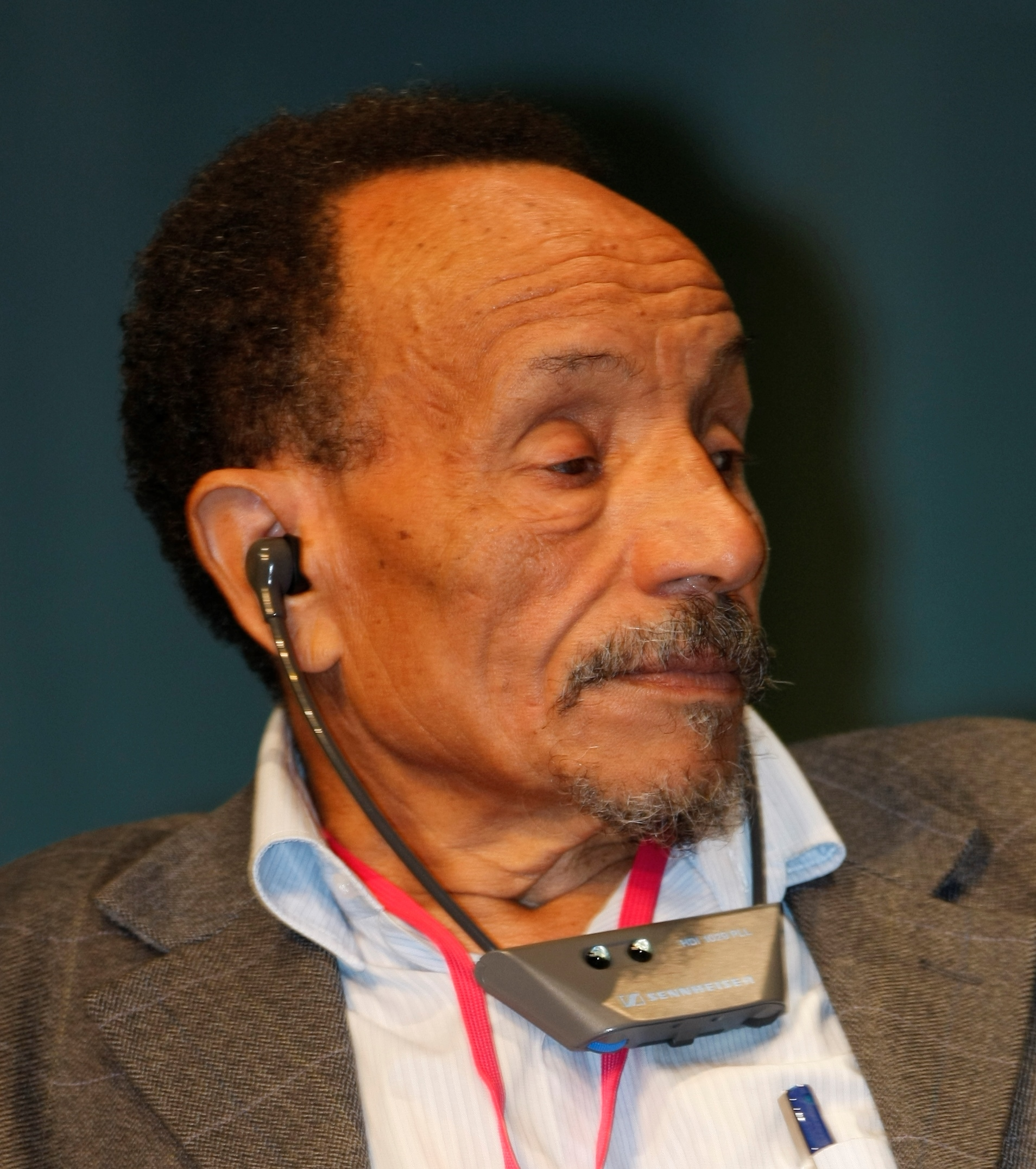
Rabhi at a 2009 conference

In 1978, Rabhi was given responsibility for training in agricultural ecology at CEFRA (Centre d'études et de formation rurales appliqués, Centre for Applied Rural Studies and Training). Beginning in 1981, at the request of the French government, he visited Burkina Faso as a Farmer Without Frontiers in a programme funded by the CRIAD (Centre de relations internationales entre agriculteurs pour le développement, Centre for International Relations Between Farmers and for Development). In 1985, Rabhi set up the agroecology training centre at Gorom-Gorom, with the support of the Le Point-Mulhouse association. An assessment of his work by French ecologist René Dumont criticised Rabhi's agronomic knowledge and the influence of his mystical beliefs on his work; it is the only scientific assessment of Rabhi's work to date. Burkina Faso President Thomas Sankara supported the project and wanted to make agroecology a national policy before his assassination in 1987.

In 1988, Rabhi founded the CIEPAD (Carrefour international d'échanges de pratiques appliquées au développement, International Forum for the Sharing of Knowledge About Applied Practices) with the support of the Hérault departmental council. He developed a model agricultural site, educational and training programs, and began overseas-development programs in Morocco, Palestine, Algeria, Tunisia, Senegal, Togo, Benin, Mauritania, Poland, and Ukraine. In 1992, Rabhi began a program for the rehabilitation of the Chenini-Gabès oasis in Tunisia. From 1994 on he led the Oasis en tous lieux (an oasis in any place) movement, which aims to promote an earth that can produce food and revive social involvement. In 1997 and 1998, Rabhi was asked to prepare proposals for the implementation of his plan in preparation for the Agreement on Action Against Desertification (Convention de lutte contre la désertification, or CCD). From 1999 to 2001, he began development initiatives in the Agadez region in Niger and the Gao region in Mali. Rabhi began a pre-presidential campaign in 2012, obtaining the support of 184 elected representatives and beginning the Mouvement d'appel pour une insurrection des consciences (MAPIC, the Movement Calling for an Insurrection of Consciences). He led conferences and workshops on themes relating to simplicité volontaire (simple living) and décroissance - degrowth. Preparing for the altermondialisme (alter-globalisation) movement, Rabhi was invited to the European Social Forum; one of his speeches was "Donner une âme à la mondialisation" ("Giving a Soul to Globalisation"). In 2007, he founded the Mouvement international pour la terre et l'humanisme (International Movement for Earth and Humanism). President of Terre et Humanisme, Rabhi was a member of the editorial board of the French monthly La Décroissance, and was vice-president of the Kokopelli Seed Foundation. The foundation works to protect biodiversity in the production and distribution of organically- and biodynamically grown seeds and for the regeneration of fertility in cultivated soils.

== Controversy ==
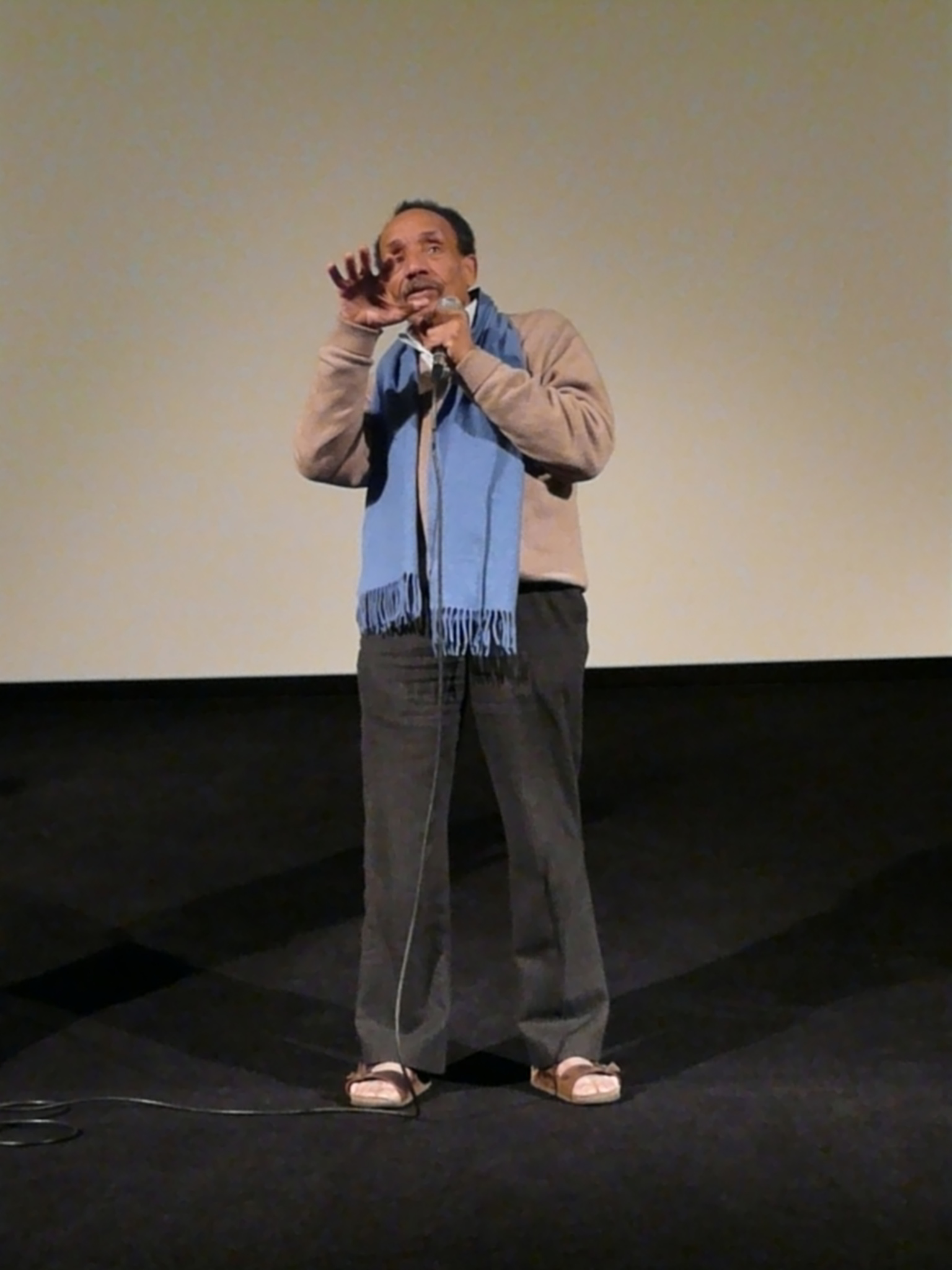
Rabhi at a debate in Nantes, 2010

Rabhi was at times the subject of controversy. His links to anthroposophy, a philosophy rooted in esoteric beliefs, were questioned. Rabhi promoted disciplines stemming from Rudolf Steiner, including Waldorf education, biodynamic agriculture, and anthroposophic medicine, some of which are considered pseudoscience. His agronomic skills were contested; despite claims of outstanding results through his agricultural techniques, no external assessment of his work was ever done following a critical evaluation by René Dumont in 1988. An independent investigation led by the skeptical organization Association française pour l'information scientifique reported that his farm at the Mas de Beaulieu did not yield enough crops to feed his employees (despite hundreds of volunteer workers), in contrast to Rabhi's claims of good results.

== Bibliography ==
- Du Sahara aux Cévennes ou la reconquête du songe (autobiography), Éditions de Candide, Lavilledieu, 1983, rééd. Albin Michel, Paris, 1995, rééd as Du Sahara aux Cévennes : itinéraire d'un homme au service de la Terre-Mère, Albin Michel, Paris, 2002.
- Le Gardien du Feu (novel), Éditions de Candide, Lavilledieu, 1986; Éditions Albin Michel, Paris, 2003.
- L'Offrande au crépuscule (Prix des sciences sociales agricoles du ministère de l'Agriculture), Éditions de Candide, Lavilledieu, 1989, rééd. aux éditions L'Harmattan 2001.
- Le Recours à la terre (recueil d'articles), Éditions Terre du Ciel, Lyon, 1995, new éd. augm. 1999.
- Parole de Terre : une iniciation africaine, Éditions Albin Michel, Paris, 1996 (préface by Yehudi Menuhin).
- As in the Heart, So in the Earth (translation by Joseph Rowe of Parole de Terre), Park Street Press, Rochester, Vermont, 2007.
- Manifeste pour des Oasis en tous lieux, ouvrage collectif under the direction of Pierre Rabhi, 1997.
- Le Chant de la Terre, interview par Jean-Pierre et Rachel Cartier, Editions La Table Ronde, Paris, 2002.
- Graines de possibles, regards croisés sur l'écologie avec Nicolas Hulot, Ed Calmann-Lévy, Paris, 2005. ISBN 2-7021-3589-7
- Conscience et environnement, Éditions du Relié, Gordes, 2006.
- La part du colibri, l'espèce humaine face à son devenir, Éditions de l'aube, 2006 (témoignage for the 2005 Mouans-Sartoux book festival).
- Terre-Mère, Homicide volontaire ? Entretiens avec Jacques Olivier Durand, Le Navire en pleine ville, 2007.
- Manifeste pour la Terre et l'Humanisme, Pour une insurrection des consciences, Actes Sud, 2008.

== Participations ==
- 2014 : Seul est vaincu celui qui renonce, documentary by Jean-Yves Bilien
