= Benoît Rayski =

French journalist and essayist (1939–2024)

- Born: 19 February 1938; Paris, France
- Died: 20 March 2024 (aged 86)
- Occupations: Journalist; Essayist

Benoît Rayski (19 February 1938 – 20 March 2024) was a French journalist and essayist.

== Biography ==
Born in Paris on 19 February 1938, Benoît Rayski was the son of Adam Rayski, leader of the Jewish section of the FTP-MOI, a clandestine movement of the French Communist Party within the French Resistance. Benoît published approximately a dozen essays on the history of communism in the Resistance, notably L'Enfant juif et l’enfant ukrainien : réflexions sur une imposture and Le cadavre était trop grand. L'Affiche rouge, the latter of which discussed the Affiche Rouge and those who were sentenced to death for their participation.

In his earlier career, Rayski worked for France-Soir, L'Événement du jeudi, Le Matin de Paris, and Globe Hebdo. However, he later began writing for right-wing sources, such as Boulevard Voltaire and Riposte laïque, as well as others such as Atlantico and Causeur.

In October 2015, Rayski published an article in Atlantico discussing the reissue of Mein Kampf, which he claimed was a "bestseller in the Arab-Muslim world". The following month, Acrimed included him in an article dedicated to "hawkish editorialists", mentioning his claims to be a "left-wing Islamophobe" and a "right-wing Islamophobe". In 2016, he published a racially-charged article in Atlantico attacking Sihame Assbague, with a portion of his article stating: "I don't want to be mixed with thousands of Sihame Assbagues who spit on me. Me being happy in my garden. Lounging in my hammock. Me smoking cigar. Me reading Tintin in the Congo. Me dreaming of being in a palanquin carried by black people." In 2017, he commented on the erotic essays and novels of Marlene Schiappa, whom he called the "queen of sluts", provoking reactions from internet users. Two days later, Atlantico issued an apology letter from Rayski to Schiappa. The website's publishing director, Jean-Sébastien Ferjou, declared the comments "unjustifiable and inappropriate".

Benoît Rayski died on 20 March 2024, at the age of 86.

== Publications ==
- L'Enfant juif et l’enfant ukrainien (2001)
- Un livre rouge (2002)
- Ces étoiles qui brûlent en moi (2003)
- Jours tranquilles à Créteil : Voyage au bout d'une haine ordinaire (2004)
- Là où vont les cigognes : récit (2007)
- Le cadavre était trop grand : Guy Môquet piétiné par le conformisme de gauche (2008)
- L’Affiche rouge – 21 février 1944 (2009)
- L’homme que vous aimez haïr (2010)
- J'ai pour la France une étrange passion : Itinéraire amoureux (2012)
- L'antisémitisme peut-il être de gauche (2013)
- Le Gauchisme, maladie sénile du communisme (2013)
- Stèle pour le sous-lieutenant Grunberg : Lycéen et résistant guillotiné par Pétain (2014)
- Comment je suis devenu un sale Français : bref itinéraire d'un Juif polonais né en France (2015)
- Fils d'Adam, Nostalgies communistes (2017)
- Les bâtards de Sartre (2018)
- Les effacés de la terre : quelques jours dans la vie de Julie (2019)
