= Jean-Yves Bilien =

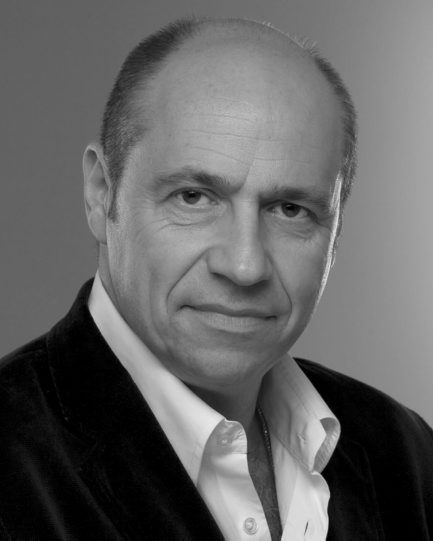
- Born: November 23, 1958 (age 67); Paris, France
- Occupations: Film director, film producer
- Years active: 1984–present

Jean-Yves Bilien (born November 23, 1958) is a French actor, film director, and film producer, best known for his work in documentary film.

== Career ==
Bilien was born in Paris and raised in the suburbs. He left school at the age of fifteen and worked in several jobs, including as a courier, waiter, archivist, and market vendor. Later, while employed at a travel agency, he met Michel Jobert, who invited him to a gala organized by Professor Luc Montagnier. There, Bilien met Charles Pasqua, who became a close friend and helped fund his first documentary project.

Bilien began acting professionally in 1984 and directed his first short film with François Marthouret. He performed in several stage plays alongside Robert Hossein, including Liberty or Death. On the set of The Transporter (2001), he met actor Jason Statham, who was relatively unknown at the time. Their encounter reignited Bilien's passion for film and motivated him to continue writing for theatre, television, and cinema.

Over the next fifteen years, Bilien worked as an actor, writer, and director, with a particular focus on topics related to science and health.

In 2011, he was awarded the title of Officer in the Ordre des Arts et des Lettres. In 2012, he co-directed Les sacrifiés des ondes with Luc Montagnier. He later directed Cancer, Business Mortel (2014), featuring Laurent Baffie, Pascal Olmeta, and Astrid Veillon. In 2018, he directed a documentary about his friend Pierre Rabhi. In 2019, he co-produced Enfant hypersensible, un présent pour l'avenir, a documentary featuring Frédéric Lenoir, with a production budget of €40,000.

== Filmography ==
=== As actor ===
- The Transporter (2002) – Little Thug
- The Bourne Identity (2002) – Bodyguard
- Un vampire au paradis (1992)
- Rossignol de mes amours (1991)

=== As director ===
- Un jour peut-être (1986)
- Partition en cinq secousses (1992, short film)
- Paulo et Lucienne (1994, short film)
- Christian Belgy alias Claude François (1997, documentary)
- Entretiens avec René Jacquier (2007, co-directed with Pantxo Arretz)
- Docteur André Gernez. Le Scandale du siècle – Parts 1 & 2 (2007–2008, documentary)
- Du Quinton contre la hernie discale (2008)
- Emmanuel Ransford, un autre regard sur la physique (2009)
- Les Guérisseurs, la foi, la science ! (2010)
- Entretien avec Franco Pereira Divaldo (2010)
- Léon Raoul Hatem, l’horloger de l’univers (2011)
- Antonin Poncik, une perception dermo-optique (2011)
- Les sacrifiés des ondes (2012, with Luc Montagnier)
- Fusion froide (2012, by Dr. Jean-Paul Biberian)
- Dr Olivier Soulier – Médecine du sens (2014)

== Awards and honours ==
- Ordre des Arts et des Lettres (2011)
