= Laurent Chambon =

French sociologist and politicologist

Laurent Pascal Chambon Guéguen (born 22 May 1972) is a French sociologist and politicologist who has resided in Amsterdam since 1998. A specialist of the question of minorities in politics, he was elected in the borough of Amsterdam Oud-Zuid for the Labour Party (PvdA) from March 2006 to May 2010. Chambon was the only non-Dutch European politician in the Netherlands at the time. He is a native of Châtenay-Malabry, south-southwest of Paris.

Co-founder of the minority-related website Minorités, he is a visible figure, as a sociologist and former politician, in French media to discuss the Netherlands, as well as in the Dutch media to discuss France. He was a correspondent for French-speaking media in the Netherlands (particularly Têtu and Libération).

A doctor (PhD) in political science and a former pupil at the Lycée Lakanal, he is also a producer for Cherry Juice Recordings and a musician as Laurent Outang, one half of Laurent & Lewis. He teaches French and political science. Chambon is member of the antiracist party BIJ1 and the antispecist party Party for the Animals (PvdD). He is also a member of the AOb and Teachers in action (Leraren in actie) trade unions.

== Works ==
- Le sel de la démocratie, l'accès des minorités au pouvoir politique en France et aux Pays-Bas (The Salt of Democracy, Minority Access to Political Power in France and the Netherlands), University of Amsterdam, 2002.
- Le grand mélange, Minorités, tolérance et faux-semblants dans la France de Nicolas Sarkozy, Éditions Denoël, Paris, April 2008.
- Überlove, Laurent & Lewis, Cherry Juice Recordings, May 2008 (CD).
- Marine ne perd pas le Nord, Éditions Le Muscadier, Paris, March 2012.
- Machine à danser, Laurent Outang, Testlab, June 2017.
- This Pill, The Uglicians, Cherry Juice Recordings, July 2019.
