= Lycée Lakanal =

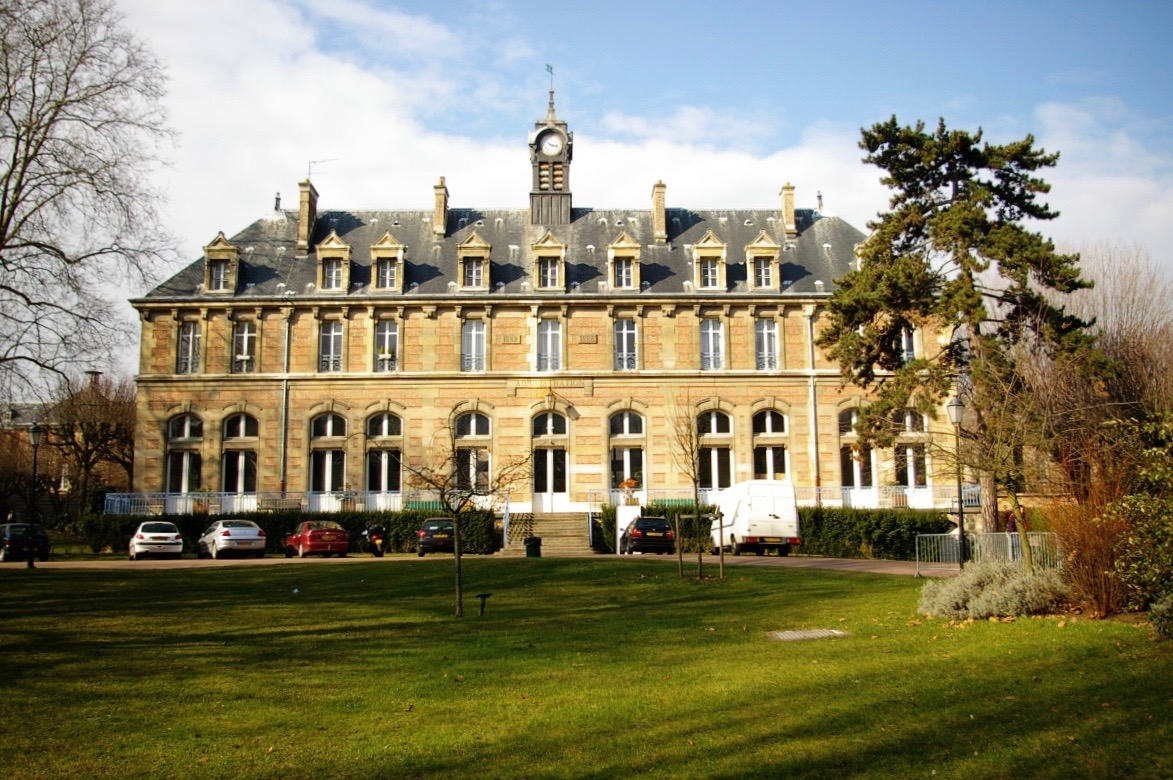

Location
- 3 Avenue du Président Franklin Roosevelt 92330 Sceaux; France; 48°46′35″N 2°18′15″E

Information
- Type: secondary school
- Established: 1885
- Principal: Corinne Raguideau (since 2019)
- Website: lyc-lakanal-sceaux.ac-versailles.fr/

Lycée Lakanal (French pronunciation: [lise lakanal]) is a public secondary school in Sceaux, Hauts-de-Seine, France, in the Paris metropolitan area. It was named after Joseph Lakanal, a French politician, and an original member of the Institut de France. The school also offers a middle school and highly ranked "classes préparatoires" undergraduate training. Famous French scientists and writers have graduated from lycée Lakanal, such as Jean Giraudoux, Alain-Fournier and Frédéric Joliot-Curie. The school includes a science building, a large park, a track, and dormitories for the Pôle Espoir Rugby and the boarding students. Several teachers also live at the school along with boarding students. The main classrooms and the dormitories are in one building, and the school uses space heaters in every classroom except the science building's classrooms and the gymnasium.

As of 2016 the school has about 2,550 students in all levels, from junior high school to preparatory classes.

== History ==
Jules Ferry, the Minister of Public Instruction in the 1880s, ordered the school built. Construction took place between 1882 and 1885.

== Notable alumni ==
- Charles Péguy (1873–1914), writer
- Paul Hazard (1878–1944), historian
- Jules Isaac (1877–1963), historian
- Marc Boegner (1881–1970), pastor and writer
- Jean Giraudoux (1882–1944), writer
- Alain-Fournier (1886–1914), writer
- Jacques Rivière (1886–1925), writer
- Maurice Genevoix (1890–1980), writer
- Frédéric Joliot-Curie (1900–1958), Nobel laureate in chemistry, physicist
- Robert Bresson (1901–1999), filmmaker
- Karl-Jean Longuet (1904–1981), sculptor
- Arthur Adamov (1908–1970), writer and playwright
- Carlos Delgado Chalbaud (1909–1950), politician, engineer, military officer from Venezuela
- Maurice Allais (1911–2010), economist, Nobel laureate in economics
- Pierre Hervé (1913–1993), deputy
- Jean-Toussaint Desanti (1914–2002), philosopher, professor at the École normale supérieure and the Sorbonne
- Jacques Chaban-Delmas (1915–2000), politician
- Jacques Durand (1920–2009), engineer and automobile designer
- Georges Condominas (1921–2011), ethnologist
- Jean-Jacques Pauvert (1926–2014), editor
- Emmanuel Le Roy Ladurie (1929–2023), historian, honorary professor at the Collège de France
- Gérard Genette (1930–2018), literary theorist
- Joël Schmidt, writer
- Dimitri Kitsikis (1935–2021), Geopolitician, Fellow, Royal Society of Canada, Honorary President, The Dimitri Kitsikis Public Foundation.
- James Austin (1940–), fine-art and architectural photographer
- Jacques Bouveresse (1940–2021), philosopher, professor at the Collège de France
- Colin François Lloyd Austin (1941–2010), scholar of ancient Greek
- Guy Hocquenghem (1946–1988), writer
- Julien Clerc (1947–), singer
- Rony Brauman (1950–), doctor
- Laurent Collet-Billon (1950–), general delegate for armament
- Gérard Leclerc (1951–), journalist
- Philippe Laguérie (1952–), priest
- Renaud Van Ruymbeke (1952–), magistrate
- Denis Lensel (1954–), journalist and writer
- Sauveur Chemouni (1954–) founder of Invision Technologies, California
- Gilles Leroy (1958–), writer (Prix Goncourt 2007)
- Cédric Klapisch (1961–), director
- Christophe Claro (1962–), writer
- Laurent Vachaud (1964–), scriptwriter
- Emmanuel Bourdieu (1965–), writer, philosopher and director, son of sociologist and Collège de France professor Pierre Bourdieu
- Pap Ndiaye (1965–), politician, minister of National Education and Youth
- Marie NDiaye (1967–), writer (Prix Goncourt 2009)
- Christophe Ferré, writer
- Pierre Courtade (1915–1963), journalist and writer
- Francois Russo (1966-), designer
- Muriel Barbery (1969–), writer
- Yann Golanski (1971–), theoretical astrophysicist, mathematician and software pioneer
- Laurent Chambon (1972–), sociologist
- Guillaume Peltier (1976–), politician
- Grégory Lamboley (1982–), international French rugby player
- Yves Mourousi (1942–1998), news presenter and journalist

== Lycée Lakanal in popular culture ==
Lycée Lakanal is the visual basis for the fictional Kadic Junior High School/Kadic Academy from Code Lyoko. However, it is not in the same location as Lakanal, being in Boulogne-Billancourt just north of there.

Lycee Lakanal is mentioned in John Le Carre's Tinker Tailor Soldier Spy in Jim Prideaux's backstory.
