= Carole Chatelain =

French journalist

Carole Chatelain (born May 21, 1963, in N’djamena —ex-Fort-Lamy— Chad) is a French journalist. Former Editor-in-chief of the magazine Sciences et Avenir from 2008 to 2020, she was appointed Managing Editor for Sciences et avenir and La Recherche in 2021.

== Background ==
Carole Chatelain spent her early years in Chad and Madagascar, before enrolling in literary preparatory classes in 1981 at the Lycée Berthollet in Annecy (France), prior to a Modern Literature Master's at the University of Lyon III. She further attended a training in International Logistics at the Bioforce Institute in Lyon (France).

== Journalistic career ==
Carole Chatelain started her career as a journalist at the daily Lyon-Figaro in 1986 where she joined the news team notably covering Action directe and chronicling the judicial proceedings in criminal court. Having moved to Paris, she freelanced for a publishing house, Ça m'intéresse (Prisma Presse), VSD (Prisma Presse) and Santé Magazine before joining the Impact Médecin editorial team in 1997. Carole Chatelain was also entrusted the same year with the news section of the Ça m'intéresse magazine. She joined the GEO editorial team in 1999 where she was specifically responsible for environmental reportings.

Carole Chatelain became Editor in Chief of the daily newspaper 20 Minutes in 2005 prior to holding the same position for the Sciences et Avenir magazine in 2008.

She was promoted Managing Editor for both Sciences et Avenir and La Recherche magazines by Claude Perdriel, founder and director of the press group, in January 2021.
