= Marie Susini =

Marie Susini (January 18, 1916 – August 22, 1993) was a French author known for her writing about her native Corsica.

== Early life and education ==
Marie Susini was born in Renno, Corsica, in 1916. She was raised by nuns in Vico, then attended school in Beaune. After living for a period in Marseille, she studied philosophy and literature in Paris, taking particular interest in the work of Henri Bergson. She attended the École du Louvre and the Collège de France.

== Career ==
Susini worked as a personal secretary for Abel Bonnard, the minister of national education during the fascist Vichy regime. After the war, she worked until her retirement as a librarian and curator at the Bibliothèque nationale de France.

Susini was the author of various works of literature, beginning with her "Corsican trilogy" of two novels and a play: Plein soleil (1953), La fiera (1954), and Corvara (1955). Her writing speaks of Corsica, of the island's isolation, and of the power of unexpressed feelings. The novel C'était cela notre amour is among her best-known works. Albert Camus encouraged her to pursue writing about her native island.

From 1971 until her death, she served on the jury for the Prix Femina literary award.

She also played the role of "Mathieu's wife" in Robert Bresson's 1967 film Mouchette.

== Personal life and death ==
Susini never married, but she was a longtime partner of the journalist Jean Daniel.

She died while visiting Orbetello, Italy, in 1993, and is buried in Vico, Corsica, where she grew up.

== Selected works ==
- Plein soleil (novel). 1953.
- La fiera (novel). Méditerranée. Éditions du Seuil. 1954.
- Corvara, ou la Malédiction (play in one act and three scenes). 1955.
- Un pas d'homme (novel). Éditions du Seuil. 1957.
- Le premier regard : récit. Éditions du Seuil. 1960.
- Les yeux fermés (novel). Éditions du Seuil. 1964.
- C'était cela notre amour (novel) (in French). 1970.
- Je m'appelle Anna Livia (novel). B. Grasset. 1979. ISBN 978-2-246-00843-9.
- La renfermée, la Corse (essay). with photographs by Chris Marker. Seuil. 1981. ISBN 978-2-02-005900-8.
- L'île sans rivages. Éd. du Seuil. 1989. ISBN 978-2-02-010944-4.
