= Têtu =

French LGBTQ magazine

- Founded: 1995; 2017
- Final issue: 2015
- Country: France
- Based in: Paris
- Language: French
- Website: www.tetu.com
- ISSN: 1265-3578

Têtu (pronounced [tety], French for "stubborn") is the main LGBTQIA magazine published in France. It was subtitled in French le magazine des gays et lesbiennes (English: the magazine of gays and lesbians) until 2007, and reaffirmed itself as a men's magazine since then. As of December, 2012, its certified circulation was of 41,961 copies monthly. Publication stopped in 2015 until the magazine was reborn and issued its next issue on 28 February 2017.

== History ==
Published since 1995, co-founded by Didier Lestrade and Pascal Loubet, and historically directed by Pierre Bergé, Têtu was started following the demise of Gai Pied magazine (published between 1979 and 1992). Pierre Bergé sold the magazine in January 2013 and since then it has been owned by Jean-Jacques Augier.

Têtu declared bankruptcy in January 2015 and went into liquidation in July 2015 having made €1.1million ($1.2million) in losses in 2014.

In November 2015 a French start-up, Idyls, bought Têtu and it started publishing again online only.

== Overview ==
The magazine contains interviews on LGBT issues, with politicians, celebrities, writers, dancers and so forth, along with articles and reviews on LGBT-themed books, films, plays or video games. Another section is concerned with LGBT news around the world, country by country. There are also posters, advertisements of brand clothes for men. Additionally, some pages are dedicated to news about AIDS, prevention and treatment. Periodically a free information guide entitled Têtu+ is published about HIV and AIDS.

The magazine has also touched upon international cases when coming to LGBTQs public figures of non-French cultures. In October 2012, Tetu have sent reporters to Jordan to do a story on Jordanian LGBT magazine's spokesperson, model Khalid, aka Kali of My.Kali magazine.

== Controversy ==
In July 2011, Alexis Palisson featured shirtless, wearing a fake moko and holding a taiaha. This caused controversy in New Zealand, with some Māori people saying that Palisson was being disrespectful to their culture and that permission should have been sought from a particular iwi as the moko usually represents iwi affiliation. Palisson was eventually forced to apologise for any offence caused and stressed that he respects tattoo traditions.
