= Le Nouvel Obs =

Weekly French news magazine

- Editor: Cécile Prieur
- Categories: News magazine
- Frequency: Weekly
- Circulation: 212,729 (2020)
- Publisher: Groupe Nouvel Observateur
- Founded: 15 April 1950; 76 years ago
- Country: France
- Based in: Paris
- Website: www.nouvelobs.com
- ISSN: 3037-054X (print); 3036-9703 (web)

Le Nouvel Obs (French: [lə nuvɛl ɔps]), previously known as L'Obs (2014–2024), Le Nouvel Observateur (1964–2014), France-Observateur (1954–1964), L'Observateur aujourd'hui (1953–1954), and L'Observateur politique, économique et littéraire (1950–1953), is a weekly French news magazine. Based in the 2nd arrondissement of Paris, Le Nouvel Obs is one of the three most prominent French news magazines alongside Le Point and L'Express. Its current editor is Cécile Prieur.

== History and profile ==
The magazine was established in 1950 as L'Observateur politique, économique et littéraire. It became L'Observateur aujourd'hui in 1953 and France-Observateur in 1954. The name Le Nouvel Observateur was adopted in 1964. The 1964 incarnation of the magazine was founded by Jean Daniel and Claude Perdriel.

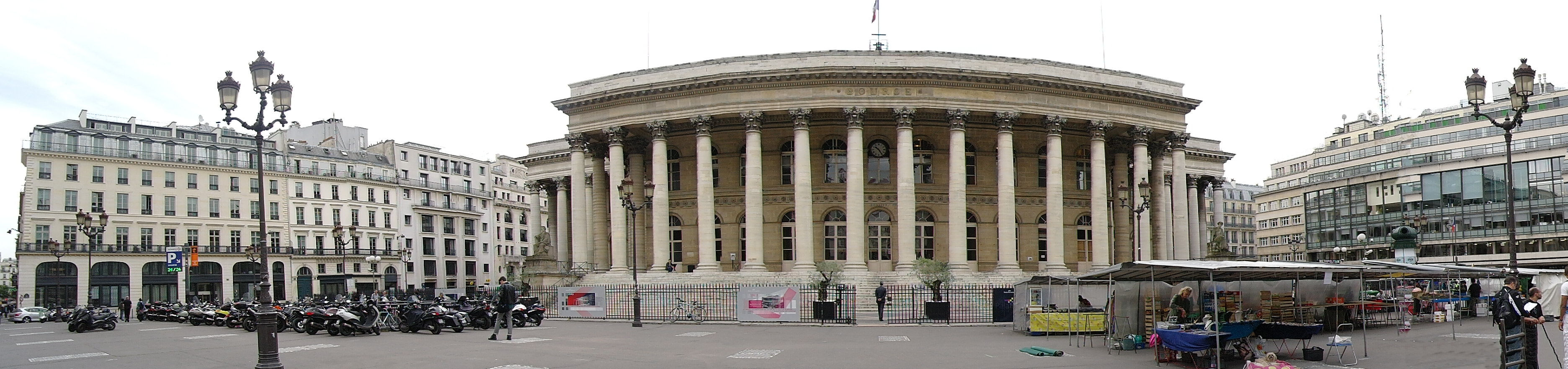
The head office is in the building to the left, 10–12 Place de la Bourse, Paris

Since 1964, Le Nouvel Observateur has been published by Groupe Nouvel Observateur on a weekly basis and has covered political, business and economic news. It features extensive coverage of European, Middle Eastern and African political, commercial and cultural issues. Its strongest areas are political and literary matters, and it is noted for its in-depth treatment of the day's main issues. It has been described as "the French intellectuals' parish magazine", or more pejoratively as "the quasi-official organ of France's gauche caviar [caviar left]". It is often referred to as Le Nouvel Obs for short.

Franz-Olivier Giesbert joined the Nouvel Observateur in 1971 as a journalist in the political department and then became a reporter. In 1985, Giesbert became the editorial director.

Patrick Fiole and Christina Sourieau launched the magazine's internet site in 1999.

The magazine's new charter, adopted in June 2004 (on the 40th anniversary of its foundation), outlines the paper's principles: "The Nouvel Observateur is a cultural and political weekly whose orientation belongs within the general social-democratic movement. A tradition ever concerned with combining respect for freedom and the quest for social justice."

Alongside its editorial activities, the Nouvel Observateur group bought the online news site Rue89 in December 2011, becoming its only shareholder.

In January 2014, the owners of Le Monde, Pierre Bergé, Xavier Niel, and Matthieu Pigasse, purchased a 65% stake in the magazine. On 12 March 2014 the two co-directors of the press group, Laurent Joffrin and Nathalie Collin, resigned because the Nouvel Observateur was being sold to Le Monde.

On 23 October 2014, the magazine was renamed L’Obs and its layout was changed to include in-depth reports on investigations, stories and discussions of ideas.

Its current editorial board is headed by two of its co-founders, Jean Daniel and Claude Perdriel, two editors-in-chief, Laurent Joffrin and Serge Lafaurie, and the director general, Jacqueline Galvez. André Gorz and other journalists who had left L'Express helped to found the publication.

The holding company Le Monde Libre, the majority shareholder of Groupe Le Monde, owns 99% of the weekly Le Nouvel Obs.

On 21 March 2024, the magazine changed its name from L'Obs to Le Nouvel Obs.

== Related publications ==
Le Nouvel Observateur formerly published ParisObs, a general information supplement focusing on Paris and the Île-de-France region, also published weekly.

Challenges is an international business magazine published by Le Nouvel Observateur since 1982. Released every two weeks, it contains information on companies and their managers at the CEO level all around the world.

TéleObs is a supplement containing articles about TV and cinema. It was published every two weeks until October 2014, when it began to be published weekly.

In March 2012, Le Nouvel Observateur launched Obsession, a monthly supplement focused on fashion.

== Circulation ==
The circulation of Le Nouvel Observateur was 385,000 copies in 1981, 340,000 copies in 1987 and 370,000 copies in 1988.

In 2001–2002, the magazine had a circulation of 471,000 copies. In 2010, its circulation was 502,108 copies, making it the best-selling European news magazine.

The magazine had a circulation of 526,732 copies during the first half of 2013 and 460,780 copies in 2014.

In 2014, L'Obs was one of the highest-circulated news magazines in France.

| Year | Circulation |
| 2014 | 479,641 |
| 2015 | 417,398 |
| 2016 | 373,873 |
| 2017 | 346,625 |
| 2018 | 262,498 |
| 2019 | 225,304 |
| 2020 | 212,729 |

== See also ==
- L'Express - conservative news magazine
- Le Point - conservative news magazine
