= Isabelle Alonso =

French writer of Spanish extraction

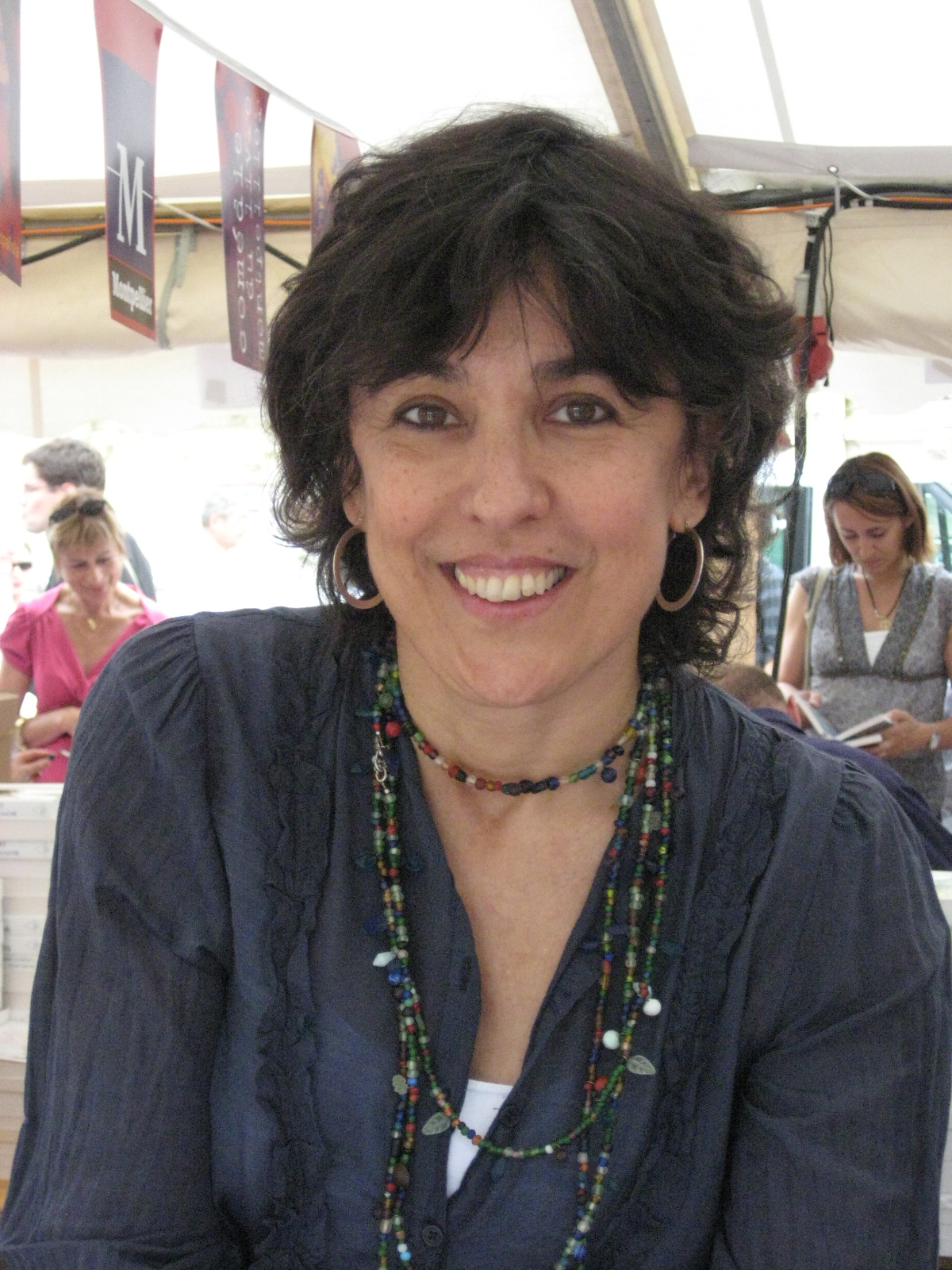
Alonso in 2009

Isabelle Alonso is a French writer of Spanish extraction. Her parents were exiled Spanish Republicans, and Alonso became a naturalized French citizen at the age of eight. She has published a series of books exploring her family history, among them L'Exil est mon pays (2006), Fille de rouge (2009) and Maman (2010).
