= Christine Bravo =

French television presenter

- Born: 13 May 1956 (age 68); Paris, France
- Occupation(s): Television presenter, journalist, columnist, author

Christine Bravo (born 13 May 1956) is a French television presenter, journalist, columnist and author.

== Biography ==
Christine Bravo was born in Paris, her father Antonio Bravo was a Spanish mason from Toledo. At the age of 18, she left her family to live in Paris. She met one year earlier Jean-Paul Sartre, while creating the newspaper Libération, in which she collaborates with the philosopher. After graduating in history at the Paris Diderot University, she passed the contest of normal school and became a teacher from 1979 to 1982. In 1980, she lived for one year in Tijuana, Mexico. After coming back to France, she published with an editor of Flammarion her first autobiographical novel Avenida B.

== Television career ==
=== Beginnings in the media ===
In 1983, she participated at a contest organized by Le Matin de Paris. The theme for the contestants was to write a letter about their vacation. The letter of Christine Bravo received the first prize and was published in the daily newspaper. Jean-Dominique Bauby, the chief editor of the culture section, engaged her as a journalist, where she stayed until the end of publication of the newspaper.

Christine Bravo became later a columnist for Elle and also collaborated for Le Journal du dimanche, L'Événement du jeudi, France Soir, Paris Match and Cosmopolitan. In 1988, she began her career in television and started collaborating with Frédéric Mitterrand in his program Permission de minuit. Christophe Dechavanne decides to entrust her the notepad of his program Ciel, mon mardi !, but she left the program. Bernard Rapp proposes her to host the section Bonheur in his program L'Assiette anglaise.

=== Television presenter ===
She started presenting on 24 January 1990 on channel FR3 her first program Mille Bravo about culture and modern art, broadcast on the third part of the evening on Friday. In April 1991, the program was broadcast the first Sunday of every month. In June 1991, Christine Bravo left FR3 to join Antenne 2 where she hosts Merci et encore bravo, broadcast on the third part of the evening on Thursday.

In September 1992, she hosts Frou-Frou until June 1994. She then presents Chérie, j'ai un truc à te dire in 1994 and J'ai un problème in 1995. That same year, she left the audiovisual and after appearing in an advertisement for a laundry powder, she took a sabbatical year.

1n 1998, she started again her career with Union libre on France 2 every two weeks. In 2002, she adapted the program to the French counties with Douce France every Saturday. After a year, the program was not broadcast anymore.

== Personal life ==
Christine Bravo has two children, Mathieu (born in 1978) and Clara (born in 1992).
