= Didier Lestrade =

French author and advocate

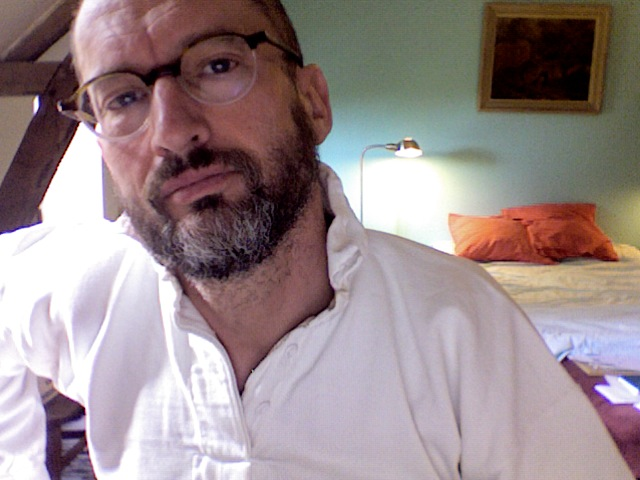
- Lestrade in 2010
- Born: 22 February 1958 (age 68); Médéa, French Algeria
- Occupations: Gay writer and journalist; Activist for LGBT and AIDS issues; Nightclub promoter
- Known for: Founded Magazine Trimestriel and Têtu; Founded ACT UP Paris and TRT-5.

Didier Lestrade (born 22 February 1958), is a French author, magazine publisher, AIDS and LGBT rights advocate.

== Biography ==
Didier Lestrade was born in Médéa, French Algeria. He grew up in the south-west of France, and left home in 1977 after failing twice to graduate from the baccalauréat. He then went to Paris, where he began working for the first French independent gay publication, Gaie Presse. This magazine was short-lived (four issues only). At the age of 22, he then decided to found Magazine Trimestriel, with Misti who soon became art director for the leading 1980s French gay newspaper, Gai pied. Magazine Trimestriel was considered by many to be the most influential all male underground gay publication of its time. Dazed and The New York Times website wrote a small story about recent Magazine exhibit in Paris, at the gallery 12Mail. Since then, Magazine is enjoying a revival of sorts with Butt magazine publishing an interview of Didier Lestrade.

In 1986, the publication folded after conducting ninety full-length interviews, in both English and French, including David Hockney, Bronski Beat, Brion Gysin, Divine, Gilbert & George, Bill Ward and Tom of Finland. Magazine was also a leading outlet for cutting-edge European and American male photography of that time, introducing vintage work from Pierre et Gilles, Patrick Sarfati, Erwin Olaf, and Paul Blanca, Stanley Stellar and many more. The last issues were up to 190 pages.

=== As an AIDS activist ===
In 1986, at the age of 28, Lestrade discovered he was HIV positive. He developed a career as a freelance music journalist, writing for Gai pied, Libération and Rolling Stone. He played an influential role in the new house/techno music scene, writing weekly reviews in Libération that were widely read. In 1989, at 31, he shifted his focus to AIDS activism, and founded the first French chapter of ACT UP with close friends and journalists Pascal R. Loubet and Luc Coulavin. He was president of Act Up-Paris for the three first critical years. In 1992, he played an important role in founding of TRT-5, a coalition of major French AIDS organizations. TRT-5 was at the forefront of AIDS treatment issues, and Lestrade was one of its administrators until 2002. By 2000, Lestrade switched from treatment issues to AIDS prevention and became a leading voice against barebacking and confronted the ground-breaking writer Guillaume Dustan. The romanesque story of this fight was written (without Lestrade's approval) in Tristan Garcia's first book, awarded by the prix de Flore, La meilleure part des hommes in 2008.

=== As a journalist ===
In 1995, at 37, Lestrade co-founded the leading French gay & lesbian monthly magazine, Têtu, again with the help of Pascal R. Loubet. Financed by Pierre Bergé, of Yves Saint Laurent fame, and run by Thomas Doustally, its editor in chief, Têtu is the most successful gay magazine in Europe. In 2008, he left Têtu and revamped a year later the website Minorités.org with fellow journalists Laurent Chambon from Netherlands and Mehmet Koksal from Belgium. He is editor in chief of the Minorités's weekly newsletter. The purpose of Minorités is to gather issues regarding minorities around the world.

=== As a writer ===
In 2000, Lestrade published his first book, Act Up, une Histoire (Denoël), a personal history of the first eleven years of Act Up-Paris. This was followed by Kinsey 6 (Denoël, 2002), an intimate cultural and sexual diary of the eighties, during the time he published Magazine. His next book was The End (Denoël, 2004), a fierce and controversial essay on the failure of AIDS prevention, and the phenomenon of barebacking in France. Lestrade left Paris in 2002 to live in rural French Normandy, near Alençon. He has always been a nature lover and a garden enthusiast. The following book, Cheikh, journal de campagne, was published in 2007 by Flammarion and related his five years of loneliness in the countryside after leaving Paris, influenced by the work of Henry David Thoreau. For this purpose, he travelled to Concord, Massachusetts, and visited Walden Pond. His fifth book, Chroniques du dance floor, Libération 1988–1999 is published in May 2010 by "l'éditeur Singulier". Lestrade has been featured in the 2006–07 edition of Who's Who in France.

In 2012, Lestrade published three books:

Sida 2.0 1981 - 2011, 30 ans de regards croisés (Fleuve Editions) on the AIDS crisis, with Pr. Gilles Pialoux. Pourquoi les gays sont passés à droite (Le Seuil) on the political shift to the right of some leaders of the European LGBT community. Chroniques du Journal du Sida (BOD) which is a collection of AIDS chronicles published from 1994 to 2013.

2017 saw the huge success of BPM (Beats per Minute), a story of Act Up-Paris, inspired by Didier Lestrade's first book, Act Up, une Histoire, which was republished with a second edition the same year. BPM won four awards at the 2017 Cannes Film Festival, including the Grand Prix.

In 2021, Lestrade published I Love Porn, a long-awaited essay on the history of the gay porn movement for Editions du Détour.

In 2024 he published his memoirs through Éditions Stock.

=== As a club promoter ===
In 2000, Lestrade along several friends opened, a monthly review at the Boule noire. This mixed house gay club with DJ resident Patrick Vidal lasted until 2004. Then he followed with Otra Otra with DJ resident Nick V until 2006. Lestrade also released two music compilations with Patrick Thévenin: Paradise Garage (Pschent, 1997) and Paradise Garage 2 (Pschent, 1999). Another compilation came in 2008: Slow Jamz & Hot Songs (WEA).

=== As a blogger ===
After leaving Têtu, Lestrade tried to focus his writing on Internet, as most of his articles during the last two decades can't be found online. He opened his blog, which has been considered by French GQ website as one of the twenty most influential blogs. In 2010, he started his own website dedicated to archives from his career as a journalist, on topics like music, photography, AIDS activism and gay porn.

== Bibliography ==
- Didier Lestrade, Act Up. Une histoire, Paris, Denoël, 2000 (ISBN 2-207-24883-6).
- Didier Lestrade, Kinsey 6 : Journal des années 80, Paris, Denoël, 2002 (ISBN 978-2207252192).
- Didier Lestrade, The End, Paris, Denoël, 2004 (ISBN 2-207-25424-0).
- Didier Lestrade, Cheikh. Journal de campagne, Paris, Flammarion, 2007 (ISBN 978-2-08-068964-1).
- Didier Lestrade, Chroniques du dance floor. Libération 1988–1999, Paris, Singulier, 2010 (ISBN 978-2953346718).
- Didier Lestrade (with Gilles Pialoux), Sida 2.0 - Regards croisés sur 30 ans d'une épidémie, Paris, Fleuve Noir, 2012, (ISBN 978-2265094529),
- Didier Lestrade, Pourquoi les gays sont passés à droite, Paris, Le Seuil, 2012, (ISBN 978-2021050370).
- Didier Lestrade, Minorités : l'essentiel, Paris, Des ailes sur un tracteur, 2014, (ISBN 978-1291780277).
- Didier Lestrade, Le Journal du Sida - Chroniques 1994 / 2013, Paris, Books on Demand, 2014, (ISBN 978-2322039128).
