= Jean Daniel =

French journalist and author (1920–2020)

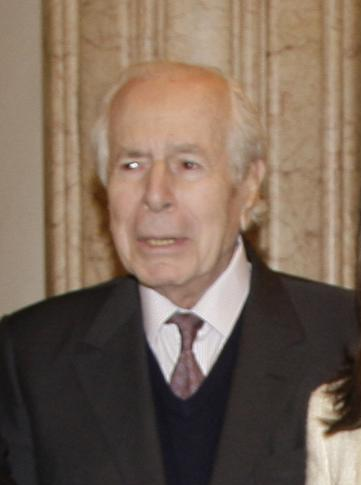
- Born: Jean Daniel Bensaid; 21 July 1920; Blida, Algeria
- Died: 19 February 2020 (aged 99); Paris, France
- Education: University of Algiers; Sorbonne
- Occupation: Journalist
- Known for: Founder of Le Nouvel Observateur
- Spouse: Michèle Bancilhon
- Children: Sara Daniel

Jean Daniel Bensaid (21 July 1920 – 19 February 2020) was a French journalist and author. He was the founder and executive editor of Le Nouvel Observateur weekly now known as L'Obs.

== Life and career ==
Daniel was born in Blida, Algeria, as the youngest of 11 children. His father, Jules Bensaid, was a flour miller. Jean Daniel attended the University of Algiers before the Second World War. During the war, he was part of a resistance group that aided the liberation of Algiers, and he participated in the Normandy landings as part of the Free French forces led by Philippe Leclerc. Following the war, Daniel attended Sorbonne University (studying philosophy) and worked for Félix Gouin as a speechwriter.

Daniel was a Jewish humanist in the tradition of the French Left. He was a colleague and friend of Albert Camus, a fellow pied-noir (French-Algerian). In La prison juive: Humeurs et méditations d'un témoin (The Jewish Prison), Daniel argued that prosperous, assimilated Jews in the west live in a self-imposed prison made of up of three invisible walls: the idea of the Chosen People, Holocaust remembrance, and support for Israel. "Having trapped themselves inside these walls...," wrote Adam Shatz in describing the book, "they were less able to see themselves clearly, or to appreciate the suffering of others -- particularly the Palestinians living behind the 'separation fence'."

Daniel was a member of the Saint-Simon Foundation think-tank.

His first life partner was the Corsican writer Marie Susini. He later married Michèle Bancilhon, with whom he had one daughter, the journalist Sara Daniel.

=== Journalism ===
In 1947 Daniel co-founded the Caliban magazine, which ran until 1951. Following its closure Daniel became a teacher, until he was hired as a reporter by L'Express in 1956. Daniel covered the Algerian War for L'Express; he was sympathetic to the independence cause and received death threats from the Organisation armée secrète (OAS). He was interviewing Fidel Castro in Havana as news came through of the assassination of John F. Kennedy. Castro said "es una mala noticia" ("this is bad news"), perceiving that he would be blamed in some quarters for the assassination. Kennedy had given Daniel a message to pass to Castro, which said that the U.S. could respect a "nationalist, even communist" government of Cuba, but could not relate to a country that was "indentured" to the Soviet Union.

He co-founded the French magazine Le Nouvel Observateur in 1964, which had existed since 1950 as L'Observateur politique, économique et littéraire (1950–53), L'Observateur aujourd'hui (1953–54) and France Observateur (1954–64). The 1964 incarnation of the magazine was when Jean Daniel and Claude Perdriel took over renaming the magazine and starting its best known phase under the name Le Nouvel Observateur as a weekly. Since then it has been published by Groupe Nouvel Observateur on a weekly basis and has covered political, business and economic news in France and internationally. On 23 October 2014, the magazine was renamed L'Obs.

== Published works ==
=== Books ===
- The Jewish Prison: a Rebellious Meditation on the State of Judaism translated into English by Charlotte Mandell, 2005, Melville House Publishing, USA

=== Articles ===
- "We Already Miss His Vigilance" Telos 44 (Summer 1980). New York: Telos Press
