= Georges Condominas =

French anthropologist (1921–2011)

Georges Louis Condominas
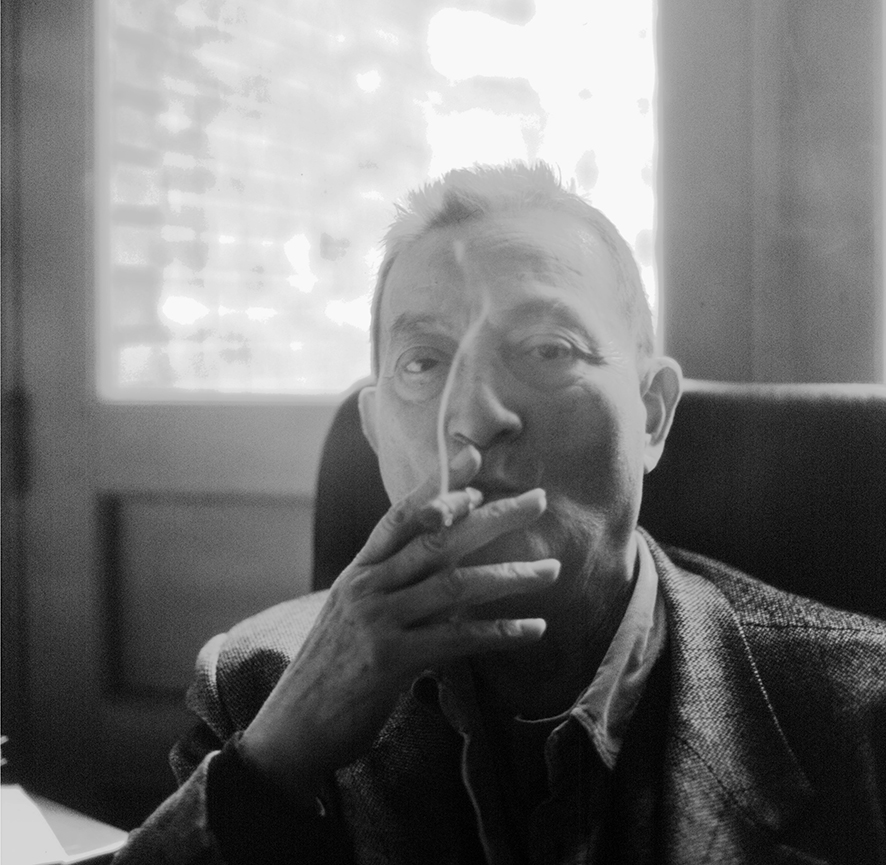
- Born: June 29, 1921; Haiphong, French Indochina
- Died: July 17, 2011 (aged 90); Paris, France
- Occupations: Cultural anthropologist, ethnographer

Georges Louis Condominas (29 June 1921 – 17 July 2011) was a French cultural anthropologist best known for his field studies of the Mnong people of Vietnam.

== Biography ==
Georges Condominas was born on June 29, 1921 in Haiphong, French Indochina (present-day Vietnam). His father was a French officer in the Colonial Army and his mother had Chinese, Vietnamese and Portuguese ancestry.

=== Education ===
Condominas studied at the Lycée Lakanal, a secondary school in Paris, but kept in touch with his father through letters and photographs. After graduating, he remained in France to study law. He then returned to Indochina to work in the colonial administration, but later gave up this job and studied art in Hanoi. Following the defeat of the French government in 1940 during World War II, Japan occupied Indochina and Condominas was imprisoned.

After the war, he studied ethnology and returned to Paris to follow the lectures of famous professors of the time such including André Leroi-Gourhan, Denise Paulme and Marcel Griaule at the Musée de l'Homme. He additionally learned from Maurice Leenhardt at the École pratique des hautes études (EPHE), a graduate school in Paris.

=== Fieldwork in Sar Luk ===
One of his first ethnological field sites in Vietnam was in the village of Sar Luk in the province of Đăk Lăk. Condominas wrote two books based on his experiences in Sar Luk and study of the indigenous Mnong people: We Have Eaten the Forest (1957) and L'exotique est quotidien (1965). The latter book detailed human rights abuses against the Mnong by United States forces as part of the Vietnam War.

=== Career and research ===
After this first major field study, Condominas studied at other field sites in Madagascar and Togo and worked for UNESCO in Thailand, Laos, and Cambodia.

In 1960, he became professor at the École pratique des hautes études, where he had studied earlier in his career. While at EPHE, he founded CeDRASEMI, a research center focused on South East Asia and Insulindia (the Malay Archipelago).

Condominas was Visiting Professor at Columbia University and Yale University between 1963 and 1969. He was Fellow of the Center for Advanced Studies in the Behavioral Sciences of Palo Alto in 1971. In 1972, he gave the Distinguished Lecture of the annual session of the American Anthropological Association, where he denounced the Vietnam War and the ethnocide of the Mnong. He was a close friend of Margaret Mead, John Embree and Elisabeth Wiswell Embree. He was considered as a master of ethnology in Japan, where he was the first foreigner ever to give a speech at the Nihon Minzoku Gakkai, a Japanese anthropological association, for its 50th anniversary.

He was also invited to the Australian National University in 1987 and to Sophia University in Japan in 1992.

His work inspired many books and movies. The recording he made of Mnong music can be heard at the end of Francis Ford Coppola's 1979 film Apocalypse Now, the final scene of which was inspired by Condominas's description of the ritual slaughter of a buffalo.

For the opening of the Musée du quai Branly in 2006, an exhibition was devoted to him and his field site of Sar Luk. The exhibition was also displayed the next year, in 2007, in Hanoï, Vietnam, with a bilingual catalog. Today, his working papers, his personal library and his pictures are preserved at the mediatheque of the Musée du quai Branly, available for scholars and researchers. His audio records are preserved and digitized by the French Research Center for Ethnomusicology (LESC, CNRS, Paris Ouest University).

=== Use of work during the Vietnam War ===
In 1972, Condominas alleged that the United States Department of Commerce and the United States Embassy in Saigon had translated his research on Vietnam into English and provided it to American military forces fighting in the country. He obtained this information from one of his research participants, who had previously been tortured by the Americans. As an opponent of the Vietnam War, Condominas condemned the military use of his research, and claimed that it contributed to an ongoing ethnocide against the Mnong people.

=== Illness and death ===
Condominas died between Saturday and Sunday, July 17, 2011, from a heart attack at the Hôpital Broca in Paris, France. He had reportedly been in poor health for several years prior to his death.

== Publications ==
=== Books ===
- Nous avons mangé la forêt de la Pierre-Génie Gôo (Hii saa Brii Mau-Yaang Gôo). Chronique de Sar Luk, village mnong gar (tribu proto-indochinoise des Hauts-Plateaux du Viet-nam central), Paris, Mercure de France, 1954 (2nd edition 1974, 2003; paperback edition Flammarion, 1982; transl. Italian, Milan, 1960; Russian, Moscow, 1968; German, Frankfurt, 1969; English, New York, Harmondsworth, 1977 and republished New York and Tokyo, 1994; Japanese, Tokyo, 1993; Vietnamese, Hanoi, 2003; Hungarian, Budapest, in preparation).
- L' Exotique est quotidien, Sar Luk, Vietnam central, Paris, Plon, 1965 (Collection Terre humaine) (2nd edition 1977; transl. Spanish with preface by Manuel Delgado, Barcelona, 1992).
- Fokon 'olona et collectivités rurales en Imerina, preface by Hubert Deschamps, Paris, Berger-Levrault, 1960, 234 p., cov. ill map; bibliog. p. 23 1–234 (L’homme d’Outre-Mer. Nouvelle série. 3) (2nd edition ORSTOM, 1991).
- L’Espace social. A propos de l’Asie du Sud-Est, Paris, Flammarion, 1980 (transl. Vietnamese, Hanoi, 1997). Republication underway by Editions Les Indes savantes.
- From Lawa to Mon, from Saa' to Thai: historical and anthropological aspects of Southeast Asian social spaces, transl. by Stephanie Anderson, Maria Magannon and Gehan Wijeyewardene, Canberra, Department of Anthropology, Research School of Pacific Studies, Australian National University, 1990, VI-114 p., ill., maps, plan, photographs; glossary (An occasional paper of the department of anthropology, in association with the Thai-Yunnan project).
- L 'Espace social = Raya thaang sangkhôm, Bangkok, Cahiers de France, 1991 (transl. Thai by Chatchada Ratanasamakarn and Sumitra Baffie).
- Le Bouddhisme au village = Val sonna bot: notes ethnographiques sur les pratiques religieuses dans la société rurale lao (plaine de Vientiane), Vientiane, Cahiers de France, 1998 (transl. Laotian by Saveng Phinith).

=== Editorship of collective works ===
- Agriculture et societies en Asie du Sud-Est, Etudes rurales, 53–56, Jan.-Dec. 1974 (co-edited with J. Barrau, L. Bernot and I. Chiva).
- L’Anthropologie en France: situation actuelle et avenir. Acts of the international colloquium organized at the CNRS by G. Condominas and S. Dreyfus-Ganielon, 18–22 April 1977, Paris, CNRS, 1979.
- Disciplines croisées: hommage à Bernard Philippe Groslier, Paris EHESS, 1992 (co-edited by D. Bernot, M.-A. Martin and M. Zaini-Lajoubert).
- Les Réfugiés originaires de l’Asie du Sud-Est: rapport au Président de la République, Paris, La Documentation française, 2 vol. 1982–1984 (CeDRASEMI collective report, edited in collaboration with R. Pottier, duplicated in 1981).
- Formes extrêmes de dépendance: contributions à l’étude de l’esclavage en Asie du Sud- Est, Paris, EHESS, 1998 (co-edited with M.-A. Martin and J. Ivanof).

=== Filmography ===
- Sar Luk: les travaux et les jours d’un village mnong gar du Vietnam central, film directed by Georges Condominas and Aiain Bedos based on photos, sung poems collected between 1948 and 1950, and music recorded in 1958 and 1984 (English version translated by Maria Pilar Luna-Magannon).
- [Sar Luk: toils and days of a Mnong Gar village in Central Vietnam: [synopsis], transl. by Maria Pilar Luna-Magannon, film, CNRS-CeDRASEMI, 1984, 14 ff. dact.]
- L’Exotique est quotidien: retour à Sar Luk, directed by Jean Lallier, 16:9 digital telefilm, 16:9 satellite broadcast by France Télévision, VHS videocassette, 52 min., Paris, ADAV / Europe images, Les Films d’ici, Paris, 1996, broadcast by France 2, 1997.
- Nous avons mangé la forêt..., film directed by par Georges Condominas and Jean Lallier, VHS videocassette, 80 min., Le Vidéographe, Université de Toulouse-Le Mirail / Les Films d’ici co-production, 1999.
- Le Sacrifice du buffle, film directed by Georges Condominas and Jean Lallier, VHS videocassette, 50 min., Le Vidéographe, Université de Toulouse-Le Mirail / Les Films d’ici co-production, 1999.

=== Discography ===
- Musique mnong gar du Vietnam (anthologie de musique proto-indochinoise, vol. 1), Paris, OCORA, 1974, 30 cm LP, text by G. Condominas, 10 p. in French and English, notes and bibliog., 12 black-and-white photos, 1 color photo, 1 map (Musée de l’Homme collection, OCORA OCR 80/ ORTF).
- Vietnam: musique des montagnards, le Chant du Monde, CNR 2741085.86, 1997 (Collections of the CNRS and the Musée de l’Homme) [CDI, Jörai (1), Lac (14, 15, 16); CDII, Khmu, 1973 (19, 20, 21)].
