= Challenges (magazine) =

Weekly business magazine published in France

- Categories: Business magazine
- Frequency: Weekly
- Circulation: 183,233 (2020)
- Publisher: Regie OBS
- Founded: 1982; 43 years ago
- Company: Le Nouvel Observateur Group
- Country: France
- Based in: Paris
- Language: French
- Website: Challenges
- ISSN: 0751-4417
- OCLC: 421639665

Challenges is a weekly business magazine headquartered in Paris, France. It is owned by Claude Perdriel (60%) and Bernard Arnault (40%) via their groups Presse Perdriel and LVMH. It has an economic liberal editorial stance and supported Emmanuel Macron during the 2017 French presidential election.

== History and profile ==
Challenges was established in 1982. The magazine offers articles on economy and business-related events and on politics and world affairs. It is published weekly on Thursdays. Previously, it was published monthly and then biweekly.

Its motto is Que dit l'économie cette semaine? (French: What does the economy say this week?).

In 1987, Claude Perdriel, owner of Le Nouvel Observateur, bought the monthly magazine and renamed it as Challenges.

Le Nouvel Observateur Group is the owner and publisher of Challenges. The company also owns Le Nouvel Observateur. Former publisher of Challenges was Croque Futur. The magazine is published by Regie OBS.

Challenges was named as the business magazine of the year in France in 2010.

In May 2021, LVMH, headed by Bernard Arnault, took a 40% stake in the magazine, contributing 8 million euros.

== Editorial stance and political position ==
In 2017, as part of the French presidential campaign, several Challenges journalists felt and deplored the fact that their magazine was "rolling for Emmanuel Macron ".

Just before the first round of legislative elections in 2022, an anti-Jean-Luc Mélenchon cover for the magazine imposed by the publication's director, Claude Perdriel, was denounced by the magazine's journalists.

== Circulation ==
In 2001 Challenges had a circulation of 264,000 copies. The circulation of the magazine was 260,020 copies in 2008. It fell to 250,065 copies in 2009 and 232,000 copies in 2010. During the period of 2011-2012 its circulation was 232,430 copies. The circulation of the magazine was 183,233 copies in 2020.

Year	2011	2012	2013	2014	2015	2016	2017	2018	2019
Circulation	231,813	229,024	222,763	208,658	186,968	199,336	201,992	204,872	185,447
