= Philippe Bouvard =

French television and radio presenter (1929–2026)

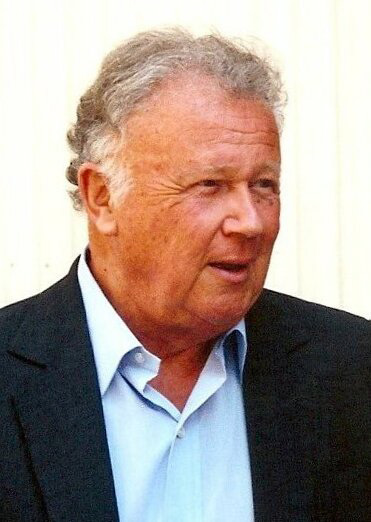
- Bouvard in 2012
- Born: 6 December 1929; Coulommiers, Seine-et-Marne, France
- Died: 24 August 2026 (aged 96); Cannes, France
- Occupations: Television and radio host
- Known for: Les Grosses Têtes, Le Petit Théâtre de Bouvard

Philippe Bouvard (French: [filip buvaʁ]; 6 December 1929 – 24 August 2026) was a French television and radio presenter.

== Career ==
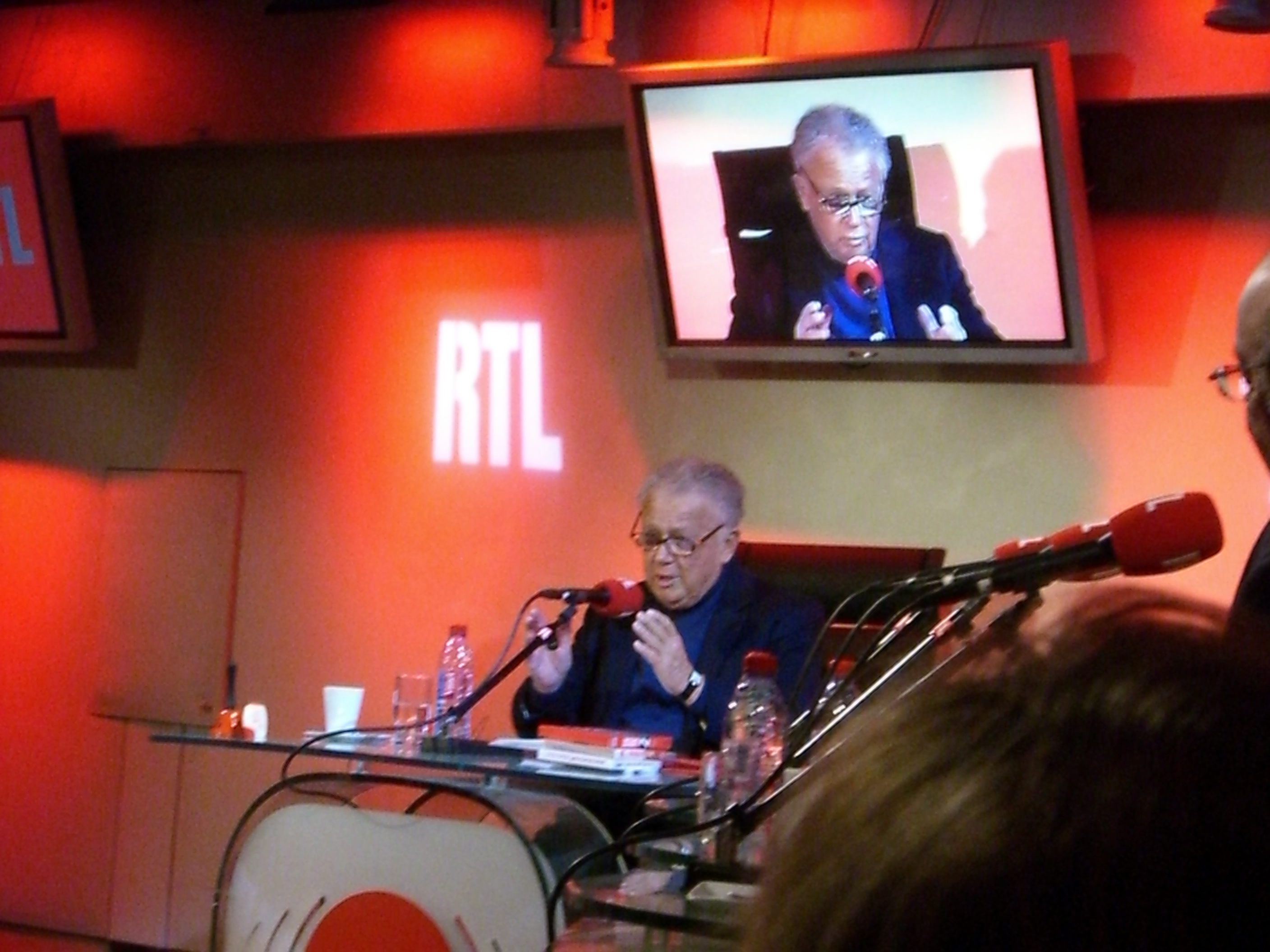
Bouvard in 1989

From 1977 to 2014 Bouvard hosted the French radio program Les Grosses Têtes on RTL (formerly Radio Luxembourg), from 1982 to 1986 he hosted the television program Le Petit Théâtre de Bouvard, and hosted the radio program Allô Bouvard on RTL from 2014 until his retirement in 2025 at age 95, after a career of more than 60 years in radio.

Bouvard holds a world record as "the presenter who has spent the most seasons at one station".

== Death ==
Bouvard died at his home in Cannes, on 24 August 2026, at the age of 96.

== Honours ==
- Knight of the Ordre National du Mérite
- 2005: Knight of the Order of Legion of Honour
- 2014: Commander in the Order of the Crown.
- 2019: Commander of the Ordre des Arts et des Lettres
- Grand Croix of the Order of Isabella the Catholic
- Commander of the Order of the Crown (Belgium)

== Filmography ==
- Vacances explosives (1957) .... François Morel
- The Dirty Game (1965, dialogues)
- A Slightly Pregnant Man (1973) .... Himself
- L'aile ou la cuisse (1976) .... himself as TV presenter

== Books ==
- Un homme libre, 1995
