= Jean-Jacques Augier =

French businessman

Jean-Jacques Augier (born 23 October 1953) is a French publisher and businessman. He previously worked as an inspector of finances, and was treasurer for the 2012 presidential election campaign of previous French president Francois Hollande. Hollande and Augier had been classmates at the École nationale d'administration (ENA). Augier made international headlines in 2013 after an investigation published by The Guardian newspaper and the International Consortium of Investigative Journalists, in the Offshore Leaks report, found that he held substantial offshore holdings in the Cayman Islands, listed under "International Bookstores LTD." His partner in his offshore firm, Xi Shu, is a member of the Chinese People’s Political Consultative Conference. Since January 2013, he is also the owner of French gay magazine Têtu.
