= Claude Perdriel =

French publisher (born 1926)

- Born: 25 October 1926 (age 99); Le Havre, France
- Education: Lycée Janson-de-Sailly
- Alma mater: École Polytechnique
- Occupation: Newspaper publisher
- Spouse: Bénédicte Sourieau
- Children: 6

Claude Perdriel (born 25 October 1926) is owner-manager of the Perdriel Group that publishes Sciences et Avenir, Challenges, Rue89 and during 1970–1980, the Paris daily Le Matin de Paris. It also published Le Nouvel Observateur from its foundation in 1964 to 2014 when it was sold to a group of investors that already published Le Monde.

== Biography ==
Perdriel bought the newspaper France Observateur in 1964 and renamed it Le Nouvel Observateur. In 1973, he launched the magazine Le Sauvage.

In 1987, Perdriel bought the magazine Challenge and renamed it Challenges. In 1999, he launched the magazine Le Nouveau Cinéma.

In December 2017, the French carmaker Renault bought 40% of the Challenges group for €12 million in a move to push partly-owned news content to its system of connected cars. In December, Perdriel bought back Renault's shares in Challenges for €6 million.

In July 2020, Perdriel appeared in a trade court of justice to plead for the annulment of a contractual term signed during his 2015 financial turmoil which established he was legally obligated to retain all the assets of Sophia Publications for at least 10 years. In October 2020, he sold Le Nouveau Magazine Littéraire to Jean-Jacques Augier and Stéphane Chabenat.

== Personal life ==
Claude Perdriel is married with Bénédicte Perdriel (née Sourieau). They have six children: Pauline, Olivier, Louis, Tessa, Vaea et Kim.
