= L'Esprit public =

L'Esprit public was a French political and literary magazine published from 1960 to 1966 that was seen as the unofficial mouthpiece for the Organisation armée secrète during the aftermath of the withdrawal from Algeria.

== History ==
Founded in December 1960 by right-wing nationalist intellectuals united in their opposition to Gaullism, its original editorial board included Jules Monnerot, Jacques Laurent, Philippe Héduy, Jean Brune, Raoul Girardet, André Brissaud, Roland Laudenbach, Philippe Marçais, and Étienne Malnoux (the pseudonym of academic François Natter). Other contributors included Michel Déon, Serge Groussard, Hélie Denoix de Saint Marc, Ahmed Djebbour, Jacques Soustelle, Jean-Marc Varaut, Roger Nimier, Antoine Blondin, Pascal Arrighi, and Marcel Aymé. Among its most active members were European nationalists, neo-pagans, Maurrassians, and supporters of French Algeria, including members of the Organisation armée secrète (OAS). As a result, L'Esprit public was sometimes described as the unofficial mouthpiece of the OAS.

Despite financial difficulties that forced a shift from weekly to monthly publication in 1961, its circulation initially ranged between 20,000 and 30,000 copies. In 1963, Jean Mabire created the Jeunes de l'Esprit public (JEP), whose manifesto adopted a pro-European and revolutionary stance. This led to disagreements within the team, with Maurrassians such as Jacques Perret, Jacques Laurent, Roland Laudenbach, Serge Jeanneret, Raoul Girardet, Francine Dessaigne, and Jean Brune leaving the magazine.

L'Esprit public launched several initiatives, including Éditions de l'esprit nouveau and the Rassemblement de l'Esprit public (REP), a more political movement that became one of the main political vehicles of the OAS. The REP's honorary president was Saïd Boualam, founder of the Front Algérie française, supported by Philippe Héduy and Hubert Bassot. While not particularly active in the Paris region, the REP gained recognition in the provinces, notably through its Toulouse branch led by figures like Bernard Antony. In Marseille, the REP supported the anti-Gaullist right-wing candidacy of Hubert Bassot during the municipal elections of March 1965, securing 22,000 votes.

During the 1965 French presidential election, L'Esprit public initially supported nationalist lawyer Jean-Louis Tixier-Vignancour. However, as it became apparent that Tixier was unlikely to effectively challenge Charles de Gaulle, the magazine's team fractured, and most collaborators departed. The remaining staff ultimately backed centrist candidate Jean Lecanuet, who promised amnesty for French Algeria supporters. The magazine briefly returned to weekly publication, listing its departing members under the heading "This is only a goodbye," but ceased operations in February 1966 after rallying to Lecanuet's Centre démocrate.
