= La Revue Universelle =

La Revue universelle
- Editor: Henri Massis
- Categories: Politics, Royalism
- Frequency: Biweekly
- Founder: Jacques Bainville, Henri Massis
- First issue: April 1, 1920
- Final issue: August 1, 1944
- Country: France
- Based in: Paris
- Language: French

La Revue universelle was a French periodical published in Paris from 1920 to 1944. It was founded by Jacques Bainville (director) and Henri Massis (editor-in-chief) following the publication of the manifesto "Pour un parti de l'intelligence" in Le Figaro on July 19, 1919. The journal's program aimed to "unite all who, worldwide, take a stand against destruction, fortify and expand relationships between groups dedicated to the cause of the mind."

An earlier publication under the same name was issued by Éditions Larousse between 1901 and 1905, directed by Georges Moreau (1853–1934).

== First Series: 1920–1940 ==
Founded in 1920, La Revue universelle was a nationalist journal (royalist and Catholic) with an editorial line close to that of L'Action française. Contributors included Charles Benoist, Marie de Roux, Robert Havard de La Montagne, René Johannet, Georges Valois, Firmin Bacconnier, Pierre-Antoine Cousteau, Georges Gaudy, Gustave Thibon, Pierre Gaxotte, Claude Roy, and Gonzague de Reynold. The journal had a particular interest in foreign policy.

In addition to its founders, major contributors included Jacques Maritain (philosophy), Charles Maurras, Maurice Vaussard, and Henri Gouhier. Its art, literature, and philosophy sections, written by Léon Daudet, Thierry Maulnier, André Rousseaux, and Robert Brasillach, were highly regarded. Its political articles reflected the policies of Action française.

During the 1930s, the journal supported authoritarian regimes, particularly António de Oliveira Salazar in Portugal (especially under Massis's authorship). However, from 1930 onward, it campaigned against German rearmament, the resurgence of Germanism, and the rise of Nazism, making it one of the first significant publications to denounce Hitlerism and warn of the unpreparedness of democracies for an inevitable conflict with Germany.

After Bainville's death in 1936, the journal increasingly aligned with Action française, advocating for the preemptive occupation of the Rhineland, an alliance with Italy, and continuous rearmament policies.

In his Histoire de la littérature française, Kléber Haedens wrote: "La Revue universelle was more interested in history and politics than in literature."

== Second Series: 1941–1944 ==
Weakened by the French defeat, the journal relocated to Vichy in January 1941, supporting Philippe Pétain and opposing the French Resistance. It aligned with the Vichy regime's positions.

New contributors included Pierre Boutang, Raoul Girardet, and Jean Arfel (known as Jean Madiran). The journal ceased publication at the Liberation of France in August 1944. The final issue (no. 86–87) featured an editorial supporting Pétain.

== Third Series: 1974–2005 ==
Renamed Revue universelle des faits et des idées in 1974 under the direction of Étienne Malnoux (François Natter), contributors included René Pillorget, Pierre Pujo, René Sédillot, Georges Soutou, and Georges-Paul Wagner.

== Fourth Series: 2005– ==
In 2005, following Natter's death, Hilaire de Crémiers revived the journal under the name Nouvelle Revue Universelle. Notable contributors included Gérard Leclerc, Michel Mourlet, François-Georges Dreyfus, and Péroncel-Hugoz. The current editor-in-chief, Christian Franchet d'Espèrey, has overseen the journal since 2013.
