= Jean de Fabrègues =

French journalist (1906–1983)

- Born: Jean d'Azémar de Fabrègues; 8 January 1906; Paris, France
- Died: 23 November 1983 (aged 77)
- Occupation: Journalist

Jean d'Azémar de Fabrègues (French pronunciation: [ʒɑ̃ dazemaʁ də fabʁɛɡ]; 8 January 1906 – 23 November 1983) was a French Catholic intellectual and journalist. He was a "traditional" Catholic, rejecting the materialism of both liberal democracy and the totalitarian regimes of the right and the left.

== Early years (1906–39) ==
Jean d'Azémar de Fabrègues was born on 8 January 1906 in Paris. His parents were Raymond d'Azémar de Fabrègues (1865–1944) and Marie Louise Dufour. He attended the Sorbonne but did not complete his studies. He obtained a Bachelor's degree and a diploma of graduate studies in philosophy, and became a university teacher in 1930. He married Monique Mignot.

Fabrègues joined the right wing and royalist Action Française and was the secretary of Charles Maurras, but moved from there to a "traditionalist" catholicism. Fabrègues contributed to several right-leaning journals in the 1930s including La Gazette française of the Action Française (1924–30), Réaction (1930–32) Revue du Siècle (1933–34), Revue du XXe siècle (1934–35) and Combat (1936–39). Combat (Struggle) was an extreme right magazine that Fabrègues coedited with Thierry Maulnier, who was also disgusted by the decadence of the era. Fabrègues was given leave from teaching in 1937, and became director of the journal Civilization and of the éditions Masson collections of classics for schools from 1937 to 1939.

In the 1930s Jean de Fabrègues was at the center of the Young Catholic Right, a group that lost direction when the Pope condemned the Action Française. They followed the views of people such as Jacques Maritain, Georges Bernanos, Henri Massis, Étienne Gilson, François Mauriac and Gabriel Marcel. The 1930s nonconformists, as Jean-Louis Loubet del Bayle\ has called them, were opposed to the materialism of the liberals and the Marxists. They opposed both parliamentary democracy and the totalitarian communist, fascist and Nazi regimes.

== World War II (1939–45) ==
After the defeat of France in 1940 Fabrègues and others including Jean Daujat, Jean Guitton, Henri Guitton, Gustave Thibon and François Perroux supported the Vichy regime's National Revolution, which they hoped would introduce a Christian social order. The German occupation and the evolution of the Vichy regime disappointed them without making them abandon their views.

At the start of the German occupation of France Roland Laudenbach co-edited the literary review Prétexte with Jean Turlais and François Sentein. Prétexte was replaced by Cahiers de la génération in 1941, and its team became the core of the Cahiers français published by the Vichy youth organization. The Cahiers français attracted nonconformists of the 1930s such as Louis Salleron, Jean de Fabrègues, René Vincent and Pierre Andreu, and followers of Charles Maurras such as Raoul Girardet, Antoine Blondin and Jean Turlais. Fabrègues was director of the Lyon-based weekly Demain from 1942 to 1944.

== Later career (1945–83) ==
Fabrègues was appointed editor in chief of the weekly La France catholique in 1945. In March 1957 Fabrègues became director of France catholique, replacing Jean Le Cour Grandmaison (1883–1974). He was director of this journal until 1970. Jean de Fabrègues died in a car crash on 23 November 1983 at the age of 77. He was a knight of the Legion of Honour.

== Works ==
Fabrègues was the author of many books.

- La Cité Antique, Union des corporations françaises, 1927
- L'erreur communiste, Union des corporations françaises, 1929
- Raison de craindre, raison d'espérer, Le Portulan, ????
- Le problème du mal dans la littérature contemporaine, in Le Mal est parmi nous, ouvrage collectif, Plon, 1948
- Les catholiques et la révolution de 1848, in L'esprit de 1848, ouvrage collectif, Bader Dufour, 1948
- Avec notre temps, oui, mais pour le sauver, Alsatia, 1951
- La tyrannie ou la paix, Calmann-Lévy, 1953
- L'apôtre du siècle désespéré, Jean-Marie Vianney, Curé d'Ars, Amiot Dumont, 1956
- La révolution ou la foi, Desclée, 1957
- Le mariage chrétien, Fayard, 1958
- La femme pauvre de Léon Bloy, Club du livre du mois, 1957
- La conversion d'Edith Stein, patronne de l'existentialisme, Wësmael-Charlier, 1963
- Bernanos tel qu'il était, Mame, 1963
- Le sillon de Marc Sangnier, Perrin, 1964
- Chrétiens de droite ou de gauche, Dialogue entre Jean de Fabrègues et Jacques Madaule, Beauchesnes, 1966
- Charles Maurras et son Action française, Perrin, 1966
- Christianisme et civilisation, Gigord, 1966
- L'église, esclave ou espoir du monde ?, Aubier-Montaigne, 1971
- Mauriac, Plon, 1971
- L'apôtre du siècle désespéré, Jean-Marie Vianney, Curé d'Ars, ré-édition France catholique, 2010

== Sources ==
- Auzépy-Chavagnac, Véronique (2002), Jean De Fabrègues et la jeune droite catholique (in French), preface by René Rémond, Presses Universitaires du Septentrion, ISBN 2859397744
- Fabrègues, Jean de (in French), SciencesPo
- Fontan-Moret, Valentin (4 April 2017), "Les non-conformistes des années 30, précurseurs ou prophètes de malheur ?", philitt (in French)
- Gros, Guillaume (2012-10-31), "Rolland Laudenback et La Table ronde, Jacques Perret et Aspects de la France", Maurrassisme et littérature: L'Action française. Culture, société, politique (IV) (in French), Presses Univ. Septentrion, ISBN 978-2-7574-0401-0
- "Nouvelles Religieuses", Le Monde (in French), 13 March 1957
- Pierfit, Jean d'AZÉMAR de FABRÈGUES (in French)
- Pucheu, René (20 August 2009), "L'Étonnant Jean de Fabrègues", La France Catholique
- Sanos, Sandrine (2012-10-24), The Aesthetics of Hate: Far-Right Intellectuals, Antisemitism, and Gender in 1930s France, Stanford University Press, ISBN 978-0-8047-8283-8
