= Bab al-Khamis (Tlemcen) =

Gate in Tlemcen, Algeria

- باب الخميس
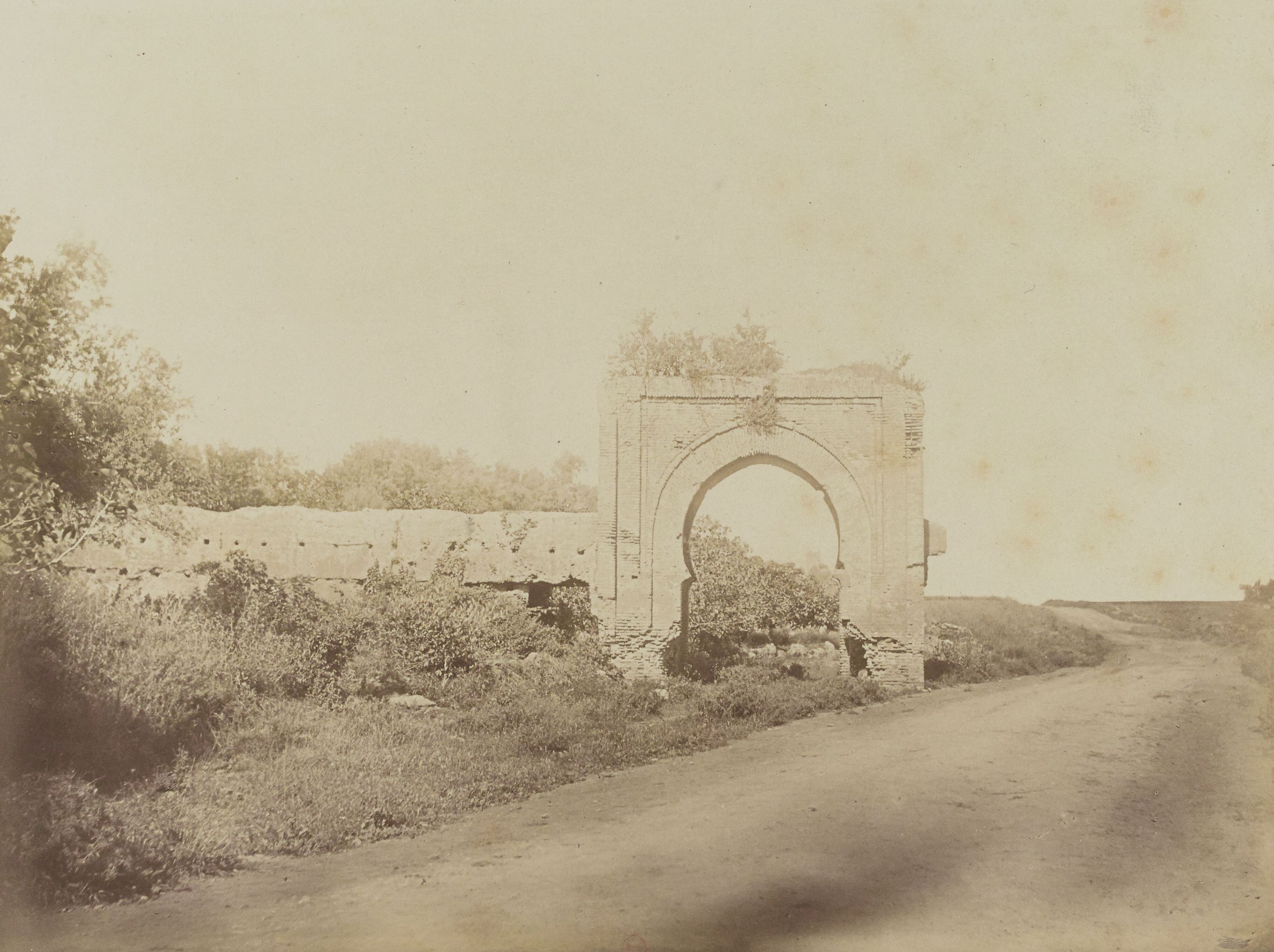
- Bab al-Khamis
- Interactive map of the Bab al-Khamis area

General information
- Type: city gate
- Location: Tlemcen, Algeria
- Coordinates: 34°52′26.86″N 1°19′29.25″W

Bab al-Khemis (Arabic: باب الخميس, romanized: Bāb al-Ḫamīs, lit. 'gate of Thursday') is a historical city gate in the old medina of Tlemcen, Algeria.

== Name ==
The name "Bab al-Khemis" translates to "Thursday Gate." This name is common among fortified cities in the Arab world, often referring to a weekly market that was held outside the gate on Thursdays.

== Location ==
The gate is positioned directly below the Musalla of Mansourah (small mosque), to the left of the historical road connecting Tlemcen to Maghnia. It stands approximately 500 meters in front of the main enclosure of the Mansourah fortress.

== History ==
Bab al-Khemis was constructed in 1310. The gate dates from the period of the Zayyanid dynasty, when Tlemcen served as the capital of the Zayyanid Kingdom and was a center for trade and culture, comparable to Granada due to its Andalusian influences. The city's strategic location made it a vital point along trade routes connecting the Sahara to Europe.

According to the early 20th-century French scholars William and Georges Marçais, the gate stands as one of the notable Arab monuments of Tlemcen.
