= Roland Laudenbach =

French writer

- Born: 20 October 1921; Paris, France
- Died: 9 January 1991 (aged 69); Paris, France
- Occupation: Writer

Roland Laudenbach (20 October 1921 – 9 January 1991) was a French writer, editor, journalist, literary critic and scenarist. He had right-wing political beliefs aligned with the Action Française. After World War II he supported keeping Algeria part of France and saw the 1962 recognition of Algerian independence as a betrayal of the people by Christian and Socialist leaders. He edited or contributed to various literary and political magazines, wrote several novels, and wrote scripts and screenplays for numerous films.

== Career ==
=== Early years (1921–39) ===
Roland Laudenbach was born on 20 October 1921 in Paris. His family was Protestant. His parents were Henri Laudenbach (8 July 1895 – 7 February 1960) and Lucette Mirman (1 March 1893 – 31 December 1987). His paternal grandfather, Léon Mirman, was a friend of Charles Maurras of the Action Française. The actor Pierre Fresnay was his uncle.

=== World War II (1939–45) ===
Laudenbach was influenced by the Action Française, and was very close to Antoine Blondin during World War II (1939–45). He became a literary, theatre and cinema critic, and an outspoken political journalist. At the start of the German occupation of France he co-edited the literary review Prétexte with Jean Turlais and François Sentein, and was associated with the theater company "Le Rideau des jeunes" led by Pierre Franck, whom he had met through Jean Cocteau. Prétexte was replaced by Cahiers de la génération in 1941, and its team became the core of the Cahiers français published by the Vichy youth organization. The Cahiers français attracted nonconformists of the 1930s such as Louis Salleron, Jean de Fabrègues, René Vincent and Pierre Andreu, and followers of Maurras such as François Sentein, Raoul Girardet, Antoine Blondin, Jean Turlais and Roland Laudenbach.

On 31 May 1943 Laudenbach married Hélène Reverdy (3 March 1921 – 2 March 2000). In July 1944 he was named literary director of éditions du Centre. The first issue of Cahiers de La Table Ronde appeared in December 1944. In February 1945 éditions du Centre became éditions de La Table Ronde.

=== Post-war career (1945–91) ===
Laudenbach began running La Table Ronde in 1945, a publishing company that originated in the Vichy era Cahiers de la Table de Ronde, the organ of a community organization associated with the right-wing Action Française. Laudenbach gained the support of the "Hussards", a movement of right-wing intellectuals who attacked existentialism and its mouthpiece Les Temps modernes. He was also a journalist, writing under the pen-name Michel Braspart, and in 1951 published the novel La Mauvaise carte about Algeria. He was opposed to giving Algeria independence and used La Table Ronde to attack the ideas of General Charles de Gaulle.

A new Protestant newspaper, Tant qu'il fait jour was launched in June 1958 in response to the May 1958 crisis in France caused by an unsuccessful coup attempt in Algeria. Laudenbach was one of the contributors. He published an open letter to the Protestant editor Albert Finet on the front page of the new journal saying he and his colleagues were not competing with Finet's established weekly Réforme, but would speak more openly than they could in that journal. He wrote, "You are essentially liberal and it is precisely this liberalism (or the direction that it takes in your columns) that does not suit us."

The first edition of the monthly magazine L'Esprit public (The Public Spirit) appeared on 17 December 1960 with an editorial board composed of Raoul Girardet, Jean Brune, Roland Laudenbach and Jules Monnerot. They were joined by Philippe Héduy and the Algerian deputies Philippe Marçais and Marc Lauriol and were supported by military officers opposed to Algerian independence who had to remain anonymous. The Action Psychologique et Propagande (APP) was the branch of the anti-independence OAS (Organisation armée secrète) charged with popularizing its activities. Jean-Jacques Susini was in charge, supported by Charles Micheletti in Algeria and in metropolitan France by lieutenant Jacques Chadeyron. In the summer of 1961 Laudenbach accepted a senior position in the APP.

The Évian Accords of March 1962 ended the Algerian War and recognized Algeria's independence. Laudenbach wrote that the agreement showed the total bankruptcy of the liberal and left-wing thinkers in France, for which both Christians and Socialists were to blame. The Socialists had abandoned the common people of Algiers and Oran, who had supported the French Section of the Workers' International (SFIO) as much as the people of metropolitan France. The journal Accent grave (revue de l'Occident) was launched in 1963 and ran to less than a dozen issues. It included Paul Sérant, Pierre Andreu, Michel Déon, Roland Laudenbach and Philippe Héduy on its board. The journal followed the ideas of Charles Maurras and had the theme of the crisis of western civilization.

Laudenbach divorced his first wife on 12 November 1969. On 12 March 1970 he married Huguette du Vivier de Fay Solignac (born 2 May 1928). Roland Laudenbach died on 9 January 1991 in Paris.

== Films ==
Year	Film	Contribution
1951	Le Voyage en Amérique (Trip to America)	writer with Henri Lavorel
1952	La Minute de vérité (The Moment of Truth)	writer with Jean Delannoy, Henri Jeanson and Robert Thoeren
1953	Good Lord Without Confession	writer
1953	Napoleon Road	writer
1953	La voce del silenzio (Voice of Silence)	writer
1954	The Count of Bragelonne	writer (uncredited) with Alexandre Astruc
1954	Obsession	writer with Jean Delannoy, Antoine Blondin and Gian Luigi Rondi
1954	Secrets d'alcôve (The Bed)	screenplay - segment "Lit de la Pompadour, Le"
1954	Le défroqué (The Unfrocked One)	dialogue
1955	Bad Liaisons	scenario, dialogue and adaptation with Alexandre Astruc
1955	Les aristocrates (The Aristocrats)	writer, producer
1955	Les évadés (The Fugitives)	producer
1956	L'homme aux clefs d'or	writer
1956	The Wages of Sin	writer
1958	Le insaziabili / Tant d'amour perdu	adaptation / dialogue with Léo Joannon
1958	Une vie (One Life or End of Desire)	screenplay with Alexandre Astruc
1958	Et ta soeur (And Your Sister?)	dialogue, producer
1958	Le piège (No Escape)	writer
1958	Thérèse Étienne	screenplay and dialogue
1959	Les yeux de l'amour (Eyes of Love)	writer
1960	La corde raide (Lovers on a Tightrope)	writer
1962	Éducation sentimentale (Sentimental Education)	screenplay with Roger Nimier
1968	Les secrets de la mer rouge (TV Series)	writer
1980	Arsène Lupin joue et perd (TV Mini-Series)	adaptation & dialogue - 6 episodes
1980	Les dossiers de l'écran (TV Series)	writer - 1 episode
1981	Frère Martin (TV Movie)	screenplay

== Publications ==
- Roland Laudenbach (1941), Le Molière du public; suivi de Notes sur le théâtre, preface by Jean Cocteau, Paris: éd. Prétexte
- Roland Laudenbach (1946), Michel Braspart. Le Voyage de Jérôme, Paris: la Table ronde
- Roland Laudenbach (1947), Du Bartas poète chrétien, Neuchâtel & Paris: Delachaux et Niestlé
- Roland Laudenbach (1948), Michel Braspart. Le Divertissement, Paris: A. Michel
- Roland Laudenbach; Albert-Marie Schmidt; Raoul Stéphan (1948), Protestantisme et littérature, Paris: Éditions Je sers
- Roland Laudenbach (1951), Michel Braspart. La Mauvaise carte, Paris: A. Michel
- Roland Laudenbach (1953), La Bretagne, Paris: les Éditions mondiales
- Antoine Blondin; Jean Delannoy; Roland Laudenbach (1953), La Route Napoléon, Paris: la Table ronde
- Jean Anouilh; Roland Laudenbach (1959), La petite Molière, Paris: l'Avant-scène

== Sources ==
- Adams, Geoffrey (1998-05-22), The Call of Conscience: French Protestant Responses to the Algerian War, 1954-1962, Wilfrid Laurier Univ. Press, ISBN 978-0-88920-299-3
- Blanc, Jean-Daniel, "Roland LAUDENBACH", Geneanet (in French)
- Duranton-Crabol, Anne-Marie (1995), Le temps de l'OAS (in French), Editions Complexe, ISBN 978-2-87027-542-9
- Gros, Guillaume (2012-10-31), "Rolland Laudenback et La Table ronde, Jacques Perret et Aspects de la France", Maurrassisme et littérature: L'Action française. Culture, société, politique (IV) (in French), Presses Univ. Septentrion, ISBN 978-2-7574-0401-0
- Leymarie, Michel; Dard, Olivier; Guérin, Jeanyves (2012-10-31), Maurrassisme et littérature: L'Action française. Culture, société, politique (IV), Presses Univ. Septentrion, ISBN 978-2-7574-0401-0
- Morel, Ludovic (2010-06-03), "Thierry Maulnier, soldat maurrassien de l'humanisme", Le Maurrassisme et la culture: L'action française, culture, société, politique (III) (in French), Presses Univ. Septentrion, ISBN 978-2-7574-0147-7
