= Raoul Girardet =

French historian (1917–2013)

- Born: 6 October 1917
- Died: 18 September 2013 (aged 95)
- Occupation: Historian

Raoul Girardet (6 October 1917 – 18 September 2013) was a French historian who specialized in military societies, colonialism and French nationalism. As a young man he was involved with the right-wing Action Française movement. He was not antisemitic, but was passionately nationalistic. During World War II he supported the French Resistance. Later he supported the OAS struggle against giving independence to Algeria.

== Life ==
Girardet was born on 6 October 1917. His father, grandfather, uncle and cousin were career officers, and he was named after an uncle killed in action in September 1914 during World War I. He attended the école Levert in Belleville and then the Lycée Voltaire in the 11th arrondissement of Paris. He was influenced by the work of Péguy. In the 1930s he was involved in the right-wing Action Française. During World War II he studied at the Sorbonne, where he was taught by Pierre Renouvin and Jérôme Carcopino. He passed his agrégation in History, qualifying as a teacher. He did not share the antisemitism of some followers of Maurras and eventually joined the resistance, like many other Action Française sympathizers. He was later awarded the Croix de Guerre 1939–1945 and was made an officer of the Legion of Honour.

At the start of the German occupation of France Roland Laudenbach co-edited the literary review Prétexte with Jean Turlais and François Sentein, and was associated with the theater company "Le Rideau des jeunes" led by Pierre Franck, whom he had met through Jean Cocteau. Prétexte was replaced by Cahiers de la génération in 1941, and its team became the core of the Cahiers français published by the Vichy youth organization. The Cahiers français attracted nonconformists of the 1930s such as Louis Salleron, Jean de Fabrègues, René Vincent and Pierre Andreu, and followers of Charles Maurras such as Raoul Girardet, Antoine Blondin and Jean Turlais.

Raoul Girardet specialized as a historian in military societies, the colonial concept and French nationalism. In 1953, as a teacher at the Lycée Lakanal, he published La Société militaire, which attracted much attention. He was appointed assistant and then assistant master at the Sorbonne. During the Algerian War he remained faithful to the idea of French Algeria, and thought that General Charles de Gaulle had betrayed the people. To some extent he participated in the activities of the OAS in the "Action politique et propagande" branch, along with intellectuals such as François Bluche, Jules Monnerot and Jacques Laurent. He wrote for L'Esprit public, and signed a manifesto affirming the "civilizing mission" of the army in Algeria, along with writers such as Roger Nimier and Henri Massis. In 1961 he was arrested for his activism in favour of the OAS, which resisted giving Algeria independence. His involvement with the OAS earned him an arrest and time in jail.

After this he mainly devoted himself to work on the major themes of nationalism, colonialism and the military question. He became a lecturer and then a professor at the Institut d'études politiques de Paris (IEP) in Paris. In the 1960s he taught a course at the IEP on "The Movement of Political Ideas in Contemporary France" with René Rémond and Jean Touchard, Secretary General of the National Foundation for Political Science. He published reference works on The Military Society in France, French Nationalism and The Colonial Idea in France, And an essay on Myths and Political Mythologies. In 1990 in Singulièrement libre, a book of interviews with the journalist Pierre Assouline, he reasserted his love of his country which led to his participation in the Resistance and is commitment to French Algeria. Girardet died on 18 September 2013 at the age of 95.

== Publications ==
- Raoul Girardet (1943), Les Traditions sociales dans les pays de France, Les Cahiers de la restauration française, publiés sous la direction de Raymond Marin. No 1, Paris: Éditions de la Nouvelle France (Impr. de l'Atelier d'art graphique), p. 198
- Raoul Girardet (1953), La société militaire dans la France contemporaine 1815-1939..., Paris: Plon, p. 333
- Raoul Girardet (1954), "L'Influence de la tradition sur la politique étrangère de la France", Politique étrangère et ses fondements, Paris: A. Colin Fondation nationale des sciences politiques: 143–163
- Raoul Girardet (1956), Histoire, les temps modernes. classe de 4e, Paris: F. Nathan, p. 384
- Raoul Girardet; Pierre Jaillet (1959), Histoire. XVIe, XVIIe et XVIIIe siècles. Classe de 3e, Paris: F. Nathan (Tours, impr. Mame), p. 464
- Raoul Girardet (1960), Problèmes généraux de la Défense nationale, Paris: Amicale des élèves de [l'] Institut d'études politiques
- Raoul Girardet (June 1960), "Problèmes militaires contemporains", Revue française de science politique (2), Paris: Centre d'études des relations internationales: 395–418
- Raoul Girardet (1962), Pour le tombeau d'un capitaine, Paris: l'Esprit nouveau : (Impr. Combat et presse de France), p. 54
- Raoul Girardet; Marcel Pacaut (1965), Histoire, la fin du Moyen âge et les temps modernes XIVe-XVe-XVIe-XVIIe siècles, Paris: F. Nathan (impr. G. Lang), p. 353
- Raoul Girardet; André Jardin (1966), Histoire, la naissance du monde contemporain 1715-1870, Paris: F. Nathan, p. 448
- Raoul Girardet (1972), L'Idée coloniale en France de 1871 à 1962, Paris: la Table ronde, p. 337
- Raoul Girardet (1979), Le temps des colonies, Paris: Berger-Levrault, p. 106
- Raoul Girardet (1986), Mythes et mythologies politiques, Paris: Éd. du Seuil, p. 210
- Raoul Girardet; Raymond Huard; Odile Rudelle (1987), La tradition politique, Paris: Presses universitaires de France, p. 202
- Raoul Girardet (1988), Problèmes militaires et stratégiques contemporains, Paris: Dalloz, p. 238
- Raoul Girardet (1990), Mythes et mythologies politiques, Paris: Éd. du Seuil, p. 210
- Pierre Assouline; Raoul Girardet (1990), Singulièrement libre entretiens, Paris: Perrin, p. 226
- Raoul Girardet (1996), Nationalismes et nation, Bruxelles: Éd. Complexe, p. 167
- Raoul Girardet (1998), La société militaire de 1815 à nos jours, Paris: Perrin, p. 341
- Raoul Girardet (2005), L'idée coloniale en France de 1871 à 1962 (Nouv. éd. ed.), Paris: Hachette littératures, p. 506

== Sources ==
- Catinchi, Philippe-Jean (22 September 2013), "Raoul Girardet, historien du sentiment national", Le Monde (in French)
- Gros, Guillaume (31 October 2012), "Rolland Laudenback et La Table ronde, Jacques Perret et Aspects de la France", Maurrassisme et littérature: L'Action française. Culture, société, politique (IV) (in French), Presses Univ. Septentrion, ISBN 978-2-7574-0401-0
- Winock, Michel (26 September 2013), "Mort de Raoul Girardet "Mythes et mythologies politiques"", Huffington Post (in French)
- Saint Victor, Jacques de (22 September 2013), "Raoul Girardet, mort d'un historien engagé", Le Figaro (in French)
