= Maurice Vaussard =

French writer and essayist

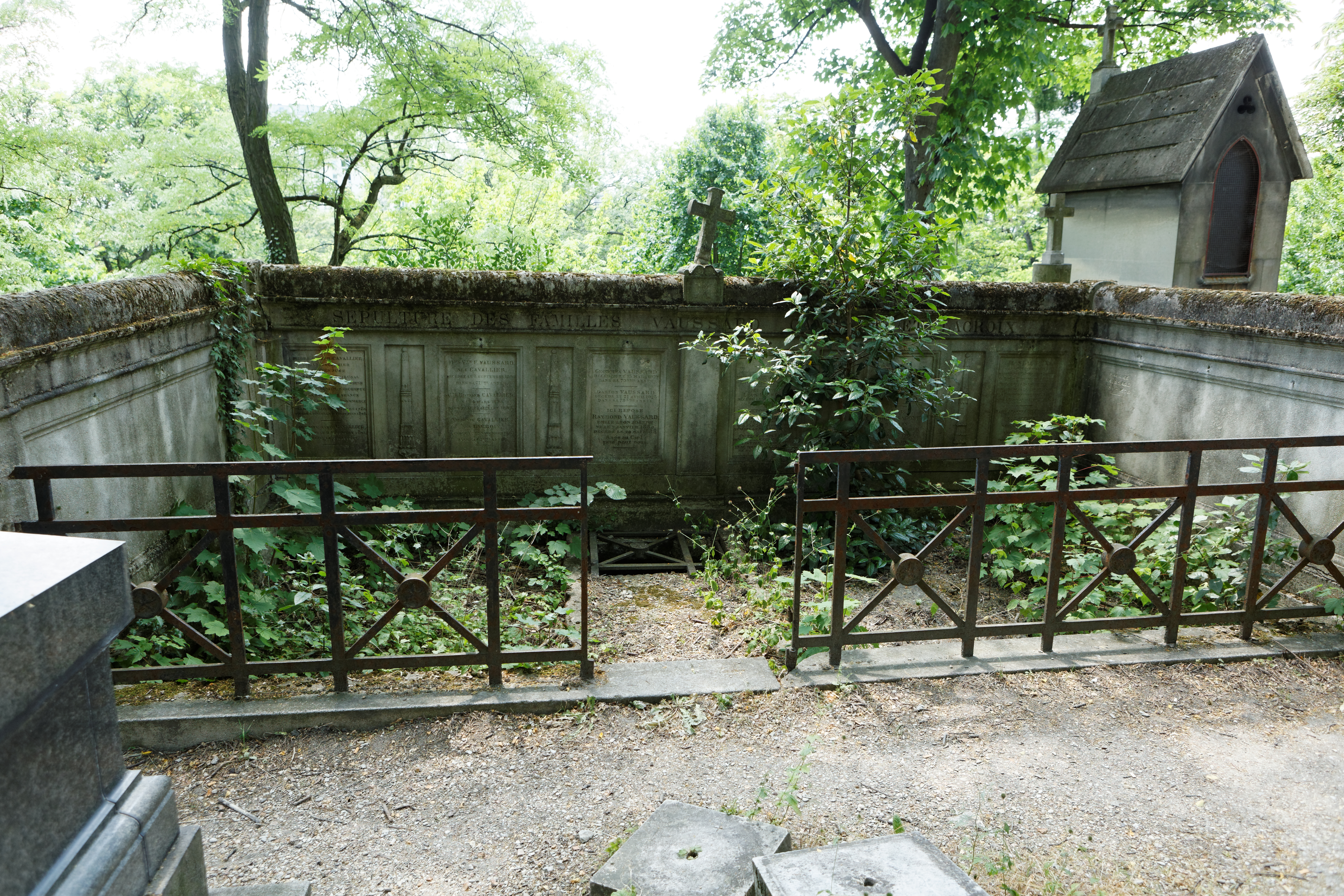
- Grave at Père Lachaise Cemetery.
- Born: 8 September 1888; Ramburelles (Somme)
- Died: 24 February 1978 (aged 89); Paris
- Occupations: Writer; Essayist

Maurice Vaussard (8 September 1888 – 24 February 1978) was a 20th-century French writer and essayist.

Author of numerous historical and political essays, a specialist in Italian history and the Christian Democrats, Maurice Vaussard was editor at the Revue universelle (of Jacques Bainville and Henri Massis) and at Le Monde from 1945 to 1972. He was awarded numerous prizes by the Académie française.

== Prizes ==
- 1922: Prix Bordin for L’intelligence catholique dans l’Italie au XXe siècle
- 1926: Prix Montyon for Sainte Marie-Madeleine de Pazzi (1566–1607)
- 1951: Prix d’Académie for Histoire de l’Italie contemporaine
- 1959: Prix Louis Barthou for ensemble de son œuvre
- 1962: Prix Broquette-Gonin (literature) for ensemble de son œuvre
- 1967: Prix du Rayonnement de la langue et de la littérature françaises
- 1974: Prix de l’Académie for ensemble de ses travaux historiques

He is buried in the 29th division of the Père-Lachaise Cemetery.

== Bibliography ==
- Ilaria Biagioli, Maurice Vaussard. Un cristiano e l'eresia nazionalista, in Cattolicesimo e totalitarismo. Chiese e culture religiose tra le due guerre mondiali (Italia, Spagna, Francia), a cura di Daniele Menozzi e Renato Moro, Brescia, Morcelliana, 2004.
