= Transition from the Medieval Castle to the Early Modern Fortress =

Developments from late 14th to early 16th century

The transition from the medieval castle to the modern fortress represents a major shift in European military architecture, occurring between the late 14th and early 16th centuries in response to advancements in siege technology, particularly the development of effective gunpowder artillery. Medieval castles, which reached their zenith between the 11th and 13th centuries, were typically characterized by tall, relatively thin stone walls, high towers or keeps, and vertically oriented defensive features such as battlements and narrow arrow slits, all designed to repel attackers employing traditional siege engines and scaling tactics. Their defenses often concentrated on isolated points, with gatehouses, moats, and sometimes outer works like barbicans and bastilles to protect vulnerable entrances. With the increasing power and range of cannons, these traditional castles became highly vulnerable to bombardment. The new fortification designs abandoned verticality in favor of expansive, low-profile layouts with extremely thick, sloped masonry walls capable of absorbing or deflecting cannon fire. Towers and bastions were integrated into angular curtain walls to allow for overlapping fields of fire and the elimination of blind spots, while extensive systems of moats, ravelins, and outworks delayed and disrupted enemy advances. While the castle was built to serve as the fortified home of the nobility the fortress became a mere military facility to accommodate garrisons and artillery.

== Development ==
=== Middle Ages ===
The medieval castle, which reached its peak between the 11th and 13th centuries, was based on the principle of vertical alignment. Its main features – thin but high curtain walls, the keep (donjon) and narrow embrasures – were primarily adapted to the siege weapons of the time. The walls were built to withstand bombardment with stone projectiles from a trebuchet and high enough to hinder attackers attempting to storm them.A talus or sloping plinth was added to the foot of the walls to make them thicker and more difficult to breach. The castle concentrated its defences on isolated points (towers), but allowed only limited flank coverage of the walls. The defenders fired vertically downwards, creating blind spots at the foot of the walls. The advent of gunpowder fundamentally changed warfare. The introduction of cannons in the 14th and 15th centuries posed new challenges for medieval castles. The tall, relatively thin walls could no longer withstand the powerful artillery shells and were easily destroyed. This necessitated a fundamental redesign of the fortifications.

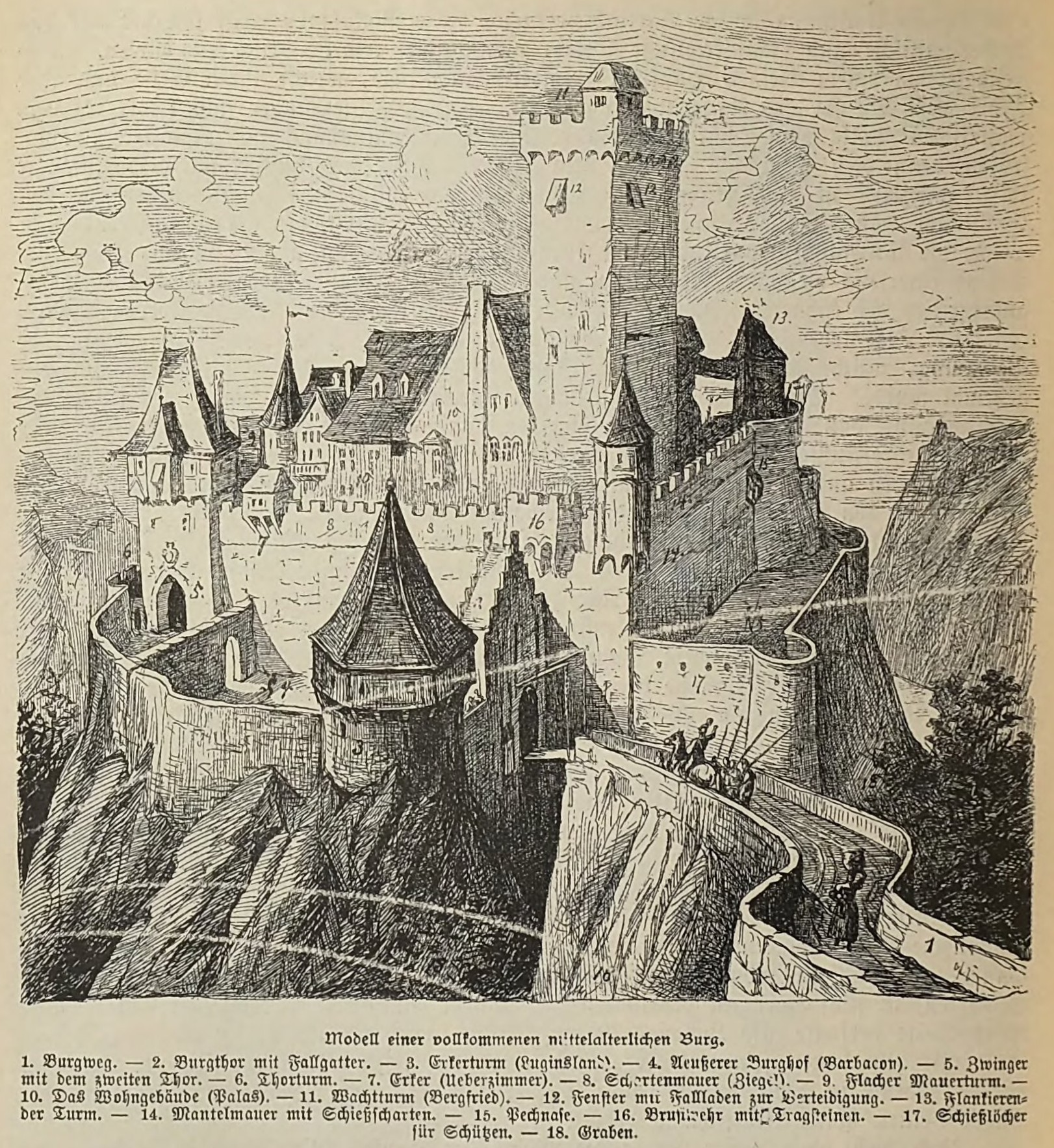
19th-century illustration of an idealised medieval castle. 1. Castle road. 2. Castle gate with portcullis. 3. Oriel tower. 4. Outer castle courtyard (Barbacon). 5. Zwinger with the second gate. 6. Gate tower. 7. Oriel. 8. South wall. 9. Flat wall tower. 10. The residential building (palace). 11. Watchtower (keep). 12. Window with portcullis for defense. 13. Flanking tower. 14. Mantling wall with loopholes. 15. Pitched turret. 16. Breastwork with supporting stones. 17. Shooting holes for archers. 18. Ditch.

In the later Middle Ages, castles saw a series of refinements to their defensive systems, particularly at points of vulnerability such as the gatehouse. Drawbridges were improved through the addition of counterbalancing mechanisms, which made their operation less labor-intensive and increased their effectiveness as barriers. At the same time, moats became deeper, wider, and sometimes doubled, further complicating enemy approaches. To strengthen the outer defenses, structures such as barbicans were adopted and developed, often placed on the far side of the moat to obscure and protect the entrance. The barbican, sometimes a fortified ward or a U-shaped tower, provided an additional line of defense and could be equipped with its own ditch, parapet, and drawbridge. In some cases, the outer works evolved into large bastilles, which functioned almost as independent fortresses, especially at the gates of towns.

By the end of the 14th century, the block-castle emerged as a further innovation, characterized by the elimination of separate outer walls and isolated towers in favor of a massive, integrated core. Towers were incorporated into the main enceinte at the same height, creating a broad terrace that facilitated internal communication and the deployment of both traditional hurling machines and, later, firearms. Such castles, including the Bastille in Paris and Tarascon, represented the last phase of medieval fortification.

Attempts to adapt existing castles for artillery defense included thickening walls and enlarging embrasures for small-caliber guns. However, these modifications were ultimately limited by practical constraints: excessive wall reinforcement reduced usable space, and the narrow tops of medieval walls and towers could not accommodate heavy artillery, which could only be placed atop larger towers. Additionally, the conversion of arrow loops into gun ports restricted the size and effectiveness of the armament. The increasing effectiveness of artillery led to architectural innovations aimed at deflecting or absorbing cannon fire. Two principal methods emerged: attaching wedge-shaped blocks to round towers to facilitate crossfire and deflect direct hits, and sloping or rounding the tops of walls and parapets to present oblique surfaces to incoming projectiles. These forms of "ballistic shaping" were precursors to the more systematic changes that would define the fortress of the early modern period.

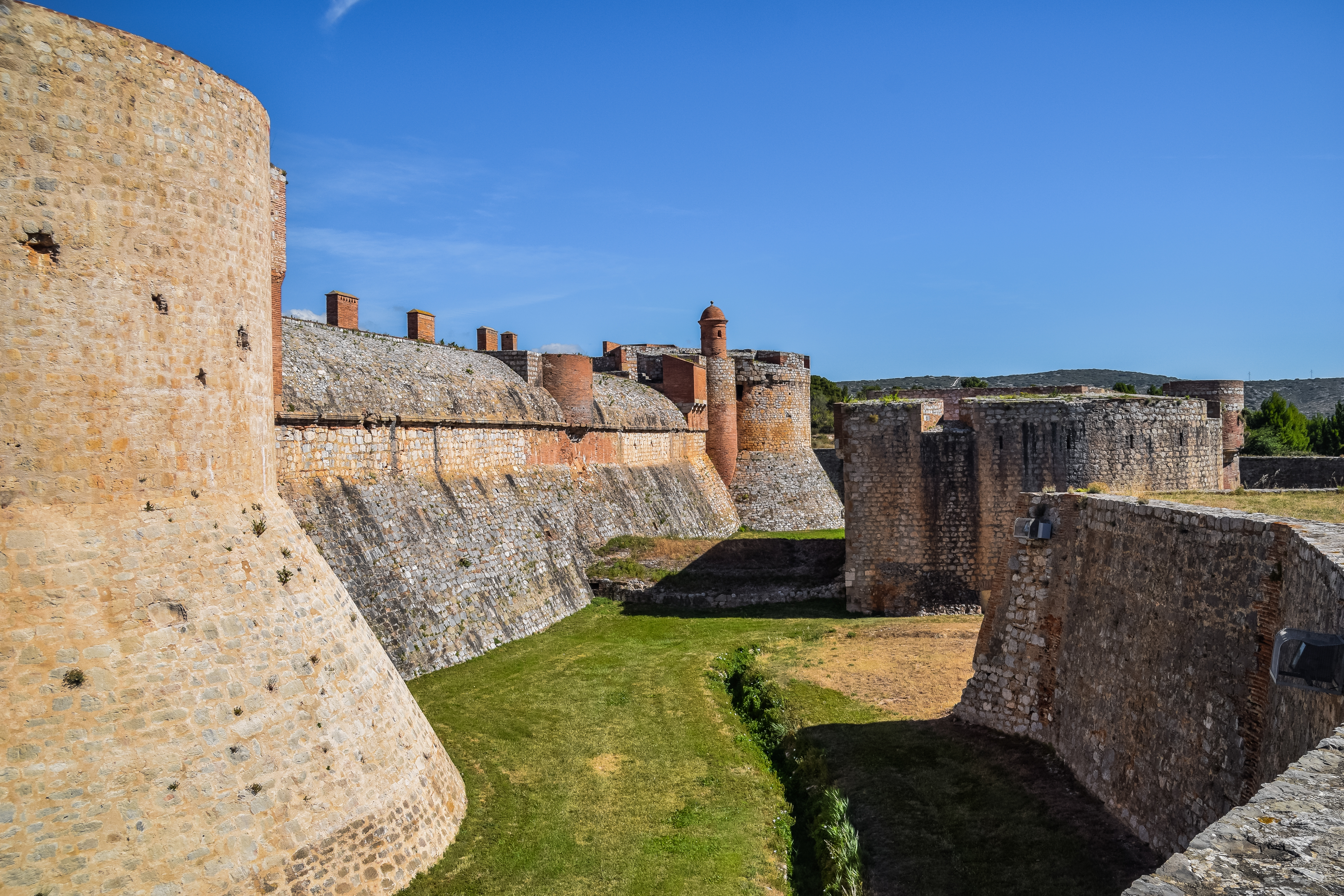
Fortress of Salses marking the transition from medieval castles to modern fortresses.

A key example of this transitional phase is the fort of Salses in France, constructed at the close of the 15th century by the Spanish engineer Ramiro Lopez. Salses was conceived for horizontal, rather than vertical, defense and incorporated design features specifically adapted to withstand artillery assault. The fort employed massive drum towers with artillery ports for enfilading fire, heavily reinforced walls with battered lower sections, and a wide, deep moat capable of being flooded. After suffering damage in an early siege, the walls were thickened even further, and ravelins were added to strengthen the outer defenses. The internal layout included arcaded galleries, counter-mine tunnels, and extensive provisions for a large garrison, marking a clear departure from the design and function of medieval castles.

=== Early Modern Period ===
During the mid-16th century, the art and science of fortification reached a point of synthesis between practical military engineering and theoretical principles, marking it as a true “art of war.” This period saw a remarkable volume of both construction and theoretical writing, particularly by Italians, who dominated the field with their publications and engineering expertise. Italian innovations were initially at the forefront, with the transformation of medieval fortifications to withstand firearms. This was achieved by thickening curtain walls, redesigning them into regular polygons, and creating bastions—angled projections that allowed defenders to direct flanking fire along the walls. These fortifications incorporated raised structures known as cavaliers, which further enhanced defensive firepower.

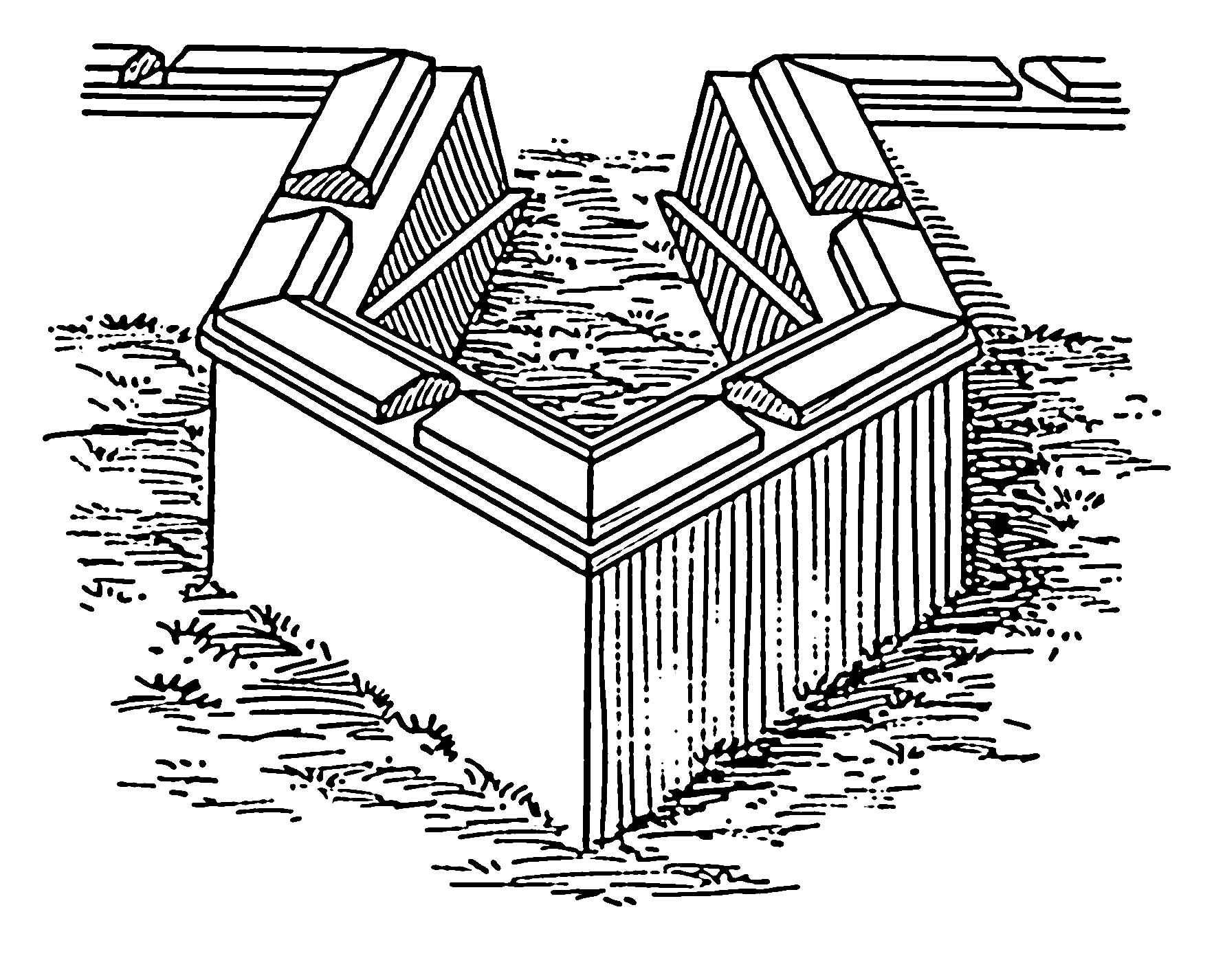
The main defensive components of a bastion were the faces, which met at the salient to absorb enemy fire, and the flanks, which used the scarp wall to provide enfilade fire into the moat, preventing close approach. The connecting curtain wall featured wide ramps and wall-walks for artillery placement, while the parapet with its banquette provided infantry firing positions and separated the bastion from the open gorge.

Over time, the leadership in fortification design shifted from the Italians to the Germans and Dutch, especially under the influence of Daniel Speckle and Simon Stevin. The northern European approach made fortifications more aggressive, extending defensive works further from the main walls, increasing firepower, and emphasizing the size and importance of bastions over the curtain wall. The ideal trace remained the regular polygon, but the profile of the defenses was kept low and concealed behind glacis—sloping banks that shielded the base of the walls from direct fire. Subsidiary works, often variants of the ravelin (a triangular outwork), projected outward to deter attackers, prevent concentrated assaults, and force besiegers to spread their forces thinly and advance slowly. This style of defense was conceived as a kind of static counterattack, with each element of the fortification designed to support its neighbors, creating overlapping fields of fire and making every ditch and bastion mutually protective.

Stevin emphasized the principle that the main purpose of fortification was to “cleanse” the ground around the fortress of enemies by means of coordinated and comprehensive fire. While the northern systems were advanced and required meticulous planning and surveying, the simpler Italian system remained widely used because of its practicality and adaptability. Italian engineers and their methods achieved international prominence, their designs spreading across Europe and overseas to places such as Malta, Antwerp, Palmanova, Havana, Goa, and Macao. The Italian bastioned system, with its polygonal and bastioned traces, became a recognizable international standard.

The period was marked by extensive fortification programs, particularly in areas threatened by Ottoman expansion and along contested frontiers in Europe and colonial holdings. Building and maintaining these fortifications required significant resources, including land acquisition, construction, armament, and the upkeep of garrisons. The new fortifications restored the advantage to the defender after a period in which artillery had rendered older walls obsolete. No city, however, could withstand a determined siege indefinitely, but the new systems forced besiegers to undertake protracted and complex operations, often involving expert engineers to design attack trenches and siege batteries.

Siege warfare itself became increasingly sophisticated, with a focus on systematically reducing fortifications by battering vulnerable points and suppressing defensive fire. Notable sieges, such as Parma’s attack on Antwerp, demonstrated both the ingenuity of military engineers and the importance of controlling the surrounding landscape, as well as the logistical challenges faced by attackers. The crisis in fortification brought on by the rise of gunpowder weaponry was ultimately resolved by Italian innovations, particularly the bastion and the bastioned system. The bastion, developed in early 16th-century Italy, represented a fundamental change in military architecture. Unlike earlier towers, it featured a low, thick earthen rampart faced with masonry to absorb cannon fire and a pentagonal ground plan that projected outward from the fortress. This allowed for effective flanking fire along the walls and eliminated blind spots. Bastions often included orillons—curved or angular screens that protected defenders from enfilading fire and permitted coverage of the ditch.

The typical Italian bastioned system replaced medieval towers with bastions at the corners of curtain walls, making direct assault extremely hazardous. Further developments included the cavalier, a raised platform providing additional firepower and observation, and the Venetian bastioned system, which sometimes placed cavaliers in the middle of the curtain. The new Italian bastioned front, the result of experimentation by engineers such as Castriotto, Maggi, and de Marchi, maximized defensive fire coverage and minimized blind spots. The addition of the ravelin and the covered way—the latter being a lane atop the counterscarp, protected by a parapet and aligned with the glacis—further strengthened the outer defenses.

Among the earliest fortifications designed with the new Italian style was the Rocca di Sarzanello, constructed between 1493 and 1502 by the engineer Francesco Giamberti. Its layout bore a resemblance to the theoretical plans of Giorgio Martini, featuring two large triangles—one incorporating rounded corner towers and the other shaped as a ravelin—effectively anticipating the later development of bastioned defenses. Another significant example is Forte Sangallo at Civita Castellana, commissioned by Cesare Borgia and built between 1494 and 1497 under the direction of Antonio da Sangallo the Elder. Although it served as a ducal residence, the fortress was purposefully designed to withstand artillery, with a polygonal keep, a perimeter wall reinforced by five artillery towers, and a deep surrounding moat.

== The Adaptation of Italian Fortification Principles Across Europe ==
As the Italian system of fortification spread across Europe, various regions began adapting its principles to fit their own circumstances and needs. Fortifications such as the citadel of Antwerp, the fortress of Navarrenx, and the Citadel of Spandau exhibit this process of adaptation, evolving to address the particular challenges posed by their local conditions. The Low Countries, in particular, became a center for significant innovation in fortification during the sixteenth century. Dutch engineers, well-versed in managing water and recognizing its defensive potential, rapidly assimilated Italian techniques and soon emerged as leading figures in military engineering.

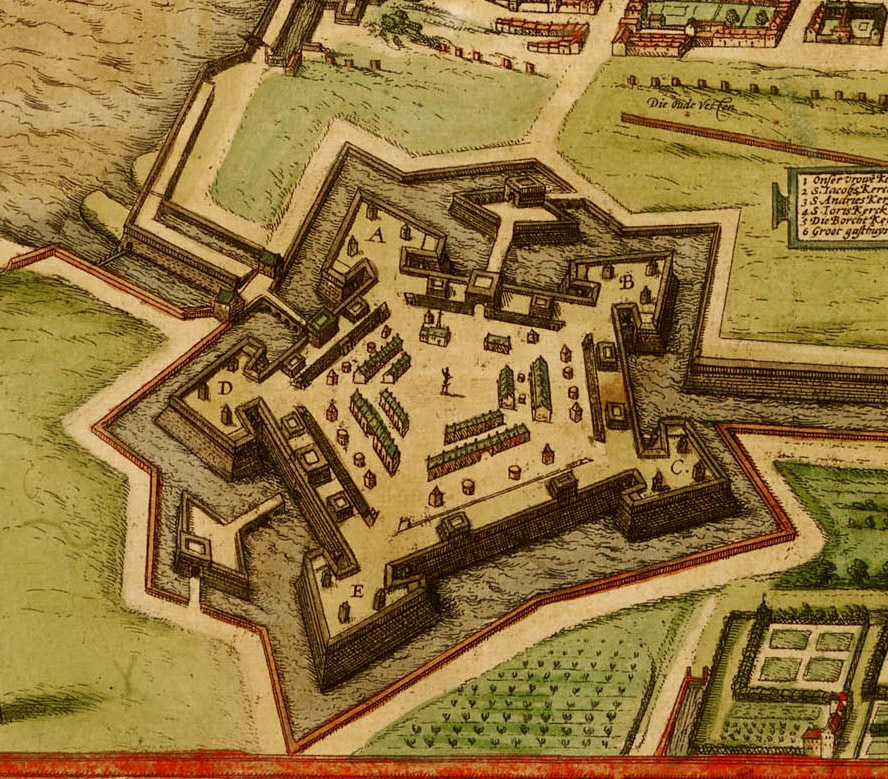
The Citadel of Antwerp, 1572

They exploited their abundant water resources to construct defenses that were not only formidable but also aesthetically striking. Thanks to the preservation efforts of organizations like the Stichting Menno van Coehoorn, a Dutch society dedicated to the study and maintenance of historic fortifications, several of these sites—such as Naarden, Coevorden, Heusden, and Brielle—can still be appreciated today in their near-original form. The transition from medieval to modern fortification in the Low Countries is well illustrated in the plans of Italian engineer Francesco di Marchi, who documented a period of experimentation and hybrid designs. During this phase, the traditional round tower was gradually replaced by the angular bastion, and the use of water as a defensive element was increasingly explored.

At Arnhem, walls were reinforced with half-round towers at the gates and supplemented with two angular bastions reflecting the Italian influence. Delfzijl displayed an unusual layout, partly incorporating bastions and partly defined by irregular angles that resisted standard classification. Enckhuysen ingeniously diverted several rivers into a ditch encircling part of the town and then routed the water inside the walls for greater protection. In Maastricht, the town was enclosed by a wall studded with towers, while a bastioned outwork guarded the main bridge over the river. Despite these local adaptations, it was not until the end of the sixteenth century that a distinctively Dutch school of fortification began to take shape, largely through the influence of Maurice of Nassau, Prince of Orange, who studied under the mathematician and fortress engineer Simon Stevin. The Dutch approach to fortification was characterized by the principle of “wide and low.”

The flat topography of the Netherlands negated the need for high ramparts, as even modest elevations could dominate the surrounding landscape. Nevertheless, constructing even low ramparts and protective glacis required substantial quantities of earth, which were customarily obtained by digging the defensive ditches that surrounded the fortifications. This practical, landscape-driven approach became a hallmark of Dutch military architecture, blending the theoretical foundations of the Italian system with innovative responses to local environmental and tactical realities.

The frequent wars in the Netherlands provided ample opportunity for local engineers to develop and refine new approaches to fortification, but it was the tumultuous political and military climate of France—marked by civil conflicts, the Thirty Years’ War, the Fronde, and the War of the Spanish Succession—that eventually propelled French engineers to the forefront of military architecture. Early French contributions, such as Jacques Perret's 1594 treatise, focused on theoretical and highly symmetrical designs, notable more for their geometric precision than for practical defensive capability. Perret’s plans incorporated bastions and recessed flanks to create orillons or concealed gun platforms, and like many proponents of systematic fortification, he prescribed exact dimensions for every element. However, Perret’s work largely reworked existing ideas rather than offering genuine innovation, and his influence remained mostly theoretical.

A more practical approach was taken by Jean Errard de Bar-le-Duc, a professional engineer who became part of the French Corps of Engineers established by Sully in 1602. Drawing on his firsthand experience in constructing defenses, Errard published a treatise in 1604 that advocated for adapting fortifications to the specific terrain rather than adhering strictly to geometrical systems. He advised that the salient angle of a bastion should fall between sixty and ninety degrees, and that the flank wall should meet the face at a right angle—a recommendation that sparked ongoing debate about the optimal arc of fire for flank-mounted guns. Although Errard was involved in numerous significant fortification projects across France, his works were often temporary and later replaced by other engineers, leaving no surviving examples.

Another important figure, the Chevalier de Ville, combined military experience with a keen awareness of the evolving art of fortification. In his 1628 treatise, he built upon Italian precedents but introduced several practical innovations. De Ville recognized the necessity of keeping bastions within musket range of each other to maximize defensive firepower, and formalized the concept of the "line of fire," a key measurement in the layout of defenses. He also expanded the covered way at its angles into so-called places of arms—spaces where troops could gather for sorties or counterattacks. Rather than insisting on rigid measurements, de Ville emphasized flexibility, allowing each fortress to be tailored to its site.

The evolution of French fortification continued with the work of Blaise Francois Pagan, who reinforced earlier designs by extending defenses outward with ditches, ravelins, and counterguards. He later proposed enveloping the main works in a continuous outer line equipped with three-tier batteries, additional ditches, and more outworks. Pagan even suggested building non-military structures such as stores and hospitals within these outworks, a controversial idea that may have been intended to make the costly construction of extensive defenses more appealing to those funding the work.

The sole surviving example constructed according to Pagan's plans is the castle of Blaye on the Gironde, which has turreted cavaliers, rounded bastion corners, and wide berms. Together, these advancements show how the medieval castle gradually gave way to the modern fortress, fueled by both theoretical breakthroughs and real-world modifications. The work of Vauban, whose mastery and improvement of the bastioned system signaled the final end of the castle era and the fortress's rise to prominence in military construction, was the culmination of this process.

== Bibliography ==
- Brice, Martin Hubert (1985). Stronghold : a History of Military Architecture. New York: Schocken Books. ISBN 0805239383.
- Duffy, Christopher (1979). Siege Warfare: the Fortress in the Early Modern World, 1494-1660. London: Routledge & Kegan Paul. ISBN 071008871X.
- Hale, J.R.; et al. (The New Cambridge Modern History) (2008). "Armies, Navies and the Art of War". In R.B. Wernham (ed.). The Counter-Reformation and Price Revolution, 1559–1610. Vol. III. Cambridge: Cambridge University Press. ISBN 1248391020.
- Hogg, Ian (1981). The history of fortification. New York: St. Martin's Press. ISBN 0312378521.
- Kaufmann, J. E (2001). The Medieval Fortress: Castles, Forts, and Walled Cities of the Middle Ages. Conshohocken, PA: Combined Publishing. ISBN 1580970621.
- Lepage, Jean-Denis (2002). Castles and fortified cities of medieval Europe : an illustrated history. Jefferson, N.C.: McFarland. ISBN 0786410922.
- Viollet-le-Duc, Eugène-Emmanuel (2005) [1860]. Castles and warfare in the Middle Ages. Mineola, N.Y.: Dover Publications. ISBN 0-486-44020-6.
