= Henri Vincent-Anglade =

French painter

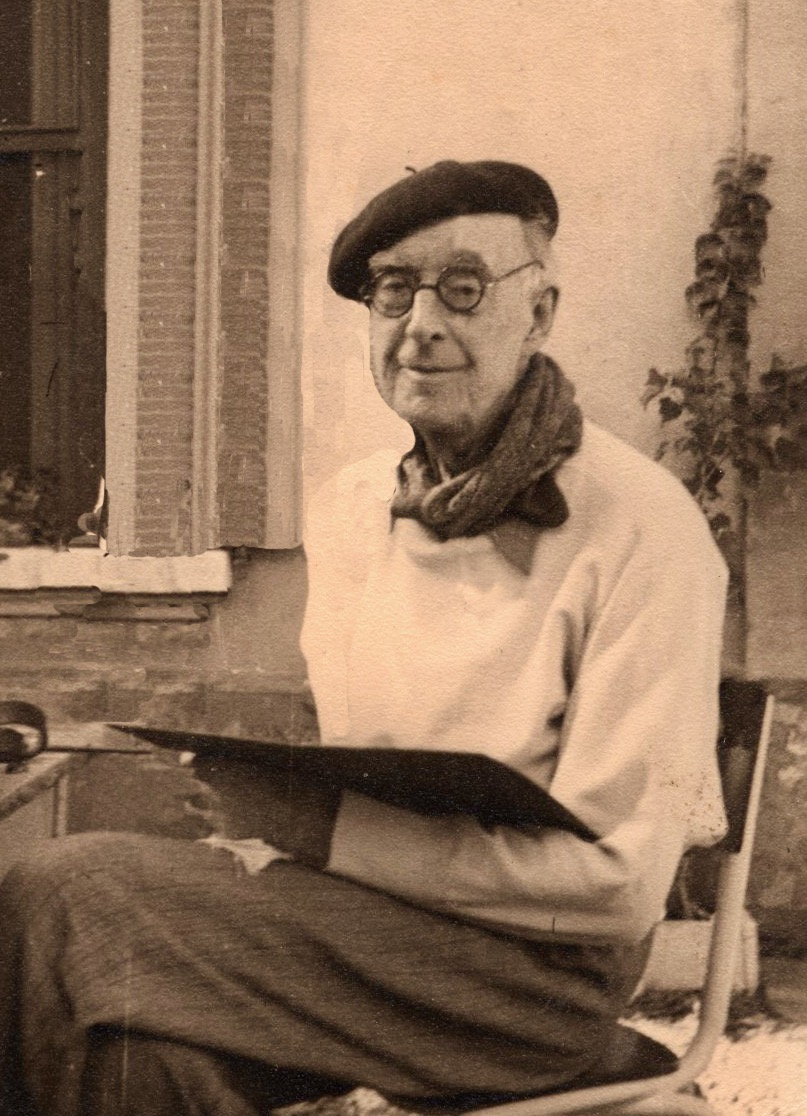
- Henri Vincent-Anglade
- Born: Henri Vincent; May 9, 1876; Bordeaux, France Gironde, Aquitaine, France
- Died: January 25, 1956 (aged 79)
- Education: Ecole des Beaux-Arts
- Known for: Painting
- Awards: 1903

Henri Vincent-Anglade (née Vincent; May 9, 1876 – January 25, 1956) was a French portrait painter and advertising illustrator. He was published in major magazines of the time. He participated in the first exhibition of the City in 1933, and exhibited each year at the Paris Horse Show as well as at the French Salons.

== Early life ==
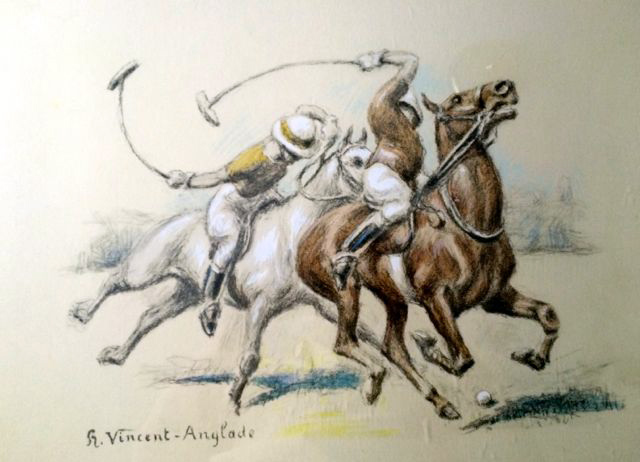
Vincent-Anglade Painting

Anglade was born on May 9, 1876, in Bordeaux, France, the son of Charles Vincent. He added his mother’s surname, Anglade, to his father’s to distinguish himself from his brother, the poster designer René Vincent.

Vincent-Anglade was a pupil of Gustave Moreau, Fernand Corom and Francois Flameng at the Ecole des Beaux-Arts in Paris, and also Amable Pinta.

== Professional life ==
Anglade exhibited in Paris and regularly appeared at the usual exhibitions, especially the Salon des Artistes Français, where he was awarded a distinction in 1903. A year later, one of his nude studies was thought to be "slightly violent and acerbic". The French journal La Revue described him in 1915 as "one of our best artists of the pencil".

Early in his career, Vincent-Anglade became a fashionable portrait painter, mainly of intimate paintings of women. He was a regular at greyhound and horse races and was an enthusiast of big game hunting. He was also valued as an animal painter.

== Death ==
Vincent-Anglade died on January 25, 1956, at age 79. A wife and two sons survived him.

== See also ==
- René Vincent
- Benezit Dictionary of Artists
