= Jean Turlais =

French essayist and poet

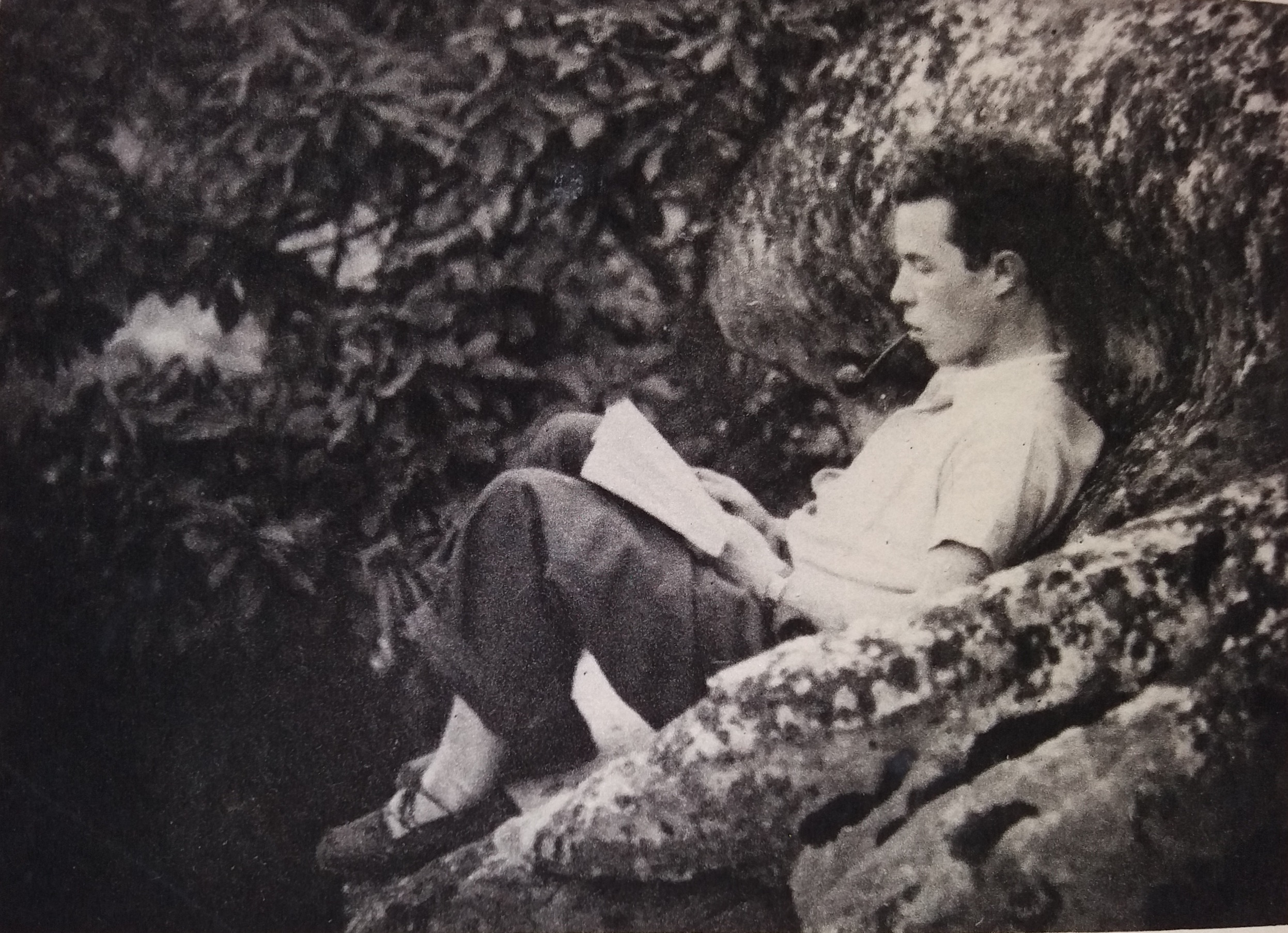
- Born: 1922; Paris, France
- Died: 4 April 1945 (aged 22–23); Alsace, France
- Occupations: essayist, theatre critic, poet

Jean Turlais (1922–1945) was a French essayist, poet and literary critic.

== Biography ==
Initially leading the Lycéens Bonapartistes in 1938 at sixteen, Turlais succeeded Claude Wacogne. By 1940, as an eighteen-year-old student, he expressed fervent nationalism, dreaming of countering Germany and reclaiming the left bank of the Rhine. Despite his intentions of joining General Charles de Gaulle in London, Turlais was captivated by the German army's arrival in Paris, attributing virtues to the occupying troops that he found lacking in his compatriots. He joined the Milice française on June 6, 1944, the day of the Normandy invasion, and later participated in the liberation of Paris with the 2nd Armored Division.

Turlais met his end on April 4, 1945, in Alsace, a month before Germany's capitulation, due to a grenade explosion.

As a theatre critic and poet, he contributed to the Vichy and Parisian publications Idées and Les Cahiers français. Despite being listed as a proscribed writer by the Comité national des écrivains, he co-founded the publishing house La Table Ronde in 1944 with Roland Laudenbach and Roger Mouton. His involvement in various theatrical groups and his collaboration with Jean Cocteau underscored his influential role in Paris's intellectual circles.

Turlais was also associated with notable writers such as Jean Genet, whom he and Laudenbach helped introduce to the Parisian literary scene. His controversial works included an essay, Introduction à une histoire de la littérature 'fasciste', which sought to reframe fascism through a subjective and aesthetic lens.

== Works ==
- Poèmes de guerre, La Pensée française (1946)
- Savoir par cœur. Poèmes, prèf. de Jean Cocteau, (1949)
