= Paul Sérant =

French journalist (1922–2002)

- Born: 19 March 1922; Paris, France
- Died: 4 October 2002 (aged 80); Avranches, Manche, France
- Occupations: Journalist and writer

Paul Sérant is the pen name of Paul Salleron (19 March 1922 – 4 October 2002), a French journalist and writer. He was the brother of the Catholic theoretician Louis Salleron. He was a great lover of the French language, but was also a lover of regional diversity, and supported preservation of local cultures such as Breton, Occitan and Basque. His vision for Europe was one in which the nation-states would be dissolved, leaving a federation of ethnic groups.

== Life ==
Paul Salleron was born on 10 March 1922 in Paris. He was one of nine children, the younger brother of the Catholic journalist and theorist Louis Salleron. He was educated by priests. During the occupation of France in World War II (1939–45) he was a member of the Resistance. He then joined the BBC foreign service. He adopted the pen name of Paul Sérant.

The journal Accent grave (revue de l'Occident) was launched in 1963 and published fewer than a dozen issues. Its board of directors included Sérant, Pierre Andreu, Michel Déon, Roland Laudenbach and Philippe Héduy. The journal promoted the ideas of Charles Maurras and had as its theme the crisis of Western civilization. Sérant won three awards from the Académie française:

Year	Award	Work	Amount
1975	Prix Broquette-Gonin (littérature)	Le Mont Saint Michel ou l’Archange pour tous les temps	500 F
1990	Prix Eugène Colas	Les grands déchirements des catholiques français	Médaille d’argent
1992	Prix Mottart	Ensemble de son œuvre	20,000 F

Sérant died on 2 October 2002 in Avranches, Manche.

== Thought ==
Sérant, though he wrote prolifically, was not part of the literary world, and was not well-known to the public. He published novels that reflected his personal experiences in the post-war period, and he was interested in the mystical and esoteric writings of George Gurdjieff. At first, he was interested in the ideas of traditionalist thinkers such as René Guénon. Later, he devoted himself to the study of ideologies, the crisis of civilization, and regionalism. Sérant was a penetrating and independent thinker who always challenged orthodox opinions of both the left and the right. He wrote about the intellectuals who had collaborated with the German occupiers, and of Portugal under the dictatorship of Salazar. In the early 1970s, he engaged in a vigorous debate with the journalist Louis Pauwels, whom he considered too optimistic, too right-wing, and too Western.

Sérant loved the French language and was proud of its global usage. He said that he would defend the language for its own sake even if it were only used by a small community. In his last work, Les enfants de Jacques Cartier, he explored the history of Americans of French ethnicity including Québécois, Acadians, French-speaking New Englanders, Franco-Indian Métis from Western Canada and Cajuns from Louisiana. His book also examined French-speaking communities in Wallonia, Switzerland and the Aosta Valley. He said that the Jacobin state was the reason for the lack of interest in ethnic French communities outside France, and for the persecution of alien cultures within France.

Sérant was a close follower of Simone Weil and believed in the importance of local roots. He adopted the saying of the Portuguese poet Miguel Torga: "Universal is local without walls". He defended regional cultures such as the Bretons, Occitans and Basques. He saw no problem with these peoples rediscovering the wealth of their original languages, which could not threaten the French language. He wrote, "If I refuse the Bretons the right to speak Breton, I expose myself to one day being refused the right to speak French." In his book La France des minorités (1965), Sérant celebrated and defended the diversity of the regional communities of Flanders, Brittany, the Basque Country, Occitania, Catalonia, Corsica, Alsace and Lorraine. He denounced the destructive Jacobinism that would force all the provinces into the same uniform mold, seeing intolerance of internal diversity as equivalent to hatred of foreign nations and refusal to accept new ideas.

Sérant believed that ethnicism, with its respect for a diversity of cultures, was the opposite of racism, which tried to exalt one community at the expense of others. He thought that the European Federation, starting as a federation of states, could evolve into a federation of ethnic groups in which the unitary French state would disappear. He wrote:

Europe almost became French with Napoleon, and almost became German with Hitler. In either case, it would have been only a subjugated Europe. The Europe we want must be neither French nor German, but European, that is to say, it must allow development of all its peoples and all its cultures. More varied than any other continent, it must be able to make its unity without sacrificing anything of that diversity which constitutes its most astonishing privilege.

== Publications ==
Publications include:

- Le meurtre rituel (novel), Paris: la Table ronde, 1950, p. 255
- René Guénon, Paris: La Colombe, éditions du Vieux-Colombier, 1953, p. 186
- Au seuil de l'ésotérisme, Paris: B. Grasset, 1955, p. 256
- Les inciviques (novel), Paris: Plon, 1955, p. 255
- Gardez-vous à gauche, Paris: Fasquelle, 1956, p. 147
- Où va la droite ?, Preface by Marcel Aymé, Paris: Plon, 1958, p. 175
- Plus loin vers l'Est (novel), La Revue des Deux Mondes, 1960
- Le romantisme fasciste : étude sur l'oeuvre politique de quelques écrivains français, Paris: Fasquelle, 1960, p. 324
- Salazar et son temps, Paris: les Sept couleurs, 1961, p. 216
- Les vaincus de la Libération. L’épuration de 1944 - 1945 en Europe occidentale, Robert-Laffont, 1964
- La France des minorités, Robert-Laffont, 1965
- Le réveil ethnique des provinces de France, Centre d’études politiques et civiques, 1966
- L'Expansion américaine, Paris: Culture-Arts-Loisir, 1968, p. 310
- Le réveil ethnique des provinces de France... conférence faite... [à Paris] le 28 avril 1966..., Paris: Centre d'études politiques et civiques, DLI, 1968, p. 48
- La Bretagne et la France..., Paris: Fayard, 1971, p. 443
- Lettre à Louis Pauwels sur les gens inquiets et qui ont bien le droit de l'être, Paris: la Table ronde, 1971, p. 215
- Des choses à dire, Paris: la Table ronde, 1973, p. 232
- Le Mont-Saint-Michel ou l'Archange pour tous les temps, Paris: Éditions S.O.S., 1974, p. 239
- René Guénon 2 éd. revue et augmentée, Paris: le Courrier du livre, 1977, p. 230
- Les dissidents de l'Action française, Paris: Copernic, 1978, p. 323
- L'Aventure spirituelle des Normands, Paris: R. Laffont, 1981, p. 270
- Les Grands déchirements des catholiques français 1870-1988 (essay), Paris: Perrin, 1988, p. 283
- Les Enfants de Jacques Cartier du Grand Nord au Mississippi, les Américains de langue française, Paris: R. Laffont, 1990, p. 290
- Dictionnaire des écrivains français sous l'Occupation, Paris: Grancher, 2002, p. 348

Sérant wrote prefaces to:

- Thierry Maulnier (1993), Au-delà du nationalisme, Preface by Paul Sérant, Paris: Ed. des Grands classiques, p. 254
- Louis Aragon (1968), Les beaux quartiers, Preface by Paul Sérant, Paris: C.A.L., Culture, art, loisirs, p. 527

== Sources ==
- Morel, Ludovic (2010-06-03), "Thierry Maulnier, soldat maurrassien de l'humanisme", Le Maurrassisme et la culture: L'action française, culture, société, politique (III) (in French), Presses Univ. Septentrion, ISBN 978-2-7574-0147-7
- Paul SERANT (in French), Académie française
- Paul Sérant (1922-2002): pseudonyme individuel, BnF: Bibliotheque nationale de France
- "Paul Serant", lecteurs.com
- "Paul Sérant, le franc Européen", esprit-europeen.fr (in French), archived from the original on 2011-01-23
