= François Natter =

- Born: François Victor Étienne Natter; December 26, 1922; Paris, France
- Died: June 11, 2005 (aged 82); Bourges, France
- Other name: Étienne Malnoux
- Occupations: Academic, writer, intellectual
- Known for: Founding and serving as dean of free faculties

François Natter (December 26, 1922 – June 11, 2005) was a French academic, intellectual, and nationalist royalist. He founded and served as dean of private universities and was also known by his pen name Étienne Malnoux.

== Biography ==
François Natter studied at the Lycée Charlemagne in Paris and later at the Lycée Henri-IV, where he prepared for higher education. He became active in the Action française student movement during the latter part of World War II and participated in their national congress in April 1944 in Lyon, presenting a lecture titled "Revolution or restoration: a constant of a new order."

After a stint as an assistant in a British Catholic school, Natter worked as a teacher at the Lycée Alain Fournier in Bourges during the 1950s. He became president of the local section of the Association Guillaume Budé and was involved with the Cercle Fustel de Coulanges. Later, he taught in higher education, teaching at the Université de Paris and Paris-Sorbonne University (Paris-IV) as an assistant professor and lecturer in English.

In the 1960s, under the pseudonym Étienne Malnoux, he contributed to the anti-Gaullist, pro-French Algeria magazine L'Esprit public. He also co-signed the "Manifeste des intellectuels français pour la résistance à l'abandon" in October 1960.

Natter later collaborated with the traditionalist Catholic and anti-communist journal Itinéraires, where he expressed strong opposition to university reforms and "Marxist cultural revolution" in education. In 1968, he founded the Cercle Augustin Cochin to critically analyze revolutionary cultural goals and methods. He was also involved in establishing the Confédération des clubs et mouvements libres to address social and educational issues.

In response to the events of May 1968, Natter founded FACLIP (Faculté libre internationale pluridisciplinaire), a private university intended to counter perceived ideological biases in public institutions.

In the 1970s, Natter transitioned to directing another institution, the Faculté libre de Paris et de l'Ile-de-France, which he managed until his death. The faculty received financial support from the French state and the city of Paris until the 1990s, despite its controversial alignment with traditionalist Catholic and nationalist principles.

He was an active participant in royalist and traditionalist circles, contributing to the Cahiers Charles Maurras and organizing conferences on the works of Charles Maurras. He also revived the Revue universelle in 1974 as La Revue universelle des faits et des idées.
