= Georges Marçais =

French archaeologist (1876–1962)

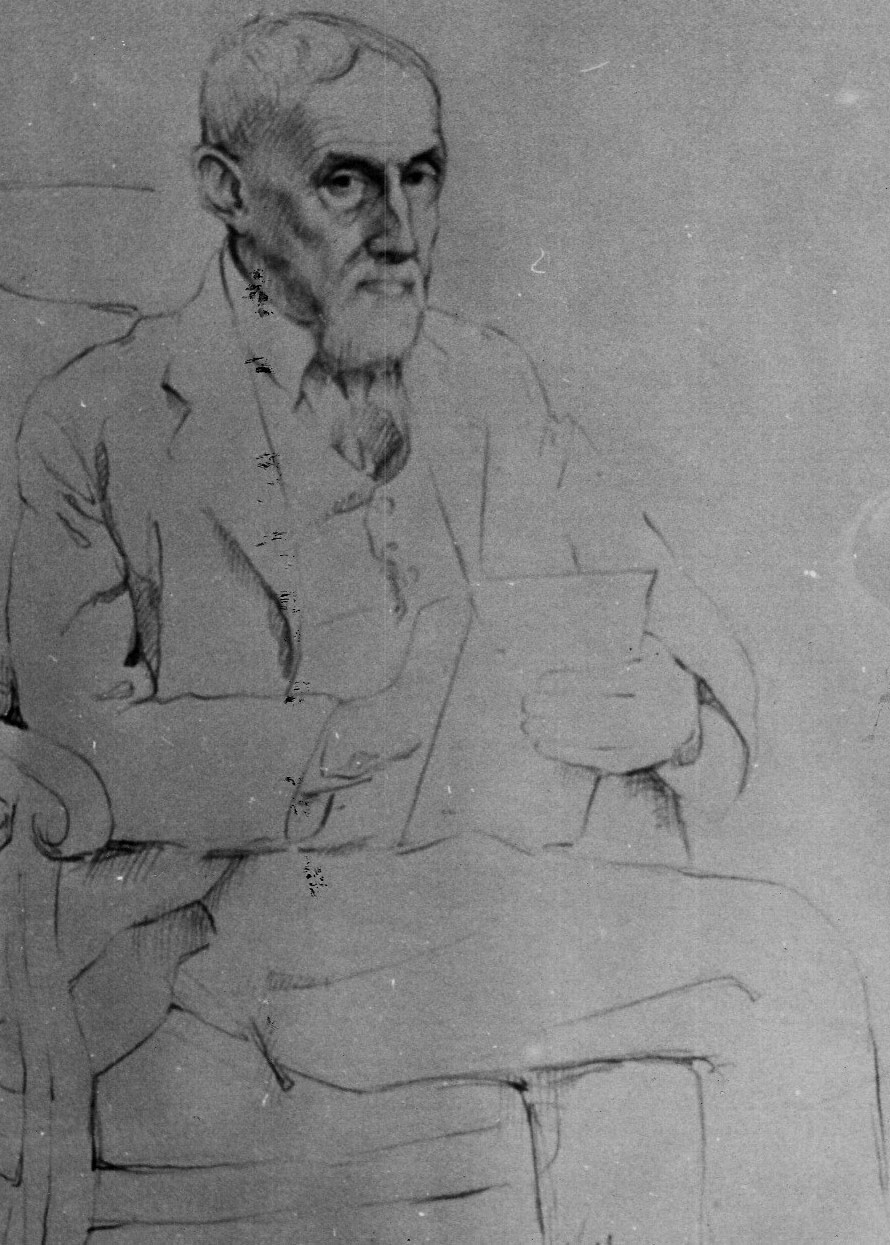
Georges Marçais (1953 drawing)

Georges Marçais (Rennes, 11 March 1876 – Paris, 20 May 1962) was a French orientalist, historian, and scholar of Islamic art and architecture who specialized in the architecture of North Africa.

== Biography ==
He initially trained as a painter and writer but after visiting his brother, William Marçais (1872–1956), an orientalist who directed a school in Algeria, he turned instead to scholarly studies. After writing his thesis on Berbers in North Africa, he was a professor at the University of Algiers (1919–44; during the French occupation of Algeria) and wrote numerous books and articles.

== Academic contributions ==
One of his main overall contributions to the scholarly study of Islamic art/architecture was to highlight the architecture of the western Islamic world – the Maghreb and Al-Andalus – as its own regional style (popularly called "Moorish" architecture) which could be distinguished from the artistic traditions in the more eastern parts of the Islamic world. One of his books, L’Architecture musulmane d’occident: Tunisie, Algérie, Maroc, Espagne et Sicile, published in 1954, is still considered one of the standard works on this subject.

== Selected publications ==
- Les Monuments arabes de Tlemcen (Paris, 1903) – with William Marçais
- Coupoles et plafonds de la Grande Mosquée de Kairouan (Paris, 1925)
- Manuel d’art musulman: L’Architecture: Tunisie, Algérie, Maroc, Espagne, Sicile, 2 vols. (Paris, 1926–7)
- Les Faïences à reflets métalliques de la Grande Mosquée de Kairouan (Paris, 1928)
- Le Costume musulman d’Alger (Paris, 1930)
- Tunis et Kairouan (Paris, 1937)
- "Les Broderies turques d’Alger," Ars Islamica, vol. 4 (1937), pp. 145–53
- "Remarques sur l’esthétique musulmane," Annales de l'Institut d'Études Orientales, vol. 4 (1938), pp. 55–71
- "La Conception des villes dans l’Islâm," Revue d'Alger, vol. 2 (1945), pp. 517–33
- La Berbérie musulmane et l’orient au moyen âge (Paris, 1946)
- L’Art de l’Islam (Paris, 1947)
- "Nouvelles remarques sur l’esthétique musulmane," Annales de l'Institut d'Études Orientales, vol. 6 (1947), pp. 31–52
- Objets kairouanais, IXe au XIIIe siècle: Reliures, verreries, cuivres et bronzes, bijoux, 2 vols. (Tunis, 1948–52) – with L. Poinssot
- "Salle, antisalle: Recherches sur l’évolution d’un thème de l’architecture domestique en pays d’Islâm," Annales de l'Institut d'Études Orientales, vol. 10 (1952), pp. 274–301
- L’Architecture musulmane d’occident: Tunisie, Algérie, Maroc, Espagne et Sicile (Paris, 1954)
- La Grande Mosquée de Sfax (Tunis, 1960) – with Lucien Golvin
- L’Art musulman (Paris, 1962)
