= French Algerian Front =

Anti-independence movement in French Algeria

French Algerian Front Front Algérie française
- Abbreviation: FAF
- Past Presidents: Saïd Boualam; Yvan Santini
- Founded: 15 June 1960
- Banned: 15 December 1960
- Succeeded by: France-Resurrection; Organisation armée secrète
- Headquarters: Boulevard Baudin, Algiers, French Algeria
- Ideology: Anti-independence; French nationalism Francophilia
- Political position: Right-wing
- Colors: Blue, white and red (flag of France)

The French Algerian Front (FAF; French: Front Algérie française) was a political and militant movement in favour of Algeria remaining an integral part and colony of France, established in 1960 in Algiers. Its founder was Saïd Boualam.

On 11 November 1960, a demonstration called by the FAF degenerated into a riot. A few weeks later, the FAF called for the visit of president Charles de Gaulle to be violently opposed and for the army to mutiny against the government's orders.

== History ==
=== Creation of the FAF ===
The FAF was established on 15 June 1960 following a meeting between former FNN and ex-UNR held at 73 Alfred Street-Leluch in Algiers. Yvan Santini announced the creation of the FAF at a press conference held the same day or 17 June, according to sources.

=== Violent Manifestations and Dissolution ===
Riot of the FAF on 11 November 1960, in Algiers. 100 wounded and 70 arrests

On 11 November 1960, a demonstration at the call of the French Algerian Front resulted in a riot in Algiers.

On 8 December, the movement called for violent opposition to the visit of General de Gaulle and, to the army, to no longer support its policy in Algeria.

Following the riots in Algiers on 9 December, the French Algerian Front was banned by the French authorities on 15 December.

=== Clandestine activity ===
On 7 March 1961, a leaflet claiming a series of attacks perpetrated in Algiers was signed jointly by the FAF and the France-Resurrection network, an organization separate from the OAS.

== Notable personalities of the FAF ==
- Saïd Boualam, Vice-President (Deputy RNUR)

=== Oranie ===
- Yvan Santini, Spokesperson (General Councilor)
- Villeneuve, leader (general councilor)
- Conesa, leader
- Lucien Castelli, Officer (in charge of financial files)

=== Algerian ===
- Antoine Andros, Officer (City Councilor)
- Camille Vignau, director (general councilor)
- Dominique Zatarra, leader
- André Seguin, director (journalist)

=== Constantine ===
- Edme Canat (deputy Unity of the Republic)
- Pierre Portolano (Deputy Unity of the Republic)

== See also ==
- Organisation armée secrète (OAS)
- Algerian War
