= Saïd Boualam =

French politician

- سعيد بوعلام
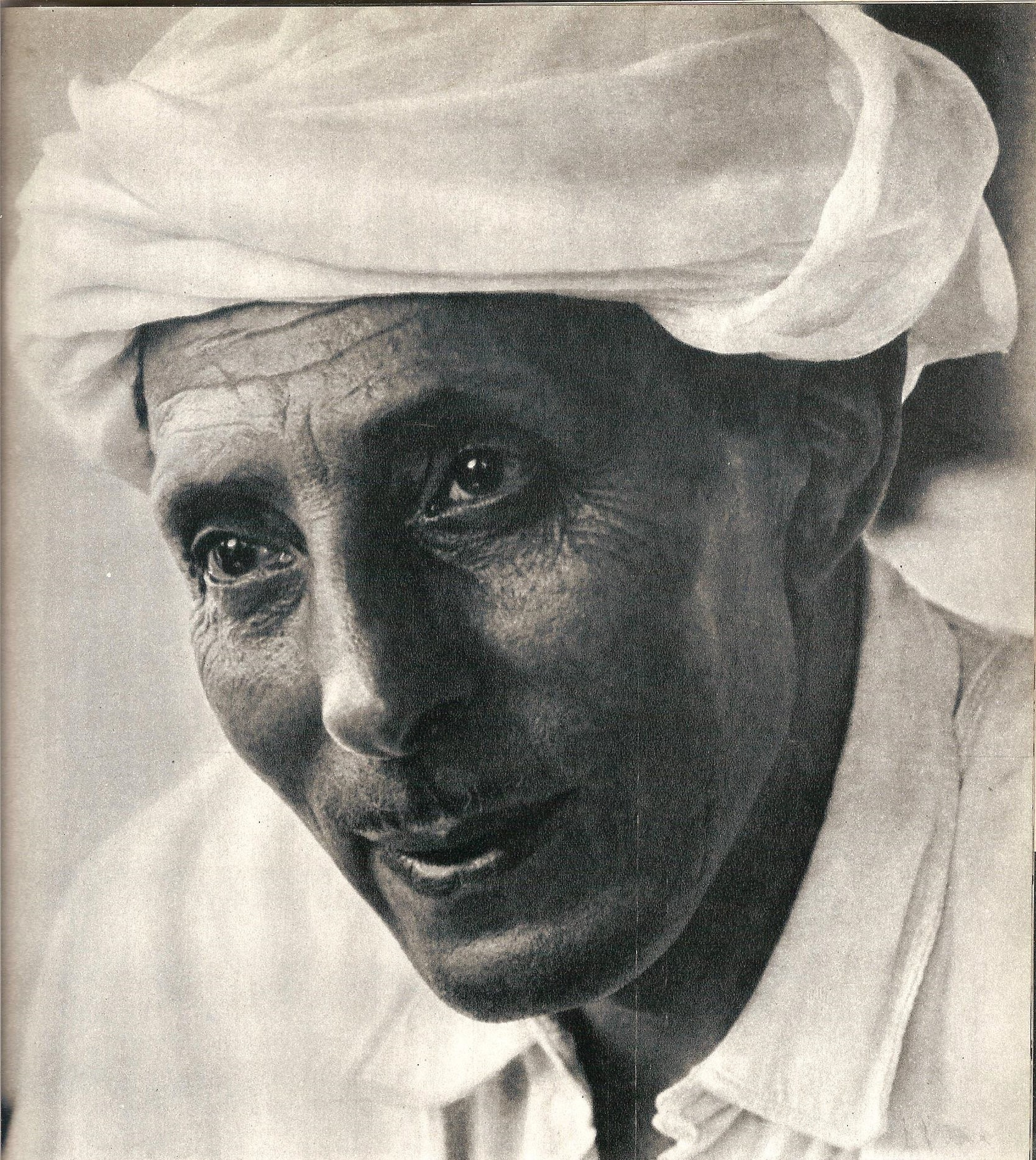

Member of the National Assembly for Orleánsville
- In office 9 December 1958 – 3 July 1962

Personal details
- Born: October 2, 1906 Souk Ahras, French Algeria
- Died: February 8, 1982 (aged 75) Mas-Thibert, France
- Citizenship: France
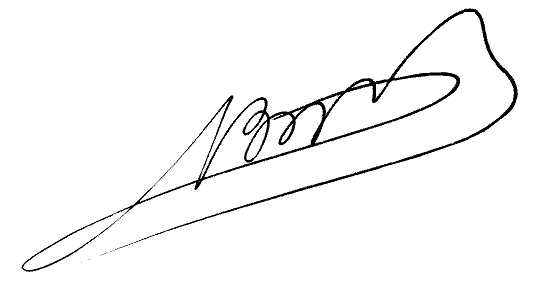
- Signature

Saïd Boualam (2 October 1906 – 8 February 1982) was an Algerian-French politician and military officer. He was a colonel in the French Army, and the founder of the French Algerian Front (FAF), a political and militant movement in favour of French Algeria.

He was elected a député during the Fifth Republic for Orléansville, for the party Regroupement national pour l'unité de la République (RNUR) in 1958. On 26 September 1959 he survived an attempted assassination.

In 1960 he was responsible for the creation of the French Algerian Front, which was banned by the French government after less than a year. After the group was disbanded he retired to France in 1962. He died on 8 February 1982 at Mas-Thibert, about 18 kilometres (11 mi) from Arles.

From 1958 to 1962, Boualam was four times elected vice-president of the National Assembly, becoming a symbol of pro-French Muslims.

== Honours ==
- Grand Officer of the Légion d’honneur (1978)
- Commander of the Légion d'honneur
- Croix de Guerre 1939-1945
- Croix de la Valeur militaire
- Croix du Combattant

== Works ==
- Mon pays, la France, éd. France Empire, Paris, 1962
- Les Harkis au service de la France, éd. France Empire, Paris, 1963
- L'Algérie sans la France, éd. France Empire, Paris, 1964
