= Georges Gaudy =

Belgian painter and cyclist

- Born: Georges Gaudy ca. 1872; Belgium
- Died: ca. 1940 n/a
- Occupation: Painter

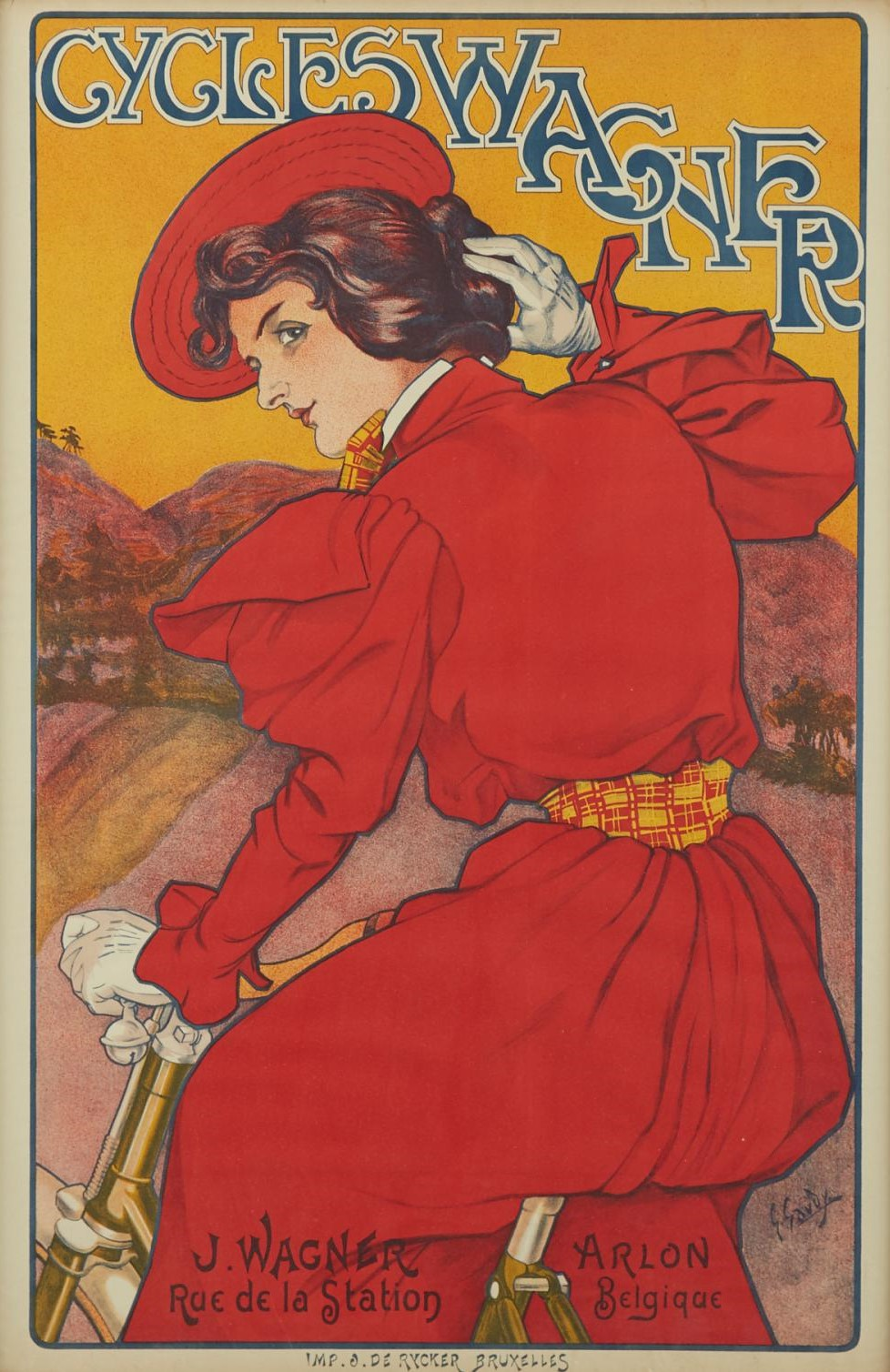

Georges Gaudy (1872–1940) was a Belgian poster artist, painter and champion cyclist.

Gaudy's first poster was commissioned for the Brussels Velodrome and many of his works featured bicycle and car manufacturers.
