= William Marçais =

William Ambroise Marçais (6 November 1872, Rennes – 1 October 1956, Paris), was a French Orientalist, particularly noted as an expert on the Maghrebi Arabic dialects.

== Biography ==
William Marçais was born in Rennes in 1872. After finishing the local lycée, he studied law at the University of Rennes. Soon after his successful graduation and as he was contemplating a career in the diplomatic service, his lecture of the works of Ernest Renan turned him towards the study of the Semitic languages.

In 1894 he therefore went to Paris and enrolled in the École des langues orientales, where he studied Literary Arabic, Maghrebi Arabic, Turkish and Persian under Hartwig Derenbourg and Octave Houdas. In 1898 he successfully defended his doctoral thesis on Islamic law. In the same year he assumed the position of director of the madrasa of Tlemcen in French Algeria. In 1904 he became director of the madrasa of Algiers, five years later advanced to the position of inspector general of the education system for the native population, and in 1913 he was named as director of the École supérieure de langue et littérature arabe at Tunis. In 1916, he returned to Paris, where he became teacher of vulgate Arabic at the École des langues orientales, rising to professor in 1920. He remained there until 1927, when he assumed a chair at the Collège de France, where he remained until his retirement in 1942.

He was a member of the following societies:

- Académie des Inscriptions et Belles-Lettres
- Comité des travaux historiques et scientifiques
- Archaeological society of the Département de Constantine
- Société de Linguistique de Paris

He was the brother of Georges Marçais and father of Philippe Marçais (1910-1984), also an Arabist.

== Publications ==
- William Marçais, Des parents et alliés successibles en droit musulman, University of Rennes, Faculty of Law, Doctoral thesis. 1898
- William Marçais, Le Taqrîb de En-Nawawi. Translated & annotated edition, 1901
- William Marçais, Le dialecte arabe parlé à Tlemcen, 1902
- William Marçais, Les monuments arabes de Tlemcen, 1903
- William Marçais, Le dialecte arabe des Ulâd Brahîm de Saîda. Mémoires de la Société de Linguistique de Paris, 1908
- William Marçais, Les traditions islamiques, 1914
- William Marçais, Textes arabes de Takroûna. Transcription, annotated translation and glossary, 1925
- William Marçais, La vie féminine au Mzab, 1927-1931
- Mélanges Gaudefroy-Demombynes, 1935
- Foreword for M. S. Meissa. Le message du pardon d'Abou l'Ala de Maarra., 1933
