= Jacques Perret =

French architect

Jacques Perret (c. 1540–1610) was a French architect in the service of the Catholic King Henry IV of France. He was a Huguenot, from the Savoie.

In July 1601, he published a sequence of 22 plates, engraved by Thomas de Leu, and a textual commentary, Des Fortifications et Artifices Architecture et Perspective. Perret offered his work, a series of ideal city plans with fortifications, to the service of the king.

The plans themselves are unremarkable as descendants of the Italian Renaissance penchant for radially symmetrical city design (e.g. Filarete's Sforzinda); what makes Perret's work noteworthy is the compulsive ornamentation of the city walls with biblical quotes, particularly from the psalms. His closest French Protestant predecessor was Bernard Palissy, better known for his work in ceramics, who includes a similar city in an appendix to his 1563 Recette véritable, a garden based on the psalms. Perret's choice of texts also favors the psalms, reinforcing his identity as a Protestant. One statement that shows up repeatedly is, "In God alone is there repose and true happiness," implying that worldly fortifications are useless even against worldly dangers. Several inscriptions carry variations on the theme of the king as God's delegated punisher of evil and protector of the good, an idea with a personal stake for the Calvinist Perret in a Catholic and often hostile France.
