= Pierre Andreu =

French journalist and poet (1909–1987)

- Born: 12 July 1909; Carcassonne, Aude, France
- Died: 25 March 1987 (aged 77); Paris, France
- Occupation: Author

Pierre Andreu (12 July 1909 – 25 March 1987) was a French journalist, essayist, biographer, and poet.

== Life ==
Pierre Andreu was born in 1909 in Carcassonne, Aude. As a student, he was interested in Charles Péguy, Pierre-Joseph Proudhon and Georges Sorel. He later, wrote an essay on Sorel. He was a friend of Pierre Drieu La Rochelle. In the 1930s Andreu was also close to Emmanuel Mounier, founder of the review Esprit, and supported the Cartel des Gauches. Later he became strongly anti-Communist. In 1934, he launched a review with Bertrand de Jouvenel called La Lutte des jeunes (The Struggle of the Young). By the end of the 1930s Andreu called himself a Fascist. Despite this, he remained close to Max Jacob.

Andreu joined Radiodiffusion française after World War II (1939–45). The journal Accent grave (revue de l'Occident) was launched in 1963 and ran to less than a dozen issues. It included Paul Sérant, Pierre Andreu, Michel Déon, Roland Laudenbach and Philippe Héduy on its board. The journal followed the ideas of Charles Maurras and had the theme of the crisis of Western Civilization. Andreu was director of the ORTF office in Beirut from 1966 to 1970, where he came into contact with Arab and Palestinian intellectuals. He contributed to Jean José Marchand's Archives du XXe siècle. He then became the director of the radio channel France Culture.

In 1982, the Académie française awarded Andreu the 15,000 francs Prix de l'essai for his Vie et mort de Max Jacob. Towards the end of his life, Andreu moved towards the left and supported François Mitterrand. He was a friend of Pierre Vidal-Naquet and Jacques Julliard, with whom he directed the Cahiers Georges Sorel. He became deeply pacifist and interested in ecology. Pierre Andreu died in 1987 at the age of 77.

== Works ==
- Pierre Andreu (1952), Drieu, témoin et visionnaire, preface by Daniel Halévy, Grasset
- Pierre Andreu (1953), Notre Maître, M. Sorel, preface by Daniel Halévy, Grasset
- Pierre Andreu (1955), Grandeurs et erreurs des prêtres-ouvriers, Amiot-Dumont
- Pierre Andreu (1960), Histoire des prêtres ouvriers..., Paris: Nouvelles éditions latines
- Pierre Andreu (1962), Max Jacob, Wesmaël-Charlier
- Pierre Andreu (1968), Les Réfugiés arabes de Palestine: Le Malheur des réfugiés, Paris: Association de solidarité franco-arabe
- Pierre Andreu (1977), Le Rouge et le Blanc : 1928–1944 (memoirs), La Table Ronde
- Pierre Andreu; Frédéric Grover (1979), Drieu La Rochelle, Hachette
- Pierre Andreu (1982), Vie et mort de Max Jacob (biography), La Table Ronde
- Pierre Andreu (1982), Georges Sorel entre le noir et le rouge, Paris: Syros
- Pierre Andreu (1991), Poèmes, La Table Ronde
- Pierre Andreu (1991), Révoltes de l'esprit : les revues des années 30, preface by Thierry Paquot, Kimé, ISBN 9782908212075

== Sources ==
- Andreu, Pierre (1909-1987) (in French), IMEC: Institut Mémoires de l’édition contemporaine, 2010-04-18
- Morel, Ludovic (2010-06-03), "Thierry Maulnier, soldat maurrassien de l'humanisme", Le Maurrassisme et la culture: L'action française, culture, société, politique (III) (in French), Presses Univ. Septentrion, ISBN 978-2-7574-0147-7
- Prix de l'Essai (in French), Académie française
- Winock, Michel (2015), Le siècle des intellectuels (in French), Seuil
