= Philippe Marçais =

- Born: 16 March 1910; Algiers
- Died: 31 May 1984 (aged 74); Paris
- Occupations: Politician; Scholar

Philippe Marçais (16 March 1910 – 31 May 1984) was a French Arabist and politician. A director of the Médersa de Tlemcen from 1938 to 1945, he was dean of the Faculté des Lettres d'Alger and député of French Algeria from 1958 to 1962. The Arabist William Marçais was his father.

== Works ==
- 1952: Le parler arabe de Djidjelli (Nord constantinois, Algérie), Paris, Librairie d'Amérique et d'Orient, Publications de l'Institut d'Études Orientales d'Alger.
- 1954: Textes arabes de Djidjelli, text, transcription and translation, Paris, Presses Universitaires de France.
- 1977: Esquisse grammaticale de l'arabe maghrébin, Paris, Librairie d'Amérique et d'Orient.
- 1977: Textes d'arabe maghrébin, with MS.S Hamrouni, Paris, Librairie d'Amérique et d'Orient.
- 2001: Textes arabes du Fezzân, text and translation, Paris, Droz.
