= René Vincent =

French illustrator (1879–1936)

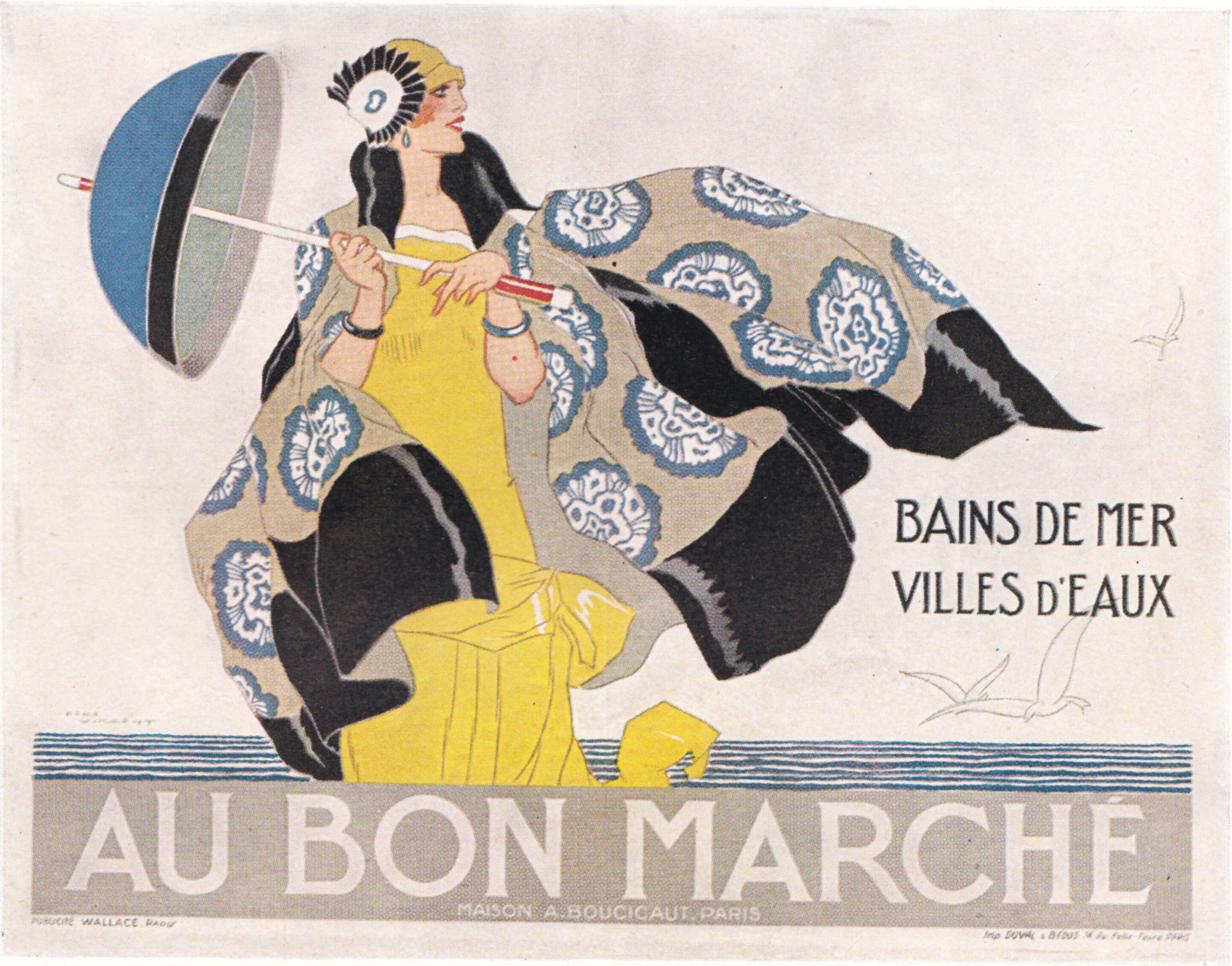
- Reproduction of a poster by René Vincent
- Born: René Vincent; 1879; Bordeaux, France
- Died: 1936 (aged 57)
- Education: Ecole des Beaux-Arts
- Known for: Painting

René Vincent (1879–1936) was a French illustrator who was active in the 1920s-1930s. He worked in an Art Deco style and became famous for his poster designs. He was influential in the Art Deco movement in the period between the two world wars. His illustrations helped define advertising in the 20th century.

== Early life ==
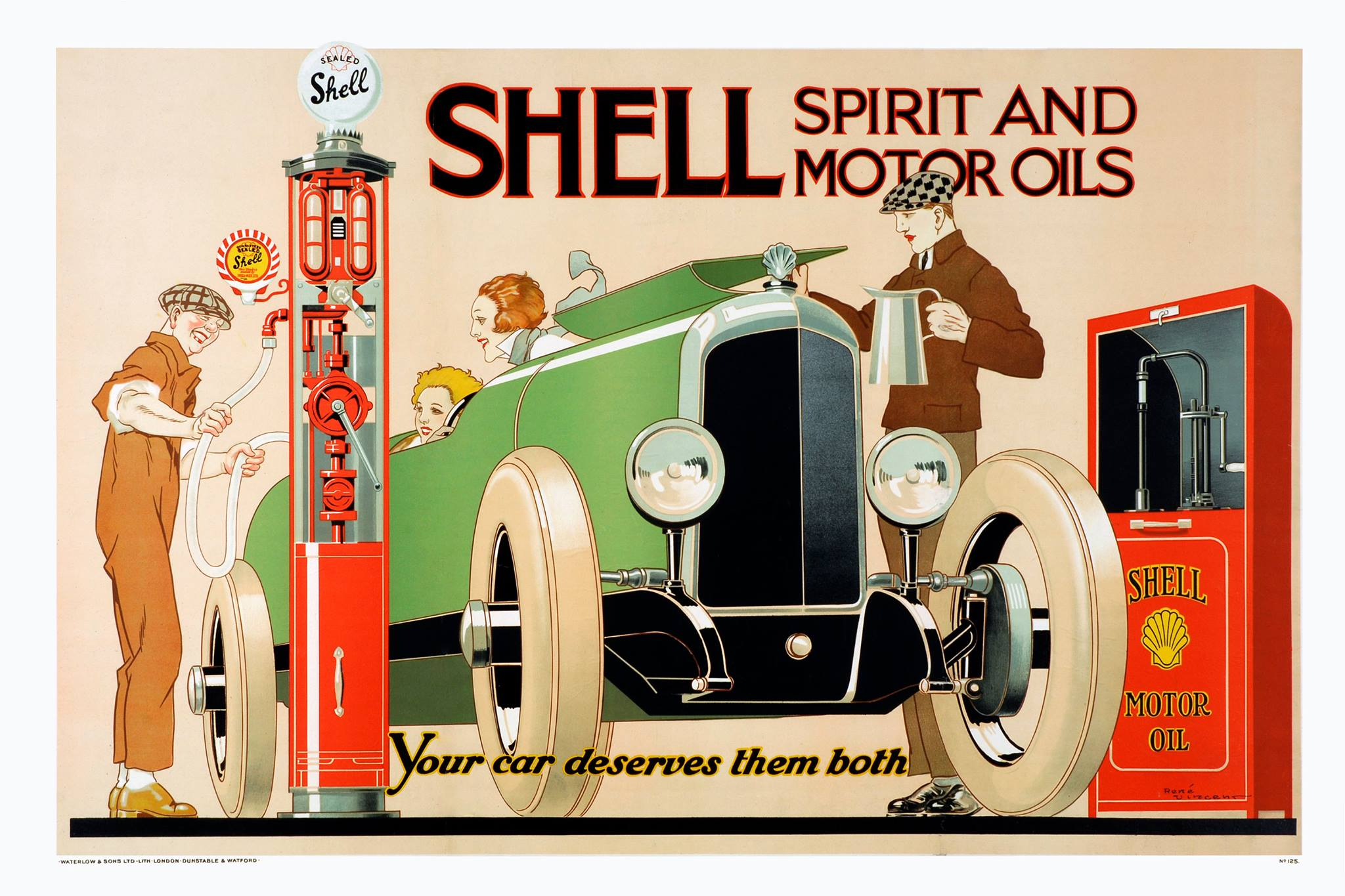
Shell advert - René Vincent, 1926

Vincent was born in 1879 in Bordeaux, France, the son of, novelist Charles Vincent. His older brother was Henri Vincent-Anglade (1876-1956), a portrait painter. Vincent studied at the art school, Ecole des Beaux-Arts in Paris. This is when he started to illustrate books to earn money. It was at this time he changed his major from architecture to graphic arts. Occasionally he went by the pseudonym Rageot.

== Professional life ==
Vincent was an illustrator for La Vie Parisienne, L'Illustration and Fantasio. When he came to the United States, he did work for the Saturday Evening Post and Harper's Bazaar. Most of his contributions to these magazines were fashion illustrations. When he came back to France, he created a plethora of advertisements for Bugatti, Peugeot, Michelin, and Shell Oil Company. His most recognizable work is the 1925 Porto Ramos Pinto poster.

Vincent was a great lover of cars, so as a result he was one of the first French citizens to have a driver's license and was also one of the first Parisians to have a garage built onto his house. Vincent had a particular design style of distorting perspective and dynamism.

== Death ==
Vincent died in 1936 in Paris. He was 57 years old.

== See also ==
- Henri Vincent-Anglade
- Benezit Dictionary of Artists
