= Henri Massis =

French historian and writer (1886–1970)

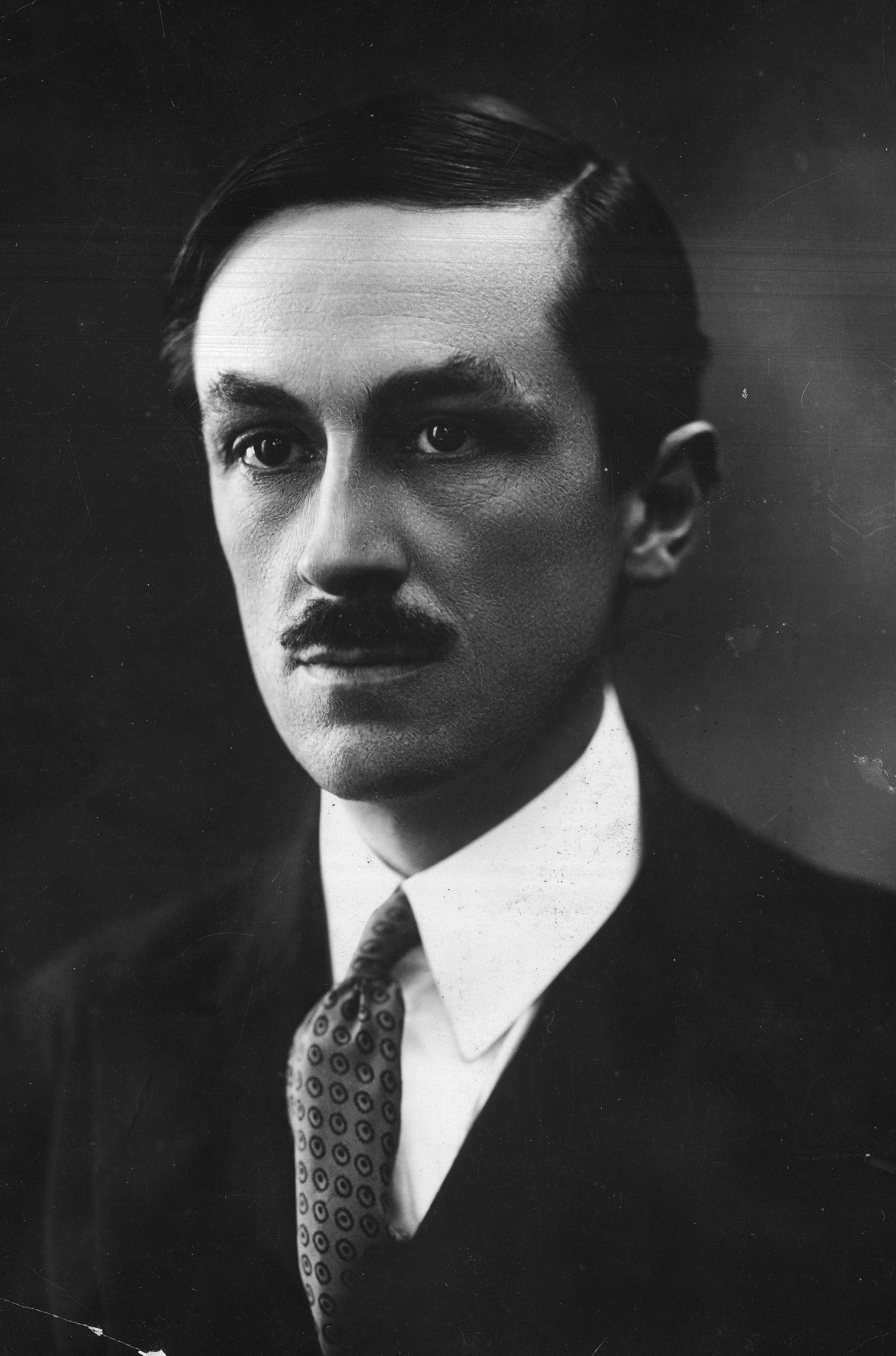
- Henri Massis in 1927
- Born: March 21, 1886; Paris, French Third Republic
- Died: April 16, 1970 (aged 84); Paris, France
- Education: Lycée Condorcet; University of Paris
- Writing career
- Language: French
- Years active: 1905–1967
- Genres: Essay, literary criticism

Henri Massis (21 March 1886 – 16 April 1970) was a French essayist, literary critic and literary historian.

== Biography ==
Massis was born in the 18th arrondissement of Paris, and attended Lycée Condorcet and University of Paris. He began his career as an essayist and critic in his early twenties, with works such as Comment Émile Zola Composait ses Romans (1905), Le Puits de Pyrrhon (1907), and La Pensée de Maurice Barrès (1909). Together with his friend Alfred de Tarde, he published essays commenting on the French university system and the generation of 1912.

Massis converted to Catholicism in 1913 and, following World War I, called for a revival of the French spirit and Catholicism; from early on, he was a follower of Charles Maurras and the Action Française. From 1920 he served as editor of the newly formed Revue Universelle, a magazine closely associated with Action Française which worked to spread Christian political philosophy. He published two volumes of Jugements that critically analysed the moral teachings of numerous writers, such as Ernest Renan and André Gide.

Massis' political writings expressed his concerns over what he viewed as threats to post-World War I French society, including Bolshevism and Oriental mysticism. Together with Robert Brasillach he wrote Les Cadets de l'Alcazar (1936; in English as The Cadets of the Alcazar, 1937), where he expressed support of General Franco and the Nationalists in the ongoing Spanish Civil War. He visited Portugal in 1938, expressing admiration for the regime of António de Oliveira Salazar. In 1939, Chefs ("Chiefs"), a collection of interviews with Franco, Salazar and Benito Mussolini, fascist dictator of Italy, was published. However, Massis condemned Adolf Hitler and the Nazi regime in Germany, as he shared the Germanophobe views of the Action Française.

On 23 January 1941, Massis was made a member of the National Council (parliament) of Vichy France. He was also decorated with the Order of the Francisque. While involved in the Vichy Government during World War II, Massis refused to collaborate with the Nazis. After the war, he was arrested and imprisoned in Fresnes Prison in December 1944. After being released after only one month in January 1945, he went on to work as an editor for Plon. He devoted himself to biographical studies of Ernest Renan, Maurice Barrès, Charles Maurras and António de Oliveira Salazar. Still a follower of the integralist and nationalist philosophy of the Action Française after the war, his writings from this period reflect his continued disdain of Nazism in Germany and Bolshevism in the Soviet Union.

Massis was elected to the Académie française in 1960. Together with other French conservative intellectuals, he signed a manifesto "of resistance to abandonment" in October 1961, a counter-manifesto to the Manifesto of the 121 against the Algerian War. He died in Paris on 16 April 1970.

== Bibliography ==
- Comment Émile Zola composait ses romans, 1905
- Le Puits de Pyrrhon, 1907
- La Pensée de Maurice Barrès, 1909
- L'Esprit de la nouvelle Sorbonne, 1911; with Alfred de Tarde
- Les Jeunes gens d'aujourd'hui, 1913; with Alfred de Tarde
- Romain Rolland contre la France, 1915
- Luther, prophète du germanisme, 1915
- La Vie d'Ernest Psichari, 1916
- Impressions de guerre, 1916
- Le Sacrifice (1914-1916), 1917
- La Trahison de Constantin, 1920
- Jérusalem le Jeudi-Saint de 1918, 1921
- Jugements I: Renan, France, Barrès, 1923
- Jugements II: André Gide, Romain Rolland, Georges Duhamel, Julien Benda, les chapelles littéraires, 1924
- De Lorette à Jérusalem, 1924
- Le Réalisme de Pascal, 1924
- Jacques Rivière, 1925
- En marge de "Jugements", 1927
- Réflexions sur l'art du roman, 1927
- Défense de l'Occident, 1927
- Avant-postes, 1928
- Évocations. Souvenirs (1905-1911), 1931
- Dix ans après, 1932
- Débats, 3 vol., 1934
- Les Cadets de l'Alcazar, 1936; with Robert Brasillach
- Notre ami Psichari, 1936
- Le Drame de Marcel Proust, 1937
- L'Honneur de servir, 1937
- Chefs: Les Dictateurs et nous, 1939
- La Guerre de trente ans: Destin d'un age (1909-1939), 1940
- Les Idées Restent, 1941
- La Prière de Lyautey, 1942
- Découverte de la Russie, 1944
- D'André Gide à Marcel Proust, 1948
- Allemagne d'hier et d'après-demain, 1949
- Portrait de M. Renan, 1949
- Maurras et notre temps, 2 vol., 1951
- L'Occident et son destin, 1956
- Visage des idées, 1958
- À contre-courant, 1958
- L'Europe en question, 1958
- De l'homme à Dieu, 1959
- Salazar face à face, 1961
- Barrès et nous, 1962
- Au long d'une vie, 1967

Works in English translation

- (1928). Defence of the West, Harcourt, Brace & Company [with a preface by G. K. Chesterton].
- (1958). The Choice before Europe, London: Eyre & Spottiswoode [with Alphonse Pierre Juin].
