= The Machine (1994 film) =

1994 French film directed by François Dupeyron

- Theatrical release poster
- Directed by: François Dupeyron
- Written by: François Dupeyron, based on René Belletto's novel
- Produced by: Patrick Bordier; Bernard Bouix; René Cleitman; Ingrid Windisch
- Starring: Gérard Depardieu; Didier Bourdon; Nathalie Baye
- Music by: Michel Portal
- Production companies: France 2 Cinéma; Hachette Première; M6 Films; Prima
- Distributed by: Pan Européenne Distribution
- Release date: November 30, 1994 (France)
- Running time: 96 minutes
- Countries: France; Germany
- Language: French
- Budget: €8.4 million

The Machine (French: La Machine) is a 1994 French science fiction horror thriller film directed by François Dupeyron and based on René Belletto's 1990 novel. Gérard Depardieu and Didier Bourdon star respectively as a psychiatrist and as a serial killer, whose minds swap bodies after they are connected to the titular machine.

The film performed poorly at the French box-office and received mostly negative reviews.

== Plot ==
Psychiatrist Marc Lacroix is obsessed with finding out how the mind forms within the human brain. To advance his research, he has created a device designed to probe the mind of those attached to it. Lacroix has been constructing his mind-reading machine in secret. His marriage to his wife Marie has deteriorated and he is having an affair: his lover, Marianne, is the only other person aware of the device.

In a mental health hospital, Lacroix interviews Michel Zyto, a dangerous psychopath and murderer of three women. Lacroix becomes fascinated with Zyto's sociopathic personality and decides to test his device on him, to analyze how his twisted mind works. Lacroix brings Zyto to his secret laboratory, located in his home's basement, and uses the device on them. Something goes wrong during the experiment, resulting in Lacroix and Zyto's minds swapping bodies.

Upon realizing the situation, Zyto knocks out Lacroix and brings him back unconscious to the psychiatric hospital. He then takes Lacroix's place with Marie and their young son Léonard.

Zyto initially enjoys playing the role of the respectable family man: Marie finds her husband unusually affectionate, though she also notices a change in his parlance and mannerisms. Lacroix, trapped in Zyto's body, eventually manages to escape from the hospital to try and save his family. He seeks help from Marianne and manages to convince her that he is Lacroix.

Marianne tries to warn Marie, who finds her story absurd and tells everything to her "husband". Zyto, informed by the hospital of Lacroix's escape, understands what is going on: he finds Marianne and brutally murders her.

Zyto, having discovered that Lacroix has cancer, becomes desperate to escape from the psychiatrist's body. He arranges a meeting with Lacroix: Zyto gloats about murdering Marianne, but also tells Lacroix that he is willing to reverse the mind-swapping process.

Lacroix and Zyto get back to Lacroix's laboratory but Zyto, having understood how the device works, overpowers Lacroix and locks him into the basement. Zyto then brings Léonard to the laboratory and uses the device on the boy and himself, planning to start a new life in the child's body.

Zyto, now in Léonard's body, calls Marie, feigning panic and telling her that his father has left home and is in danger because of a bad man. Marie returns home and cuddles in bed with her "son", who then butchers her with a knife.

Lacroix manages to break free. He brings Léonard, trapped in his father's body and totally bewildered, with him upstairs, only to be faced by Zyto pointing a gun at them. Marie, dying and covered in blood, stumbles into the corridor, distracting Zyto and allowing Lacroix to overpower him.

Marie succumbs to her injuries. Lacroix uses the device to return everyone's minds to their original bodies. He kills Zyto and destroys the machine. Léonard is driven insane by the ordeal.

Later on, Lacroix is back at the psychiatric hospital, this time as a patient. A broken man, he awaits death, hoping that Léonard can one day recover from his trauma and forgive him.

== Cast ==
- Gérard Depardieu as Marc Lacroix/Michel Zyto/Léonard Lacroix
- Didier Bourdon as Michel Zyto/Marc Lacroix
- Nathalie Baye as Marie Lacroix
- Natalia Wörner as Marianne
- Erwan Baynaud as Léonard Lacroix/Michel Zyto
- Claude Berri as Hugues
- Marc Andreoni as watchman
- Christian Bujeau as Martial
- Julie Depardieu as nurse

== Production ==
Director François Dupeyron, who had never made a genre film before, began working on the project due to his enjoyment of René Belletto's thriller novel. Belletto, who initially felt that a "Hollywood" director would have been more suitable to adapt his book, was convinced by Dupeyron's enthusiasm for the source material.

Dupeyron considered the film a challenge, as science fiction and horror were never the most common genres in French cinema. He managed to secure funding thanks to the involvement of his friend Gérard Depardieu who had starred in his first feature film, A Strange Place to Meet (1988). Didier Bourdon, known in France as a comic actor and a member of the comedy trio Les Inconnus, was cast against type in his dramatic dual role.

A French-German coproduction, The Machine was filmed both in France and in Germany, with interiors being shot at Babelsberg Studio.

== Reception ==
The Machine was a box-office flop in France, where it sold 317, 161 tickets.

The film was also panned by most French critics. Gérard Depardieu's performance received unusually poor reviews, with several critics accusing him of overacting. A review in Le Monde noted that the pairing of the two lead actors in symmetrical dual roles did not work, as Depardieu's "imposing" presence never allowed Bourdon's performance to develop as it should have. Jean-Pierre Dufreigne of L'Express wrote that the film failed to measure up to Belletto's novel and dumbed down the original story.

Lisa Nesselson of Variety gave the film a positive review, finding it efficiently suspenseful and praising Dupeyron's direction as well as the performances of Depardieu and Bourdon.

== Home video ==
The Machine was released on VHS in 1995 but, as of 2023, has not received another physical release in France. It was eventually released on streaming on Canal+. In Germany, the film has received DVD and Blu-ray releases.
