= Le Teil =

- Commune
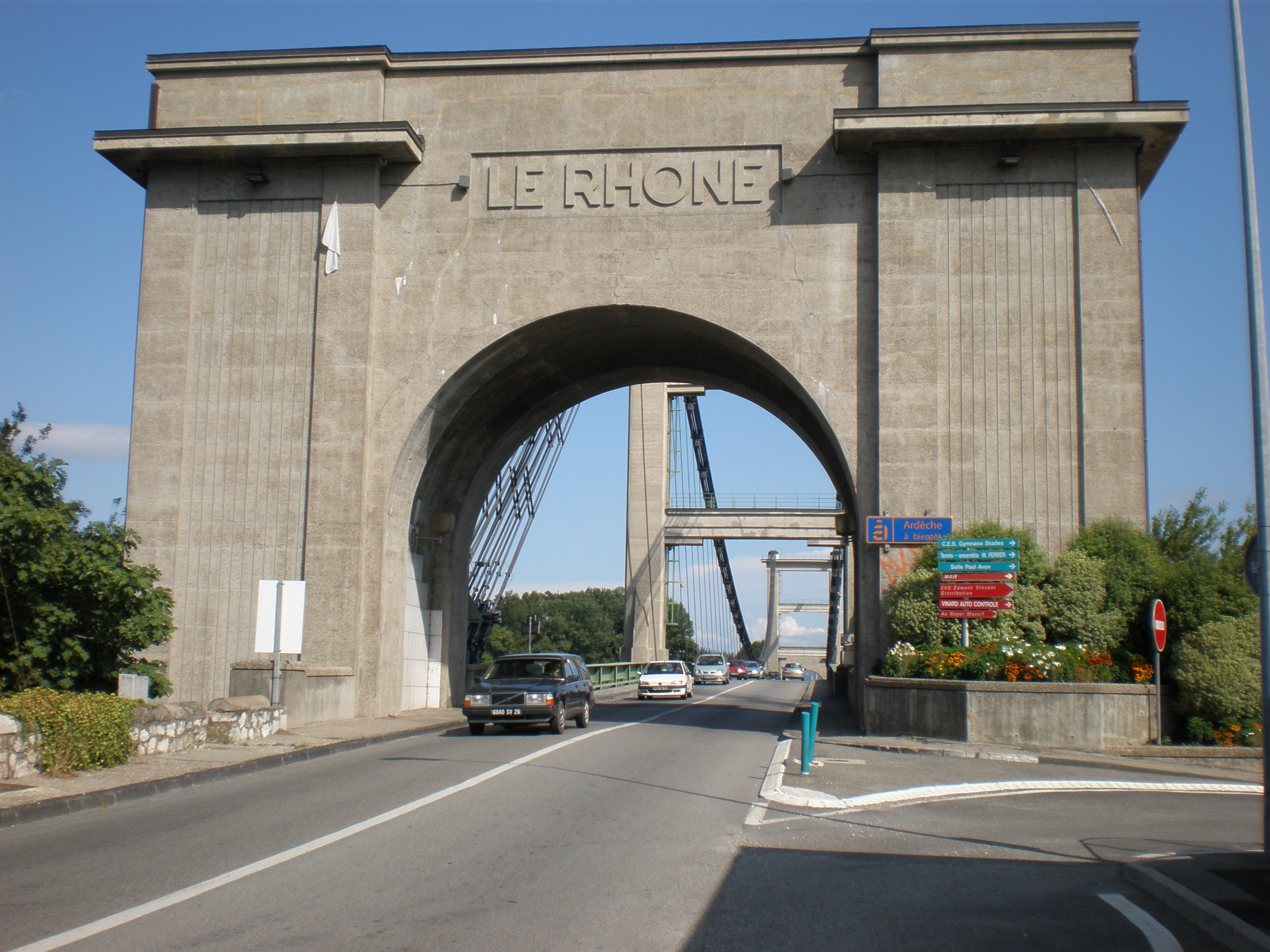
- The bridge over the Rhone, in Le Teil

- Coat of arms
- Location of Le Teil
- Location within France Location within Auvergne-Rhône-Alpes
- Coordinates: 44°32′45″N 4°40′59″E
- Country: France
- Region: Auvergne-Rhône-Alpes
- Department: Ardèche
- Arrondissement: Privas
- Canton: Berg-Helvie

Government
  - Mayor (2020–2026): Olivier Peverelli
- Area^{1}: 26.59 km^{2} (10.27 sq mi)
- Elevation: 73 m (240 ft)
- Highest elevation: 460 m (1,510 ft)
- Lowest elevation: 55 m (180 ft)
- Population (2023): 8,726
  - Density: 328.2/km^{2} (850.0/sq mi)
- Time zone: UTC+01:00 (CET)
  - Summer (DST): UTC+02:00 (CEST)
- INSEE/Postal code: 07319 /07400
- ^{1} French Land Register data, which excludes lakes, ponds, glaciers > 1 km^{2} (0.386 sq mi or 247 acres) and river estuaries.

Le Teil (French pronunciation: [lə.tɛj]; Occitan: Lo Teil) is a commune in the Ardèche department in southern France. The writer Romain Roussel (1898–1973) winner of the Prix Interallié in 1937 was born in Le Teil.

== Population ==
Historical population
Year	Pop.	±% p.a.
1968	8,588	—
1975	8,143	−0.76%
1982	8,089	−0.10%
1990	7,779	−0.49%
1999	7,999	+0.31%
2007	7,941	−0.09%
2012	8,197	+0.64%
2017	8,677	+1.14%
2023	8,726	+0.09%
Source: INSEE

== Geography ==
An earthquake damaged numerous buildings and injured four people in 2019.

== See also ==
- Communes of the Ardèche department
