= Mirandol-Bourgnounac =

- Commune
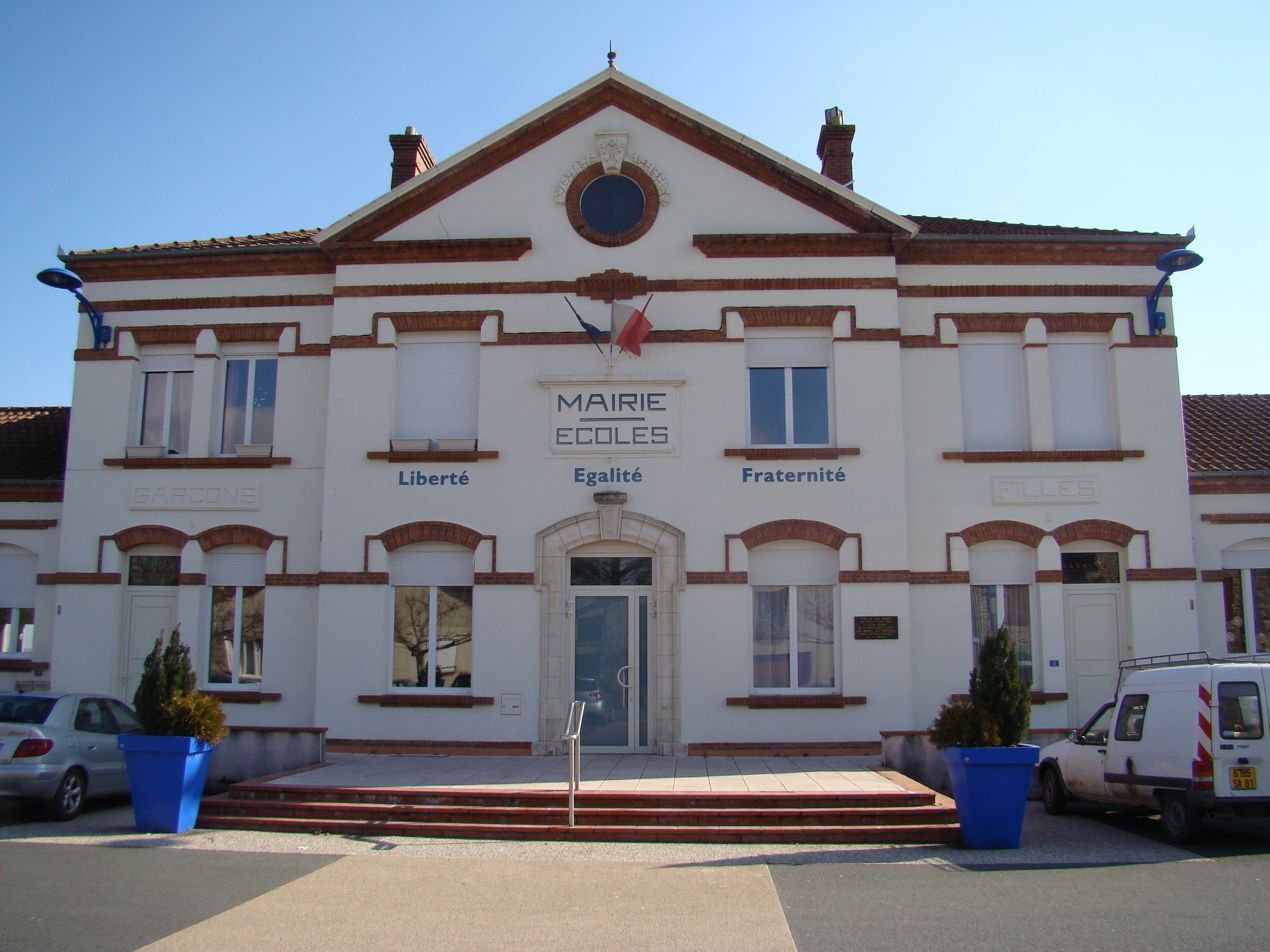
- The town hall in Mirandol-Bourgnounac

- Coat of arms
- Location of Mirandol-Bourgnounac
- Location within France Location within Occitanie
- Coordinates: 44°08′35″N 2°10′02″E
- Country: France
- Region: Occitania
- Department: Tarn
- Arrondissement: Albi
- Canton: Carmaux-1 Le Ségala
- Intercommunality: Carmausin-Ségala

Government
  - Mayor (2020–2026): Sonia Richard-Munoz
- Area^{1}: 38.19 km^{2} (14.75 sq mi)
- Elevation: 396 m (1,299 ft)
- Highest elevation: 435 m (1,427 ft)
- Lowest elevation: 214 m (702 ft)
- Population (2023): 1,059
  - Density: 27.73/km^{2} (71.82/sq mi)
- Time zone: UTC+01:00 (CET)
  - Summer (DST): UTC+02:00 (CEST)
- INSEE/Postal code: 81168 /81190
- ^{1} French Land Register data, which excludes lakes, ponds, glaciers > 1 km^{2} (0.386 sq mi or 247 acres) and river estuaries.

Mirandol-Bourgnounac is a commune in the Tarn department in southern France. René Mauriès, (1921–1999), journalist and writer, winner of the Albert Londres Prize (1956) and the Prix Interallié (1974), was born in Mirandol-Bourgnounac.

== See also ==
- Communes of the Tarn department
