= Sin-le-Noble =

- Commune
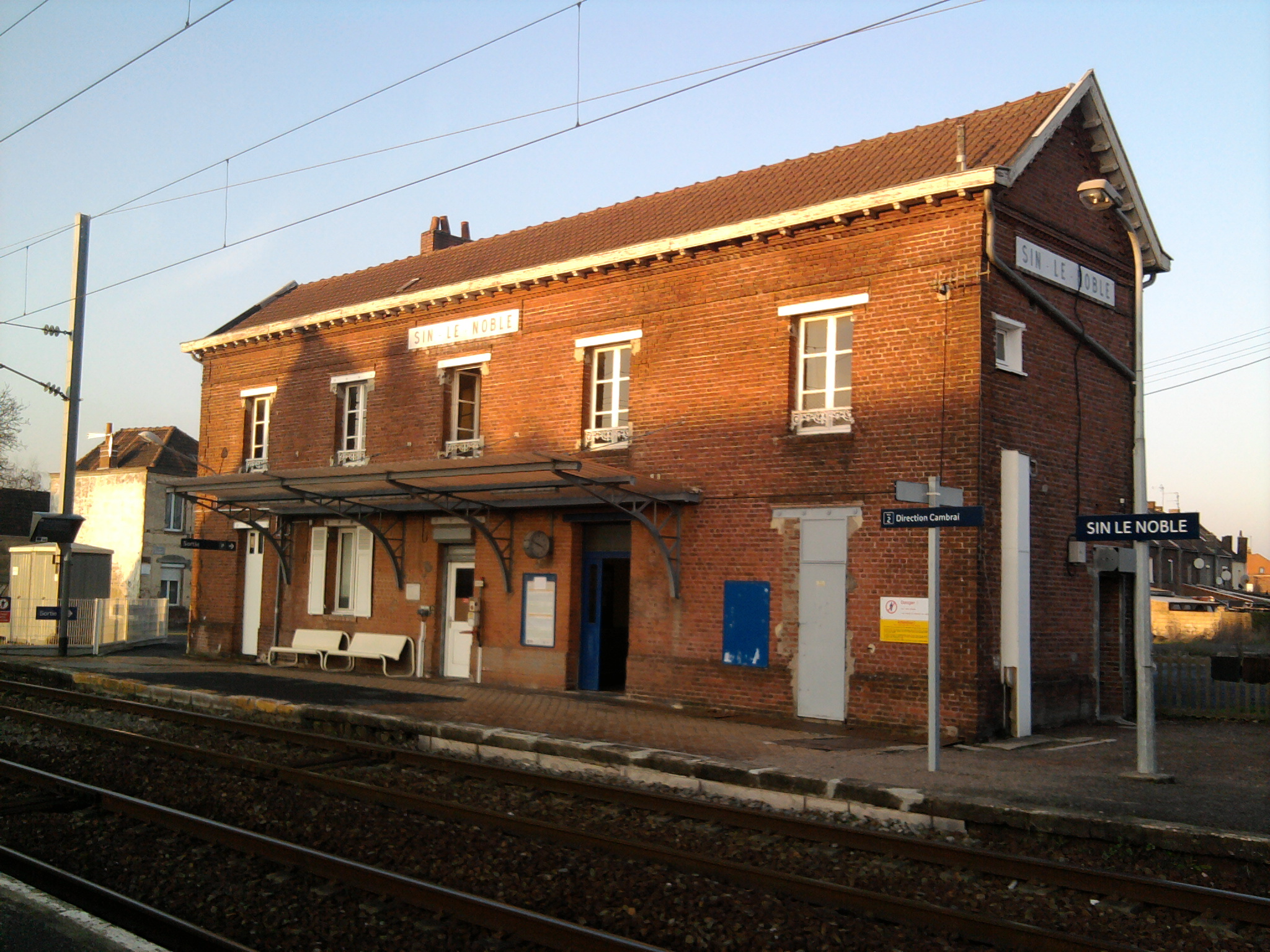
- The railway station building in Sin-le-Noble

- Coat of arms
- Location of Sin-le-Noble
- Location within France Location within Hauts-de-France
- Coordinates: 50°21′47″N 3°06′47″E
- Country: France
- Region: Hauts-de-France
- Department: Nord
- Arrondissement: Douai
- Canton: Sin-le-Noble
- Intercommunality: Douaisis Agglo

Government
  - Mayor (2020–2026): Christophe Dumont
- Area^{1}: 11.53 km^{2} (4.45 sq mi)
- Elevation: 25 m (82 ft)
- Highest elevation: 44 m (144 ft)
- Lowest elevation: 16 m (52 ft)
- Population (2023): 16,076
  - Density: 1,394/km^{2} (3,611/sq mi)
- Time zone: UTC+01:00 (CET)
  - Summer (DST): UTC+02:00 (CEST)
- INSEE/Postal code: 59569 /59450
- ^{1} French Land Register data, which excludes lakes, ponds, glaciers > 1 km^{2} (0.386 sq mi or 247 acres) and river estuaries.

Sin-le-Noble (French pronunciation: [sɛ̃ lə nɔbl]; Picard: Sin-le-Nope) is a commune in the Nord department in northern France.

== Population ==
Historical population
| Year | Pop. | ±% p.a. |
|---|---|---|
| 1968 | 16,056 | — |
| 1975 | 18,664 | +2.17% |
| 1982 | 18,122 | −0.42% |
| 1990 | 16,472 | −1.19% |
| 1999 | 16,972 | +0.33% |
| 2007 | 16,746 | −0.17% |
| 2012 | 15,865 | −1.08% |
| 2017 | 15,682 | −0.23% |
| 2023 | 16,076 | +0.41% |
Source: INSEE

== Notable people ==
- Pierre-Jules Boulanger, born in 1885 in Sin-le-Noble: contributed in the manufacturing of the 2CV.
- Simonne Ratel (1900–1948), woman of letters, winner of the 1932 edition of the Prix Interallié.
- Maurice Allard, bassoonist, born in Sin-le-Noble (1923-2004)

== Twinning ==
- Cecina, Italy
- Święta Katarzyna, Lower Silesian Voivodeship, Poland
- Yéné, Senegal

== See also ==
- Communes of the Nord department
