= Lestienne =

Lestienne is a surname. Notable people with the surname include:

- Constant Lestienne (born 1992), French tennis player
- Maxime Lestienne (born 1992), Belgian footballer
- Voldemar Lestienne (1931–1990), French journalist
