= Menegoz =

Menegoz is a surname. Notable people with the surname include:

- Eugène Ménégoz (1838–1921), French theologian
- Kora Menegoz, botanist whose standard author abbreviation is Menegoz
- Margaret Ménégoz (born 1941), Hungarian-born German-French film producer
- Mathias Menegoz (born 1968), French writer of Hungarian origin
