= Our War =

Our War may refer to:

- Our War (2016 film), a documentary about the Syrian civil war
- Our War (2025 film), a documentary about the Russo-Ukrainian War
