= Humm =

Humm is a surname. Notable people with the surname include:

- Andy Humm (born 1953), American journalist and activist
- Daniel Humm (born 1976), Swiss chef and restaurant owner
- David Humm (1952–2018), American football player
- Fabienne Humm (born 1986), Swiss football player
- Jeremy Humm (born 1983), Australian rules footballer
- Maggie Humm (born 1945), English academic
- Philibert Humm (born 1991), French novelist and journalist
- Philipp Humm (born 1959), German businessman
