= A Dog's Head =

1950 novels by Jean Dutourd

- Author: Jean Dutourd
- Original title: Une tête de chien
- Translator: Robin Chancellor
- Language: French
- Publisher: Éditions Gallimard
- Publication date: 1950
- Publication place: France
- English publication date: 1951
- Pages: 179

A Dog's Head (French: Une tête de chien) is a 1950 novel by the French writer Jean Dutourd. It is about a man who is born with the head of a dog, making him a social outcast who ends up succeeding in finances but struggling with trust and identity. According to Dutourd, the book has no particular thesis and he wrote it "merely to tell a story".

The book was published in an English translation by Robin Chancellor in 1951. Its satire made critics compare Dutourd to Voltaire and Jonathan Swift. It received the Prix Courteline.
