= Maurice Boissais =

French writer

Maurice Boissais is a French writer, winner of Prix Interallié in 1954.

== Works ==
- 1947: Sous les mirabelliers, Éditions de l'amitié (collection of tales from Lorraine)
- 1954: Le Goût du péché, Éditions Julliard, Prix Interallié.
