= Romain Roussel =

French writer

Romain Roussel (1898 in Le Teil, Ardèche – 1973) was a 20th-century French writer, laureate of the Prix Interallié in 1937.

At the age of seven, he arrived with his parents in Franche-Comté, where he spent all his life. Several of his novels are devoted to his adopted region. He died in 1973.

== Some works ==
- 1937: La Vallée sans printemps — Prix Interallié.
- 1944: L'Herbe d'avril.
- 1946: La Tête à l'envers.
- 1947: Dieu est passé la nuit, nouvelles.
- 1947: Les Chemins des cercles.

== Bibliography ==
- Velay, Serge; Boissard, Michel; Bernié-Boissard, Catherine (2009). Petit dictionnaire des écrivains du Gard (in French). Nîmes: Alcide. pp. 217–218.
