= Christian Bujeau =

French actor and stage director (1944–2026)

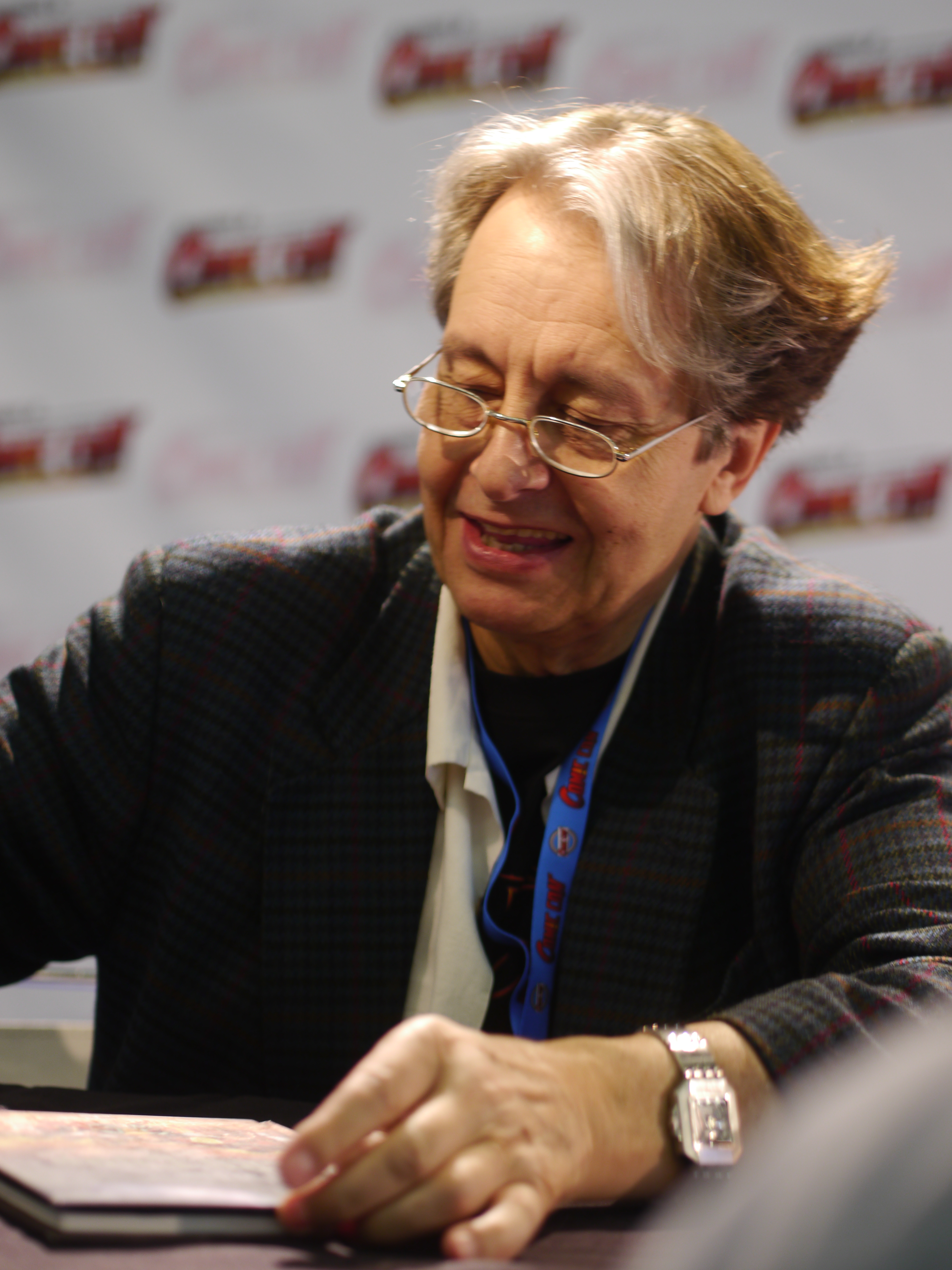
- Bujeau in 2013
- Born: 14 October 1944; Charron, France
- Died: 15 June 2026 (aged 81)
- Education: Conservatoire national supérieur d'art dramatique
- Occupations: Actor; Stage director

Christian Bujeau (French pronunciation: [kʁistjˈɑ̃ byʒˈo]; 14 October 1944 – 15 June 2026) was a French actor and stage director, best known for his roles in the film Les Visiteurs and the television series Kaamelott.

A graduate of the Conservatoire national supérieur d'art dramatique, he worked as a stunt performer. He was interviewed for the documentary Aux sources de Kaamelott, released in 2006 and 2010.

Bujeau died on 15 June 2026, at the age of 81.

== Selected filmography ==
=== Film ===
- Les Visiteurs (1993)
- The Machine (1994)
- Pédale douce (1996)
- L'Homme idéal (1997)
- Kings for a Day (1997)
- The Visitors II: The Corridors of Time (1998)
- Would I Lie to You? 2 (2001)
- The Red Inn (2007)
- Alibi.com (2017)
- Return of the Hero (2018)

=== Television ===
- Kaamelott (2004–2009)
- Hero Corp (2008–2013)
