= Natalia Wörner =

German actress (born 1967)

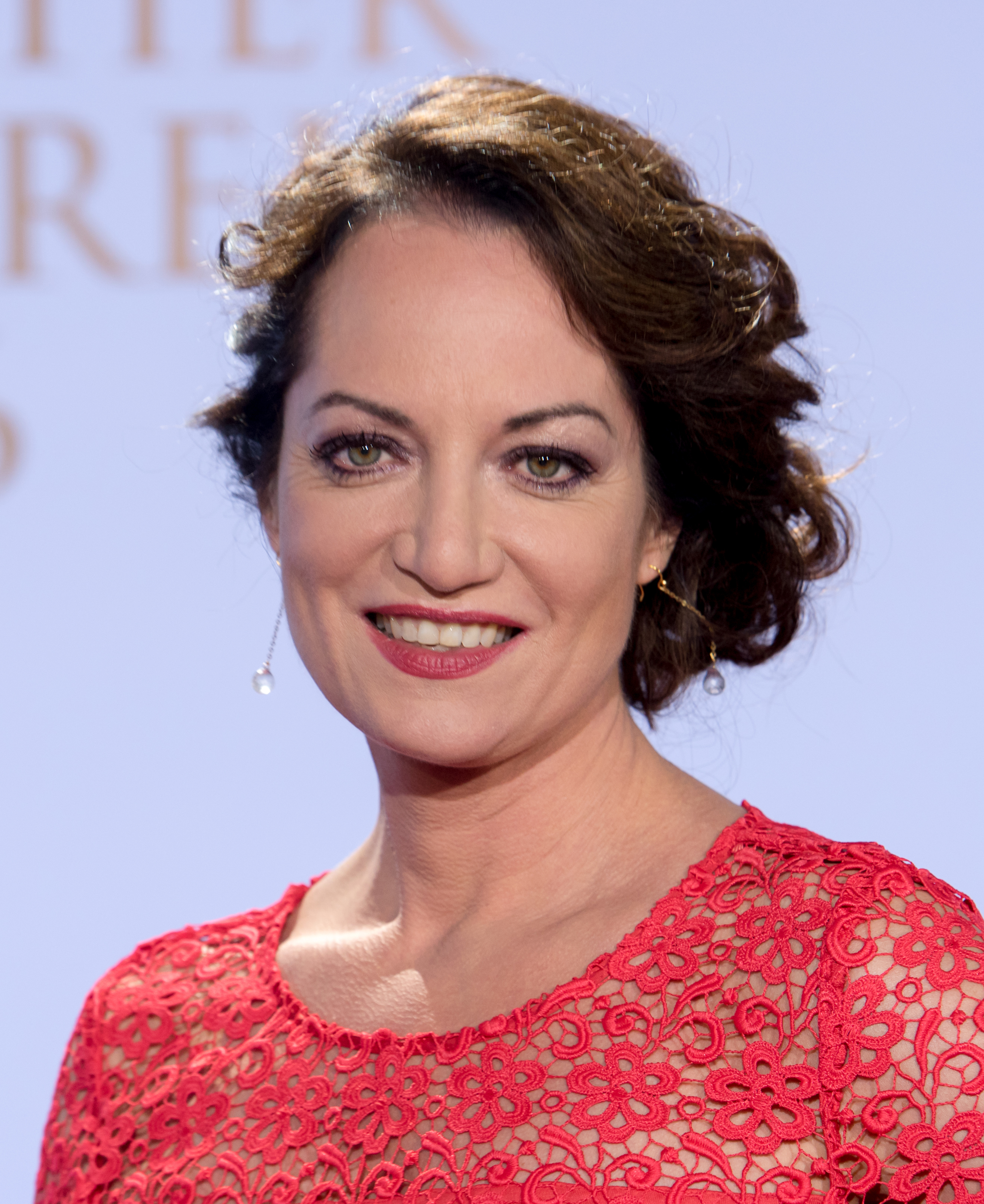
- Born: 7 September 1967 (age 59); Stuttgart, Baden-Württemberg, West Germany
- Occupation: Actress
- Years active: 1992–present
- Spouse: Robert Seeliger (2006–2008)
- Partner: Heiko Maas (2016–2023 (or earlier))
- Website: natalia-woerner.de

Natalia Wörner (German: [naˈtaːli̯a ˈvœʁnɐ]; born 7 September 1967) is a German actress. Her credits in English speaking television include The Pillars of the Earth (2009), and Berlin Station (2017).

== Biography ==
After finishing high school in Stuttgart, Wörner moved to New York City, where she studied acting at Lee Strasberg's Actors Studio. In 2000, she returned to Germany, where she won a German television award, the Deutscher Fernsehpreis, for best leading actress. She served on the award's jury in 2001 and 2002.

In 2009, Wörner played the role of Ellen, working alongside Ian McShane, Donald Sutherland, Rufus Sewell, and Eddie Redmayne in the TV miniseries The Pillars of the Earth, based on the eponymous book by Ken Follett. In 2012, she was given the role of Rebecca Kendall as one of the "other wives" in Rosamunde Pilcher's The Other Wife.

In 2017, she starred alongside Richard Armitage, Rhys Ifans, Ashley Judd, and Ismael Cruz Córdova in the Paramount Home Entertainment series Berlin Station.

== Other work ==
In addition to her acting career, Wörner has been a goodwill ambassador for German charity Kindernothilfe since 2006. She also served as ambassador of a 2010/2011 Pink Ribbon campaign in Germany. In 2015, Wörner accompanied Foreign Minister Frank-Walter Steinmeier on an official trip to South Korea and Indonesia. She later was a SPD delegate to the Federal Convention for the purpose of electing the President of Germany in 2017.

== Filmography ==
- 1992: Glück 1
- 1992: Thea und Nat
- 1994: Leni
- 1994: The Machine
- 1994: Women Are Simply Wonderful
- 1994: The Invincibles
- 1995: Der Elefant vergisst nie
- 1995: Kinder der Nacht
- 1996: Father's Day
- 1996: Tatort (episode: "Perfect Mind – Im Labyrinth")
- 1997: Spiel um dein Leben
- 1998: Der Rosenmörder
- 1998: Mammamia
- 1998: Zur Zeit zu zweit
- 1998: Der Handymörder
- 1998: Der Laden
- 1999: Zum Sterben schön
- 1999: Flames of Death
- 1999: Valley of the Shadows
- 1999: Tatort (episode: "Martinsfeuer")
- 2000: Frauen lügen besser
- 2001: Klassentreffen – Mordfall unter Freunden
- 2001: Verbotene Küsse
- 2003: Der Seerosenteich
- 2003: Wenn Weihnachten wahr wird
- 2003: Love and Desire
- 2004: Experiment Bootcamp
- 2004: Für immer im Herzen
- 2005: Miss Texas
- 2005: Das Geheimnis des Roten Hauses
- 2006: 20 Nächte und ein Regentag
- 2006: Storm Tide
- 2006: Der beste Lehrer der Welt
- 2006–2010: Unter anderen Umständen (series, 6 episodes)
- 2007: Durch Himmel und Hölle
- 2008: The Lie
- 2009: Mein Mann, seine Geliebte und ich
- 2009: Rosamunde Pilcher – Vier Jahreszeiten
- 2010: The Pillars of the Earth
- 2011: Cenerentola
- 2012: The Other Wife
- 2014: Iron Fist
- 2015: Tannbach
- 2017: Berlin Station

== Awards ==
- 1996: Golden Gong
- 2000: Deutscher Fernsehpreis
- 2011: Romy for The Pillars of the Earth (Die Säulen der Erde)
- 2016: Order of Merit of the Federal Republic of Germany
