= Marc Bernard =

French writer

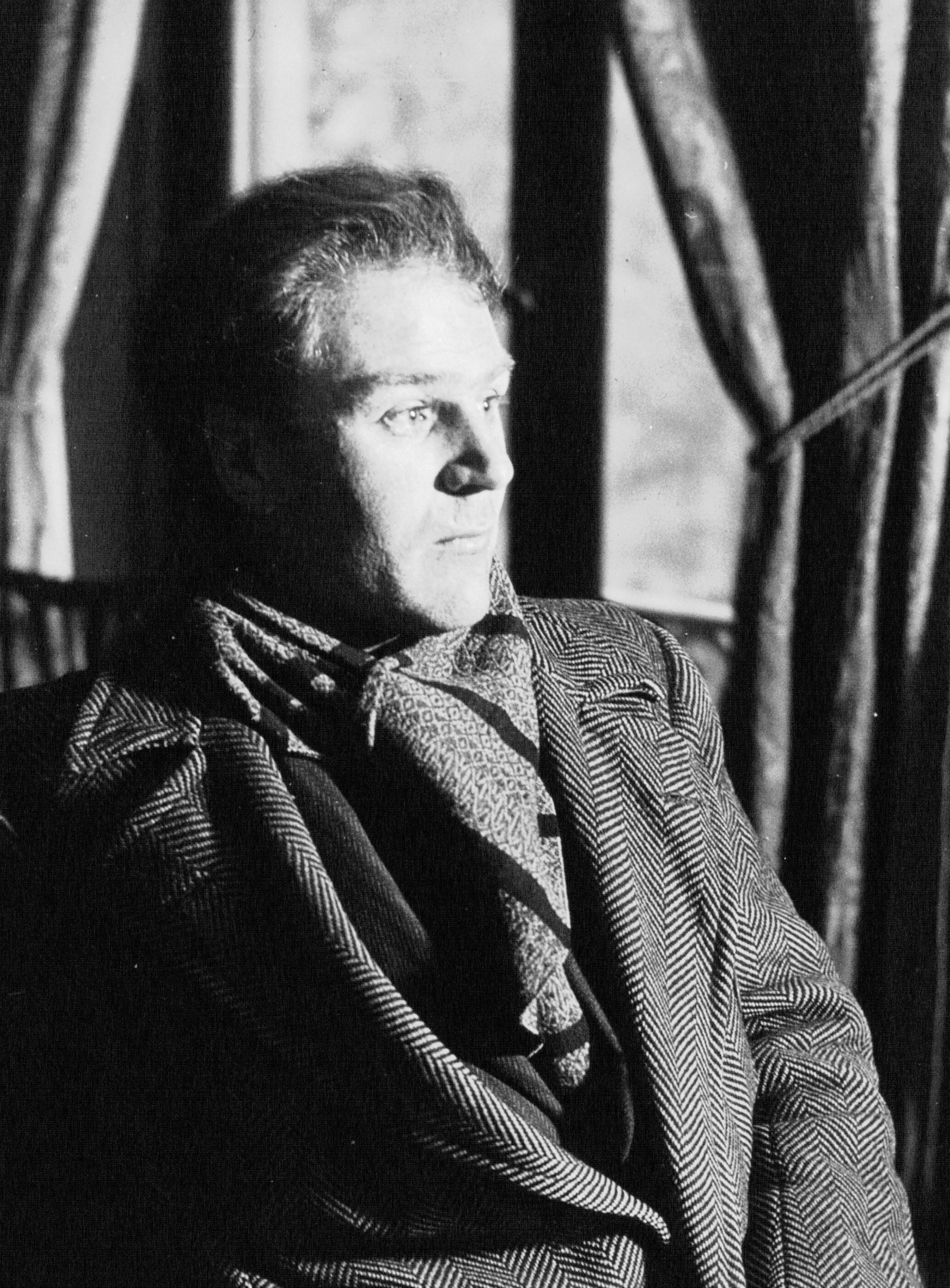
Marc Bernard in 1934

Marc Bernard (6 September 1900 in Nîmes – 15 November 1983 in Nîmes), was a French writer, the winner of the French literary prize Prix Interallié for Anny in 1943 and of the Prix Goncourt in 1942 for Pareils à des enfants.

== Life ==
Born in a working-class family, he became a delivery boy at age 12, then a metal worker. In 1929 he published a novel, Zig-zag, inspired by the surrealist movement, which brought him to the attention of Henri Barbusse. During the 1930s he wrote for Monde, a pro-communist newspaper, as a critic. He also co-authored short, sometimes intimate essays with his wife Else Reichman. The latter was an Austrian expatriate who held a PhD in literature but suffered from melanoma. A strong proponent of working-class literature, he founded "Le groupe des écrivains prolétariens" (The Group of Working-Class Writers) in 1932. For a short period he hosted a literary radio talkshow on National Radio.

During the 1960s he wrote for the "Figaro littéraire" (the weekly literary supplement to the daily newspaper Le Figaro).

In 1970 he was awarded the Grand Prix Poncetton for his work in general.

== Works ==
- 1929 - Zig-zag
- 1931 - Au secours
- 1934 - Anny
- 1936 - Rencontres
- 1939 - La Conquête de la Méditerranée
- 1939 - Les Exilés
- 1941 - Pareils à des enfants
- 1945 - Vert-et-argent
- 1946 - Les Voix
- 1947 - La Zone - conté inédit, illustré par Jean Boullet. Edité au benefice du Comité de L'Enfance Inadoptée de Nimes
- 1949 - La Cendre
- 1950 - Une Journée toute simple
- 1953 - Vacances
- 1955 - Salut, camarades
- 1957 - La Bonne humeur
- 1961 - Le Carafon
- 1964 - Sarcellopolis
- 1970 - Mayorquinas
- 1972 - La Mort de la bien-aimée
- 1976 - Au-delà de l'absence
- 1977 - Les Marionnettes
- 1979 - Tout est bien ainsi
- 1984 - Au fil des jours
