= Our War (2025 film) =

2025 Bernard-Henri Lévy documentary film

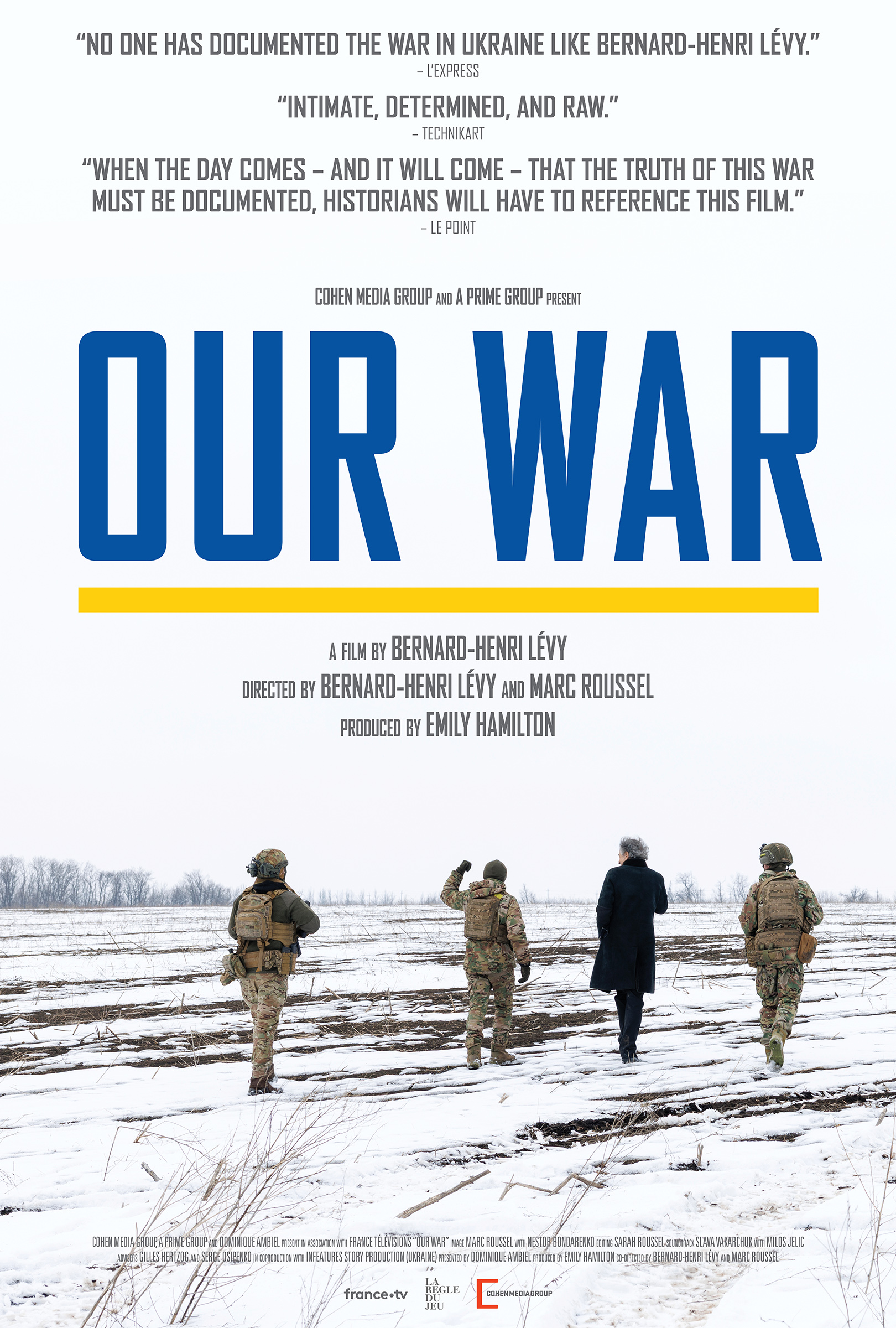
- American release poster
- French: Notre guerre
- Directed by: Bernard-Henri Lévy; Marc Roussel
- Screenplay by: Bernard-Henri Lévy
- Produced by: Emily Hamilton
- Edited by: Sarah Roussel
- Music by: Slava Vakarchuk
- Production companies: A Prime Group; France Télévisions
- Release dates: 13 May 2025 (Cannes); 4 June 2025 (France); 11 June 2025 (US)
- Running time: 80 minutes
- Country: France
- Language: Ukrainian

Our War (French: Notre guerre) is a 2025 French documentary film directed by Bernard-Henri Lévy and Marc Roussel. Shot between February and May 2025, the film is Lévy's fourth documentary about the ongoing Russian invasion of Ukraine after Why Ukraine, Slava Ukraini and Glory to the Heroes.

The film had its world premiere at the Ukraine Day section of the 78th Cannes Film Festival on 13 May 2025.

The film premiered on 24 June at Le Balzac theater in Paris, France.

Our War was broadcast on France 5 on 29 June 2025. It gathered over 375 000 viewers during its live broadcast.

== Synopsis ==
Bernard-Henri Lévy and Marc Roussel are filming the war in Ukraine between February and April 2025. From Pokrovsk to Sumy, they are following the soldiers' fight on the battlefield. Between meeting with Presidents Volodymyr Zelenskyy and Emmanuel Macron, the documentary relates the events on the front from the last couple of months as well as the heated meeting between Zelenskyy and Trump in Washington.

== Release ==
The movie premiered on 13 May 2025 as part of "Ukraine Day" during the 2025 Cannes Film Festival. On the same day, Cohen Media acquired the US rights of the movie. It was released theatrically on 11 June 2025 in the United States.

The movie premiere in Paris on 24 June 2025 at Le Balzac theater.

It was broadcast on 29 June 2025 on France 5.

== Reception ==
In The Bulwark, Cathy Young states: "It is the most powerful of the four films".
