= René Mauriès =

French journalist, reporter and writer

- Born: 16 February 1921; Mirandol-Bourgnounac (Tarn)
- Died: 23 May 1999 (aged 78); Toulouse
- Occupations: Journalist; Writer

René Mauriès (16 February 1921 – 23 May 1999) was a 20th-century French journalist, reporter and writer.

== Biography ==
After a bachelor's degree in letters, he began in 1945 with La République du Sud-Ouest as a war correspondent in Germany, then entered in 1949 in the daily newspaper La Dépêche du Midi where he accomplished his entire journalistic career. He carried out all activities, from reporter to sports columnist, notably on the Tour de France (thirty-seven tours covered), judicial columnist (from the Dominici affair to the Klaus Barbie trial), and finally editor-in-chief. It covered presidential trips. He was sent to all hot spots, Indochina, Algeria, Kurdistan, Iran, China ... He was friend with Joseph Kessel, Kléber Haedens, Antoine Blondin. His stories were rewarded with the prizes François-Jean Armorin in 1954 (for his articles about l'Indochine disponible), the Albert Londres Prize in 1956 for his reports on the Rif War, where he was wounded). At thirty-five, he was the only journalist to have received these two major awards for reporting. In 1967, he published in La Dépêche du Midi a series of reports on the genocide of the Kurdish peshmergas, Kurdistan ou la mort, later published in book. After the Munich massacre of 1972, which he saw closely, he recounted his romanticized experience in Le Cap de la Gitane which was awarded the prix Interallié in 1974.

In addition to his professional activities, René Mauriès carried out numerous social actions, particularly in the treatment of heart disease, including that of the "blue child" and multiple sclerosis.

He was vice-president of the École de journalisme de Toulouse. A prize bearing his name was established in 2006 to perpetuate his memory and to reward young journalists.

== Works ==
- 1967: Le Kurdistan ou la mort, J'ai lu
- 1974: Le Cap de la Gitane, Fayard, prix Interallié
- 1974: Toulouse, cité du destin, photographs by Jean Dieuzaide, Havas
- 1978: La Moreneta, La Table ronde
- 1992: Jean-Baptiste Doumeng, le grand absent, Éditions Milan
- 2001: Le Maître de mes secrets, Loubatières

== Prizes ==
- 1956: Prix Albert-Londres
- 1974: Prix Interallié
- 1974: Prix Henri Desgrange of the Académie des sports
