= Robert Bourget-Pailleron =

French journalist and writer

Robert Bourget-Pailleron (1897, Paris – 1970, Paris) was a 20th-century French journalist and writer, winner of the Prix Interallié in 1933 and the Grand prix du roman de l'Académie française in 1941.

== Works ==
- 1931: Champ secret
- 1932: Le Pouvoir absolu
- 1933: L'Homme du Brésil, Éditions Gallimard, Prix Interallié.
- 1936: Menaces de mort
- 1936: Les Clés de la caisse
- 1938: Conquête de la Bourgogne
- 1939: La Folie Hubert, Éditions Gallimard, Grand prix du roman de l'Académie française (1941).
- 1941: Le Chant du départ
- 1944: Les Journées de juin
- 1953: L'Enfant de minuit
- 1955: La Demoiselle de Viroflay
- 1956: Le Rendez-vous de Quimper
- 1958: Les Antiquaires
- 1961: La Colombe du Luxembourg
