= Roger de Lafforest =

French writer

Roger de Lafforest (11 January 1905, Paris – 16 November 1998) was a French writer. Lafforest has titles published and re-editions since 1927 in Czech, English, French, Portuguese, Slovak, Polish, and Spanish. He was bestowed with the Prix Interallié, a French award of literature in 1939.

== Works ==
- Des égards dus à la jeunesse (Considerations due to youth); co-author Paul Gilson, 1927.
- Kala-azar, 1930.
- Les Figurants de la mort (Death’s Extras), 1939. Reissue Éditions de l'Arbre vengeur, 2009.
- Si le ciel tombe... (If the sky is falling ...), 1942.
- La Cravate de chanvre... (Hemp necktie ...), 1953.
- Les perruques de Don Miguel (Dom Miguel’s wigs), 1955.
- Le sosie du prince (The prince’s double), 1966.
- L'Art et la science de la chance (Art and science of the luck), 1968.
- Ces maisons qui tuent (Houses that kill), 1970.
- La réalité magique (Magical reality), 1977.
- Les lois de la chance (Probability laws), 1978.
- Présence des invisibles (Invisible presences), 1983.
- La Magie des énergies (The magic of the energies), 1985.
- L'effet nocebo (The nocebo effect: Investigating ways and mechanisms of the remote influence), 1989.
- Signé -- Dieu (God’s sign: looking for a digital code to the harmony law which governs the world); co-author Jacques Langlois, 1992.
- L'arme absolue: la prière (The ultimate weapon: the prayer), 2001.
