= Simonne Ratel =

French writer

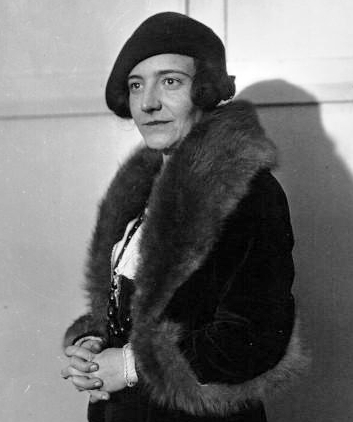
- Simonne Ratel in 1932
- Born: 22 July 1900; Sin-le-Noble
- Died: 22 November 1948 (aged 48); Rueil-Malmaison
- Occupation: Writer

Simonne Ratel (Note: Sometimes spelled Simone Ratel) (22 July 1900 – 20 November 1948) was a 20th-century French woman of letters. She was the winner of the 1932 edition of the prix Interallié.

== Works (selection) ==
- 1929: Trois parmi les autres
- 1930: Dialogues à une seule voix
- 1932: 0º Coktail
- 1932: Histoire du Poussin Chaussé, tale for children illustrated by Jacqueline Duché
- 1932: La Maison des Bories (novel), volume I of the "Isabelle Comtat" cycle – prix Interallié.
- 1932: Ben Kiki l'invisible
- 1933: Mlle Tarlatane en Amérique, tale for children illustrated by Jacqueline Duché
- 1934: Mlle Tarlatane au pays du cinéma, tale for children illustrated by Jacqueline Duché
- 1935: Le Raisin vert, volume II of the "Isabelle Comtat" cycle
- 1939: Contes du hérisson blanc
- 1940: La Fuite sous les bombes : récit d'une polonaise
- 1944: Contes de la terre et de la mer
