= The Best Butter =

1952 novel by Jean Dutourd

First US edition (publ. Simon & Schuster, 1955)

The Best Butter (French: Au bon beurre) is a 1952 novel by the French writer Jean Dutourd. It was published in the United Kingdom as The Milky Way. It tells the story of a Paris dairy shop during the German occupation, and how the politically uninterested manager adapts to the situation and collaborates whenever he finds it favorable. The novel satirizes the French attitude toward the occupation.

It received the Prix Interallié. It became a bestseller in France and sold more than two million copies. A film adaptation for TF1 directed by Édouard Molinaro was released in 1981.

== Publication ==
The book was published through éditions Gallimard on 10 September 1952. It was published in English in 1955, translated by Robin Chancellor. The American title is The Best Butter and the British title is The Milky Way.
