= Les Derniers Jours de Charles Baudelaire =

1988 novel by Bernard-Henri Lévy

- Author: Bernard-Henri Lévy
- Language: French
- Publisher: Éditions Grasset
- Publication date: 7 September 1988
- Publication place: France
- Pages: 348
- ISBN: 9782246401711

Les Derniers Jours de Charles Baudelaire ("the last days of Charles Baudelaire") is a 1988 novel by the French writer Bernard-Henri Lévy, about the life of the poet Charles Baudelaire.

The book was awarded the 1988 Prix Interallié. It was the runner-up for the Prix Goncourt the same year, having lost in the sixth voting round with four votes against five for Érik Orsenna's L'Exposition coloniale.
