= The Visitors II: The Corridors of Time =

1998 film by Jean-Marie Poiré

Les Visiteurs II: Les Couloirs du temps
- Theatrical release poster
- Directed by: Jean-Marie Poiré
- Written by: Jean-Marie Poiré; Christian Clavier
- Based on: Les Visiteurs by: Jean-Marie Poiré; Christian Clavier
- Produced by: Alain Terzian
- Starring: Christian Clavier; Jean Reno; Muriel Robin; Marie-Anne Chazel
- Cinematography: Christophe Beaucarne
- Music by: Eric Lévi; Felix Mendelssohn Bartholdy
- Production company: Gaumont
- Distributed by: Gaumont Buena Vista International
- Release date: 18 December 1998
- Running time: 118 minutes
- Country: France
- Language: French
- Budget: $23 million
- Box office: $66 million

Les Couloirs du temps: Les Visiteurs II (French pronunciation: [lɛ vizitœːʁ kulwaːʁ dy tɑ̃]; English: The Visitors II: The Corridors of Time) is a sequel to the original French film, Les Visiteurs. Les Visiteurs II was the second highest-grossing French film at the French box office for 1998.

== Plot ==
At his wedding, Godefroy de Montmirail is interrupted by the news that his bride's father, Duke Fulbert, is gravely ill. Consulting the wizard Eusebius, Godefory finds out that the corridors of time are somehow being held open and this is killing his future father-in-law. Godefroy is determined to find how this has happened and who is responsible. Back in present day, Jaquouille and Ginete rob a supermarket, and drive to Beatrice for work. Jean-Pierre, the dentist who is married to Beatrice, has many patients who Jacquouille scares away, so Beatrice decides to let him watch TV. He believes it is a work of devil, and destroys it and sets the house on fire. In the meantime, Jacquart is being tortured by the Inquisition by water cure. The inquisition shoves a funnel in his mouth and turns on a water pipe. Jacquart's belly begins rapidly growing to the point where his belly button pops out. He admits that Godefroy burnt his Range Rover (a reference to the first film), but the Inquisition believes that it was a person, Range Robert, and they are about to torture Jacquart further when Godefroy intervenes. In the future, Beatrice gives Jacquouille and Ginette the potion, and Jean-Pierre accidentally drinks one glass. She says the spell, and Jean-Pierre and Jacquouille fall in to the year 1123. Montmirail is being invaded, and he and Jacquouille fight the invaders. Godefroy is riding by, and he saves Jacquouille, but he sees that Jacquouille is wearing a huge ruby ring. Realising that Jacquouille stole the Duke's treasure and that the remaining items are in the future keeping the corridors of time open, they return, along with Jean-Pierre, and Jacquart. Jean-Pierre ends up in the forest, the others under the castle. They escape and terrorize the hotel, except for Jacquart who is urinating everywhere due to the water torture he underwent. Jaquouille and Godefory go to Ginette, who tried to turn in the rubies for money, and instead was beaten up. Cousin Hubert's ex-wife, Cora has the jewels, she tells them. They go to Cora's house, and take the jewels. In the morning, they go to Montmirail where a wedding is taking place. They create havoc at the wedding, by pouring ice cream into a woman's cleavage, and using a plunger to destroy the police chief's hat. They take the potion, and say the spell, but the potion has again been made wrongly, and they end up in 18th century France, during the French Revolution. Jacquouille sees his descendant, Jacqouillet, as an adviser to Napoleon Bonaparte, and screams to him as they are arrested as aristocrats.

== Cast ==
- Christian Clavier: Jacquouille la Fripouille / Jacques-Henri Jacquart / Prosper, Jacquouille's brother / Jacqouillet
- Jean Reno: Godefroy de Papincourt, count of Montmirail
- Muriel Robin: Frénégonde de Pouille / Béatrice de Montmirail
- Christian Bujeau: Jean-Pierre Goulard, Béatrice's husband
- Marie-Anne Chazel: Ginette the bum
- Claire Nadeau: Cora, wife of Hubert
- Jean-Paul Muel: Maréchal-des-Logis Gibon
- Sylvie Joly: Gisèle
- Arielle Séménoff: Jacqueline
- Michèle Garcia: Mrs. Frangin
- Armelle: Pétronille
- Élisabeth Margoni: Madame Lumeau-Péricard
- Philippe Nahon: Supermarket's owner
- Marie Guillard: Philippine de Pouille

== Reception ==
The film was released to generally mixed critical reviews. Some factors contributing to the disappointment of the French audience include the fact that some of the actors had been changed and that the film contained advertisements for various brands.

Despite this, it set an opening day record in France, grossing over $2.5 million from 550 screens and 427,291 admissions and also set a record with 2,665,916 admissions in its opening week. It sold more than eight million tickets in France being the second highest-grossing French film at the French box office for 1998 behind Le Diner de Cons.
