= Prix Interallié =

French literary award

The prix Interallié (Interallié Prize), also known simply as l'Interallié, is an annual French literary award, awarded for a novel written by a journalist.

== History ==
The prize was started on 3 December 1930 by about thirty or so journalists who were having lunch at the cercle de l'Union interallié (Interallied Union Club), who were waiting for the winner of the prix Femina to be announced.

The jury is composed of ten journalists, and the previous year's winner. The prize is generally awarded sometime in early November, after the prix Goncourt. Deliberations now take place at the Parisian restaurant, Lasserre. Although winning the Interallié usually helps a novel's sales, the prix Interallié is purely honorific, and no prize money is awarded.

== Winners ==
Year	Winner	Work	Publisher
1930	André Malraux	The Royal Way	Éditions Grasset
1931	Pierre Bost	Le Scandale	Éditions Gallimard
1932	Simonne Ratel	La Maison des Bories	Plon
1933	Robert Bourget-Pailleron	L'Homme du Brésil	Gallimard
1934	Marc Bernard	Anny	Gallimard
1935	Jacques Debu-Bridel	Jeunes Ménages	Gallimard
1936	René Laporte	Chasses de novembre	Éditions Denoël
1937	Romain Roussel	La Vallée sans printemps	Plon
1938	Paul Nizan	La Conspiration	Gallimard
1939	Roger De Lafforest	Les Figurants de la mort	Grasset
1945	Roger Vailland	Drôle de jeu	Éditions Corrêa
1946	Jacques Nels	Poussière du temps	Éditions du Bateau ivre
1947	Pierre Daninos	Les Carnets du Bon Dieu	Éditions de la Jeune Parque
1948	Henry Castillou	Cortiz s'est révolté	Fayard
1949	Gilbert Sigaux	Les Chiens enragés	Éditions Julliard
1950	Georges Auclair	Un amour allemand	Gallimard
1951	Jacques Perret	Bande à part	Gallimard
1952	Jean Dutourd	The Best Butter	Gallimard
1953	Louis Chauvet	Air sur la quatrième corde	Flammarion
1954	Maurice Boissais	Le Goût du péché	Julliard
1955	Félicien Marceau	Les Élans du cœur	Gallimard
1956	Armand Lanoux	Le Commandant Watrin	Julliard
1957	Paul Guimard	Rue du Havre	Denoël
1958	Bertrand Poirot-Delpech	Le Grand Dadais	Denoël
1959	Antoine Blondin	A Monkey in Winter	Éditions de la Table ronde
1960	Jean Portelle	Janitzia ou la Dernière qui aima d'amour	Denoël
1960	Henry Muller	Clem	La Table ronde
1961	Jean Ferniot	L'Ombre portée	Gallimard
1962	Henri-François Rey	Les Pianos mécaniques	Éditions Robert Laffont
1963	Renée Massip	La Bête quaternaire	Gallimard
1964	René Fallet	Paris au mois d'août	Denoël
1965	Alain Bosquet	La Confession mexicaine	Grasset
1966	Kléber Haedens	L'été finit sous les tilleuls	Grasset
1967	Yvonne Baby	Oui l'espoir	Grasset
1968	Christine de Rivoyre	Le Petit Matin	Grasset
1969	Pierre Schoendoerffer	Farewell to the King	Grasset
1970	Michel Déon	Les Poneys sauvages	Gallimard
1971	Pierre Rouanet	Castell	Grasset
1972	Georges Walter	Des vols de Vanessa	Grasset
1973	Lucien Bodard	Monsieur le Consul	Grasset
1974	René Mauriès	Le Cap de la Gitane	Fayard
1975	Voldemar Lestienne	L'Amant de poche	Grasset
1976	Raphaële Billetdoux	Prends garde à la douceur des choses	Éditions du Seuil
1977	Jean-Marie Rouart	Les Feux du pouvoir	Grasset
1978	Jean-Didier Wolfromm	Diane Lanster	Grasset
1979	François Cavanna	Les Russkoffs	Belfond
1980	Christine Arnothy	Toutes les chances plus une	Grasset
1981	Louis Nucéra	Le Chemin de la Lanterne	Grasset
1982	Éric Ollivier	L'Orphelin de mer… ou les Mémoires de monsieur Non	Denoël
1983	Jacques Duquesne	Maria Vandamme	Grasset
1984	Michèle Perrein	Les Cotonniers de Bassalane	Grasset
1985	Serge Lentz	Vladimir Roubaïev	Robert Laffont
1986	Philippe Labro	L'Étudiant étranger	Gallimard
1987	Raoul Mille	Les Amants du paradis	Grasset
1988	Bernard-Henri Lévy	Les Derniers Jours de Charles Baudelaire	Grasset
1989	Alain Gerber	Le Verger du diable	Grasset
1990	Bruno Bayon	Les Animals	Grasset
1991	Sébastien Japrisot	Un long dimanche de fiançailles	Denoël
1992	Dominique Bona	Malika	Mercure de France
1993	Jean-Pierre Dufreigne	Le Dernier Amour d'Aramis ou les Vrais Mémoires du chevalier René d'Herblay	Grasset
1994	Marc Trillard	Eldorado 51	Éditions Phébus
1995	Franz-Olivier Giesbert	La Souille	Grasset
1996	Eduardo Manet	Rhapsodie cubaine	Grasset
1997	Éric Neuhoff	La Petite Française	Éditions Albin Michel
1998	Gilles Martin-Chauffier	Les Corrompus	Grasset
1999	Jean-Christophe Rufin	Les Causes perdues	Gallimard
2000	Patrick Poivre d'Arvor	L'Irrésolu	Albin Michel
2001	Stéphane Denis	Sisters	Fayard
2002	Gonzague Saint Bris	Les Vieillards de Brighton	Grasset
2003	Frédéric Beigbeder	Windows on the World	Grasset
2004	Florian Zeller	La Fascination du pire	Flammarion
2005	Michel Houellebecq	The Possibility of an Island	Fayard
2006	Michel Schneider	Marilyn, dernières séances	Grasset
2007	Christophe Ono-dit-Biot	Birmane	Plon
2008	Serge Bramly	Le Premier Principe, le Second Principe	Éditions JC Lattès
2009	Yannick Haenel	Jan Karski	Gallimard
2010	Jean-Michel Olivier	L'Amour nègre	Éditions de Fallois
2011	Morgan Sportes	Tout, tout de suite	Fayard
2012	Philippe Djian	"Oh..."	Gallimard
2013	Nelly Alard	Moment d'un couple	Gallimard
2014	Mathias Menegoz	Karpathia	Éditions P.O.L
2015	Laurent Binet	La Septième Fonction du langage	Grasset
2016	Serge Joncour	Repose-toi sur moi	Flammarion
2017	Jean-René Van der Plaetsen	La Nostalgie de l'honneur	Grasset
2018	Thomas B. Reverdy	L'Hiver du mécontentement	Flammarion
2019	Karine Tuil	Les Choses humaines	Gallimard
2020	Irène Frain	Un crime sans importance	Seuil
2021	Mathieu Palain	Ne t'arrête pas de courir	Éditions de L'Iconoclaste
2022	Philibert Humm	Roman fleuve	Éditions des Équateurs
2023	Gaspard Koenig	Humus	Éditions de l'Observatoire
2024	Thibault de Montaigu	Cœur	Albin Michel
