= Bernard-Henri Lévy =

French public intellectual (born 1948)

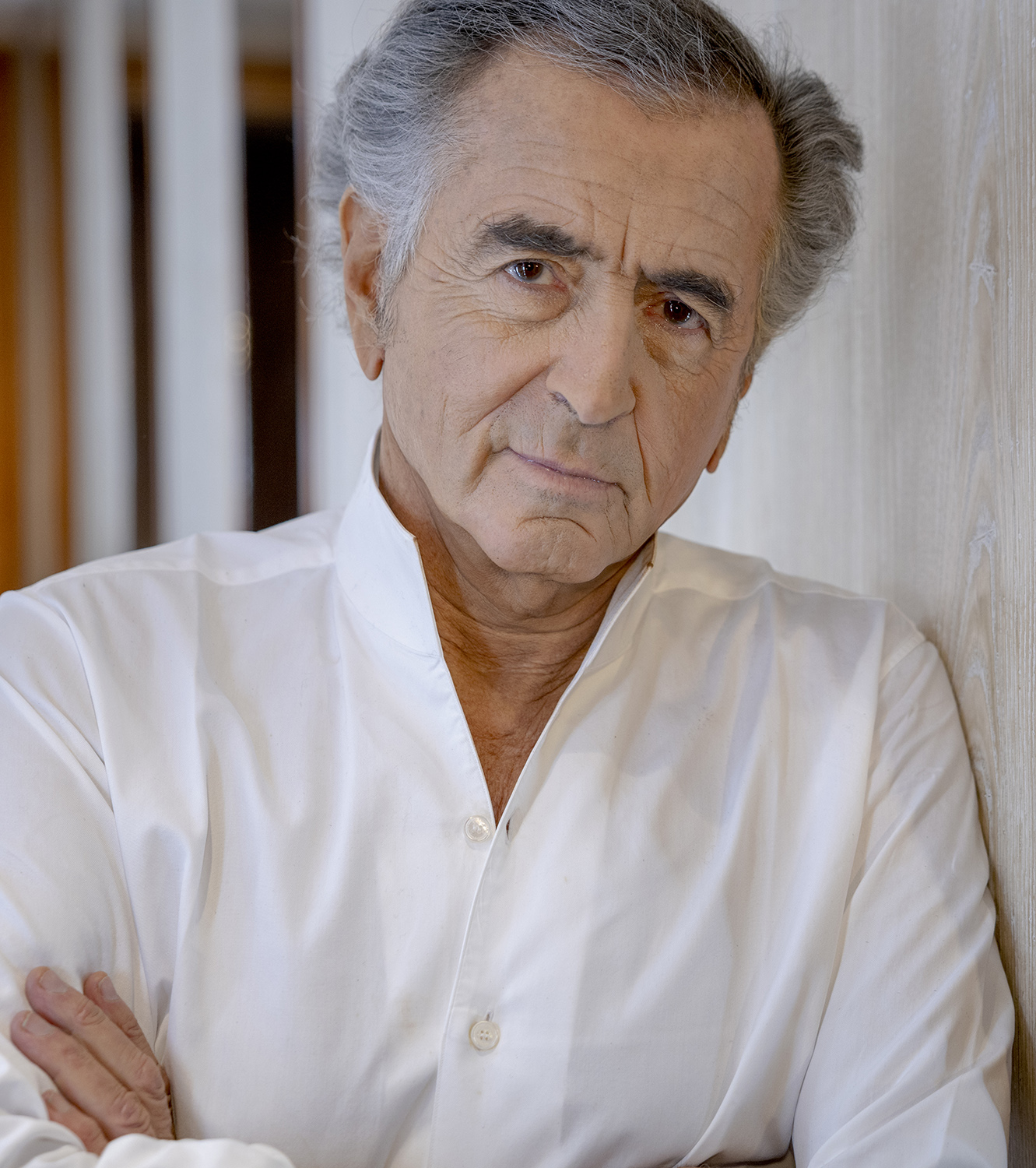
- Bernard-Henri Lévy in 2024
- Born: Bernard-Henri Georges Lévy; 5 November 1948 (age 77); Béni Saf, Oran, French Algeria
- Spouse(s): Isabelle Doutreluigne (divorced); Sylvie Bouscasse (divorced) Arielle Dombasle (m. 1993)

Education
- Education: École normale supérieure

Philosophical work
- Era: Contemporary philosophy
- Region: Western philosophy
- School: Continental philosophy Nouveaux Philosophes; Liberal internationalism
- Institutions: University of Strasbourg; École normale supérieure
- Main interests: Political philosophy
- Notable ideas: Criticism of red fascism

Bernard-Henri Georges Lévy (/leɪˈviː/; French: [bɛʁnaʁ ɑ̃ʁi ʒɔʁʒ levi]; born 5 November 1948) is a French public intellectual. Often referred to in France simply as BHL, he was one of the leaders of the "Nouveaux Philosophes" (New Philosophers) movement in 1976. His opinions, political activism, and publications have also been the subject of several controversies over the years.

== Life and career ==
=== Early life and career ===
Lévy was born in 1948 in Béni Saf, French Algeria, to an affluent Sephardic Jewish (Algerian-Jewish) family. His family moved to Paris a few months after his birth. He is the son of Dina (Siboni) and André Lévy, the founder and manager of a timber company, Becob, who became a multimillionaire from his business. He is the brother of Véronique Lévy.

Inspired by a call for an International Brigade to aid Bangladeshi separatists made by André Malraux, he became a war correspondent for Combat in 1971, covering the Bangladesh Liberation War against Pakistan. The next year he worked as a civil servant for the newly established Bangladesh Ministry of Economy and Planning. His experience in Bangladesh was the source of his first book, Bangla-Desh, Nationalisme dans la révolution ("Bangladesh, Nationalism in the Revolution", 1973). He visited Bangladesh again in 2014 to speak at the launch of the first Bengali translation of this book and to open a memorial garden for Malraux at Dhaka University.

=== New Philosophers ===
After his return to France, Lévy became a lecturer at the University of Strasbourg where he taught a course on epistemology. He also taught philosophy at the École normale supérieure. He was a founder of the New Philosophers (Nouveaux Philosophes) school. This was a group of young intellectuals who were disenchanted with communist and socialist responses to the near-revolutionary upheavals in France of May 1968, and who developed an uncompromising moral critique of Marxist and socialist dogmas.

=== Notable books ===
==== American Vertigo: Traveling America In the Footsteps of Tocqueville ====
External videos
- Discussion with Lévy on American Vertigo: Traveling America in the Footsteps of Tocqueville, January 24, 2006, C-SPAN

Although Lévy's books have been translated into the English language since La Barbarie à visage humain, his breakthrough in gaining a wider US audience was the publication of a series of essays between May and November 2005 for The Atlantic Monthly, later collected as a book. In preparation for the series, In the Footsteps of Tocqueville, Lévy crisscrossed the United States, interviewing Americans, and recording his observations, with direct reference to his acclaimed predecessor, Alexis de Tocqueville. His work was published in serial form in the magazine and collected as a book by the same title. The book was widely criticized in the United States, with Garrison Keillor publishing a damning review on the front page of The New York Times Book Review.

==== The Spirit of Judaism ====
External videos
- Presentation by Lévy on The Genius of Judaism, January 15, 2017, C-SPAN

In February 2016, Lévy published a book entitled L'Esprit du Judaisme. An English version, The Genius of Judaism, was published by Random House in January 2017. Liam Hoare wrote in Moment that the book examines "the humanism, ethics and politics of Judaism, as well as address[es] the issues of Israel and anti-Semitism in France today". The book's thesis is that Jews are a 'treasured people' because they are positioned to inform the world about truth and oppose evil. This is exemplified in the modern world by the accomplishments by the State of Israel and of French Jewry despite the presence of antisemitism in the Middle East and in France.

=== Notable movies ===
==== Peshmerga ====
Lévy's involvement with the Kurdish cause goes back to the early 1990s. On 16 May 2016, Bernard-Henri Lévy's new documentary film, Peshmerga, was chosen by the Cannes Film Festival as a special screening to its official selection. Lévy developed his vision of the Iraqi Civil War, through the Peshmerga fighters (Kurdish fighters armed by Westerners and fighting in particular against Daesh). It consists of images shot on the spot by a small team, especially with the help of drones. It portrays notably the female regiments of the Peshmerga army.

The movie itself is, as stated in its official Cannes presentation:

"The third part of a trilogy, opus three of a documentary made and lived in real-time, the missing piece of the puzzle of a lifetime, the desperate search for enlightened Islam. Where is that other Islam strong enough to defeat the Islam of the fundamentalists? Who embodies it? Who sustains it? Where are the men and women who in word and deed strive for that enlightened Islam, the Islam of law and human rights, an Islam that stands for women and their rights, that is faithful to the thinking of Averroes, Abd al-Qadir al-Jilani, Ibn Tufail, and Rumi? ..."

"Here, with this third film, this hymn to Kurdistan and the exception that it embodies, I have the feeling of possibly reaching my goal. Kurdistan is Sunnis and Shiites, Chaldeans, Assyrians, Aramaic-speaking Syrians living freely with Muslims, the memory of the Jews of Aqrah, secularism, freedom of conscience and belief. It is where one can run into a Jewish Barzani on the forward line of a front held, 50 kilometers from Erbil, by his distant cousin, a Muslim, Sirwan Barazi... Better than the Arab Spring. The Bosnian dream achieved. My dream. There is no longer really any doubt. Enlightened Islam exists: I found it in Erbil."

A year later, Lévy said that "Jews have a special obligation to support the Kurds", and that he hopes "they will come say to the Peshmerga: 'For years now you have spilled your blood to defend the values of our shared civilization. Now it is our turn to defend your right to live freely and independently.'"

==== The Will to See ====
This documentary, released in 2022, shows Lévy visiting several countries before and during the COVID-19 pandemic as he documents various atrocities and humanitarian crises.

==== Glory to the Heroes ====
Since 2022, Lévy made four documentaries on the Russian invasion of Ukraine: Why Ukraine, Slava Ukraini, Glory to the Heroes and Our War.

== Political activism and social involvement ==
=== 1980s and 1990s ===
In 1981, Lévy published L'Idéologie française ("The French Ideology"), in which he offers a dark picture of French history. It was strongly criticised for its journalistic character and unbalanced approach to French history by Marxism-critic Raymond Aron.

In the 1990s, Lévy called for European and American intervention in the Bosnian War during the breakup of Yugoslavia. He spoke about the Serb POW camps which were holding Bosniaks. He referred to the Jewish experience in the Holocaust as providing a lesson that mass murder cannot be ignored by those in other nations.

At the end of the 1990s, with Benny Lévy and Alain Finkielkraut, Lévy founded an Institute on Levinassian Studies at Jerusalem, in honour of Emmanuel Levinas.

=== 2000s ===
Through the 2000s, Lévy argued that the world must pay more attention to the crisis in Darfur.

In 2006, Lévy joined the British debate over Muslim women's veils by said to The Jewish Chronicle that wearing a veil had the effect of dehumanizing the wearer by hiding her face –and suggested, alluding to a passage by Emmanuel Levinas, that "the veil is an invitation to rape".

In August 2008, Lévy interviewed the President of Georgia, Mikheil Saakashvili, during the Russia-Georgian War.

In 2009, Lévy started a petition in support of film director Roman Polanski, calling for his release after Polanski was arrested in Switzerland in relation to his 1977 charge for drugging and raping a 13-year-old girl.

=== 2010s ===
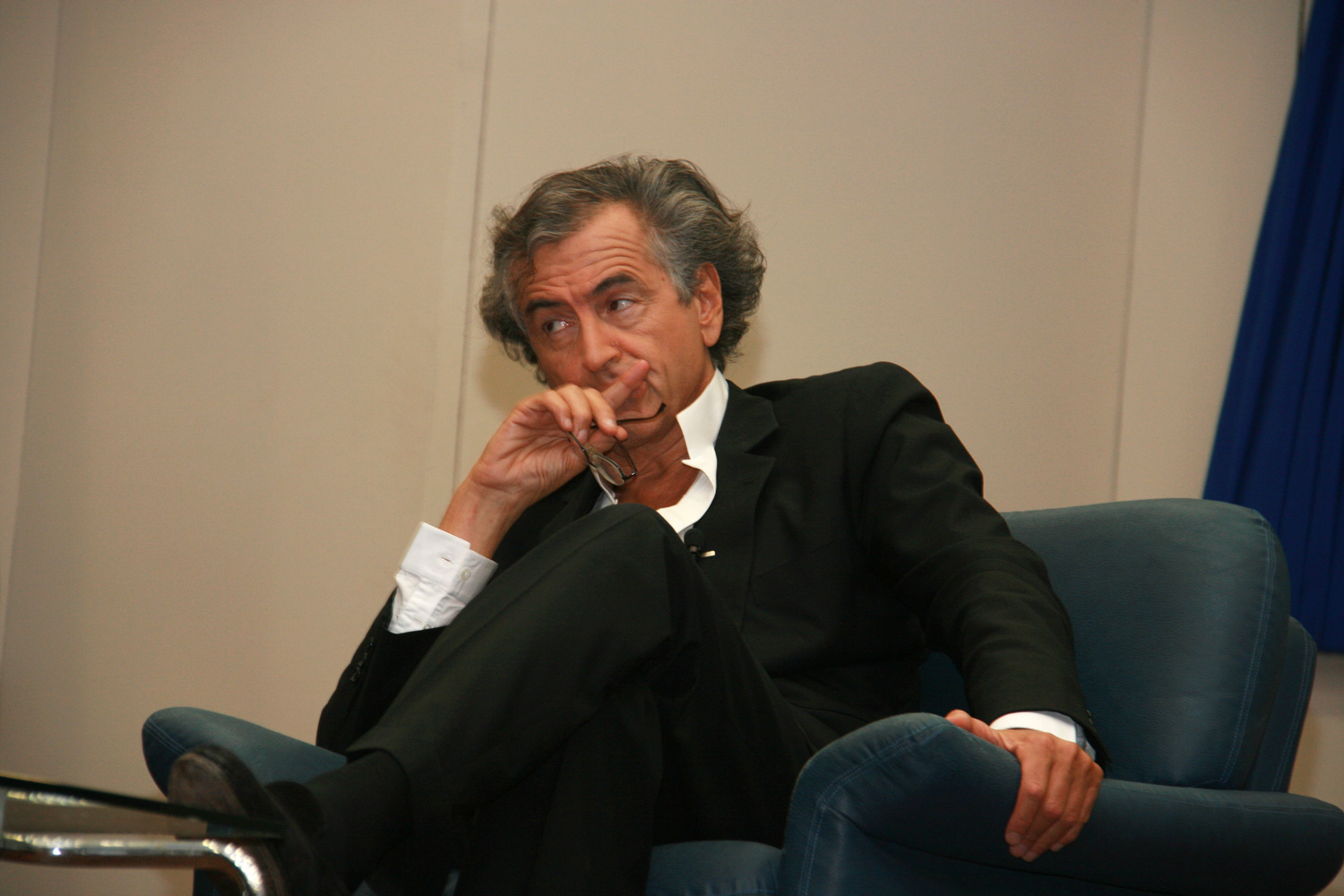
Bernard-Henri Lévy at Tel Aviv University

In January 2010, Lévy publicly defended Popes Pius XII and Benedict XVI against political attacks directed against them from within the Jewish community.

At the opening of the "Democracy and its Challenges" conference in Tel Aviv (May 2010), Lévy gave a very high estimation of the Israel Defense Forces, saying "I have never seen such a democratic army, which asks itself so many moral questions. There is something unusually vital about Israeli democracy."

In March 2011, he engaged in talks with Libyan rebels in Benghazi, and publicly promoted the international acknowledgement of the recently formed National Transitional Council. Later that month, worried about the 2011 Libyan civil war, he prompted and then supported Nicolas Sarkozy's seeking to persuade Washington, and ultimately the United Nations, to intervene in Libya, ostensibly to prevent a massacre in Benghazi.

In May 2011, Lévy defended IMF Chief Dominique Strauss-Kahn when Kahn was accused of sexually assaulting a chambermaid in New York City. Lévy questioned the credibility of the charges against Strauss-Kahn, asking The Daily Beast, "how a chambermaid could have walked in alone, contrary to the habitual practice of most of New York's grand hotels of sending a 'cleaning brigade' of two people, into the room of one of the most closely watched figures on the planet." He doubted the account of Tristane Banon who claimed Strauss-Kahn sexually assaulted her nine years prior. Levy says he holds it against those who "complacently" accept the account of "this other young woman, this one French", who "pretends to have been the victim of the same kind of attempted rape, who has shut up for eight years but, sensing the golden opportunity, whips out her old dossier and comes to flog it on television".

In May 2011, Lévy argued for military intervention in Syria against Bashar al-Assad after violence against civilians in response to the 2011 Syrian uprising. He repeated his position in a letter to the Weekly Standard in August 2013.

On 9 November 2011, his book, La guerre sans l'aimer, which tells the story of his Libyan spring, was published.

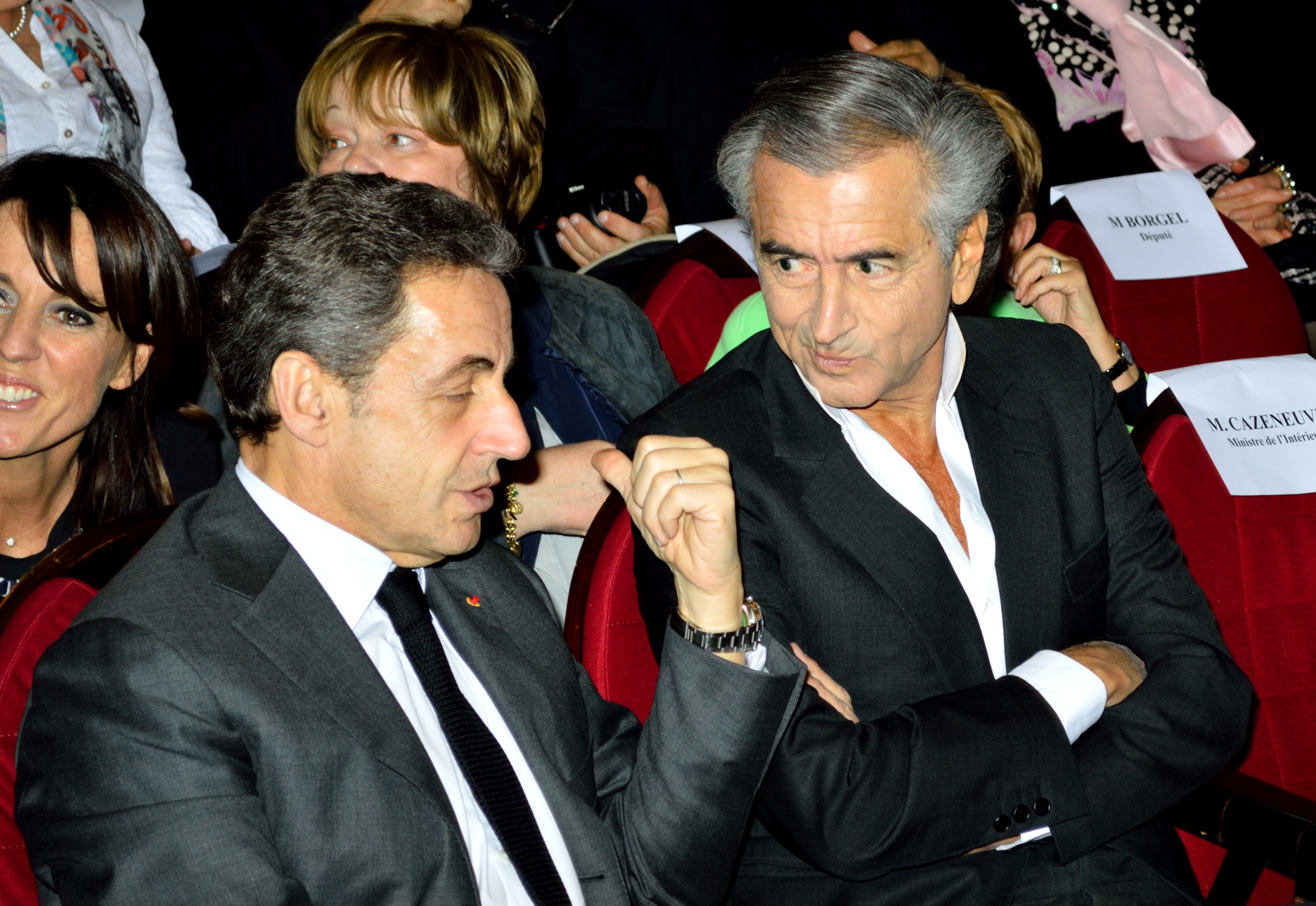
Lévy and Nicolas Sarkozy, at the commemoration of the Toulouse and Montauban shootings, 19 March 2015

In April 2013, he was convicted by a French court for libelling journalist Bernard Cassen.

In 2013, Lévy criticized the international community for their acts during the Bosnian genocide.

Levy travelled to Kyiv, Ukraine during the Euromaidan in February 2014, actively promoting the events. In February 2015, he performed his play Hotel Europa at the National Opera of Ukraine on the first anniversary of the Euromaidan's toppling of the government of Viktor Yanukovych.

In April 2014, he visited Bangladesh for the first time since 1972 to speak at the launch of the first Bengali translation of his first book Bangla-Desh, Nationalisme dans la révolution ("Bangladesh, Nationalism in the Revolution", 1973), and to open a memorial garden for Malraux at Dhaka University.

On 5 June 2018, he performed his one-man play Last Exit before Brexit at the Cadogan Hall in London. The play is a revised version of Hotel Europa and argues that Brexit should be abandoned.

In December 2019, Lévy visited the Autonomous Administration of North and East Syria, where he met Kurdish fighters led by General Mazloum Abdi.

=== 2020s ===
In July 2020, Lévy arrived on Misrata Airport in Libya, then he met some Government of National Accord officials; his visit was met with protests near Tarhuna.

Regarding the war between Israel and Hamas, Lévy wrote as reported in the French newspaper Le Figaro: "we need to say it again, the death of civilians in Gaza is not a massacre" (translated from original French: "il faut le redire, la mort des civils de Gaza n'est pas un massacre.") He wrote in WSJ: "A genocidal army doesn't take two years to win a war in a territory the size of Las Vegas. A genocidal army doesn't send SMS warning before firing or facilitate the passage of those trying to escape the strikes. A genocidal army would not evacuate, every month, hundreds of Palestinian children suffering from rare diseases or cancer, sending them to hospitals in Abu Dhabi as part of a medical airlift set up right after Oct. 7. To speak of genocide in Gaza is an offense to common sense, a maneuver to demonize Israel, and an insult to the victims of genocides past and present."

On 12 April 2024, after an investigation by Tunisian authorities, Lévy was accused of maintaining relations with Tunisian lobbyist Kamel Eltaïef and of having interceded to prevent the production of phosphate in Tunisia for the benefit of other countries in the region. He was also accused of having propagated "Masonic" ideology through charitable organizations and Tunisian personalities indicted in the case, in addition to working towards the normalization of relations between Tunisia and Israel and of being a "member of Mossad", the Israeli intelligence service. The investigating judge considered that he had sufficient evidence to initiate proceedings. On 19 April 2025, he was sentenced in absentia to 33 years in prison by a Tunisian court.

In October 2024, Lévy signed an open letter written by the pro-Israel organization Creative Community for Peace criticizing boycotts of Israeli authors and literary institutions over the Gaza war. The letter decried efforts to "demonize and ostracize Jewish authors across the globe".

In February 2025, Lévy acknowledged that Europe could not depend further just on the United States and NATO for defense, but advocated that Europe should fund and have its own army, under European command.

In June 2025, the New York Times described Lévy as "a French author and intellectual who has the ear of Mr. Macron", quoting Levy's advice to Macron that a Palestinian state "can only be envisaged after Hamas has laid down its arms, its commanders in Gaza have gone into exile, and the people of the West Bank and Gaza have renounced their murderous dream of a Palestine stretching from the sea to the Jordan border".

== Criticisms and controversies ==
Early essays, such as Le Testament de Dieu or L'Idéologie française faced strong rebuttals from noted intellectuals on all sides of the ideological spectrum, such as historian Pierre Vidal-Naquet and philosophers Cornelius Castoriadis, Raymond Aron, and Gilles Deleuze, who called Lévy's methods "vile".

More recently, Lévy was publicly embarrassed when his essay De la guerre en philosophie (2010) cited the writings of French philosopher Jean-Baptiste Botul. Botul's writings are actually well-known spoofs, and Botul himself is the purely fictional creation of a living French journalist and philosopher, Frédéric Pagès. The obviousness of the hoax, with Botul's philosophy being botulism, led to suspicions that Lévy had not read Botul, and that he consequently might have used a ghostwriter for his book. Responding in an opinion piece, Lévy wrote: "It was a truly brilliant and very believable hoax from the mind of a Canard Enchaîné journalist who remains a good philosopher all the same. So I was caught, as were the critics who reviewed the book when it came out. The only thing left to say, with no hard feelings, is kudos to the artist."

In the essay Une imposture française, journalists Nicolas Beau and Olivier Toscer claim that Lévy uses his unique position as an influential member of both the literary and business establishments in France to be the go-between of the two worlds, which helps him to get positive reviews as marks of gratitude, while silencing dissenters. For instance, Beau and Toscer noted that most of the reviews published in France for Who Killed Daniel Pearl? did not mention the strong denials about the book given by experts and by Pearl's own family including wife Mariane Pearl.

=== Who Killed Daniel Pearl? ===
External videos
- Interview with Lévy on Who Killed Daniel Pearl?, September 4, 2003, C-SPAN

In 2003, Lévy wrote an account of his efforts to track the murderer of Daniel Pearl, The Wall Street Journal reporter who was taken captive and beheaded by Islamic extremists the previous year. At the time of Pearl's death, Lévy was visiting Afghanistan as French President Jacques Chirac's special envoy. He spent the next year in Pakistan, India, Europe and the United States trying to uncover why Pearl's captors held and executed him. The resulting book, Who Killed Daniel Pearl?, argues it was because Pearl knew too much about the links between Pakistan's Inter-Services Intelligence and al-Qaeda. The book was strongly criticized by both experts and Pearl's own family, including wife Mariane Pearl who called Lévy "a man whose intelligence is destroyed by his own ego".

The book was condemned by William Dalrymple, a British historian of India and travel writer, and others, for its lack of rigour and its caricatured depictions of Pakistani society. Dalrymple also criticized Lévy's fictionalised account of Pearl's thoughts in the last moments of his life.

However, in an interview published in Newsline in April 2005, Omar Saeed Shaikh stated: "You can obtain details of my background from the book Who Killed Daniel Pearl? by Bernard Henri Levy [sic]. In this book Levy traces my entire life story; the references are usually negative, but he has done a lot of research."

=== Threats ===
Lévy was one of six Jewish public figures in Europe targeted for assassination by a Belgium-based Islamist militant group in 2008. The list included others in France such as Josy Eisenberg. That plot was foiled after the group's leader, Abdelkader Belliraj, was arrested on unrelated murder charges from the 1980s.

=== Pieing target ===
Lévy was targeted by the serial entarteur Noël Godin and his accomplices on at least eight occasions as a favourite target. Lévy's violent reactions to the pieings became the subject of numerous ridicule and parodies, including Benoît Poelvoorde's "Les Carnets de Monsieur Mantane", and Renaud's dedicated song in 2012. Godin believed Lévy to be arrogant, considering Lévy's statements claiming to be "the most gifted writer of my generation"; Levy's frequent boasts of reasonableness and tolerance were repeatedly challenged by media footage of himself covered in cream during a visit to Liège, trying to strangle Godin and shouting "Get up, or I'll kick your head in". Godin remarked on Lévy:

"He takes himself monstrously seriously (...) He is totally in love with himself to the most spectacular degree of imbecility."

Godin's campaign over the years became so effective that whenever Lévy's puppet on the satirical French television show Les Guignols de l'info began to speak, it was silenced by a cream tart. Godin promised to leave the philosopher alone only if he sang a silly song after the next attack.

=== Satirical portrayal in Asterix ===
In Asterix and the White Iris, Julius Caesar's personal advisor Libellus Blockbustus has been officially described as a caricature modelled on Lévy, among other contemporary French figures.

== Personal life ==
Lévy has been married three times. His eldest daughter by his first marriage to Isabelle Doutreluigne, Justine Lévy, is a best-selling novelist. He has a son, attorney Antonin-Balthazar Lévy, by his second wife, Sylvie Bouscasse. He is currently married to French actress and singer Arielle Dombasle. The affair between Lévy and English socialite Daphne Guinness was an open secret known amongst US society columnists since 2008. On 13 July 2010, Daphne Guinness confirmed the stories to Harper's Bazaar.

Lévy is Jewish, and he has said that Jews ought to provide a unique Jewish moral voice in society and politics.

Lévy has been friends with Nicolas Sarkozy since 1983. Relations between them deteriorated during Sarkozy's 2007 presidential run in which Lévy backed the Socialist candidate Ségolène Royal and also described Sarkozy as "A man with a warrior vision of politics". However, they grew closer again after Sarkozy's victory.

In 2004, Lévy's wealth was estimated at 150 million euros. The owner of seven companies, he inherited most of the fortune from his parents, which was complemented by stock exchange investments. In 2000, he was suspected of insider trading by the Commission des opérations de bourse.

== Written works ==
Lévy's works have been translated into many different languages; below is an offering of works available in either French or English.

- Bangla-Desh, Nationalisme dans la révolution, 1973 (reissued in 1985 under the title Les Indes Rouges).
- La barbarie à visage humain, 1977. Translated to English by George Holoch as Barbarism with a human face, New York : Harper & Row, 1979.
- "Response to the Master Censors". Telos 33 (Fall 1977). New York: Telos Press.
- Le testament de Dieu, 1978.
- Idéologie française, 1981.
- Le diable en tête, 1984.
- Eloge des intellectuels, 1987.
- Les Derniers Jours de Charles Baudelaire, 1988.
- Les aventures de la liberté, 1991; translated as Adventures on the Freedom Road: The French Intellectuals in the 20th Century, 1995, Harvill Press, ISBN 1-86046-035-6
- Le jugement dernier, 1992
- Piero della Francesca, 1992
- Les hommes et les femmes, 1994, with Françoise Giroud
- La pureté dangereuse, 1994.
- What Good Are Intellectuals: 44 Writers Share Their Thoughts, 2000, Algora Publishing, ISBN 1-892941-10-4
- Comédie, 1997.
- Le siècle de Sartre, 2000; translated by Andrew Brown as Sartre: The Philosopher of the Twentieth Century, 2003, Polity Press, ISBN 0-7456-3009-X
- Réflexions sur la Guerre, le Mal et la fin de l'Histoire, 2002; translated by Charlotte Mandell as War, Evil and End of History, 2004, Gerald Duckworth & Co. Ltd [UK], ISBN 0-7156-3336-8
- Qui a tué Daniel Pearl?, 2003; translated by James X. Mitchell as Who Killed Daniel Pearl?, 2003, Melville House Publishing, ISBN 0-9718659-4-9
- Récidives, 2004.
- American Vertigo: Traveling America in the Footsteps of Tocqueville, 2006, ISBN 1-4000-6434-1
- Ce grand cadavre à la renverse, 2007, Grasset, ISBN 2-246-68821-3; translated by Benjamin Moser as Left in Dark Times: A Stand Against the New Barbarism, 2008, Random House Publishing Group, ISBN 1-5883-6757-6
- Ennemis publics, 2008, with Michel Houellebecq; translated by Miriam Frendo and Frank Wynne as Public Enemies: Dueling Writers Take on Each Other and the World, 2011, Atlantic Books (UK), Random House (US), ISBN 0-8129-8078-6
- De la guerre en philosophie, 2010.
- La guerre sans l'aimer, 2011.
- L'esprit du judaïsme, 2016, Grasset; translated by Stephen B. Kennedy as The Genius of Judaism, 2017, Random House, ISBN 978-0-679-64379-1
- L'empire et les cinq rois, 2018, translated by Stephen B. Kennedy as The Empire and the Five Kings: America's Abdication and the Fate of the World, 2019, Henry Holt & Co, ISBN 978-1-250-20301-4.
- Ce virus qui rend fou: essai, Grasset, 2020.
- Sur la route des hommes sans nom, Grasset, 2021.
- The Will to See: Dispatches from a World of Misery and Hope, Yale University Press, 2021.
- Israel Alone, Wicked Son, 2024. ISBN 979-8-88845-783-2.
- Nuit Blanche, Grasset, 2025.

== Filmography ==
- Aurélien, directed by Michel Favart, 1978, actor
- Partir, revenir, directed by Claude Lelouch, 1985, actor (himself)
- Bosna !, 1994, director
- Day and Night, 1997, director, screenwriter and coproducer
- Serbie, année zéro, directed by Goran Marković, 2001, actor
- The Oath of Tobruk, directed by Bernard-Henri Lévy and Marc Roussel, documentaire, 2012
- Peshmerga, director, documentary, 2016
- The Battle of Mosul, director, documentary, 2017
- Princesse Europe, directed by Camille Lotteau, documentary, 2020
- The Will to see, directed by Bernard-Henri Lévy and Marc Roussel, documentary, 2021
- Why Ukraine, directed by Bernard-Henri Lévy and Marc Roussell, documentary, 2022
- Slava Ukraini, directed by Bernard-Henri Lévy and Marc Roussel, documentary, 2023
- Glory to the Heroes, directed by Bernard-Henri Lévy and Marc Roussel, documentary, 2023
- Our War, de Bernard-Henri Lévy et Marc Roussel, documentary, 2025
