= Glory to the Heroes (film) =

2023 documentary on the war in Ukraine

- French: L'Ukraine au cœur
- Directed by: Bernard-Henri Lévy; Marc Roussel
- Screenplay by: Bernard-Henri Lévy
- Produced by: Emily Hamilton
- Edited by: Sarah Roussel
- Music by: Slava Vakarchuk
- Production company: La Règle du Jeu
- Release date: 14 November 2023
- Running time: 90 minutes
- Country: France

Glory to the Heroes (version in Ukrainian: «З Україною в серці», romanized: Z Ukrainoiu v sertsi) is a documentary on the war in Ukraine directed by Bernard-Henri Lévy and Marc Roussel.

Shot over the summer of 2023, the film picks up where Lévy's two earlier documentaries in the country left off. Why Ukraine recounted the first phases of the Russian invasion in March and April 2022; Slava Ukraini was filmed in the second half of 2022 during the Ukrainian military's counteroffensive against the Russians.

L'Ukraine au cœur premiered in France on November 14, 2023, on France 2.

The English-language version, Glory to the Heroes, was opened in the United States on December 6 at UN headquarters in New York.

== Synopsis ==
Between June and September 2023, Bernard-Henri Lévy and his team produced a documentary film in the form of a war journal chronicling the Ukrainian people's resistance to the Russian military. The film is a sequel to two earlier documentaries in the same format.

Glory to the Heroes attests to the courage and solidarity of Ukrainian soldiers and civilians during this period of severe trial, both on the front lines and behind the lines in the everyday life of towns and cities subjected to Russian bombardment.

Parts of the documentary are filmed in the trenches of Kherson, Olevs’k, and, especially, Bakhmut, at the very edges of the fight against the Russian forces. The film records attacks by drones, rockets, and automatic weapons.

Glory to the Heroes also documents the commitment of international fighters on the Ukrainian front. Israeli, British, and French volunteers who consider this war their own are shown fighting for democracy over barbarism.

== Reception ==
=== Reception of the film in France ===
“In his documentary L’Ukraine au cœur, released on France 2, [Bernard-Henri Lévy] celebrates the courage of a people standing on the front line against Putin, writes Danièle Georget in Paris Match. She continues: “Courage is the only form of ammunition the Ukrainians are not lacking”.

“BHL delivers images of exceptional intensity that depict a war of attrition in which munitions are running low, and men as well, but where the determination of the Ukrainian people remains intact," observe Charles Haquet and Éric Chol in L’Express.

“The philosopher (Lévy) sets out to demonstrate the heroism of citizens who have become combattants motivated by an ideal: ‘I have been covering this war since its first weeks,’ Lévy says, ‘and what strikes me is the unflagging morale of the Ukrainians, which commands respect.’ On one side, an army that doesn't know why it's fighting; on the other, a force imbued with transcendent values,” reports Isabelle Malin for Franceinfo.

“Bernard-Henri Lévy has produced his third film about Ukraine, a moving front line journal that is a veritable hymn to this nation of citizen soldiers who have mobilized to resist the Russian invader," observes Laure Mandeville in Le Figaro.

“The philosopher (Lévy) continues to amass images and accounts that force his contemporaries to come to terms with what is happening in and around Kherson, Mariupol, Donetsk, and Kharkiv, the worst conflict on the European continent since 1945," according to Sébastien Lapaque in Le Point.

“With his documentary, L’Ukraine au cœur, BHL is refusing to give up," notes Alexandra Schwartzbrod in Libération. "This film, which we can be sure will be seen by all those who need to see it, given BHL’s determination, possesses the immense value of illustrating the havoc that this war continues to wreak at the gates of Europe, even as the focus has shifted since October 7 to another war, the one between Israel and Hamas".

“The Ukrainian tragedy takes the form of an SOS aimed at heart and mind—and against forgetting," writes Florence Tredez in Elle.

“The best way of resisting is to not forget Ukraine, the democracies’ front line. Whence the importance of Bernard-Henri Lévy’s film. As always, the envious and the blind will mock him without watching it. Don’t listen to them. This very successful documentary reveals better than evanescent news reports the existential drama of this conflict—as well as its humanity," Caroline Fourest points out in Franc-Tireur.

“Bernard-Henri Lévy shared the everyday hell of Ukrainian citizen soldiers," notes Louis-David Texier in Transfuge. "An exceptional lesson in courage and freedom offered by an exemplary, worthy people.

For Sara Daniel in L’Obs, the film attests to the unwavering support offered to the Ukrainians by "a man no longer young who surveys their front lines up close, rubbing elbows with artillery units and drone pilots, as if determined to risk death to pay tribute to the courage of these freedom fighters".

“Finally, the philosopher does not hide his affinity for the foreign volunteers, ‘the free spirits,’ who have come to fight at Europe’s eastern limits. Among them are two Israeli reservists in the IDF. Another war, triggered by Hamas’ attack on October 7, has since called them back to their country," observes Christel Brigaudeau in Le Parisien.

=== Reception of the film in the United States ===
Following its prime time premiere on France 2, the documentary will hit the big screen in the United States on December 6, 2023, with a preview at the New York City headquarters of the United Nations.

The title of the film will change with its premiere in the United States. Glory to the Heroes opens for general audiences on December 8 in New York City, followed by premieres in Washington, Los Angeles, then in Chicago, Philadelphia, and Seattle. Lévy will be present for the screenings in New York, Los Angeles, and Washington, DC.

"What struck me is how necessary documentaries like Levy’s are. [...] it is a different experience to watch a 90-minute film where we view the devastation firsthand" writes Tom Teicholz in Forbes.
