= René Belletto =

French novelist (1945–2026)

René Belletto (11 September 1945 – 25 October 2026) was a French writer, and winner of the Prix Femina, 1986, for L'Enfer.

He was born in Lyon on 11 September 1945, and died on 25 October 2026, at the age of 81.

== English language editions ==
- Dying
