= Voldemar Lestienne =

French writer and journalist

Voldemar Lestienne (2 December 1931 – 1 December 1990 in Paris) was a French writer and journalist, winner of the 1975 prix Interallié.

== Biography ==
Voldemar Lestienne is a journalist and a reporter before becoming deputy editor-in-chief of the newspaper France-Soir and then deputy director of France Dimanche. At the same time, he wrote a career as a writer with two successful sales novels, Furioso and Fracasso - transpositions of Dumas's Three Musketeers in the context of the Second World War, and was rewarded by the Prix Interallié for L'Amant de poche (1975) and which was his latest novel though.

== Work ==
- 1958: Dillinger
- 1958: Furioso
- 1973: Fracasso, Livre de Poche, ISBN 2253007641
- 1975: L'Amant de poche — Éditions Grasset, ISBN 2246002613, Prix Interallié
