= Jean-Pierre Dufreigne =

French writer and journalist

Jean-Pierre Dufreigne is a contemporary French writer and journalist, laureate of the 1993 Prix Interallié.

== Work ==
- 1993: Le Dernier Amour d'Aramis, Éditions Grasset, ISBN 2246428211, Prix Interallié
- 2002: Louis XIV : Le lever du soleil
- 2003: Louis XIV : Les passions et la gloire
- 2007: Napoléon III - vol. 1 Un si charmant jeune homme... & vol. 2 L'Empereur qui rêvait..., Plon
