= Mathias Menegoz =

French writer of Hungarian origin (born 1968)

Mathias Menegoz (born 1968) is a French writer of Hungarian origin.

== Biography ==
He is the son of director Robert Ménégoz and producer Margaret Ménégoz.

Mathias Menegoz holds a doctorate in neurobiochemistry from the University of Paris V before abandoning research and devoting himself to writing.

He was awarded the prix Interallié in 2014 for his first novel, Karpathia.

== Works ==
- 2014: Karpathia, Paris, P.O.L, 704 p. ISBN 978-2-8180-2076-0.

- Prix Interallié 2014.
