= Jean Dutourd =

French novelist (1920–2011)

- Born: 14 January 1920; Paris, France
- Died: 17 January 2011 (aged 91); Paris, France
- Education: Lycée Janson-de-Sailly; University of Paris
- Occupation: Writer
- Known for: Member of the Académie française

Jean Gwenaël Dutourd (French: [dytuʁ]; 14 January 1920 – 17 January 2011) was a French novelist.

== Biography ==
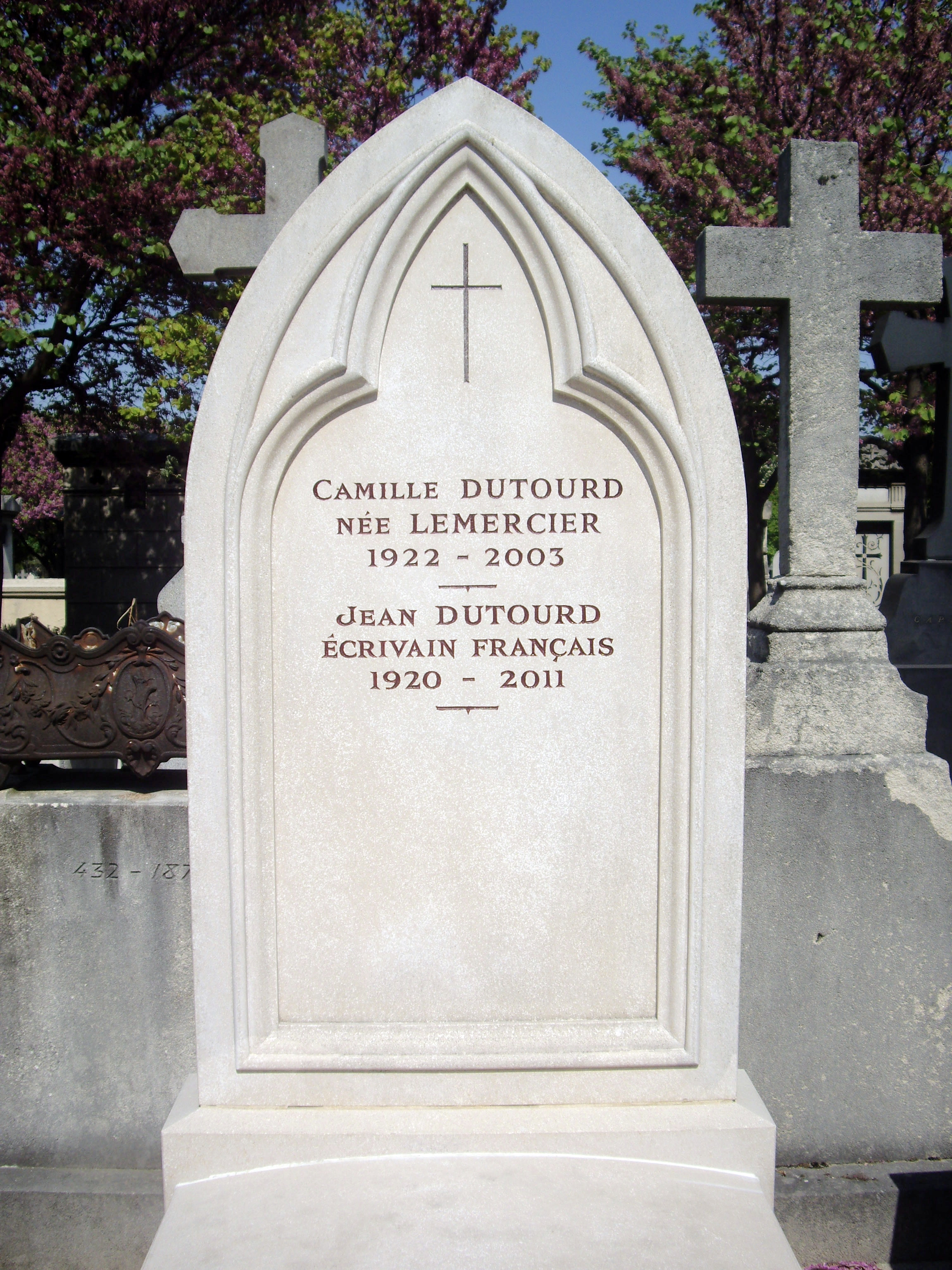
Dutourd's gravestone in Montparnasse Cemetery

Dutourd was born in Paris. His mother died when he was seven years old. At the age of twenty, he was taken prisoner fifteen days after Germany's invasion of France in World War II. He escaped six weeks later and returned to Paris where he studied philosophy at the Sorbonne. He entered the Resistance and was again arrested in early 1944. He escaped and took part in the Liberation of Paris. He was a candidate for the Democratic Union of Labour (UDT) in the legislative elections of 1967.

His first work, Le Complexe de César, appeared in 1946 and received the Prix Stendhal.

On 14 July 1978, a bomb destroyed his apartment, planted by people who disliked his writing style. Parisian intellectuals were somewhat dismayed, as they had not generally caused such a stir with their own writings. This incident, however, had a happy consequence: Jean Dutourd was elected to the Académie française, to the seat of Jacques Rueff, on 30 November the same year (seat 31)retrieved 18/1/2026, https://web.archive.org/web/20110120192356/http://www.lepost.fr/article/2011/01/18/2374655_mort-le-l-ecrivain-jean-dutourd.html.

In 1997 he was elected as a member of Serbian Academy of Sciences and Arts in the Department of Language and Literature.

Dutourd died in Paris on 17 January 2011, at the age of 91.

== Bibliography ==
- 1946 Le Complexe de César (Gallimard)
- 1947 Le Déjeuner du lundi (Gallimard)
- 1947 Galère (Éd. des Granges-Vieilles)
- 1948 L’Arbre (Gallimard)
- 1950 Une tête de chien (Gallimard) [In English: "A Dog's Head: A Novel" tr. Robin Chancellor (1951) (ISBN 9780226174921)]
- 1950 Le Petit Don Juan, traité de la séduction (Robert Laffont)
- 1952 Au bon beurre, scènes de la vie sous l'Occupation (Gallimard) [Two titles in English: "The Milky Way" tr. Robin Chancellor (Museum Press, 1955, UK); "The Best Butter" (Simon & Schuster, 1955, US)]
- 1955 Doucin (Gallimard) [In English: "Five A.M." tr. Robin Chancellor (Simon & Schuster, 1956)]
- 1956 Les Taxis de la Marne (Gallimard) [In English: "The Taxis of the Marne" tr. Harold King (Simon & Schuster, 1957)]
- 1958 Le Fond et la Forme, essai alphabétique sur la morale et sur le style (Gallimard)
- 1959 Les Dupes (Gallimard)
- 1959 L’Âme sensible (Gallimard) [In English: "The Man of Sensibility" tr. Robin Chancellor (Simon & Schuster, 1961)]
- 1960 Le Fond et la Forme, tome II (Gallimard)
- 1963 Rivarol, essai et choix de textes (Mercure de France)
- 1963 Les Horreurs de l’amour (Gallimard) [In English: "The Horrors of Love" tr. Robin Chancellor (Doubleday, 1967)]
- 1964 La Fin des Peaux-Rouges (Gallimard) [In English: "The Last of the Redskins" tr. Grace T. Mayes (Doubleday, 1965)]
- 1965 Le Demi-Solde (Gallimard)
- 1965 Le Fond et la Forme, tome III (Gallimard)
- 1967 Pluche ou l’Amour de l’art (Flammarion) [In English: "Pluche, or The Love of Art" tr. Robin Chancellor (Doubleday, 1970)]
- 1969 Petit Journal 1965-1966 (Julliard)
- 1970 L’École des jocrisses (Flammarion)
- 1971 Le Crépuscule des loups (Flammarion)
- 1971 Le Paradoxe du critique (Flammarion)
- 1972 Le Printemps de la vie (Flammarion) [In English: "The Springtime of Life" tr. Denver and Helen Lindley (Doubleday, 1974)]
- 1972 Le Paradoxe du critique, suivi de Sept Saisons (Flammarion)
- 1973 Carnet d’un émigré (Flammarion)
- 1976 2024 (Gallimard)
- 1977 Mascareigne (Julliard)
- 1977 Cinq ans chez les sauvages (Flammarion)
- 1978 Les Matinées de Chaillot (SPL)
- 1978 Les Choses comme elles sont (Stock)
- 1979 Œuvres complètes, tome I (Flammarion)
- 1980 Mémoires de Mary Watson (Flammarion)
- 1980 Le Bonheur et autres idées (Flammarion)
- 1981 Un ami qui vous veut du bien (Flammarion)
- 1982 De la France considérée comme une maladie (Flammarion )
- 1983 Henri ou l’Éducation nationale (Flammarion)
- 1983 Le Socialisme à tête de linotte (Flammarion)
- 1984 Œuvres complètes, tome II (Flammarion)
- 1984 Le Septennat des vaches maigres (Flammarion)
- 1985 Le Mauvais Esprit, entretiens avec J.-É. Hallier (Olivier Orban)
- 1985 La Gauche la plus bête du monde (Flammarion)
- 1986 Conversation avec le Général (Michèle Trinckvel)
- 1986 Contre les dégoûts de la vie (Flammarion)
- 1986 Le Spectre de la rose (Flammarion)
- 1987 Le Séminaire de Bordeaux (Flammarion)
- 1989 Ça bouge dans le prêt à porter (Flammarion)
- 1990 Conversation avec le Général (Flammarion)
- 1990 Loin d’Édimbourg (Le Fallois)
- 1990 Les Pensées (Le Cherche-Midi)
- 1991 Portraits de femmes (Flammarion)
- 1992 Vers de circonstances (Le Cherche-Midi)
- 1993 L’Assassin (Flammarion)
- 1994 Domaine public (Flammarion)
- 1994 Le Vieil Homme et la France (Flammarion)
- 1995 Le Septième Jour, récits des temps bibliques (Flammarion )
- 1996 Le Feld Maréchal von Bonaparte (Flammarion)
- 1996 Scènes de genre et tableaux d’époque (Guy Trédaniel)
- 1997 Scandale de la vertu (Le Fallois)
- 1997 Trilogie française (Le Séminaire de Bordeaux, Portraits de femmes, l'Assassin) (Flammarion)
- 1997 Journal des années de peste : 1986-1991 (Plon)
- 1998 Grand chelem à cœur (Le Rocher)
- 1999 À la recherche du français perdu (Plon)
- 2000 Jeannot, mémoires d’un enfant (Plon)
- 2001 Le Siècle des Lumières éteintes (Plon)
- 2002 Dutouriana (Plon)
- 2004 Journal intime d'un mort (Plon)
- 2006 Les perles et les cochons (Plon)
- 2007 : Leporello (Plon) (ISBN 2259206050)
- 2008 : La grenade et le suppositoire (Plon) (ISBN 9782259208000)

== Translations ==
L'Œil d'Apollon, by G. K. Chesterton; Les Muses parlent, by Truman Capote; and Le Vieil Homme et la Mer, by Ernest Hemingway.
