= Philibert Humm =

French novelist and journalist

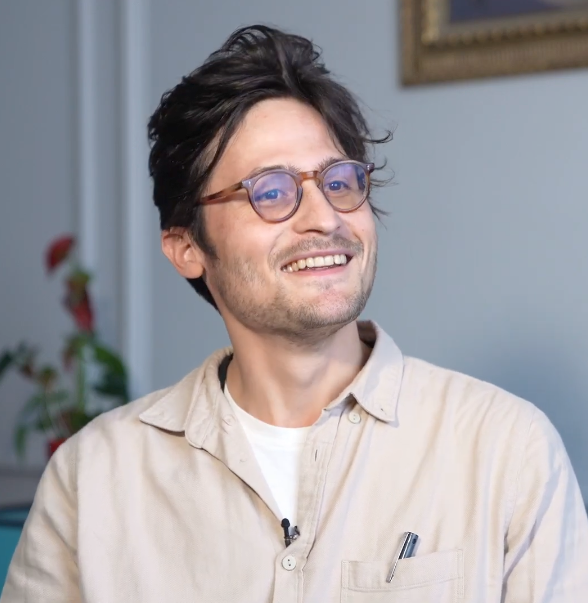
- In a 2024 interview
- Born: 27 October 1991 (age 34)
- Occupations: novelist; journalist
- Notable work: Roman fleuve

Philibert Humm (born 27 October 1991) is a French novelist and journalist.

Humm wrote for Paris Match and published three books of travel literature about France before his debut novel Roman fleuve (lit. 'River Novel') was published in 2022. A humorous tale about three friends who travel along the Seine in canoes, it is partially a hommage to Jerome K. Jerome's Three Men in a Boat and uses playfully archaic language. Roman fleuve was awarded the 2022 Prix Interallié.

He followed the debut with Roman de gare (lit. 'Station Novel') in 2024 and Roman policier (lit. 'Police Novel') in 2025. These novels are characterised by a similar sense of humour.

== List of works ==
- Le Tour de la France par deux enfants d'aujourd'hui, Équateurs (2018)
- Les tribulations d'un Français en France, Les Éditions du rocher (2021)
- La Micheline : Tournée des bars de France, Équateurs (2021)
- Roman fleuve, Équateurs (2022)
- Roman de gare, Équateurs (2024)
- Roman policier, Équateurs (2025)
