= Carla Bruni discography =

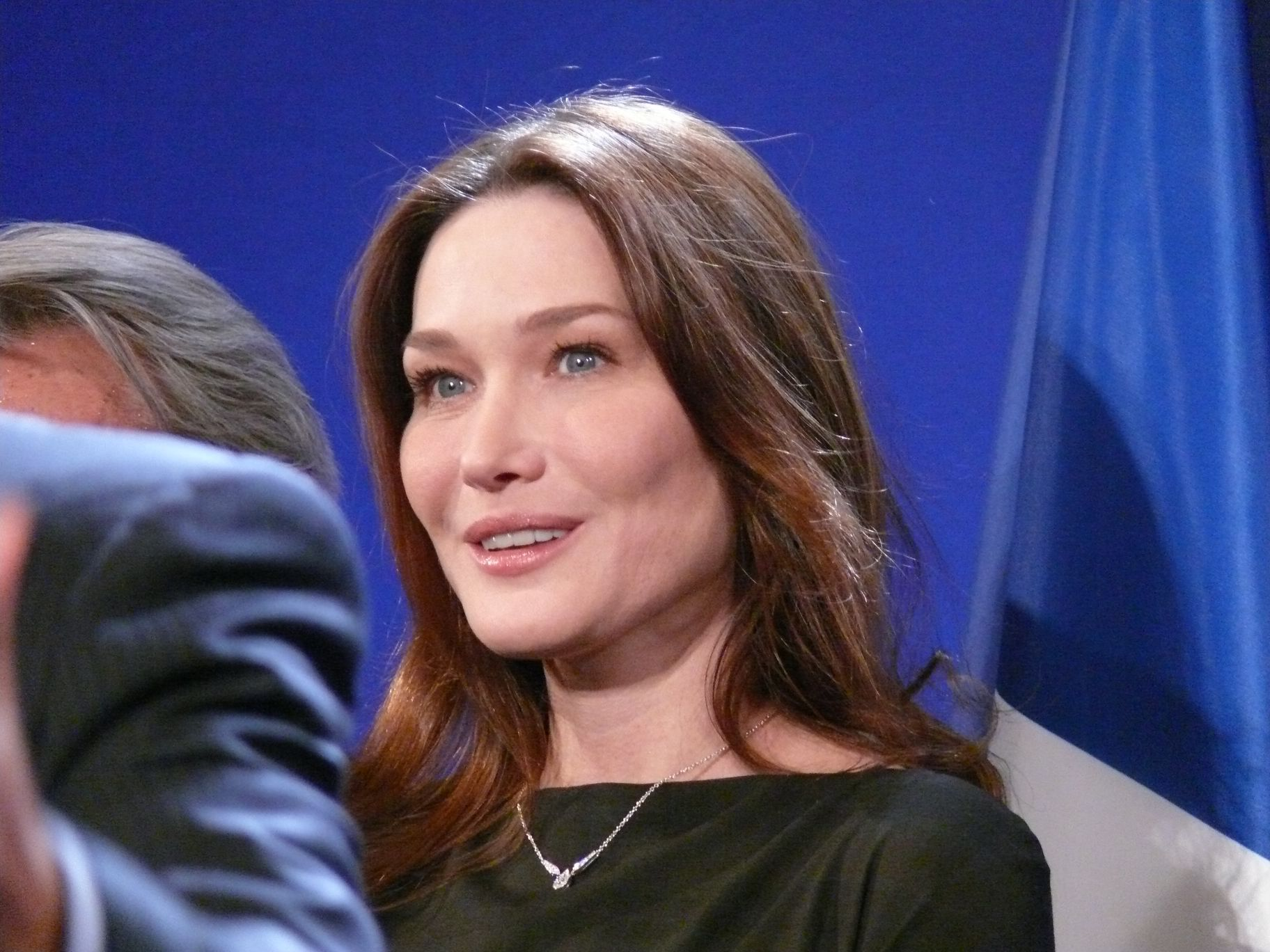
- Bruni in 2010
- Studio albums: 6
- Singles: 12
- Music videos: 7
- Promotional singles: 6

Italian-French singer Carla Bruni has released six studio albums, five singles, six promotional singles and five music videos. In 2003, her debut album Quelqu'un m'a dit, produced by Louis Bertignac, was released in Europe with success in Francophone countries. Three songs from the album appear in Hans Canosa's 2005 American film Conversations with Other Women, the song Le Plus Beau du quartier was used in H&M's Christmas 2006 commercial, and the title track was featured in the 2003 movie Le Divorce and in the 2009 movie (500) Days of Summer. In January 2010, her song "L'amoureuse" was featured in an episode of NBC's Chuck, "Chuck vs. First Class".

Her second album, No Promises containing poems by William Butler Yeats, Emily Dickinson, W. H. Auden, Dorothy Parker, Walter de la Mare and Christina Rossetti, set to music, was released in January 2007. She released her third album Comme si de rien n'était on 11 July 2008. The songs were self-penned except for one rendition of "You Belong to Me" and another song featuring Michel Houellebecq's poem La Possibilité d'une île set to music. Royalties from the album were planned to be donated to unidentified charitable and humanitarian causes.

== Albums ==
=== Studio albums ===
List of studio albums, with selected chart positions, sales figures and certifications
Title	Album details	Peak chart positions										Certifications
Title	Album details	FRA	AUT	BEL (Fl)	BEL (Wa)	GER	ITA	NL	POR	SWI	UK	Certifications
Quelqu'un m'a dit	Released: 8 April 2003; Formats: CD, digital download; Label: Naïve Records	1	27	9	1	15	4	—	5	4	178	BEA: Platinum; BVMI: Gold; IFPI SWI: Platinum
No Promises	Released: 15 January 2007; Formats: CD, digital download; Label: Naïve Records; Ministry of Sound Records	1	11	2	1	2	11	47	6	1	65	BEA: Gold
Comme si de rien n'était	Released: 11 July 2008; Formats: CD, digital download; Label: Naïve Records	1	10	6	2	24	14	31	21	3	58	BEA: Gold
Little French Songs	Released: 29 March 2013; Formats: CD, digital download; Label: Teorema Records / Universal Music	2	26	8	8	28	92	—	—	30	—	SNEP: Platinum
French Touch	Released: 6 October 2017; Formats: CD, digital download; Label: Teorema Records / Universal Music	8	45	16	16	27	—	—	42	19	—	SNEP: Gold
Carla Bruni	Released: 9 October 2020; Formats: CD, digital download; Label: Teorema Records / Universal Music	12	58	73	15	41	—	—	—	26	—	
"—" denotes releases that did not chart or were not released in that territory.

=== Live albums ===
List of live albums, with selected chart positions
Title	Album details	Peak chart positions	
Title	Album details	FRA	BEL (Wa)
À l'Olympia Bruno Coquatrix	Released: 17 October 2014; Formats: CD, digital download; Label: Teorema / Barclay Records (UMG)	75	87

== Singles ==
=== As main artist ===
List of singles, with selected chart positions
Title	Year	Peak chart positions						Album
Title	Year	FRA	AUT	BEL (Fl)	BEL (Wa)	NL	POR	Album
"Quelqu'un m'a dit"	2002	111	—	—	—	—	—	Quelqu'un m'a dit
"Tout le monde"	2002	—	—	—	—	—	—	Quelqu'un m'a dit
"Qu'est-ce que tu crois?" (with Julien Clerc)	2003	—	—	—	11	—	—	Studio
"Those Dancing Days Are Gone"	2006	—	—	14	6	—	40	No Promises
"If You Were Coming in the Fall"	2006	—	—	—	—	—	—	No Promises
"L'Amoureuse"	2008	—	62	14	2	85	—	Comme si de rien n'était
"Absolute Beginners"	2010	—	—	—	—	—	—	We Were So Turned On: A Tribute to David Bowie
"Chez Keith et Anita"	2013	62	—	68	19	—	—	Little French Songs
"Mon Raymond"	2013	57	—	—	40	—	—	Little French Songs
"Le pingouin"	2013	42	—	—	—	—	—	Little French Songs
"Enjoy the Silence"	2017	— (Note: "Enjoy the Silence" did not enter the main French singles chart, but peaked at number 94 on the Téléchargés (Downloads) chart.)	—	—	—	—	—	French Touch
"Miss You"	2017	— (Note: "Miss You" did not enter the main French singles chart, but peaked at number 41 on the Téléchargés (Downloads) chart.)	—	82	—	—	—	French Touch
"—" denotes releases that did not chart or were not released in that territory.

=== Promotional singles ===
Title	Year	Album
"Raphael"	2002	Quelqu'un m'a dit
"Le toi du moi"	2003	Quelqu'un m'a dit
"Before the World Was Made"	2005	No Promises
"T'a Tienne"	2008	Comme si de rien n'était
"L'Antilope"	2008	Comme si de rien n'était

=== As featured artist ===
Title	Year	Notes
"Vole"	2016	Charity single (with Nolwenn Leroy, Alain Souchon, Laurent Voulzy...)
"Insensatez (Quelle Grande Sottise)" (Mart'nália featuring Carla Bruni)	2019	Released on the album Mart'nália Canta Vinicius de Moraes
"Photographs" (Tanya Chua featuring Carla Bruni)	2021	

== Other charted songs ==
List of charted songs, with selected chart positions
Title	Year	Peak chart positions	Album
Title	Year	FRA	Album
"Dolce Francia"	2013	188	Little French Songs
"The Winner Takes It All"	2017	— (Note: "The Winner Takes It All" did not enter the main French singles chart, but peaked at number 65 on the Téléchargés (Downloads) chart.)	French Touch
"Stand by Your Man"	2017	— (Note: "Stand by Your Man" did not enter the main French singles chart, but peaked at number 94 on the Téléchargés (Downloads) chart.)	French Touch
"Moon River"	2017	— (Note: "Moon River" did not enter the main French singles chart, but peaked at number 173 on the Téléchargés (Downloads) chart.)	French Touch
"—" denotes releases that did not chart or were not released in that territory.

== Music videos ==
Title	Year	Director
"Quelqu'un m'a dit"	2002	Carla Bruni
"Tout le monde"	2002	Carla Bruni
"Those Dancing Days Are Gone"	2006	
"If You Were Coming in the Fall"	2006	
"L'Amoureuse"	2008	Lui Danose
"Chez Keith et Anita"	2013	
"Mon Raymond"	2013	
