= Charles Pasi =

French singer-songwriter and harmonica player

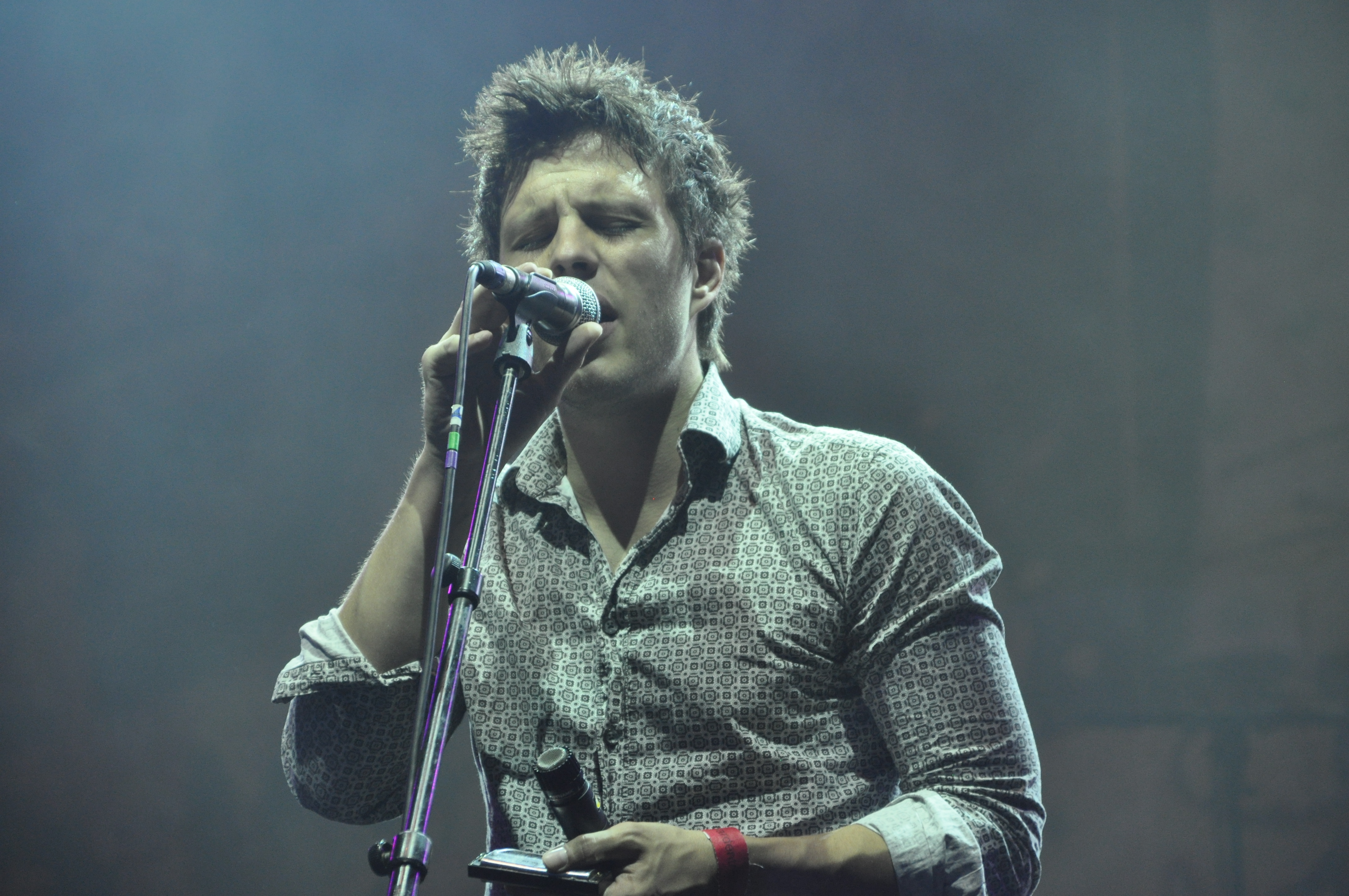
- Charles Pasi at the Bardentreffen music festival in 2013 in Nuremberg

Background information
- Labels: Believe Recordings, Blue Note Records

Charles Pasi (born 8 February 1984 in Paris) is a French singer-songwriter and harmonica player.

== Biography ==
=== Early life and education ===
Born to an Italian father and a French mother, Charles Pasi grew up in Paris and was influenced early on by Ray Charles, Little Richard, and Percy Sledge. Without a particular desire to become a musician, he joined a gospel choir at 17 and discovered the harmonica by listening to Bob Dylan and Neil Young.

The harmonica is an anti-hero, with a bit of an outsider side to music. It’s not something you learn at the conservatory! And it has this playful aspect, like a toy. It suited me perfectly, kind of like my alter ego, since I wasn’t a star student!

After his baccalauréat, he studied at the Saint Louis Jazz School in Rome and then returned to Paris to take courses at the CIM jazz school and the Atla School.

=== Early career (2005–2008) ===
In Rome, he played with the band Mood in Black and then earned his first fees in Parisian bistros.

In 2005, Charles Pasi won the electro-acoustic prize at the Blues sur Seine national competition and the prize at the FestiBlues International Montreal.

In 2006, he released a blues EP, Mainly Blue, in English, which he self-produced.

English allows me to be sincere, to reach the depth of my thoughts. In French, I tend to search for words, refinement, and that doesn’t necessarily create the most beautiful images. For now, I don’t feel capable of writing in French; I have the temptation to sweeten my feelings

He participated in various festivals, including the Memphis International Blues Challenge, where he was a finalist, and then began an international tour (United States, Canada, Russia, Hungary, Benelux, Italy, Spain...) He contributed to the soundtracks of the films Actresses by Valeria Bruni-Tedeschi and Cineman by Yann Moix. Carla Bruni engaged him for her albums No Promises and Comme si de rien n'était and as a guitarist on her tour.

=== Albums Uncaged and Sometimes Awake (2009–2016) ===
In 2009, he released his second EP Uncaged. Charles Pasi won the Zimbalam competition at Printemps de Bourges, allowing for the digital distribution of the EP through Believe Recordings. In 2011, the album Uncaged was released. American saxophonist Archie Shepp played on two tracks. For Libération:

The Franco-Italian singer-songwriter has moved beyond the blues of his first album, Mainly Blue, to expand into more soul and funky textures, without forgetting pop caresses and rock momentum

The music video for the single Better With Butter was directed by actor Louis Garrel. The singer appeared on the musical show Taratata on France 2 and opened for Carla Bruni, Zaz, Jean-Louis Aubert, Sanseverino.

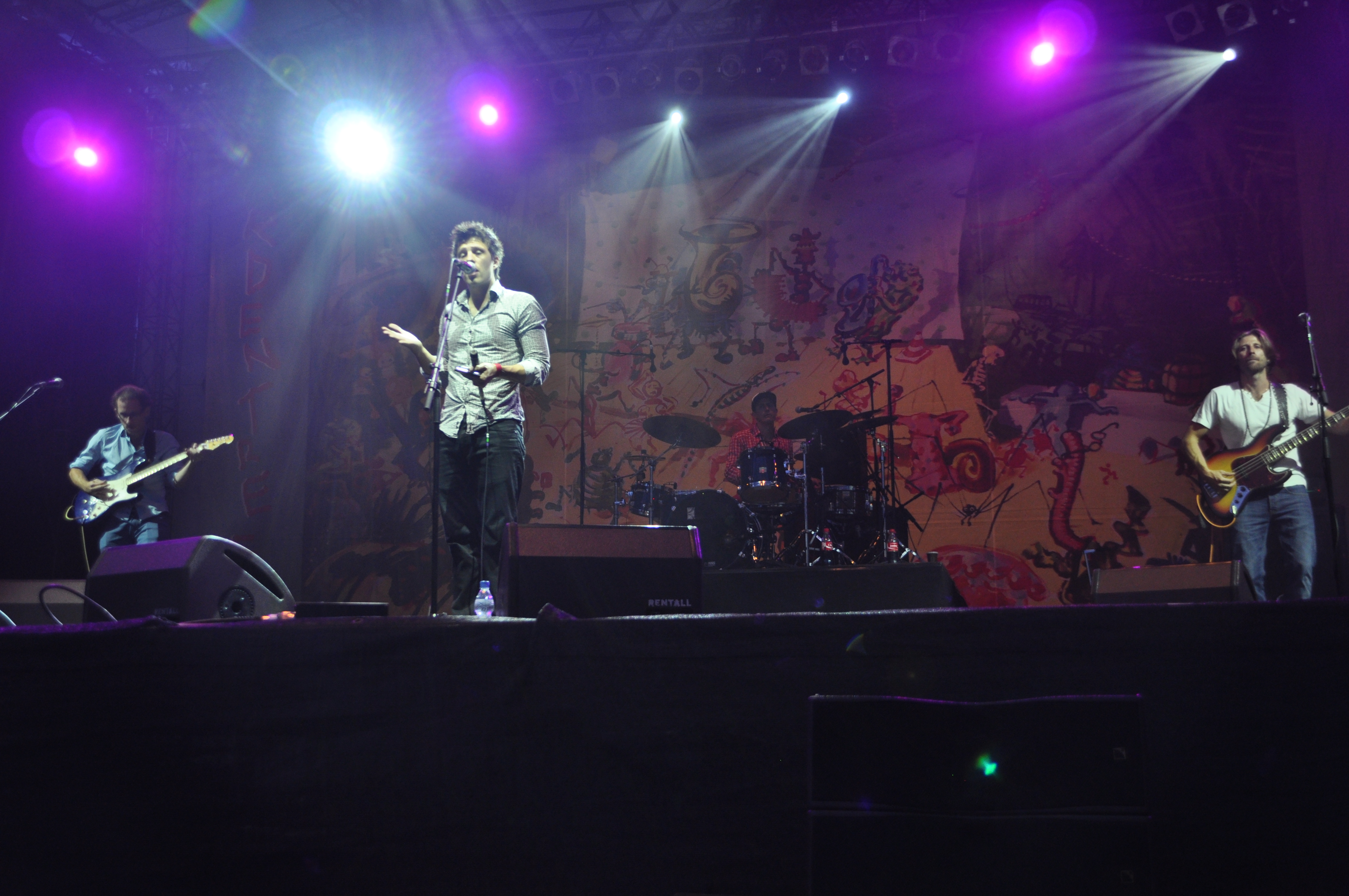
Charles Pasi at the Bardentreffen music festival in 2013 in Nuremberg.

In 2014, his second album Sometimes Awake was released. For L'Humanité:

a music open to jazz, blues, soul, folk, and Afro-American influences

For RTL:

a little gem, unformatted, not coming directly from the factories. The tracks are airy, and you encounter all styles (even some pop-rock sounds). His slightly raspy voice moves wonderfully with the notes

He was nominated for the 2014 Victoires du Jazz award in the Revelation of the Year category.

=== Albums Ceci est la musique and Elle (2017–2022) ===
In 2017, Pasi released the album Ceci est la musique, with an eclectic style ranging from blues to chanson and soul. He released a new album Elle in 2020, which was described as an album that mixes blues, jazz, and soul.

== Discography ==
- Mainly Blue (EP, 2006)
- Uncaged (2011)
- Sometimes Awake (2014)
- Ceci est la musique (2017)
- Elle (2020)
- Adamas (2025)
