= Quelqu'un m'a dit =

Studio album by Carla Bruni
- Released: 8 April 2003
- Recorded: 2002
- Genres: Folk, chanson
- Length: 38:27
- Language: French
- Label: Naïve
- Producers: Carla Bruni, Louis Bertignac

Carla Bruni chronology
Quelqu'un m'a dit (2003)	No Promises (2007)

Singles from Quelqu'un m'a dit
- 1. "Quelqu'un m'a dit" Released: 2002; 2. "Tout le monde" Released: 2002

Quelqu'un m'a dit (French pronunciation: [kɛlkœ̃ madi]; Someone told me) is the debut studio album of Italian-French singer Carla Bruni. It was produced, recorded and mixed by Louis Bertignac and released in 2003.

== Reception ==
Professional ratings
Review scores
Source	Rating
AllMusic	3.5/5 stars
The Observer	4/5 stars

Quelqu'un m'a dit debuted at number one on the French Album Chart, spending thirty-four non-consecutive weeks in the top ten. The album also reached the top ten in Germany, Switzerland, Italy, Portugal and Chile.

Three tracks appeared in Hans Canosa's 2005 American film Conversations with Other Women ("J'en connais", "Le plus beau du quartier", and "L'excessive"), and the song "Le plus beau du quartier" was used in H&M's Christmas 2006 commercial. The title track was played over the closing credits of Mensonges et trahisons et plus si affinités..., included on the (500) Days of Summer soundtrack released in 2009, and appeared in the 2010 Carte d'Or Muffin commercial. The song "Le Ciel Dans Une Chambre" also appeared in an episode of Skins, series 3.

== Details ==
The second track, "Raphaël", is named for Bruni's then-lover, philosophy professor Raphaël Enthoven, with whom she had a son, Aurélien Enthoven, in 2001.

Bruni has further collaborated with the producer Louis Bertignac in 2005 duetting with him on the song "Les Frôleuses" on his new album.

== Track listing ==
All lyrics are written by Carla Bruni except where otherwise indicated; all music is composed by Carla Bruni except where otherwise indicated

No.	Title	Lyrics	Music	Length
1.	"Quelqu'un m'a dit (Someone Told Me)"	Carla Bruni, Leos Carax		2:45
2.	"Raphaël"			2:23
3.	"Tout le monde (Everyone)"			3:17
4.	"La Noyée (The Drowned Girl)"	Serge Gainsbourg	Serge Gainsbourg	3:58
5.	"Le Toi du moi (You of Me)"			3:18
6.	"Le Ciel dans une chambre (Heaven in a Room)" (French adaptation by Carla Bruni of Il cielo in una stanza)	Gino Paoli, Giulio Rapetti, Carla Bruni	Gino Paoli, Renato Angiolini	4:48
7.	"J'en connais (I Know Some)"			2:34
8.	"Le Plus Beau du quartier (The Most Handsome Boy Of The Neighbourhood)"			3:27
9.	"Chanson triste (Sad Song)"			3:28
10.	"L'Excessive (The Excessive)"			3:03
11.	"L'Amour (Love)"			3:03
12.	"La Dernière Minute (The Last Minute)"			1:00

== Song summaries ==
1. Quelqu'un m'a dit (Someone Told Me)
This melancholy song from which the album draws its name speaks of the sadness of life – "On me dit que nos vies ne valent pas grand chose, / Elles passent en un instant comme fanent les roses." ("They tell me that our lives are not worth very much, / They pass in an instant as roses wilt.") – and that time and fate (destiny) care nothing for us. She forlornly hopes that "you still love me" – "quelqu'un m'a dit / Que tu m'aimais encore," ("Somebody told me / that you loved me still") – recalling that somebody told her, but she cannot remember who.
2. Raphaël
In this lively and playful song, Bruni sings of her love for her then-lover Raphaël Enthoven, first reveling in his name – "Quatre consonnes et trois voyelles / c'est le prénom de Raphaël," ("Four consonants and three vowels / that's the first name of Raphaël") – then delighting in his wickedness and their time together. The middle of the song features mysterious lyrics – "Peau de chagrin, pâtre éternel / Archange étrange d'un autre ciel" ("Shagreen/Sorrow skin, eternal father / Strange archangel from another heaven/sky"), alluding to the magical skin that is slowly used up in Balzac's novel La Peau de chagrin. She later sings of their love being in the moment – "Pas de promesse à l'éternel" ("No promises of eternity") – compare the title of her next album, No Promises, and the eventual end of her relationship with Raphaël.
3. Tout le monde (Everyone)
This melancholy song tells of how everyone has known disappointment – forgotten childhood memories, remains of dreams ("restes de rêves"), and devastation – and then absurdly suggests that this solitude should be fixed by passing a law – "Il faudrait que tout l'monde réclame auprès des autorités, / Une loi contre toute notre solitude," ("Everyone should demand from the authorities / A law against all our solitude."), musing on French socialism.
4. La noyée (Drowned)
This is a cover of a song by Serge Gainsbourg, which Bruni heard on the soundtrack to the movie Romance of a Horsethief (1971); another cover was released near the same time in the 2002 album C'était ici.
The song speaks of time and memory separating people, using contrasting images of water – "la rivière du souvenir" ("the river of memory") and "l'océan de l'oubli" ("the ocean of forgetting").
5. Le toi du moi (You of Me)
This love song consists of various pairings of the form "You are my X, I am your Y", "I am the X, you are the Y", or "You are the X of my Y", beginning "Je suis ton pile / Tu es mon face" ("I am your tails / You are my heads" [We are two sides of the same coin]), passing through over fifty pairs, climaxing 2/3 of the way through and again ending with "T'es le jamais de mon toujours / T'es mon amour t'es mon amour." ("You are the never of my forever / You are my love you are my love.")
Some of the images are playful "T'es la moustache de mon Trotski" ("You are the mustache of my Trotsky"), while some allude to drugs "Toi tu es l'herbe et moi le joint" ("You are the weed and I'm the joint" – marijuana) and "Toi la paille et moi la poudre" ("You the straw and I the powder" – cocaine); compare Tu es ma came ("You're My Drug") from her third album, Comme si de rien n'était.
6. Le ciel dans une chambre (Heaven in a Room)
7. J'en connais (I Know Some)
8. Le plus beau du quartier (The Most Handsome Boy Of The Neighbourhood)
9. Chanson triste (Sad Song)
10. L'excessive (The Excessive)
11. L'amour (Love)
12. La dernière minute (The Last Minute)
The last song is one minute long, exactly as it says on the tin. It features a metronome tick-tock beat. The lyrics refer to someone at the end of her life, not yet ready to die ("Quand je verrai ma mort juste au pied de mon lit (When I see my death at the foot of my bed)/ Que je la verrai sourire de ma si petite vie (I'll see a smile from my little life)/ Je lui dirai "écoute ! laisse-moi juste une minute" (I will say [to death], "Listen! Give me just a minute!").

== Charts ==
Weekly chart performance for Quelqu'un m'a dit
Chart (2003–2005)	Peak position
Australian Albums (ARIA Charts)	91
Austrian Albums (Ö3 Austria)	27
Belgian Albums (Ultratop Flanders)	9
Belgian Albums (Ultratop Wallonia)	1
Canadian Albums (Nielsen SoundScan)	28
European Albums (Music & Media)	14
French Albums (SNEP)	1
German Albums (Offizielle Top 100)	14
Italian Albums (FIMI)	4
Portuguese Albums (AFP)	5
Swiss Albums (Schweizer Hitparade)	4
UK Albums (Official Charts)	178
UK Independent Albums (Official Charts)	45
US World Albums (Billboard)	3

2002 year-end chart performance for Quelqu'un m'a dit
Chart (2002)	Position
French Albums (SNEP)	27

2003 year-end chart performance for Quelqu'un m'a dit
Chart (2003)	Position
Belgian Albums (Ultratop Flanders)	53
Belgian Albums (Ultratop Wallonia)	1
French Albums (SNEP)	3
German Albums (Offizielle Top 100)	71
Italian Albums (FIMI)	45
Swiss Albums (Schweizer Hitparade)	41

2004 year-end chart performance for Quelqu'un m'a dit
Chart (2004)	Position
Belgian Albums (Ultratop Wallonia)	49
French Albums (SNEP)	61

== Certifications and sales ==
Certifications and sales for Quelqu'un m'a dit
Region	Certification	Certified units/sales
Belgium (BRMA)	Platinum	50,000^{*}
Canada (Music Canada)	Platinum	100,000^{^}
France	—	1,500,000
Germany (BVMI)	Gold	100,000^{^}
Spain (Promusicae)	Gold	50,000^{^}
Switzerland (IFPI Switzerland)	Platinum	40,000^{^}
United Kingdom	—	16,000
United States	—	53,000
Summaries
Worldwide	—	2,000,000
^{*} Sales figures based on certification alone.^{^} Shipments figures based on certification alone.
