= Nothing Serious =

Nothing Serious may refer to:

- Nothing Serious (short stories), a 1950 collection of short stories by P. G. Wodehouse
- Nothing Serious (novel), a 2005 novel by Justine Lévy
- Nothing Serious (film), 2021 South Korean romantic film
