= Emanuele Coccia =

Italian philosopher

- Born: 1976 (age 49–50); Italy
- Occupation: Philosopher
- Awards: Prix PhiloMonaco de l'Essai 2017 for La Vie des plantes (The Life of Plants)

Education
- Education: Free University of Berlin, University of Macerata
- Alma mater: University of Florence
- Thesis: De bono universis: An Anonymous Treatise Attributed to Witelo—Critical Edition and Commentary (2005)
- Doctoral advisors: Stefano Zamponi, Gian Carlo Garfagnini

Philosophical work
- Era: Contemporary philosophy
- Region: Western philosophy
- Institutions: EHESS
- Language: Italian, French, English
- Main interests: Philosophy, history of philosophy, history of art, metaphysics, plants, images, ontology, aesthetics
- Notable works: The Life of Plants: A Metaphysics of Mixture (2018), Sensible Life: A Micro-ontology of the Image (2016)

Emanuele Coccia, born in 1976, is an Italian philosopher and since 2011 an associate professor at the School for Advanced Studies in the Social Sciences (EHESS) in Paris. He began his academic career in medieval studies, but evolved into metaphysics, aesthetics, and ontology, making his mark in the field as someone who addresses areas typically neglected in philosophy, like fashion and botany.

His book La Vie des plantes: Une métaphysique du mélange, later translated to English as The Life of Plants: A Metaphysics of Mixture, received the Prix PhiloMonaco de l’Essai in 2017.

== Biography ==
Coccia was born in Italy with a twin brother named Matteo who died in 2001. He has discussed this piece of trivia from his background as key in his formation of becoming a philosopher: 1, in the postface of The Life of Plants, and 2, in the series Où va la philosophie française ?, at a conference organized by Les Rencontres Philosophiques at the Oceanographic Museum of Monaco. Coccia described his first encounter with philosophical questions as arising from a black-and-white photograph of himself and his twin brother as infants. Because he could not determine which child in the photograph was him, the image prompted questions about identity, resemblance, perception, and the relationship between the self and the other. He recalled that the uncertainty initially amused him but also produced a sense of wonder. The photograph later acquired a more profound and unsettling significance, particularly because he remained unable, even as an adult, to distinguish himself from his brother in the image.

== Education ==
He holds a bachelor's degree (philosophy, with a study abroad period at the Free University of Berlin) and a master's degree in history of philosophy from the University of Macerata. In 2001, he defended a master's thesis titled Nature and Origin of the Intellect in Averroism under the supervision of Filippo Mignini. His MA-BA dissertation was a "long dissertation equivalent to a PhD," according to the CV attached to his EHESS faculty profile.

He received a doctorate in medieval philosophy and philology from the University of Florence in 2005, with a dissertation titled De bono universis: An Anonymous Treatise Attributed to Witelo—Critical Edition and Commentary.

=== Post-doctoral fellowships ===
- 2005-2006: Autonomous University of Barcelona.
- 2006-2007: Max Planck Institute for Legal History and Legal Theory in Frankfurt am Main
- 2008-2009: University of Aix-Marseille (for a Programm on Emotions in Middle Ages)

== Academic career ==
He taught at the University of Freiburg in Freiburg im Breisgau, Germany from 2008 to 2011, as an Assistant Professor for Ancient and Medieval History of Philosophy.

Since 2011, he has been an associate professor at l'École des Hautes Études en Sciences Sociales (EHESS).

From 2013-2016, he taught history of art for the Vocational Bachelor's Program in fashion design at the École Duperré art school in Paris.

=== Visiting professorships, fellowships ===
- Invited Professor, March 2009: University of Tokyo
- Invited Professor, September 2010: University of Buenos Aires
- Invited Professor, Department of Media Studies, 2013, 2015/2016: Heinrich Heine University Düsseldorf
- Research Associate, September 2015-May 2016: Italian Academy for Advanced Studies, Columbia University
- Senior Fellow, May-August 2019: International Research Institute for Cultural Technologies and Media Philosophy

== Research and activities ==
Early in his career, his research focused on medieval philosophy, especially the doctrine of Averroism. He worked with fellow Italian philosopher Giorgio Agamben to edit the anthology Angeli, Ebraismo, Cristianesimo, Islam, published in 2012.

His research evolved toward metaphysics and the theory of the image and the nature of living things. He wrote La Vie sensible, a work heralded by Roger Pol-Droit of Le Monde newspaper as a "philosophical meteorite." In this book, Coccia defines the ontological status of the image as something apart from or between subject and object, not merely as illusion but as something sensed and actually lived through. The second part of the book looks at how we interact with images through dreams, fashion, and biology. Published by Fordham University Press, the English translation by Scott Alan Stuart is rendered as A Sensible Life: A Micro-ontology of the Image, part of the press's series on Commonalities.

In 2016, he contributed to the collective work Adam, la nature humaine, avant et après. Épistémologie de la Chute under the direction of Irène Rosier-Catach and Gianluca Briguglia. The following year, La Vie des plantes was awarded the Prix PhiloMonaco d'Essai. La vie des plantes reinforces plants as active beings, and, moreover, as the creators of the atmosphere. It takes the view that plants actively shape and connect all living beings on the planet. One reviewer praised the work overall, but argued that Coccia puts too much weight on his argument about seeds. Reason, Coccia argues, is a seed even before the seed as existing matter. And from reason to seed, through the soil and the roots, the plant thus connects with everything. But, Josh Dugat argues that Coccia's thesis neglects the simple fact that every plant does not originate from seeds. Coccia does, however, point out in the book that "reason is a seed or a spore." In any case, by framing plants as born of reason, Coccia does something entirely new in philosophy. Philosophie magazine called it much more "metaphysical meditation" than botany as a science, not even naming specific plants but speaking of all plant life in more general terms.

In 2018, he contributed to Dior Images, a visual tribute to Paolo Roversi published by Rizzoli. In this vein, he also collaborated with photographer Viviane Sasson on Modern Alchemy: Artisans of the Wild: an Enchanting History, 2, a meditation on art and nature and the unity of all sentient life forms. (Note: A dialogue between Coccia and Sasson published by JBE Books, 2022.) Coccia's author bio for the book describes him as a philosopher of aesthetics, reemphasizing his focus on the ontological status of the image. Coccia's research about images and aesthetics naturally parlayed into the fashion scene. He met Alessandro Michele while the latter was still at Gucci, through mutual acquaintance Giovanni Attili, a professor of urban planning at the Università La Sapienza in Rome, who is Michele's committed partner. Coccia explained in an interview that he and Michele instantly understood each other and from that connection they conceived the book that became in English The Life of Forms: Philosophy of Re-Enchantment (HarperCollins, 2025.) He was quoted in the Vogue interview: "I believe that fashion is the art that allows life to take its form, and therefore is the privileged subject of philosophy." The book was co-written by Michele and Coccia in lockdown during the COVID-19 pandemic, was first published in Italian in 2021, and within a fear years, as the English translation was being talked about, the fashion world anticipated Michele's transition as the new creative director at Maison Valentino. Michele explained that "ultimately [the book is] about so many other things," divided into seven stanzas (philosophy, ambiguity, animism, design, collections, Hollywood, twins) and "structured as a philosophical conversation," with sections recalling religious texts. For Coccia, it centers on the idea that fashion gives form to the identity that one wears in the world. As we lose mystery and wonder in life that becomes ordinary, there is a role for fashion as an art form that can reinvigorate our perceptions.

In 2019, Coccia acted as scientific advisor on the exhibition Nous les Aries (Our Trees) in the garden of the Cartier Foundation in Paris.

In 2020-2021, Coccia was then a guest artist for a year at Le Fresnoy, the Studio national des arts contemporains, (national studio of contemporary art.) In addition, from 2021 to 2022, he wrote a monthly column entitled "Points de vie" in the French daily newspaper Libération. Around this time, through his book, Philosophie de la maison, he began to focus on ideas about space, in particular the Aristotelian idea of space as a third element between object and subject. (Note: He points out in the School of Architecture lecture that Aristotle wrote about this in De Anima (On the Soul). See YouTube video in reference: About ten minutes into the video.)

He contributed to the series Où va la philosophie française ? published in Les Cahiers from Les Rencontres Philosophiques de Monaco. The volume, a collective work, was published by Librairie philosophique J. Vrin in 2024.

He co-edited the collective Le cri de Gaïa with Frédérique Aït-Touati, a historian of science. Contributors to the work include philosopher Vinciane Despret.

== Publications ==
- La trasparenza delle immagini. Averroè e l’averroismo, Milan, Mondadori, 240 p., 2005. Translated in Spanish. ISBN 9788842492726.
- La Vie sensible, translated from Italian by Martin Rueff, published in Paris, by Payot et Rivages, 2010
  - Translated in six languages, including the English Sensible Life: A Micro-ontology of the Image. Fordham University Press, 2016. Translation by Scott Alan Stuart. Introduction by Kevin Attell. ISBN 9780823267422.
- Angeli. Ebraismo, Cristianesimo, Islam, éd. E. Coccia et Giorgio Agamben, Milan/Vicence, Neripozza, 2012.
- Le Bien dans les choses, translated by M. Rueff from Italian to French. Paris: Payot et Rivages, 2013. (Translated in five languages)
- La Vie des plantes. Une métaphysique du mélange, Paris, Payot et Rivages, 2016.
  - Translated in ten languages, including the English The Life of Plants: A Metaphysics of Mixture. Polity Press, 2018.
- Avec Donatien Grau, Le Musée transitoire. At 10 Corso Como, Paris, Klincksieck, 2018, 104 p.[8]. (Translated in English.)
- Métamorphoses, Paris, Bibliothèque Rivages, 240 p., 2020.
  - Translated in English by Robin Mackay as Metamorphoses. Polity Press, 2021. ISBN 9781509545674.
- Philosophie de la maison. L'espace domestique et le bonheur, translated by Léo Texier, Paris, Bibliothèque Rivages, 150 p., 2022.
  - Translated in English as Philosophy of the Home: Domestic Space and Happiness. Penguin Books, 2024. ISBN 9781802061024
- Hiérarchie. La société des anges, translated by Joël Gayraud, Paris, Rivages, 2023, 250 p.
- Co-authored La vita della forme: Filosofia del reincanto with Alessandro Michele. HarperCollins Italia, 224p., 2024. ISBN 9791259851420.
  - Translated by as The Life of Forms: Theory of the Re-enchantment. HarperCollins, 2025.
- Traité de l'amour moderne, Paris, Climats/Éditions Flammarion, 288 p., 2026.

== Appendices ==
=== Bibliography ===
- Françoise Le Corre : « Emanuele Coccia - La Vie sensible - Translated from l’Italien by Martin Rueff » , Études, avril 2011
- Marielle Macé : « Rayonnement du sensible » , Critique , vol. 767, no. 4, 2011, p. 339–349
- Françoise le Corre : « Review: Le bien dans les choses
- Emanuele Coccia - Le Bien dans les choses - Translated from Italien by Martin Rueff, Études, March 2014
- Jean-Marc Drouin : « Végéter - À propos de : Emanuele Coccia, La Vie des plantes Une métaphysique du mélange », La Vie des idées, 2017
- Frank Burbage : « Emanuele Coccia. La vie des Plantes – Une métaphysique du mélange. Paris, Rivages », Cahiers philosophiques, 2018/1.
- Umut Ungan : « Emanuele Coccia, Donatien Grau, Le Musée transitoire. Sur 10 Corso Como, Paris, Klincksieck » , Marges , 27, 2018.

==== Radio ====
- La Vie des plantes on France Culture, Les Chemins de la philosophie , 17 March 2017
- « Exposer les arbres », La grande table d'été on France Culture, second part, 12 July 2019

=== External links ===
- Le CRAL EHESS profile Emanuele Coccia
- PhiloMonaco profile Emanuele Coccia
