= Catherine David (writer) =

French writer (1949–2023)

- Born: Catherine Gradwohl; 2 December 1949; Boulogne-Billancourt, France
- Died: 2 January 2023 (aged 73); 14th arrondissement of Paris, France
- Resting place: Montmartre Cemetery
- Education: Sciences Po; Swarthmore College; Paris 1 Panthéon-Sorbonne University
- Occupation: Writer
- Partner: Jean-Paul Enthoven
- Children: 3 (including Raphaël Enthoven)

Catherine Gradwohl (2 December 1949 – 2 January 2023), better known as Catherine David, was a Franco-American novelist, essayist and literary critic.

== Life and career ==
Catherine David is of Jewish Alsatian descent on her father's side and American Catholic on her mother's side.

After her secondary studies, David spent one year at the Swarthmore College in Pennsylvania. Graduated from Sciences Po, she also holds a degree in history from the Pantheon-Sorbonne University.

With philosopher Jean-Paul Enthoven, she had a son, Raphaël, agrégé in philosophy and audiovisual chronicler.

After she worked with several publishing houses (Gallimard, Jean-Jacques Pauvert), she turned to literary criticism and journalism at the Nouvel Observateur in the cultural field – literature, history, philosophy, psychoanalysis, human sciences, history of sciences, prehistory, astrophysics.

In 1984, she won the Prix Contrepoint for her first novel, L'Océan miniature.

David died in Paris on 2 January 2023, at the age of 73.

== Works ==
- 1983: L'Océan miniature, novel, Éditions du Seuil, Prix Contrepoint
- 1990: Simone Signoret ou la mémoire partagée, biographical essay, Éditions Robert Laffont
- 1994: La Beauté du geste, essay on piano and Tai chi, Calmann-Lévy
- 1995: Passage de l'Ange, novel, Calmann-Lévy
- 2001: L'Homme qui savait tout, le roman de Pic de la Mirandole, novel, Éditions du Seuil
- 2003: Clandestine, narration, Éditions du Seuil
- 2006: Crescendo, avis aux amateurs, series "un endroit où aller", Actes Sud
- 2010: Les Violons sur le moi : pourquoi la célébrité nous fascine, cartoons by Jean-Jacques Sempé, essay, Éditions Denoël

=== In collaboration ===
- 1996: L'Occident en quête de sens, anthology, preface by Jean Daniel, Maisonneuve et Larose
- 1998: Little Bang : Le roman des commencements, with Jean-Philippe de Tonnac, novel, Nil Éditions
- 1998: Égyptes, anthologie de l'ancien Empire à nos jours, anthology, Maisonneuve et Larose
- 1998: Entretiens sur la fin des temps, conversations with Stephen Jay Gould, Jean Delumeau, Jean-Claude Carrière and Umberto Eco, Fayard
- 2000: Sommes-nous seuls dans l'Univers ?, conversations with Jean Heidmann, Alfred Vidal-Madjar, Nicolas Prantzos and Hubert Reeves, Fayard
- 2003: Sous le regard des dieux, conversation with Christiane Desroches Noblecourt, Albin Michel
