= Nothing Serious (novel) =

2004 novel by Justine Lévy

- Author: Justine Lévy
- Original title: Rien de grave
- Translator: Charlotte Mandell
- Language: French
- Genre: Fiction
- Publisher: Stock, Melville House Publishing
- Publication date: 2004
- Publication place: France
- English publication date: 2005
- Media type: Print
- Pages: 220
- ISBN: 2253111821
- OCLC: 745958219

Nothing Serious is a 2004 novel by French writer Justine Lévy. The novel presents an insight into the breakdown of marriage and its consequences. The story is a thinly disguised account of Carla Bruni's affair with Justine's then-husband Raphaël Enthoven, a philosophy professor, and son of publisher Jean-Paul Enthoven. The book was originally written in French, and was published in English in October 2005 by Melville House.
