= Chloé Lambert =

French actress (born 1976)

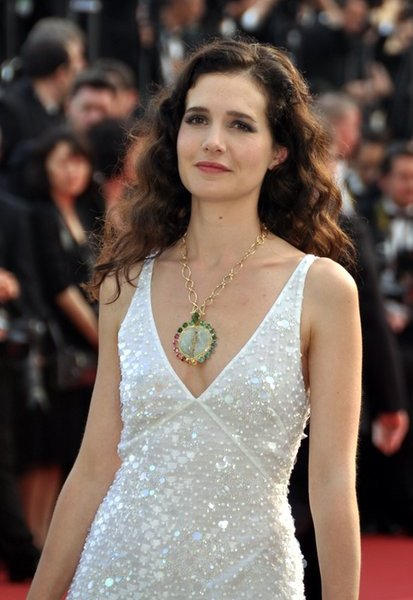
- Chloé Lambert at the Cannes Film Festival, 2011
- Born: 30 March 1976 (age 49); Marseille, France
- Occupation: Actress
- Notable credits: Chaos; Disco
- Partner(s): Raphaël Enthoven (2007–2012); Thibault Ameline
- Children: 2
- Awards: Prix Suzanne Bianchetti

Chloé Lambert (born 30 March 1976) is a French actress. She is known for her work in such films as Chaos (2001) and Disco (2008). She was awarded the Prix Suzanne Bianchetti as the most promising young film actress of 2005. She began her career onstage in Paris, and has appeared in film; however, much of her work has been in television.

== Personal life ==
From 2007 to 2012, Lambert had a relationship with Raphaël Enthoven, with whom she had a child, Sacha, born 19 December 2008. She also has a second child, Samuel, born in 2013, from her relationship with Thibault Ameline.

== Filmography ==
- 2001 : Confession d'un dragueur directed by Alain Soral
- 2001 : Chaos directed by Coline Serreau
- 2002 : Vingt-quatre heures de la vie d'une femme directed by Laurent Bouhnik
- 2004 : La Crim' (TV series) directed by Jean-Pierre Ramsay-Levi (1 episode)
- 2004 : Mariages ! directed by Valérie Guignabodet
- 2004 : Finding Neverland directed by Marc Forster (voice)
- 2005 : Hell directed by Bruno Chiche
- 2006 : Tombé du ciel directed by Pascale Breugnot
- 2008 : Disco directed by Fabien Onteniente
- 2010 : The Secrets of Rocheville Manor
- 2013 : R.I.S, police scientifique (television, one episode)
- 2015 : Joséphine, ange gardien (television, one episode)
- 2018 : Le Chalet (TV series) (television)
