= French Touch (album) =

Studio album by Carla Bruni
- Released: 6 October 2017
- Recorded: 2017
- Genre: Easy listening
- Language: English
- Label: Teorema; Barclay
- Producer: David Foster

Carla Bruni chronology
Little French Songs (2013)	French Touch (2017)

Singles from French Touch
- 1. "Enjoy the Silence" Released: 2017; 2. "Miss You" Released: 2017

French Touch is the fifth studio album by Italian-French singer Carla Bruni, released on 6 October 2017 by Teorema and Barclay.

Professional ratings
Review scores
Source	Rating
AllMusic	3.5/5 stars

== Track listing ==
1. "Enjoy the Silence" – 3:14
2. "Jimmy Jazz" – 2:30
3. "Love Letters" – 2:27
4. "Miss You" – 3:31
5. "The Winner Takes It All" – 3:31
6. "Crazy" (featuring Willie Nelson) – 3:03
7. "Highway to Hell" – 3:25
8. "Perfect Day" – 2:58
9. "Stand by Your Man" – 2:43
10. "Please Don't Kiss Me" – 3:34
11. "Moon River" – 3:14

DVD: Live Session at Studios St Germain, Paris

1. "Enjoy the Silence"
2. "Jimmy Jazz"
3. "Miss You"
4. "The Winner Takes It All"
5. "Crazy"
6. "Enjoy the Silence" (music video)
7. "Miss You" (music video)

== Charts ==
=== Weekly charts ===
Weekly chart performance for French Touch
Chart (2017)	Peak position
Austrian Albums (Ö3 Austria)	45
Belgian Albums (Ultratop Flanders)	16
Belgian Albums (Ultratop Wallonia)	16
Canadian Albums (Billboard)	33
French Albums (SNEP)	11
German Albums (Offizielle Top 100)	27
Greek Albums (IFPI)	9
Polish Albums (ZPAV)	27
Portuguese Albums (AFP)	42
Spanish Albums (PROMUSICAE)	38
Swiss Albums (Schweizer Hitparade)	19
US Heatseekers Albums (Billboard)	20

=== Year-end charts ===
Year-end chart performance for French Touch
Chart (2017)	Position
Belgian Albums (Ultratop Wallonia)	114
French Albums (SNEP)	122

== Certifications ==
Certifications for French Touch
Region	Certification	Certified units/sales
France (SNEP)	Gold	50,000^{‡}
^{‡} Sales+streaming figures based on certification alone.
