= Maud Fontenoy =

French rower and sailor (born 1977)

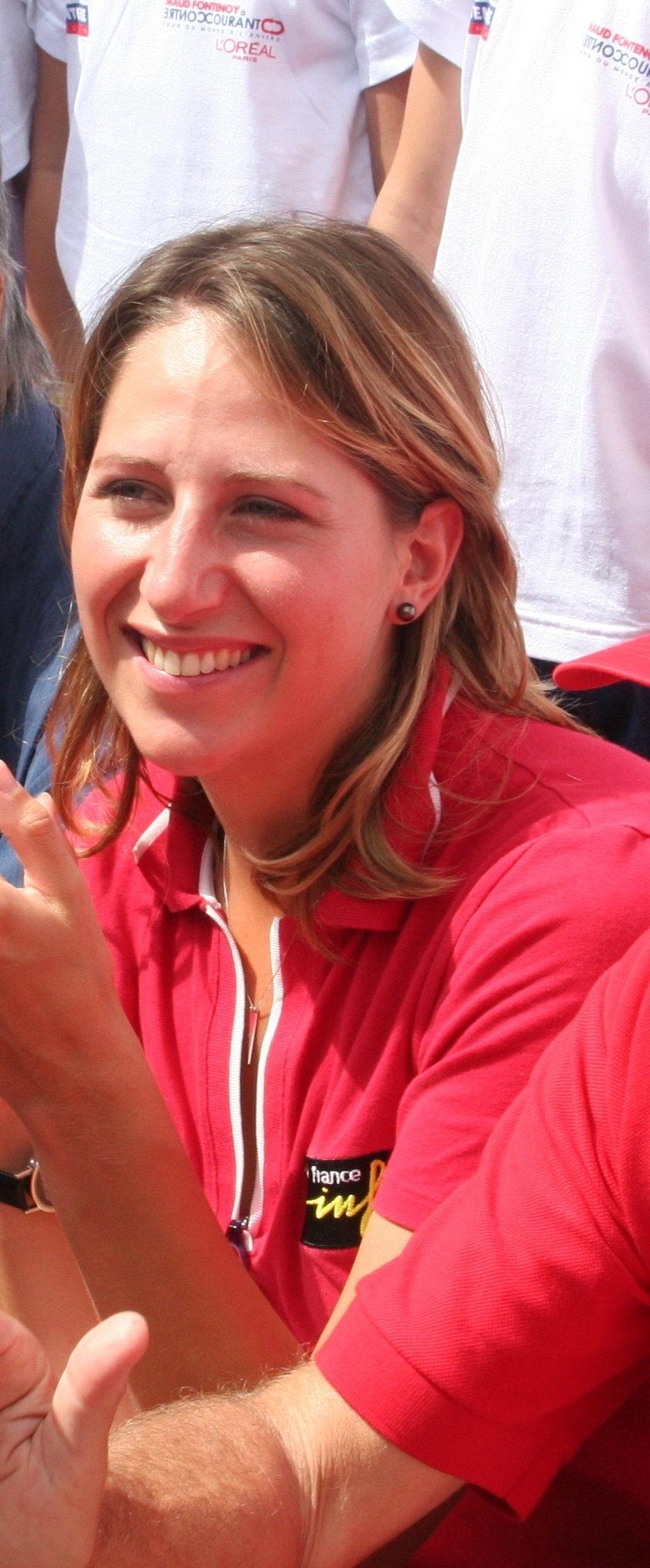
- Born: 7 September 1977 (age 48); Meaux, France
- Occupation: Sailor
- Spouse: Olivier Chartier
- Children: 5

Maud Fontenoy (born 7 September 1977) is a French sailor known for her rowings across the Atlantic (2003) and Pacific (2005) oceans.

== Career ==
Most recently, Fontenay completed a sailing trip around the Antarctic alone, against prevailing winds. Departing from Réunion island on 15 October 2006, she crossed the finish line on 14 March 2007, having sailed for 14,500 km (9,000 mi). (Note: However, this sailing trip is not accepted as an official sailing "around the globe". This has been made clear in the newsletter no. 128 by the World Sailing Speed Record Council, which states that "The WSSR Rule for Around the World - rule 26a - calls for a minimum orthodromic track distance of the vessel of at least 21,600 nautical miles (the distance of the great circle)" The Courses Offshore. WSSRC newsletter no 128 regarding Maud de Fontenoy)

Fontenoy was named the UNESCO’s Intergovernmental Oceanographic Commission and the World Ocean Network Spokesperson for the Ocean on 3 June 2009

== Other activities ==
- Vivendi, Member of the Board of Directors (since 2023)

== Personal life ==
Fontenoy has five children: Mahé (with boyfriend Thomas Vollaire), Hina (with an unknown man), Loup (with boyfriend Raphaël Enthoven), and Côme and Eléa (with husband Olivier Chartier).

== Distinctions ==
- France: National Order of Merit (12 July 2007)
