= Prix Suzanne Bianchetti =

French film award

The Prix Suzanne Bianchetti is an award in French cinema given annually since 1937 to the most promising young film actress.

The award was created by writer and actor René Jeanne who served as the director of L'Etablissement Cinématographique des Armées. When his wife, the actress Suzanne Bianchetti, died in 1936 at the age of 47, he established an award dedicated to her memory to be given annually to the most promising young actress.

The award was given for the first time in 1937 to actress Junie Astor for her performance in the film Women's Club. The award comes in the form of a medallion engraved with Suzanne Bianchetti's image. Since its inception, the Prix Suzanne Bianchetti has been awarded to many of the greatest names in French cinema who went on to national and international stardom.

== List of winners (incomplete) ==
- 1937 – Junie Astor (Women's Club, 1936)
- 1938 – Janine Darcey
- 1939 – Sylvia Bataille
- 1940 – Micheline Presle (Girls in Distress, 1939)
- 1941–1945 no award due to World War II
- 1947 – Simone Signoret (Back Streets of Paris, 1946)
- 1948 – Odile Versois
- 1949 – Arlette Thomas
- 1950 – Christiane Lenier
- 1951 – Nadine Alari
- 1952 – Nadine Basile
- 1953 – Etchika Choureau (The Other Side of Paradise, 1953)
- 1954 – Marina Vlady
- 1955 – Geneviève Kervine
- 1956 – Annie Girardot (L'Homme aux clefs d'or, 1956)
- 1957 – Anne Doat
- 1958 – Pascale Petit (One Life, 1957)
- 1959 – Roger Dumas (awarded to a male actor)
- 1960 – Perrette Pradier
- 1961 – Renée Marie Potet
- 1962 – Corinne Marchand
- 1963 – Marie Dubois
- 1964 – Colette Castel
- 1965 – Macha Méril
- 1966 – Geneviève Bujold (The Thief of Paris, 1967)
- 1967 – Caroline Cellier (awarded for a stage performance in Pygmalion)
- 1968 – Danièle Évenou
- 1970 – Ludmila Mikaël
- 1972 – Bulle Ogier
- 1974 – Isabelle Adjani (The Slap, 1974)
- 1976 – Isabelle Huppert (The Judge and the Assassin, 1976)
- 1980 – Dominique Laffin
- 1986 – Juliette Binoche (Mauvais Sang, 1986)
- 1988 – Marianne Basler
- 1990 – Dominique Blanc
- 1991 – Anouk Grinberg
- 1993 – Charlotte Kady
- 1994 – Isabelle Carré
- 1995 – Clotilde Courau
- 1996 – Sandrine Kiberlain
- 1998 – Virginie Ledoyen
- 2000 – Audrey Tautou
- 2001 – Barbara Schulz
- 2002 – Françoise Gillard
- 2003 – Mélanie Doutey
- 2004 – Sara Forestier and Sophie Quinton
- 2005 – Chloé Lambert
- 2006 – Nathalie Boutefeu
- 2007 – Déborah François
- 2008 – Clotilde Hesme
- 2009 – Àstrid Bergès-Frisbey
- 2010 – Elodie Navarre
- 2011 – Anaïs Demoustier
- 2012 – Marie Kremer
- 2013 – Pauline Étienne
- 2014 – Adèle Haenel
- 2015 – Marine Vacth
- 2016 – Camille Cottin
- 2017 – Suliane Brahim
- 2018 – Camélia Jordana
- 2019 – Rebecca Marder
- 2020 – Mame Sane
- 2021 – Céleste Brunnquell
- 2022 – Luàna Bajrami
- 2023 – Mallory Wanecque
- 2024 – Souheila Yacoub
- 2025 – Lilith Grasmug and Josefa Heinsius
