= Adèle Van Reeth =

French philosopher and radio producer

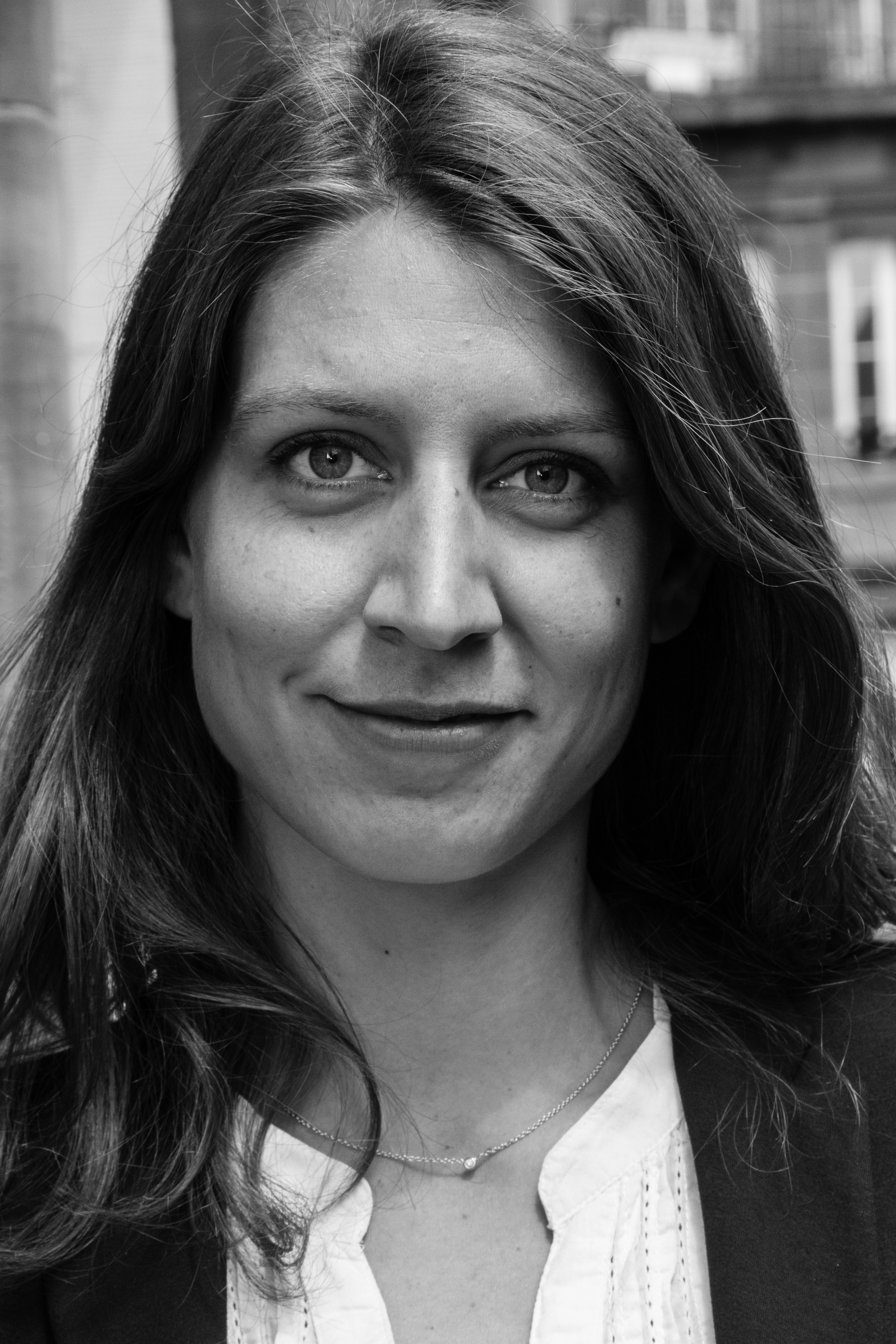
- Adèle Van Reeth in 2013

Director of France Inter
- Incumbent
- Assumed office August 2022
- Preceded by: Laurence Bloch

Personal details
- Born: 16 December 1982 (age 43) Saint-Germain-en-Laye, France
- Domestic partner: Raphaël Enthoven
- Children: 2
- Education: École normale supérieure de Fontenay-Saint-Cloud
- Profession: Philosopher

Adèle Van Reeth (born 1982) is a French philosopher, radio producer and columnist.

== Life ==
=== Studies, family ===
Van Reeth is the only daughter in a family of four children. She is of Flemish origin by her paternal grandfather. Daughter of an archivist, she moved a lot in her childhood due to her father's assignments.

When she was 15 she spent one year in New Zealand. After studying architecture for a few months, she joined a khâgne where she prepared for the entrance exam to the École normale supérieure de Lyon. Once admitted, she went for the second year of study at the University of Chicago. . She had two children with her partner Raphaël Enthoven, Zadig, born in 2016, and Marcel, born in 2021.

=== Career ===
A specialist in film philosophy former student of the École normale supérieure de Fontenay-Saint-Cloud (promotion 2005) Van Reeth works and intervenes on the question of the ordinary, based in particular on the work of the philosopher Stanley Cavell.

While she is eligible for the oral examinations of the philosophy agrégation, she finally prefers to leave this path to work in radio. Since September 2011, on France Culture, she has been producing and hosting the daily philosophy program Les Nouveaux Chemins de la connaissance alongside Raphaël Enthoven which was renamed Les Chemins de la philosophie in 2017. In December 2012, this program became the most downloaded show of Radio France, and maintains this position from time to time.

After having participated in the show Ça balance à Paris in 2011 and collaborated on Philosophie magazine (2010–12), she is a regular columnist for the program Le Cercle, hosted by Frédéric Beigbeder on Canal+ Cinéma.

In March 2014, she launched a series entitled "Questions de Caractère". (co-edition Plon (publisher) / France Culture): she interacts with contemporary philosophers while keeping the spirit and approach of her program. The first volume, co-written with Jean-Luc Nancy, deals with jouissance, a theme on which she has already spoken several times. On December 19, 2017, it was announced that Van Reeth would take over from Jean-Pierre Elkabbach and host the new literary program of Public Sénat, still recorded in the Senate Library, Livres & Vous.

From September 2018, she hosted the show d'art d'art ! on France 2.

As of August 29, 2022, she is the director of France Inter, the leading radio station in the country.

== Publications ==
- La Jouissance in collaboration with Jean-Luc Nancy, co-edition Plon / France culture, 2014.
- Réussir le bac philo, under the direction of Adèle Van Reeth, Fayard, 2014.
- La Méchanceté in collaboration with Michaël Fœssel, co-edition Plon / France culture, 2014.
- L’Obstination in collaboration with Myriam Revault d'Allonnes, co-édition Plon / France culture, 2014.
- Le Snobisme in collaboration with Raphaël Enthoven, co-edition Plon / France culture, 2015.
- La Pudeur, in collaboration with Éric Fiat, co-edition Plon / France culture, 2016.
- Questions de caractère (compiles five themes addressed in the program: jouissance, malice, obstinacy, snobbery and modesty)

== See also ==
- Women in philosophy
- List of women philosophers
- Jean-Luc Nancy
