= Les Chemins de la philosophie =

Les Chemins de la philosophie (The Ways of Philosophy) (previously entitled Les Nouveaux Chemins de la connaissance (The New Ways of Knowledge) until 2017) is a French philosophy radio program broadcast daily on France Culture and presented by Adèle Van Reeth. In 2017, the show is the most downloaded podcast of the radio station.

== History ==
The program, first called Les chemins de la connaissance, then renamed Les Nouveaux Chemins de la connaissance, was hosted by Raphaël Enthoven from 2007 to 2011. Van Reeth, collaborator and columnist on the show, succeeded him. At the beginning of 2017, she renamed the program Les Chemins de la philosophie, fully assuming the philosophical character of the program. It was the most downloaded show on France Culture (two million downloads per month, on average, in 2017.)

According to van Reeth, the success of the program is due to its transversal approach and the abandonment of the teaching tone, often criticized against France Culture, without giving in to a certain intellectual slackness: "Pedagogy implies setting a threshold of requirement while trying to say things that seem complicated clearly," she reports to the newspaper Libération.
