= Justine Lévy =

French book editor and author (born 1974)

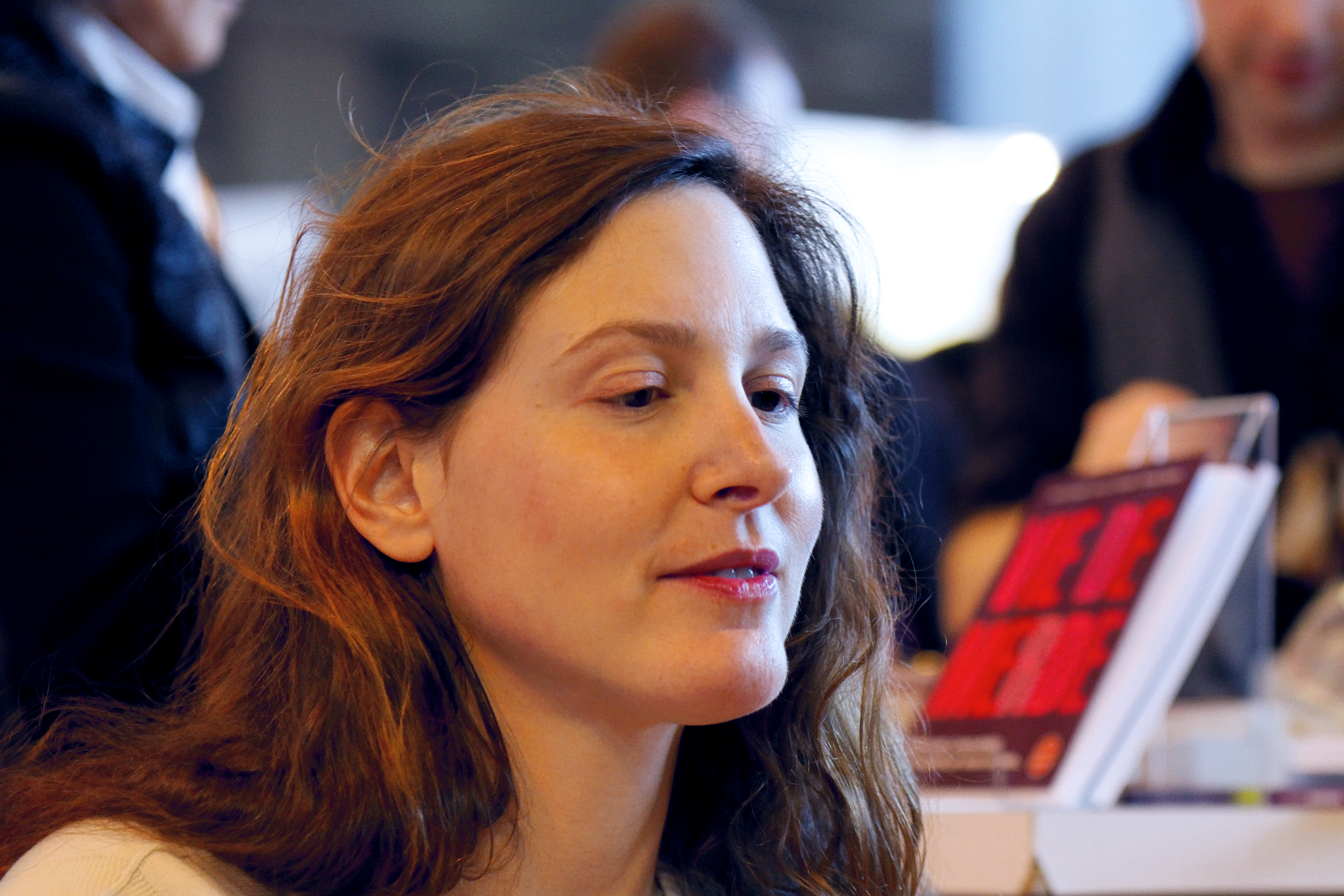
- Lévy in Paris (2011)
- Born: 4 September 1974 (age 51); Paris, France
- Occupation: Author
- Spouses: Raphaël Enthoven (m. 1996; div. 2001) Patrick Mille (m. 2023)
- Children: 2
- Parent(s): Bernard-Henri Lévy; Isabelle Doutreluigne

Justine-Juliette Lévy (born 4 September 1974) is a French book editor and author.

== Life and career ==
Lévy is the eldest daughter of Isabelle Doutreluigne and French philosopher, writer, and media personality, Bernard-Henri Lévy. Her 1995 debut novel "Le Rendez-vous" (The Rendezvous) was translated from French into English and published in the United States in 1997.

On 21 September 1996 she married Raphaël Enthoven, the son of her father's best friend, Jean-Paul Enthoven, who left her in 2000 for model and singer, Carla Bruni (at the time his father's girlfriend and who is now married to former French President Nicolas Sarkozy). She wrote a novel whose story paralleled her own life. The 2004 book was released in France under the title "Rien de Grave" (published in English in 2005 as Nothing Serious). The winner of the first Prix Littéraire Le Vaudeville, her book knocked The Da Vinci Code from Europe's bestseller lists. It was published in the United States in October 2005.

Lévy has two children with actor and director Patrick Mille. She describes her relationship with Patrick as "not married, but like married". Like Nothing Serious protagonist Louise, Lévy is also a little cynical about monogamy. Lévy married Patrick on 11 March 2023 in the Parisian 6th arrondissement's town hall after 22 years together.

== Books ==
- 1997: Le rendez-vous (The Rendezvous) - Scribner, ISBN 0-684-82579-1, awarded the Prix Contrepoint in 1996
- 2005: Rien de grave (Nothing Serious) - Melville House Publishing, ISBN 0-9761407-7-2
- 2009: Mauvaise fille (Bad Girl) - Stock, ISBN 2-234-05864-3 (Adapted to the 2012 movie of the same name)
- 2014: La gaieté (Happiness) - Stock, ISBN 978-2234070264
- 2019: Histoires de familles (Family History) - with The Anonymous Project - Flammarion, ISBN 978-2081440395
- 2021: Son fils (Her Son) - Stock, ISBN 978-2234083233
- 2025: Une drôle de peine (A Strange Sorrow) - Stock, ISBN 978-2234094048
