= Jean-Philippe de Tonnac =

Jean-Philippe de Tonnac is a French novelist, essayist, and journalist who directed the special editions of the Nouvel Observateur. He is the author of about twenty published books, among them "The Asexual Revolution" (2006).

== Publications ==
=== Essays ===
- Qui vive ?, textes rassemblés en hommage à Julien Gracq, éd. José Corti, Paris, 1989
- Les Promenades de Hermann Hesse, photos de Daniel Faure, Le Chêne, Paris, 1996
- Les Hauts Lieux sacrés de France, photos de Daniel Faure, Le Chêne, Paris, 1997
- [Biographie] René Daumal, l'archange, éd. Grasset, Paris, 1998
- Révérence à la vie, conversations avec Théodore Monod, éd. Grasset, Paris, 2002
- Anorexia, Enquête sur l'expérience de la faim, éd. Albin Michel, Paris, 2005
- La Révolution asexuelle : Ne pas faire l'amour, un nouveau phénomène de société, éd. Albin Michel, Paris, 2006, ISBN 2-226-17257-2
- Bob Marley, Folio Biographies n°69, 2010 - ISBN 978-2-070-34239-6
- Jean-Philippe de Tonnac (dir.) - Stephen Laurence Kaplan (intro.), Dictionnaire universel du pain, éd. Robert Laffont, coll. « Bouquins », Paris, 2010, ISBN 978-2-221-11200-7

=== Novels ===
- Père des brouillards, éd. Fayard, 2002
- Azyme, AzymeActes sud, 2016
