= Jean-Paul Enthoven =

French publisher and journalist (born 1949)

- Born: 11 January 1949 (age 77); Mascara, French Algeria
- Education: Lycée Janson-de-Sailly; Sciences Po
- Occupations: Publisher; Journalist
- Children: 3 (including Raphaël Enthoven)

Jean-Paul Enthoven (born 11 January 1949) is a French publisher and journalist.

== Biography ==
=== Early life and education ===
Born in Mascara near Oran in French Algeria, Enthoven comes from a bourgeois Jewish family. His mother was born Gilberte Tordjman and his father, Edmond Enthoven, was a businessman who made his fortune in real estate and cinema management. In this completely agnostic Jewish family environment, his political socialization took place in a very republican atmosphere, attached to moral considerations such as the defence of human rights and found himself in the political figure of a Clemenceau.

His family was linked to the Oranese notably with philosopher André Bénichou, director of the Descartes course which many French academics attended during the Algerian War. Thus his parents became close to Pierre Nora and the latter helped their son when he became a boarder at Lycée Lakanal in Sceaux. Jean-Paul Enthoven was then very close to the "Nora family", Pierre Nora being its "Cicerone".

After attending the lycée Buffon, he entered the lycée Janson-de-Sailly where he took philosophy classes from Maurice Clavel. The latter noticed him among the heads of the class and made him meet Gabriel Marcel but especially Pierre Boutang whose influence plunged him for a time into "self-hatred".

He was then a student at the Faculty of Letters at Paris-Sorbonne and at the Faculté de droit de Paris. He obtained a degree in history, a diploma from the Institute of Political Studies, a DES in public law and political science.

=== Career ===
Although anchored on the left, he missed May 68 by preferring literature to ideological debates. The readings he made at Éditions Gallimard around 1971/1972 gave him the opportunity to meet Raymond Aron. If he did not become a disciple, the latter led him to detach himself very quickly from a Marxism to which readings had led him to adhere. He defined himself as Spinozo-nietzschean when, in 1973, he became assistant to Maurice Duverger at the Sorbonne. An assistant at the university Paris I - Panthéon Sorbonne from 1973 to 1975, he meets a young philosopher who has just returned from Bangladesh, Bernard-Henri Lévy. Falling under the spell of the normalien, he presented him in the autumn of 1974 to his friend Gilles Hertzog, who thus participated in the life of the ephemeral daily L'Imprévu (January–February 1975). Despite the failure of Bernard-Henri Lévy's daily, the trio's friendship grew stronger around him to the point of appearing to be a true "sibling" where Jean-Paul Enthoven would, in his own words, be "Bernard's Minister of the Interior, and Gilles, his State Secretary for Foreign Affairs".

At the same time, his ties with Pierre Nora brought him into contact with Jean Daniel and the staff of Le Nouvel Observateur.

From December 1973 onwards, he published reviews of essays in philosophy and human sciences. It was then that in 1975, he did not appreciate being solicited by Maurice Duverger as a character witness in a trial about his Vichyst past. He thus resigned from teaching and turned to journalism. He was a journalist and then assistant to the chief editor of Le Nouvel Observateur until 1984. He was responsible for covering intellectual debates, interviews with leading intellectual figures, reviews of political and philosophical essays, and all current events affecting the intellectual world.

Close to Maurice Clavel - whom he occasionally replaces for his television column - he is nonetheless much appreciated by the editor of the newspaper who consults him for the choice of a word in his editorial or the ongoing debates in the Parisian microcosm. With the latter two, he actively supports the media blossoming of the "Nouveaux Philosophes" and their leader, his friend Bernard-Henri Lévy. He admired the latter immensely and had such strong ties with him that all they lacked was "to be homosexual in order to mix and mingle", even more than they are. Witness at his wedding (like Gilles Hertzog), having breakfast every Saturday morning with him, he shares his passions as his concern for aesthetic appearance.

From the early 1980s, he took on more and more editorial responsibilities. Thus, in 1983, he took over the direction of the "Biblio-Essais" series founded by Bernard-Henri Lévy at Grasset. In 1984, he left his position as Assistant Editor-in-Chief of the Nouvel Observateur to head the Hachette-Littérature publishing house.

In 1986, he returned to the publishing house Grasset & Fasquelle as editorial director.

Since 1993, he has been an editorial advisor to the editorial board of the weekly magazine Le Point where he publishes literary reviews.

In 1997, he co-wrote the film Day and Night with Bernard-Henri Lévy.

Since 2011, he has been a member of the jury of the prix Saint-Germain.

== Private life ==
Enthoven is the father of three children with Catherine David:

- Raphaël, agrégé in philosophy who married Justine Lévy, the daughter of the family's great friend Bernard-Henri Lévy, before leaving her for Carla Bruni.
- Julien, second role actor seen in particular in 2009 in Cineman by Yann Moix with Franck Dubosc as well as in the new version of The Accursed Kings in 2005.
- and Mathilde, a journalist.

On 4 December 1981, Jean-Paul Enthoven married Corinne Pécas, daughter of Max Pécas, director and producer of erotic films. In 2000, he was Carla Bruni's companion, before she left him for his own son Raphaël, who was the subject of her song "Raphaël", and with whom she has a son, Aurélien, born in 2001.

Jean-Paul Enthoven, divorced from Corinne Pécas, is today the husband of the Italian-Argentine journalist Patricia Della Giovampaola, widow of Rodolphe de Belzunce d'Arenberg.

In September 2020 he publicly disowned his son Raphaël, after the latter published an autobiography. Enthoven complained about his private life being made public, asking his son to "show restraint" and cut off all contact.

== Works ==
- Les Enfants de Saturne, Grasset, 1996, prix Cazes-Lipp and prix Valery-Larbaud in 1997,ISBN 978-2246265313
- Aurore, Grasset, 2001, prix du livre Europe 1 in 2001, ISBN 978-2246611615
- La Dernière Femme, Grasset, 2006, prix Nice Baie des anges en 2006,ISBN 978-2246659112
- Ce que nous avons eu de meilleur, Grasset, 2008 ISBN 978-2246705413
- L'Hypothèse des sentiments, Grasset, 2012
- Dictionnaire amoureux de Proust, with Raphaël Enthoven, Plon, 2013 ISBN 978-2259211109 - prix Femina essai 2013
- Saisons de papier, Grasset, 2016 ISBN 978-2246802907
- Ce qui plaisait à Blanche, Grasset, 2020, ISBN 978-2246802884
- Les raisons du coeur, Grasset, 2021, ISBN 978-2246824596

In November 2007 he took part in the shooting of Cinéman, a film by his friend Yann Moix in which his son Julien Enthoven played a part.

== Distinctions ==
Enthoven is an officier of the Ordre des Arts et des Lettres.
