= Little French Songs =

Studio album by Carla Bruni
- Released: 29 March 2013
- Recorded: 2012
- Studio: Labomatic (Paris)
- Genre: Chanson
- Language: French
- Label: Teorema; Barclay
- Producer: Bénédicte Schmitt

Carla Bruni chronology
Comme si de rien n'était (2008)	Little French Songs (2013)	French Touch (2017)

Singles from Little French Songs
- 1. "Chez Keith et Anita" Released: 2013; 2. "J'arrive à toi" Released: 2013; 3. "Mon Raymond" Released: 2013

Little French Songs is the fourth studio album by Italian-French singer Carla Bruni. It was recorded during 2012 and released on 29 March 2013 on Teorema and Barclay in France, and on 16 April 2013 in United Kingdom on Verve.

Professional ratings
Review scores
Source	Rating
AllMusic	3.5/5 stars

== Track listing ==
1. "J'arrive à toi" (3:04)
2. "Chez Keith et Anita" (3:00)
3. "Prière" (3:26)
4. "Mon Raymond" (3:10)
5. "Dolce Francia" (3:55)
6. "Pas une dame" (2:57)
7. "Darling" (3:21)
8. "La Valse posthume" (short version) (2:27)
9. "Little French Song" (2:55)
10. "Liberté" (3:38)
11. "Le Pingouin" (2:18)

Deluxe edition

A deluxe edition was released containing two additional bonus tracks, titled "Le blonde Exquise" and "Luna", as well as a longer version of the track "La valse posthume". The deluxe edition also includes a Blu-ray pure audio version of the tracks and a DVD containing an acoustic live session of Bruni.

1. "J'arrive à toi" (3:05)
2. "Mon Raymond" (3:10)
3. "Prière" (3:25)
4. "Pas une dame" (2:57)
5. "Dolce Francia" (3:55)
6. "Chez Keith et Anita" (2:59)
7. "Darling" (3:21)
8. "La valse posthume" (long track) (3:19)
9. "La blonde exquise" [bonus track] (3:08)
10. "Liberté" (3:37)
11. "Little French Song" (2:55)
12. "Lune [Bonus]" (3:12)
13. "Le pingouin" (2:18)

== Personnel ==
Credits for Little French Songs adapted from liner notes.

- Carla Bruni – vocals
- Dominique Blanc-Francard – mastering
- Richard Dumas – photography
- Bénédicte Schmitt – engineering, mixing, production
- Jérôme Witz – artwork

== Charts ==
=== Weekly charts ===
Weekly chart performance for Little French Songs
Chart (2013)	Peak position
Austrian Albums (Ö3 Austria)	26
Belgian Albums (Ultratop Flanders)	8
Belgian Albums (Ultratop Wallonia)	8
Czech Albums (ČNS IFPI)	22
French Albums (SNEP)	2
German Albums (Offizielle Top 100)	28
Italian Albums (FIMI)	92
Polish Albums (ZPAV)	18
Spanish Albums (Promusicae)	68
Swiss Albums (Schweizer Hitparade)	30
US Heatseekers Albums (Billboard)	4
US World Albums (Billboard)	1

=== Year-end charts ===
Year-end chart performance for Little French Songs
Chart (2013)	Position
Belgian Albums (Ultratop Flanders)	141
Belgian Albums (Ultratop Wallonia)	111
French Albums (SNEP)	65
US World Albums (Billboard)	7

== Certifications ==
Certifications for Little French Songs
Region	Certification	Certified units/sales
France (SNEP)	Platinum	100,000^{*}
^{*} Sales figures based on certification alone.
