= Comme si de rien n'était =

Studio album by Carla Bruni
- Released: 11 July 2008
- Recorded: 2007–2008
- Studio: Labomatic (Paris)
- Genre: Folk; chanson
- Length: 42:21
- Label: Naïve
- Producer: Dominique Blanc-Francard

Carla Bruni chronology
No Promises (2007)	Comme si de rien n'était (2008)	Little French Songs (2013)

Singles from Comme si de rien n'était
- 1. "L'Amoureuse" Released: 9 July 2008

Comme si de rien n'était (English: As If Nothing Had Happened) is the third studio album by Italian-French singer Carla Bruni, released on 11 July 2008 by Naïve Records.

== Composition and production ==
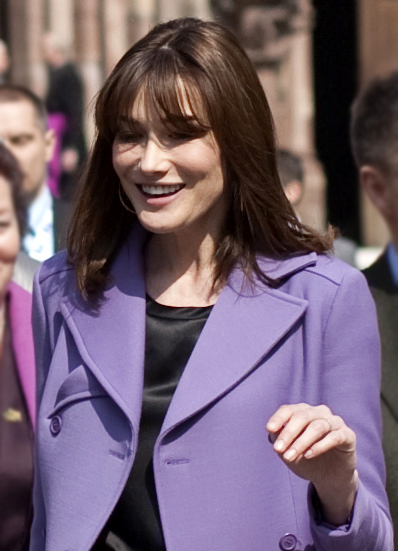
Bruni at the 2009 NATO summit, for the campaign, April 2009

The album Comme si de rien n'était followed the No Promises album, which had sold about 500,000 copies worldwide. This third album included 14 tracks, all of them composed by Bruni, with the exception of two songs written in collaboration with French novelist Michel Houellebecq and the singer Julien Clerc, a cover of You Belong To Me, and a cover of a song of the Italian singer Francesco Guccini (Il vecchio e il bambino).

The production was by Dominique Blanc-Francard. The cover was designed by Jean-Baptiste Mondino. The first single was "L'amoureuse". The proceeds from the sale of the album were to be donated to the "Fondation de France" to be used for humanitarian causes.

=== Style and influences ===
The album has a contemporary country music feel that has evolved from a rural American folk tradition. It features traditional folk music merged with rock and roll to form folk rock. Since the 1970s, a genre of "contemporary folk" fueled by new singer-songwriters has continued with such artists as Chris Castle, Steve Goodman, and John Prine. Filk music can be considered folk music stylistically and culturally (although the 'community' it arose from, science fiction fandom, is an unusual and thoroughly modern one). The genre is largely European, especially in France. The songs are primarily written by Bruni, though two are covers, and one (track 2) is an arrangement of an excerpt from a novel. In contrast to the spare production of Bruni's earlier albums, Comme features extensive instrumentation, the new producer Dominique Blanc-Francard, saying that he was trying to "amplify Carla's limited harmonic system", although the production is accused of rather "drowning it out". "Ma Jeunesse", the first song from the album, begins with piano and it talks about love and young people in general. "La possibilité d'une île" is adapted from the French novel "The Possibility of an Island" by Michel Houellebecq. "L'Amoureuse" talks about a woman in love and represents a good perspective of French music. "Tu es ma came", which compares the intensity of passion to a drug-induced "fix", caused controversy due to the line "more dangerous than Colombian white [cocaine]", which provoked comment from the Colombian government. The preceding line "more lethal than heroin from Afghanistan" is not known to have provoked comment from the Afghan government. "Salut marin" (roughly, "Hello, Sailor"), a very personal song from the album, is a farewell to her brother Virginio Bruni Tedeschi, who died in 2006 from complications of HIV/AIDS. "Ta tienne" and "Péché d'envie" are folk songs written by Bruni. "You Belong to Me": In English, this song by Chilton Price, Pee Wee King, Redd Stewart is generally referred to as a cover of the version by Bob Dylan and was later included in the film The Boys Are Back, starring Clive Owen. "Le Temps perdu" and "Déranger les pierres" are songs written by Bruni. "Je suis une enfant" is the eleventh song from the album. This track was praised as the strongest by Le Figaro. "L'Antilope" was written by Frédéric Koella. "Notre grand amour est mort" is a love song that talks about a relationship between a woman and a man. "Il vecchio e il bambino" is an Italian song by Francesco Guccini.

=== Release and promotion ===
"We had to cancel her international tour for security reasons but also because (French) people might not have accepted that their first lady would be onstage"
– said Bertrand De Labbey, CEO of talent agency VMA, who manages Bruni's music career.

Bruni's media profile has been particularly prominent in recent months, thanks to widely circulated holiday photos in August, her appearance on the cover of the 11 September UK edition of The Economist for a story about her husband's slump in popularity and a salacious new biography, "Carla et les Ambitieux" by Michael Darmon and Yves Derai, which has received heavy press coverage. Reports recently surfaced in the French media that Sarkozy's aides had requested she delay her planned musical comeback due to fears that it could be politically damaging amid the current wave of French protests and strikes over economic reforms. Small wonder that, as Bruni continues writing songs for her fourth album, due in 2011, her team is contemplating how to balance her musical career with her status as first lady of France. That status caused problems when Bruni's third album, Comme si de rien n'était, was released in July 2008, five months after she married Sarkozy.

To promote the album, Bruni performed concerts featuring all the songs from Comme si de rien n'était, passing through France, Belgium, Switzerland, Spain, Germany, Italy, the United Kingdom, Portugal, Canada and the United States.

The artwork for the album shows an image of Bruni standing next to a lake with the title in the center of the cover. The album was released in Digipack. An accompanying book shows the lyrics of the songs and there are drawings of different shapes made by Florence Deygas. The artwork shots were made by "Add a dog", a company in Paris.

The album title, Comme si de rien n'était (As If Nothing Had Happened), summarizes the content of the songs.

=== Singles ===
The single "L'Amoureuse" was released on 9 July 2008 as the only single from the album. A music video was made for it, which features projections of the city of Paris with animated cartoons representing Carla while the images of the cities are being projected.

== Critical reception ==
Professional ratings
Review scores
Source	Rating
AllMusic	4/5 stars
Barnes & Noble	4/5 stars
BBC Music	Favourable
The Daily Telegraph	Favourable
The Guardian	2/5 stars
musicOMH	2.5/5 stars
Okayplayer	68/100
San Francisco Chronicle	Favourable
Virgin Media	2.5/5 stars

Tim Sendra from AllMusic said:

"The title of Carla Bruni's 2008 album, Comme Si de Rien N'Etait (As If Nothing Had Happened), is a good joke. After all, since her last album Bruni fell into a whirlwind romance with French President Nicolas Sarkozy and ended up marrying him and becoming the "First Lady" of France. That's a pretty big "something", and indeed it isn't often that the romance of a singer and a president is chronicled on record as it is here—though you need to be fluent in French to catch the details, since only her cover of '50s pop classic "You Belong to Me" (which is a witty nod to a semi-scandalous trip the couple took to Egypt and other exotic locales before they were wed) is in English. You don't need to know exactly what's going on lyrically, because the intimate-sounding arrangements on the ballads and the light and breezy sound of the more uptempo tunes clue you in that there is romance in the air. Along with the nice arrangements, the best thing about the album is Bruni's intimate and sultry singing. She can purr like a Gainsbourg girl, strut sassily, or croon quite tenderly—sometimes all within the same song. Most of the time she sounds like you always hoped a '60s French bombshell would sound but never quite did (think Bardot or Birkin). Not surprisingly, Bruni appears totally in control throughout the album, which could be down to her having written almost all of the songs herself, or could be down to her new position in the world. Whatever the reason, it makes for quite an improvement over her previous album, No Promises, and fulfills the promise of her charming debut, Quelqu'un M'a Dit. It is probably the best album released by a "First Lady", but beyond that, it's a pleasant, sometimes compelling album by a singer/songwriter with some stories to tell and a lovely way of telling them."

BBC said:

"Bruni's disc may not win her new fans in the stolidly un-French speaking UK. But removed from the context of her very public private life, this is a charming album."

The Telegraph said:

"The Premiere Dame may have a colourful past, but her music has always been as classically chic and subtly sexy as her Christian Dior wardrobe."

SFGate said:

"Even before she married French president Nicolas Sarkozy, Carla Bruni had a thing for prominent men such as Mick Jagger and Donald Trump. So even though the lyrics on her third album, "Comme Si de Rien N'Etait" ("As If Nothing Happened"), were written before her latest romantic coup, it's hard to separate content from context, especially when, in the song "Tu Es Ma Came", the singer describes her lover as "more dangerous than Colombian white". But the mild-mannered music hardly matches the exuberance of lines like that. Slathered with strings, horns, and folk and blues guitars, Bruni's new album is not quite as charming as her 2003 premiere, "Quelqu'un M'a Dit". Still, songs such as "L'Amoureuse" and "Déranger Les Pierres" are quite beautiful, and "Salut Marin", a tribute to her late brother, might represent one of Bruni's finest recorded moments yet."

== Commercial response ==
Comme si de rien n'était debuted at number three on the French Albums Chart the day after its release, selling 14,130 copies in two days. The week after, it climbed to number one with 18,248 copies, before dropping to number two with 13,364 copies. After this impressive start, sales slowed and only 80,000 CDs were sold in the two months following its release. This represents barely the half of the printed copies It is far less than expected, as Bruni's first album sold two million copies.

== Track listing ==
No.	Title	Writer(s)	Length
1.	"Ma jeunesse (My Youth)"	Carla Bruni	2:34
2.	"La Possibilité d'une île (The Possibility of an Island)"	Bruni, Michel Houellebecq	3:57
3.	"L'Amoureuse (In Love)"	Bruni	3:03
4.	"Tu es ma came (You Are My Drug)"	Bruni	3:02
5.	"Salut marin (Hello Sailor)"	Bruni, Taofik Farah	2:52
6.	"Ta tienne (Your yours )"	Bruni	2:40
7.	"Péché d'envie (Sin of Envy)"	Bruni, Raphaël Enthoven	2:54
8.	"You Belong to Me"	Chilton Price, Pee Wee King, Redd Stewart	2:59
9.	"Le Temps perdu (Lost Time)"	Bruni	2:44
10.	"Déranger les pierres (Disturbing the Stones)"	Bruni, Julien Clerc	3:13
11.	"Je suis une enfant (I Am a Child)"	Bruni	3:07
12.	"L'Antilope (The Antelope)"	Bruni, Frédéric Koella	2:02
13.	"Notre grand amour est mort (Our Great Love Is Dead)"	Bruni	3:25
14.	"Il vecchio e il bambino (The Old Man and the Boy)"	Francesco Guccini	3:23

== Personnel ==
- Carla Bruni – Vocals
- Dominique Blanc-Francard – piano, electric guitar, acoustic guitar, autoharp, bass guitar, percussion, string bass, tambourine, organ, vibraphone, string quartet
- Denis Benarrosh – drums, percussion
- Laurent Vernerey – bas guitar, double bass
- Freddy Koella – electric and acoustic guitar, baryton, dobro, banjo, violin, mandolin
- Michel Amsellem – rhodes piano, piano, keyboards
- Charles Pasi – harmonica
- Thierry Farrugia – flute, soprano saxophone, clarinet
- Benjamin Blanc-Francard – string arrangements
- Christophe Morin – cello
- Karen Brunon – 1st violin
- Elsa Benabdallah – 2nd violin
- Florent Brémond – alto
- Recorded by Bènèdicte Schmitt at Labomatic Studios, Paris
- Produced, mixed and mastered by Dominique Blanc-Francard at Labomotic Studios, Paris
- Cover photo – Jean-Baptiste Mondino
- Inside photo – Jean-Baptiste Mondino and "Comme si de rien n'était" by Virginio Bruni Tedeschi
- Drawings – Florence Deygas
- Artwork – Add a dog, Paris

== Charts ==
=== Weekly charts ===
Weekly chart performance for Comme si de rien n'était
Chart (2008)	Peak position
Argentine Albums (CAPIF)	7
Australian Albums (ARIA Charts)	97
Austrian Albums (Ö3 Austria)	10
Belgian Albums (Ultratop Flanders)	6
Belgian Albums (Ultratop Wallonia)	2
Canadian Albums (Billboard)	15
Danish Albums (Hitlisten)	38
Dutch Albums (Album Top 100)	31
European Albums (Billboard)	3
Finnish Albums (Suomen virallinen lista)	23
French Albums (SNEP)	1
German Albums (Offizielle Top 100)	15
Italian Albums (FIMI)	21
Polish Albums (ZPAV)	29
Portuguese Albums (AFP)	21
Spanish Albums (PROMUSICAE)	32
Swiss Albums (Schweizer Hitparade)	3
UK Albums (OCC)	58
UK Independent Albums (OCC)	8
US Billboard 200	195
US Heatseekers Albums (Billboard)	8
US Independent Albums (Billboard)	35
US World Albums (Billboard)	1

=== Year-end charts ===
Year-end chart performance for Comme si de rien n'était
Chart (2008)	Position
Belgian Albums (Ultratop Flanders)	78
Belgian Albums (Ultratop Wallonia)	64
European Albums (Billboard)	84
French Albums (SNEP)	34
Swiss Albums (Schweizer Hitparade)	90
US World Albums (Billboard)	14

== Certifications and sales ==
Certifications and sales for Comme si de rien n'était
Region	Certification	Certified units/sales
Belgium (BRMA)	Gold	15,000^{*}
France	—	193,000
United Kingdom	—	13,300
Summaries
Worldwide	—	481,000
^{*} Sales figures based on certification alone.

== Release history ==
Release history for Comme si de rien n'était
Region	Date
France	11 July 2008
Spain	11 July 2008
Switzerland	11 July 2008
Belgium	11 July 2008
Italy	11 July 2008
Ireland	11 July 2008
Germany	11 July 2008
United Kingdom	14 July 2008
Portugal	14 July 2008
Canada	15 July 2008
United States	22 July 2008 (digital)
United States	5 August 2008 (physical)
Brazil	8 August 2008
Argentina	8 August 2008
Taiwan	1 October 2008
