= No Promises (Carla Bruni album) =

2007 studio album by Carla Bruni

Studio album by Carla Bruni
- Released: 15 January 2007
- Recorded: 2006
- Genre: Folk; blues; country
- Language: English
- Label: Naïve

Carla Bruni chronology
Quelqu'un m'a dit (2003)	No Promises (2007)	Comme si de rien n'était (2008)

Singles from No Promises
- 1. "Those Dancing Days Are Gone" Released: December 2006; 2. "If You Were Coming in the Fall" Released: February 2006

No Promises is the second album by the Italian-French singer Carla Bruni. It was recorded during 2006 and released in January 2007. While Bruni's début album, Quelqu'un m'a dit, was sung in French; this album was sung in English.

All tracks on the album are adapted by Bruni from poems by 19th- and 20th-century authors.

== Review ==
Professional ratings
Review scores
Source	Rating
AllMusic	2.0/5 stars
The Observer	4/5 stars
PopMatters	(6/10)

AllMusic said: "Carla Bruni's sophomore effort takes a more difficult route and sees her setting canonical works by such poets as Yeats and Emily Dickinson to music, often calamitously" and concludes "It is a brave failure, but a failure nonetheless."

== Track listing ==
All music is composed by Carla Bruni.

No.	Title	Lyrics	Length
1.	"Those Dancing Days Are Gone"	William Butler Yeats	3:40
2.	"Before the World Was Made"	Yeats	3:49
3.	"Lady Weeping at the Crossroads"	Wystan Hugh Auden	3:35
4.	"I Felt My Life with Both My Hands"	Emily Dickinson	2:54
5.	"Promises Like Pie-Crust"	Christina Georgina Rossetti	2:32
6.	"Autumn"	Walter de la Mare	3:24
7.	"If You Were Coming in the Fall"	Dickinson	3:30
8.	"I Went to Heaven"	Dickinson	2:47
9.	"Afternoon"	Dorothy Parker	2:06
10.	"Ballade at Thirty-Five"	Parker	3:02
11.	"At Last the Secret Is Out"	Auden	3:07

iTunes Store and Japanese edition bonus track
No.	Title	Lyrics	Length
12.	"Those Dancing Days Are Gone" (alternate version) (featuring Lou Reed)	Yeats	2:58

== Charts ==
=== Weekly charts ===
Weekly chart performance for No Promises
Chart (2007)	Peak position
Austrian Albums (Ö3 Austria)	11
Belgian Albums (Ultratop Flanders)	2
Belgian Albums (Ultratop Wallonia)	1
Canadian Albums (Nielsen SoundScan)	20
Dutch Albums (Album Top 100)	47
European Albums (Billboard)	1
French Albums (SNEP)	1
German Albums (Offizielle Top 100)	2
Irish Albums (IRMA)	72
Italian Albums (FIMI)	11
Polish Albums (ZPAV)	37
Portuguese Albums (AFP)	6
Scottish Albums (OCC)	83
Spanish Albums (Promusicae)	5
Swedish Albums (Sverigetopplistan)	55
Swiss Albums (Schweizer Hitparade)	1
UK Albums (OCC)	65
UK Independent Albums (OCC)	8

=== Year-end charts ===
Year-end chart performance for No Promises
Chart (2007)	Position
Belgian Albums (Ultratop Flanders)	50
Belgian Albums (Ultratop Wallonia)	37
European Albums (Billboard)	65
French Albums (SNEP)	70
German Albums (Offizielle Top 100)	99
Swiss Albums (Schweizer Hitparade)	41

== Certifications and sales ==
Certifications and sales for No Promises
Region	Certification	Certified units/sales
Belgium (BRMA)	Gold	25,000^{*}
United States	—	6,000
Summaries
Worldwide	—	380,000
^{*} Sales figures based on certification alone.
