= Carla Bruni =

Italian-French musician and model (born 1967)

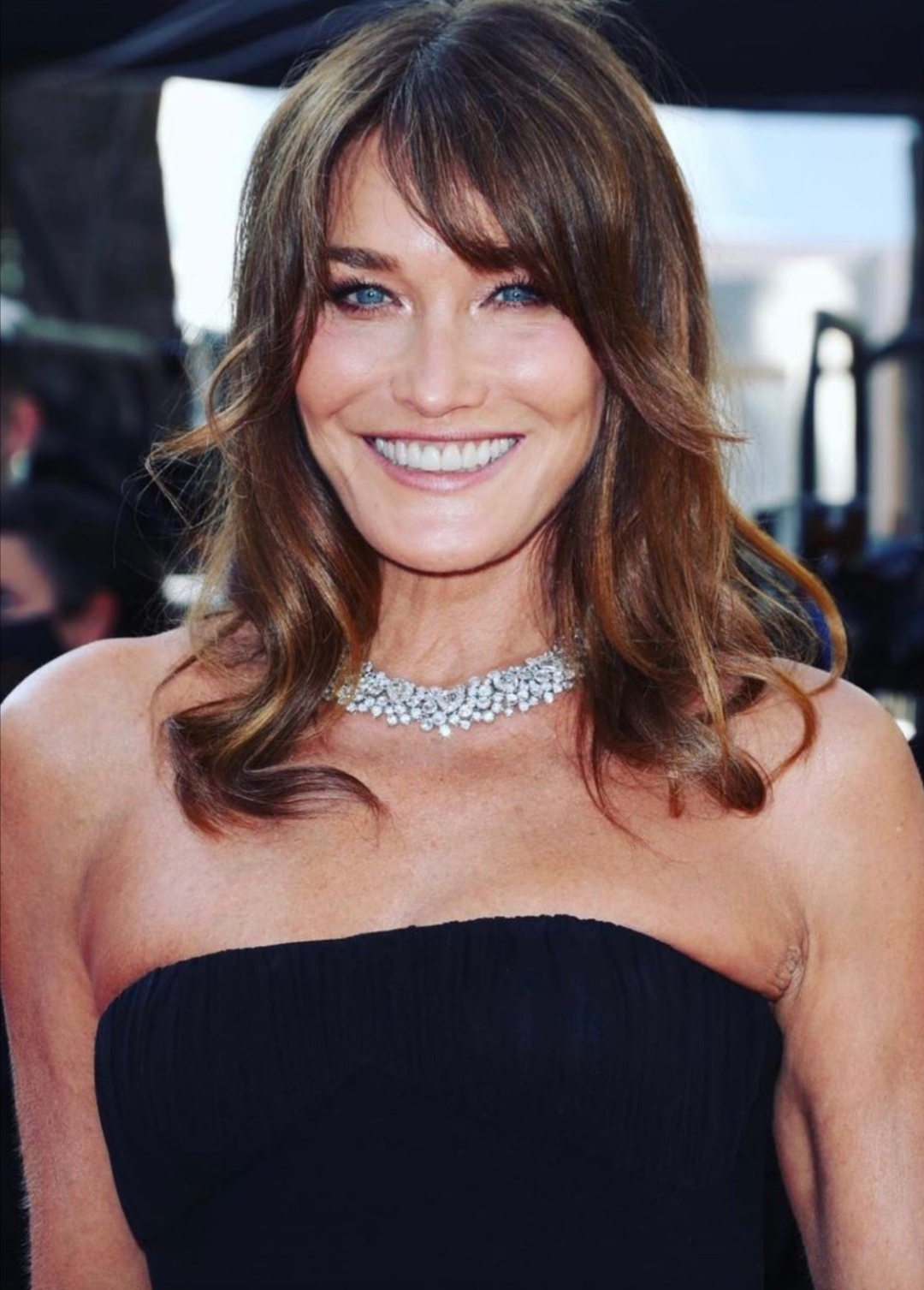
- Bruni in 2021

Spouse of the President of France
- In role 2 February 2008 – 15 May 2012
- President: Nicolas Sarkozy
- Preceded by: Cécilia Sarkozy (2007)
- Succeeded by: Valérie Trierweiler

Personal details
- Born: Carla Gilberta Bruni Tedeschi; 23 December 1967 (age 58) Turin, Italy
- Citizenship: Italy; France (since 2008)
- Spouse: Nicolas Sarkozy (m. 2008)
- Domestic partner: Raphaël Enthoven (2001–2007)
- Children: 2
- Parent(s): Marisa Borini (mother); Alberto Bruni Tedeschi (legal father)
- Relatives: Valeria Bruni Tedeschi (sister)
- Occupation: Singer; songwriter; model; musician
- Musical career
- Genres: Chanson, French music
- Years active: 2002–2008, 2013–present
- Labels: Naïve Records, EMI
- Modeling information
- Height: 1.76 m (5 ft 9 1/2 in)
- Hair color: Brown
- Eye color: Blue
- Agency: Storm Management (London); d' Management (Milan); ZZO (Paris)

Carla Bruni-Sarközy de Nagy-Bocsa (born Carla Gilberta Bruni Tedeschi, pronounced [ˈkarla dʒilˈbɛrta ˈbruːni teˈdeski], 23 December 1967) is an Italian and French singer, songwriter and fashion model who served as the first lady of France from 2008—when she married then president Nicolas Sarkozy—to 2012.

She was born in Italy and moved to France at the age of seven. Bruni was a model from 1987 to 1997 before taking up a career in music. She wrote several songs for Julien Clerc that were featured on his 2000 album, Si j'étais elle. Bruni released her first album, Quelqu'un m'a dit, in 2003, which eventually spent 34 weeks in the top 10 of the French Albums Chart. Bruni won the Victoire Award for Female Artist of the Year at the 2004 Victoires de la Musique. The same year, Bruni released her second album, No Promises, then the following year, she released her third album, Comme si de rien n'était. In 2013, Bruni released her fourth album, Little French Songs. In 2017, Bruni released her fifth album, French Touch. In 2024, she walked in the Victoria's Secret Fashion Show.

== Early life and family ==
Bruni was born in Turin, Italy. She is legally the daughter of Italian concert pianist Marisa Borini and industrialist, classical composer Alberto Bruni Tedeschi. In 2008, however, Bruni told Vanity Fair that her biological father is Maurizio Remmert, a classical guitarist who came from a wealthy family. When Remmert met Marisa Borini at a concert in Turin, he was a 19-year-old classical guitarist, and their affair lasted six years. Her sister is actress and movie director Valeria Bruni Tedeschi. She had a brother, Virginio Bruni Tedeschi (1959 – 4 July 2006), who died from complications of HIV/AIDS. Her (legal) paternal grandparents and her maternal grandfather were Italian, while the last quarter of her ancestry is French. She is second cousin of Alessandra Martines.

Bruni is an heiress to the fortune created by the Italian tyre manufacturing company CEAT, founded in the 1920s by her legal grandfather, Virginio Bruni Tedeschi. The company was sold in the 1970s to Pirelli (the brand continues in its former subsidiary in India, founded in 1958). The family moved to France in 1975, purportedly to escape the threat of kidnapping by the Red Brigades, a Communist terrorist group active in Italy in the 1970s and 1980s. Bruni grew up in Paris and attended the finishing school Château Mont-Choisi in Lausanne, Switzerland. She returned to Paris to study art and architecture, but left at 19 to become a model. Through her biological father, Bruni has a half-sister, Consuelo Remmert.

== Career ==
=== 1987–1996: Early career and modelling ===
Bruni signed with City Models in 1987, aged 19. Paul Marciano, president and creative director of Guess? Inc., came across her picture among composite cards of aspiring models, and chose her to model with Estelle Lefébure in campaigns for Guess? jeans. Bruni subsequently worked for designers and fashion houses such as Christian Dior, Givenchy, Paco Rabanne, Sonia Rykiel, Christian Lacroix, Karl Lagerfeld, John Galliano, Yves Saint-Laurent, Shiatzy Chen, Chanel, and Versace. By the 1990s, Bruni was among the 20 highest-paid fashion models, earning US$7.5 million in her peak year. While modelling, Bruni dated Eric Clapton, then Mick Jagger. On 11 April 2008, a 1993 nude photograph of Bruni taken during her modelling career sold at auction for US$91,000 (€65,093) – more than 60 times the expected price. She was a modeling subject of a 1999 trompe-l'œil wool-knit dress body painting by Joanne Gair that is included in Gair's second book, Body Painting: Masterpieces by Joanne Gair.

=== 1997–2005: Music career and debut album ===
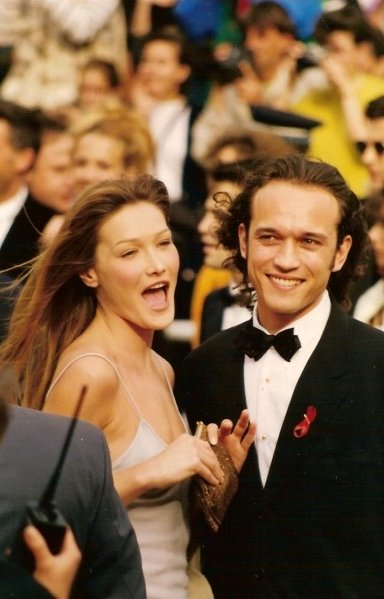
Bruni with actor Vincent Perez at the 1994 Cannes Film Festival

In 1997, Bruni quit the world of fashion to devote herself to music. She sent her lyrics to Julien Clerc in 1999, based on which he composed six tracks on his 2000 album Si j'étais elle.

In 2003, her debut album Quelqu'un m'a dit, produced by Louis Bertignac and released in Europe, was a surprise hit, selling 2 million copies. Three songs from the album appear in Hans Canosa's 2005 American film Conversations with Other Women, the song Le Plus Beau du quartier was used in H&M's Christmas 2006 commercial, and the title track was featured in the 2003 movie Le Divorce and in the 2009 movie (500) Days of Summer. In January 2010, her song "L'amoureuse" was featured in an episode of NBC's Chuck, "Chuck vs. First Class".

In 2005, she wrote the lyrics for 10 out of 12 songs for Louis Bertignac's new album Longtemps, and performed two duets with him on the album, Les Frôleuses and Sans toi.

=== 2006–2008: No Promises and Comme si de rien n'était ===
She continued recording after her marriage. She released her third album Comme si de rien n'était on 11 July 2008. The songs are self-penned except for one rendition of "You Belong to Me" and another song featuring Michel Houellebecq's poem La Possibilité d'une île set to music. Royalties from the album will be donated to unidentified charitable and humanitarian causes.

=== 2009–present: Little French Songs, return to modelling, and other projects ===
Bruni sang for Nelson Mandela's 91st birthday on 18 July 2009 at Radio City Music Hall in New York City.

In September 2009, she recorded a duet with Harry Connick Jr. for the French edition of his album Your Songs. They sang The Beatles' song "And I Love Her". The album was released in France on 26 October 2009.

Following months of speculation, in a television interview broadcast on 23 November 2009, Bruni revealed that she had accepted a role in a forthcoming Woody Allen film. She admitted her reasoning for embarking on the Paris production; "I'm not an actress at all. Perhaps I'll be completely hopeless, but I can't miss an opportunity like this one. When I'm a grandmother I'd like to be able to say I made a film with Woody Allen."

In September 2010, she contributed a cover of David Bowie's "Absolute Beginners" for the War Child charity record We Were So Turned On: A Tribute to David Bowie (Manimal Vinyl). They also released the track as a split 7-inch vinyl split with UK legends, Duran Duran.

Italian singer/songwriter Simone Cristicchi's entry in the 2010 San Remo Italian Song Festival was the song "Meno Male", with the chorus lyrics of "Meno male che c'è Carla Bruni" ("Thank goodness for Carla Bruni"). The song appears to mock Bruni and her husband, but Cristicchi stated in an interview for Italian television weekly TV Sorrisi e Canzoni "I use sarcasm to explain our Italian way of always wanting to follow any type of gossip without being interested in real problems." Bruni was to be a guest singer at the 2010 San Remo festival, but withdrew from participating.

In May 2014, Bruni performed at the Habima Theatre in TelAviv as part of her international tour for Little French Songs.Ahead of the concert, she described Israel as "full of life", adding that she had previously visited twice, once as a model and once with her husband, Nicolas Sarkozy, during a state visit. Following the concert, she told the audience in Hebrew, "TelAviv, I love you," and expressed a wish to return to sing again.

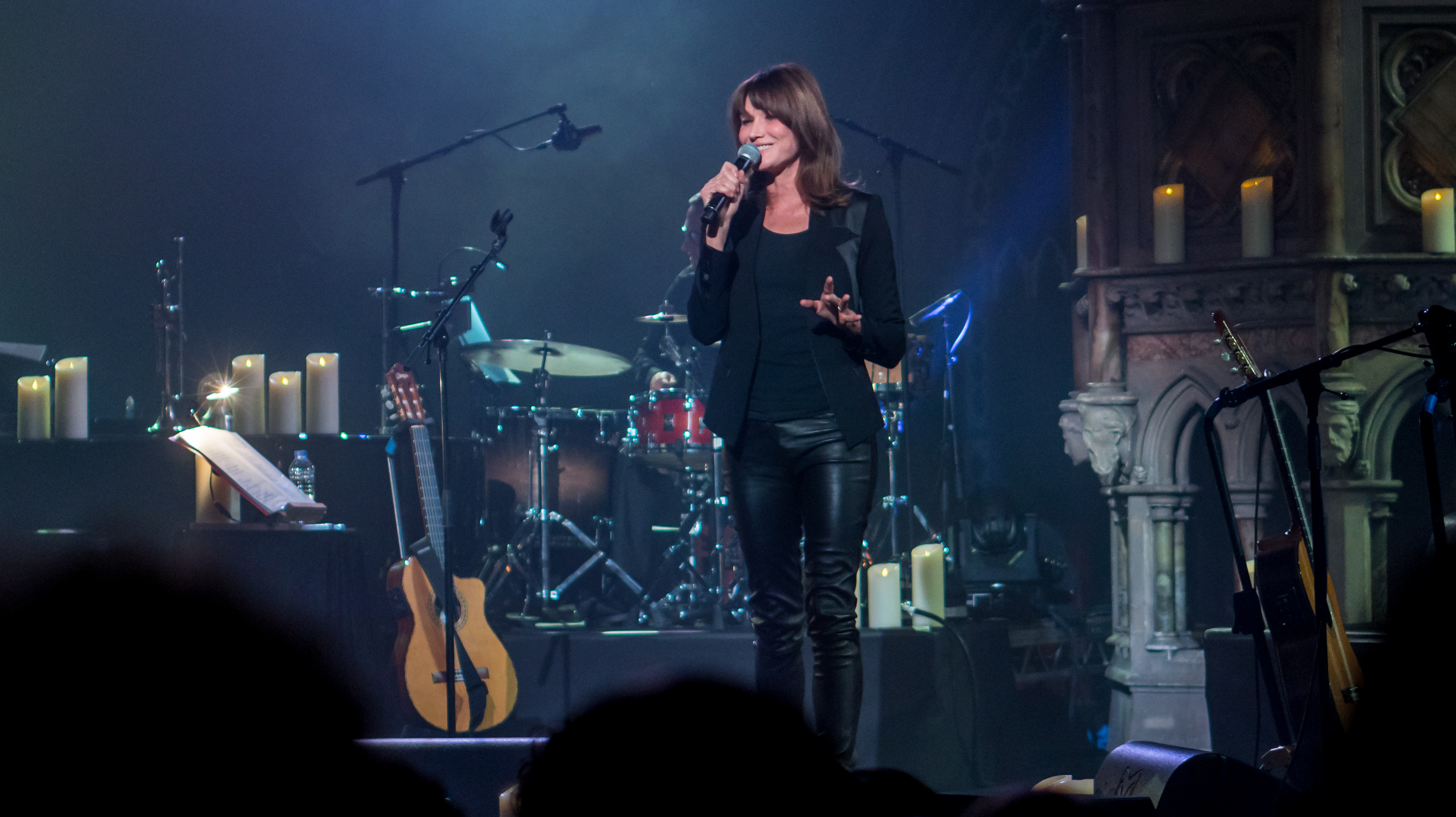
Bruni performing in December 2017

In September 2017, Bruni, along with models Claudia Schiffer, Naomi Campbell, Helena Christensen, and Cindy Crawford, closed the Versace spring/summer 2018 fashion show, which was an homage to the late Gianni Versace.

Bruni presented two three-part music series on BBC Radio 2: Postcards from Paris in 2014 and C'est La Vie in 2018.

Bruni is considered a fashion industry "legend", according to models.com.

In October 2024, Bruni returned to the runway to walk in the first Victoria's Secret Fashion Show to take place in six years.

=== First Lady of France ===
Following Bruni's marriage to President Nicolas Sarkozy on 2 February 2008, she moved into the Élysée Palace for the remainder of Sarkozy's five-year term. Bruni was given an office in the east wing of the palace, which was known as "Madame's wing", and was assigned a private secretary.

Although constitutionally, Bruni had no official role within the government, she assisted her husband with a number of official obligations. She also accompanied Sarkozy on state visits, most notably to the United Kingdom, where her presence led to the visit being widely publicized. Bruni also accompanied Sarkozy on a state visit to meet the Dalai Lama in August 2008.

Bruni has represented The Global Fund to Fight AIDS, Tuberculosis and Malaria numerous times as an ambassador and has visited Burkina Faso and Benin while representing the organisation.

In 2010, Forbes magazine ranked Bruni as the 35th-most powerful woman in the world.

== Personal life ==
=== Political views ===
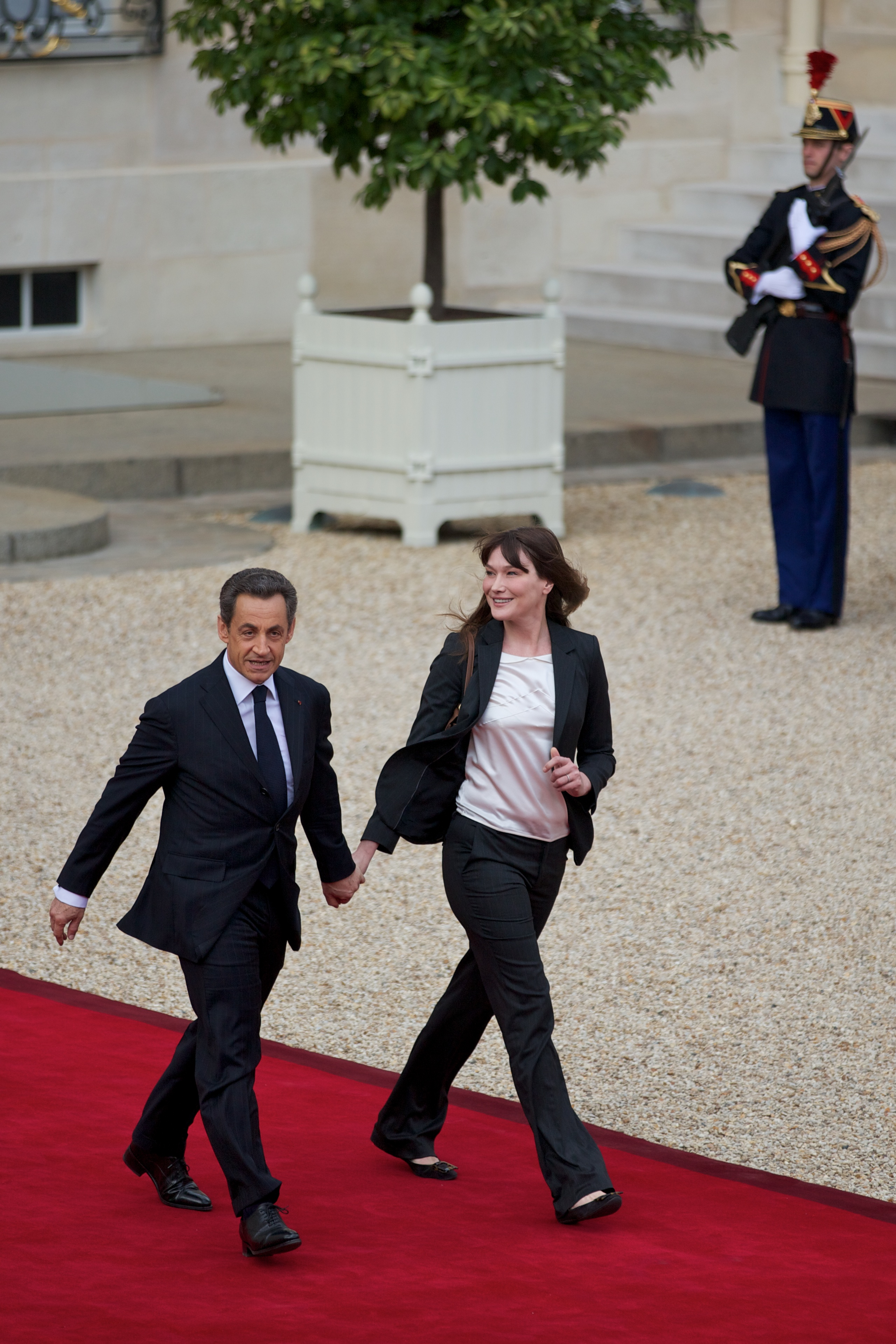
Nicolas Sarkozy and Carla Bruni leaving the Elysee Palace, 15 May 2012

During the 2007 French presidential election, Bruni stated that she would have voted for Ségolène Royal, who was running against her future husband, Nicolas Sarkozy. Bruni said her lack of French citizenship disallowed her from voting, but she would have voted left-wing due to it being a family tradition. In an October 2011 interview with the Scottish newspaper The Sunday Herald, Bruni said, "My family have always voted to the left. It's tradition. I'll never vote right wing."

In an interview with Le Point, Bruni said, when asked about her political leanings, "I am left wing, but I'm not against my husband or his party. I am not an activist." In a May 2011 interview with Le Parisien, Bruni said she no longer felt left-wing and identified as an ultra-Sarkozyist.

In a 2012 Vogue magazine interview, Bruni stated, "My generation doesn't need feminism ... I'm not at all an active feminist. On the contrary, I'm bourgeois." However, on 16 November 2020, she told BBC Radio 5 Live: "Of course I'm a feminist, like every woman is" and "My husband is very much a feminist man." She also said that she was "not at all a political person."

In 2012, she stated that she supports same-sex marriage and same-sex adoption.

=== Relationship with the Enthovens ===
In 2001, Bruni had her first child, son Aurélien, with philosophy professor Raphaël Enthoven. Bruni has been described as having been the mistress of Enthoven's father, journalist Jean-Paul Enthoven, when she began her relationship with the younger Enthoven, who was at the time married to novelist Justine Lévy; Bruni claims that she only went out with Jean-Paul Enthoven a few times and was never his lover, and that Raphaël Enthoven was already divorcing his wife when she encountered him months after last seeing Jean-Paul.

The song "Raphaël" from Bruni's album Quelqu'un m'a dit is about her relationship with Raphaël Enthoven, and Justine Lévy's 2004 book Rien de Grave (published in English in 2005 as Nothing Serious) is about the end of her marriage; a character named "Paula" represents Bruni. Bruni told Vanity Fair that Raphaël Enthoven ended their relationship in May 2007 because he felt they had become "like friends", and that they remained on good terms.

=== Marriage to Sarkozy ===
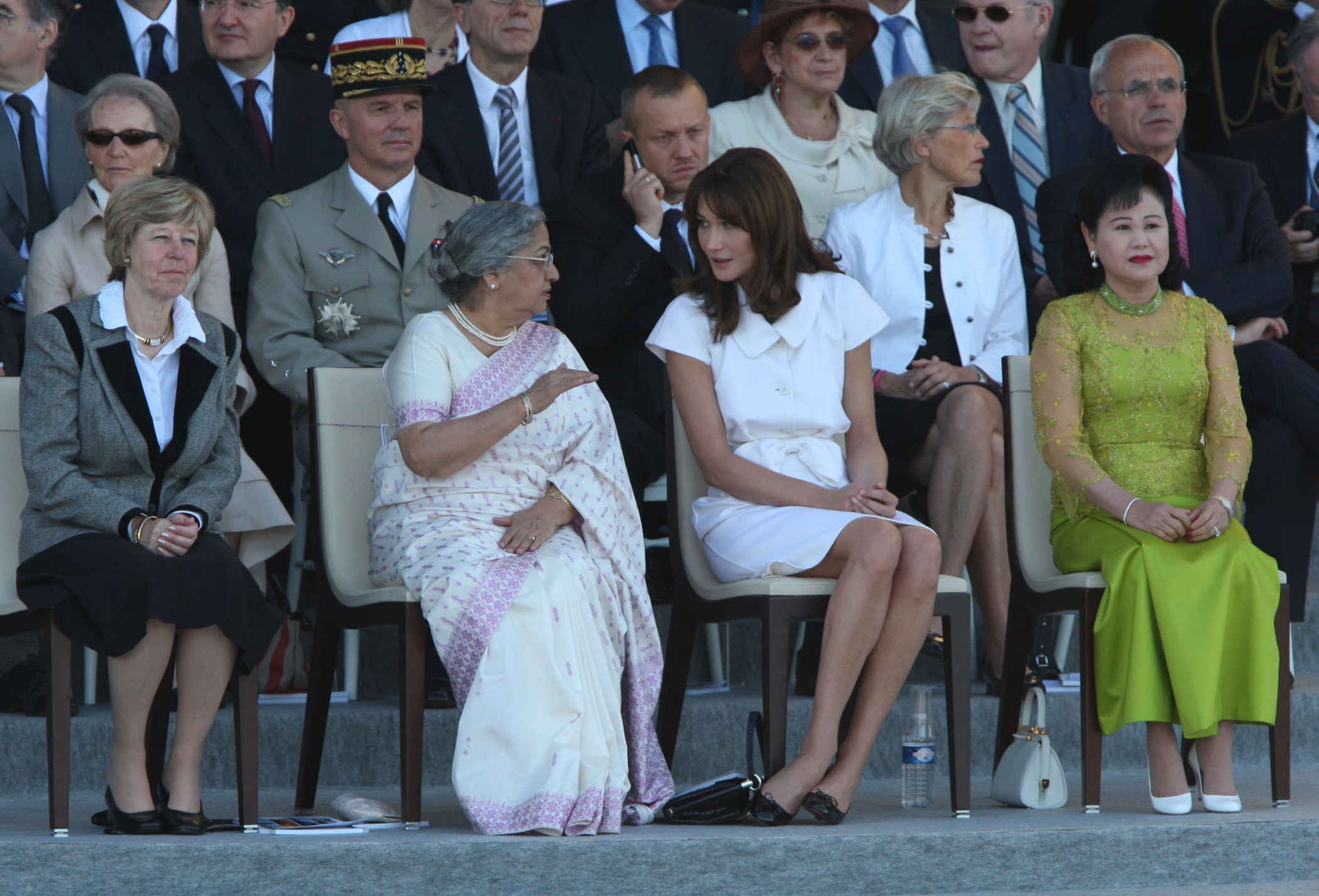
Carla Bruni with Gursharan Kaur, 14 July 2009

Bruni met the recently divorced French president Nicolas Sarkozy in November 2007 at a dinner party. After a brief romance, they married on 2 February 2008 at the Élysée Palace in Paris. The marriage is Bruni's first and Sarkozy's third. Bruni acquired French nationality by naturalization on 10 December 2008. She has since made contradictory statements as to whether she still holds Italian nationality, as well. On 28 April 2014 episode of the Ellen DeGeneres Show, she confirmed that she still holds Italian citizenship.

Following her marriage to Sarkozy, in February 2008, Bruni continued accompanying him on state visits, including to the United Kingdom in March 2008, which created a sensation in the international press and among the public in both Britain and France. As First Lady, she had an office and staff at her disposal in the East wing of the Élysée Palace.

Controversy arose on the eve of the state visit to the UK, with the publication by Christie's auction house of a nude photograph of Bruni taken during her career as a model. The photograph sold for $91,000. At the same time there was great interest in Bruni's wardrobe, which was by Christian Dior; this was seen as a diplomatic choice, since Dior is a French design house, but the wardrobe was designed by John Galliano, a British designer working for Dior. Another controversy was the use of a popular photo of the French President and Bruni in the print advertising of Ryanair. The couple was awarded damages of one Euro to Sarkozy and 60,000 Euros to Bruni by a French court due to the mocking nature of the advertisement which ran the tagline "With Ryanair, my whole family can come to my wedding." above Bruni's head.

In December 2008, Bruni sued the makers of a bag featuring a nude shot taken during her youth. Clothes designer Pardon produced 10,000 of the shopping bags emblazoned with the nude photo taken in 1993, showing Bruni staring at the camera with her crossed hands covering her crotch.

On 19 October 2011, Bruni gave birth to a daughter, Giulia, in the Clinique de la Muette, in Paris.

=== Witness tampering ===
On 9 July 2024, Bruni-Sarkozy was put on bail after being charged with having put pressure on a witness who accused ex-president Nicolas Sarkozy of having received illegal campaign financing from Libyan dictator Colonel Muammar Gaddafi.

In connection with the ongoing investigation into witness tampering, authorities have highlighted Carla Bruni-Sarkozy’s alleged role in facilitating communications aimed at persuading Ziad Takieddine to withdraw his statements regarding illegal campaign financing. Investigators reported that Bruni-Sarkozy was involved in discussions about coordinating these efforts and that her communications were scrutinized for evidence of coercion or undue influence. As a result, she is now under judicial supervision, which includes restrictions on contacting certain individuals involved in the case.

She was suspected of being involved in bribing Lebanese judicial personnel.

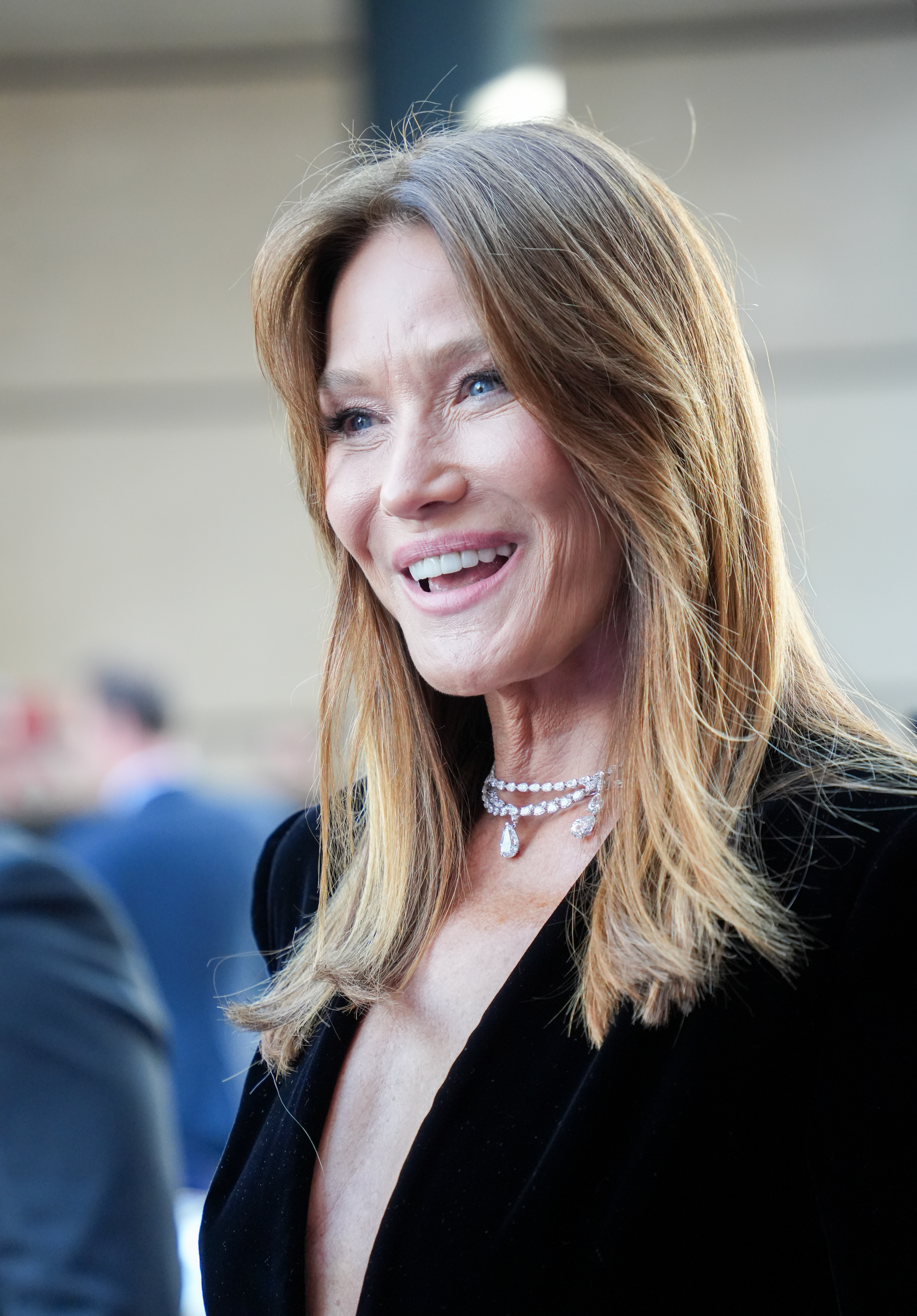
Bruni at the 2026 Cannes Film Festival

== Discography ==
=== Studio albums ===
- 2003: Quelqu'un m'a dit
- 2007: No Promises
- 2008: Comme si de rien n'était
- 2013: Little French Songs
- 2017: French Touch
- 2020: Carla Bruni

== Filmography ==
Year	Film	Role	Notes
1994	Prêt-à-Porter	Herself	Uncredited
1998	Paparazzi	Herself	
2009	Somebody Told Me About. . . Carla Bruni	Herself	80-minute documentary film
2011	Midnight in Paris	Museum guide	Directed by Woody Allen; Nominated—Alliance of Women Film Journalists Award for Best Ensemble Cast; Nominated—Phoenix Film Critics Society Award for Best Ensemble Acting; Nominated—San Diego Film Critics Society Award for Best Performance by an Ensemble; Nominated—Screen Actors Guild Award for Outstanding Performance by a Cast in a Motion Picture

== Honours ==
- France:
  - Knight of the Ordre des Arts et des Lettres, 2003

=== Foreign honours ===
- Benin:
  - Grand Cross of the National Order of Benin (2010)
- Spain:
  - Grand Cross of the Order of Charles III (2009)

Unofficial roles
Vacant Title last held by Cécilia Sarkozy	Spouse of the President of France; 2008–2012	Succeeded by Valérie Trierweiler as Partner of the President
