= Raphaël Enthoven =

French philosophy teacher, radio host and television host

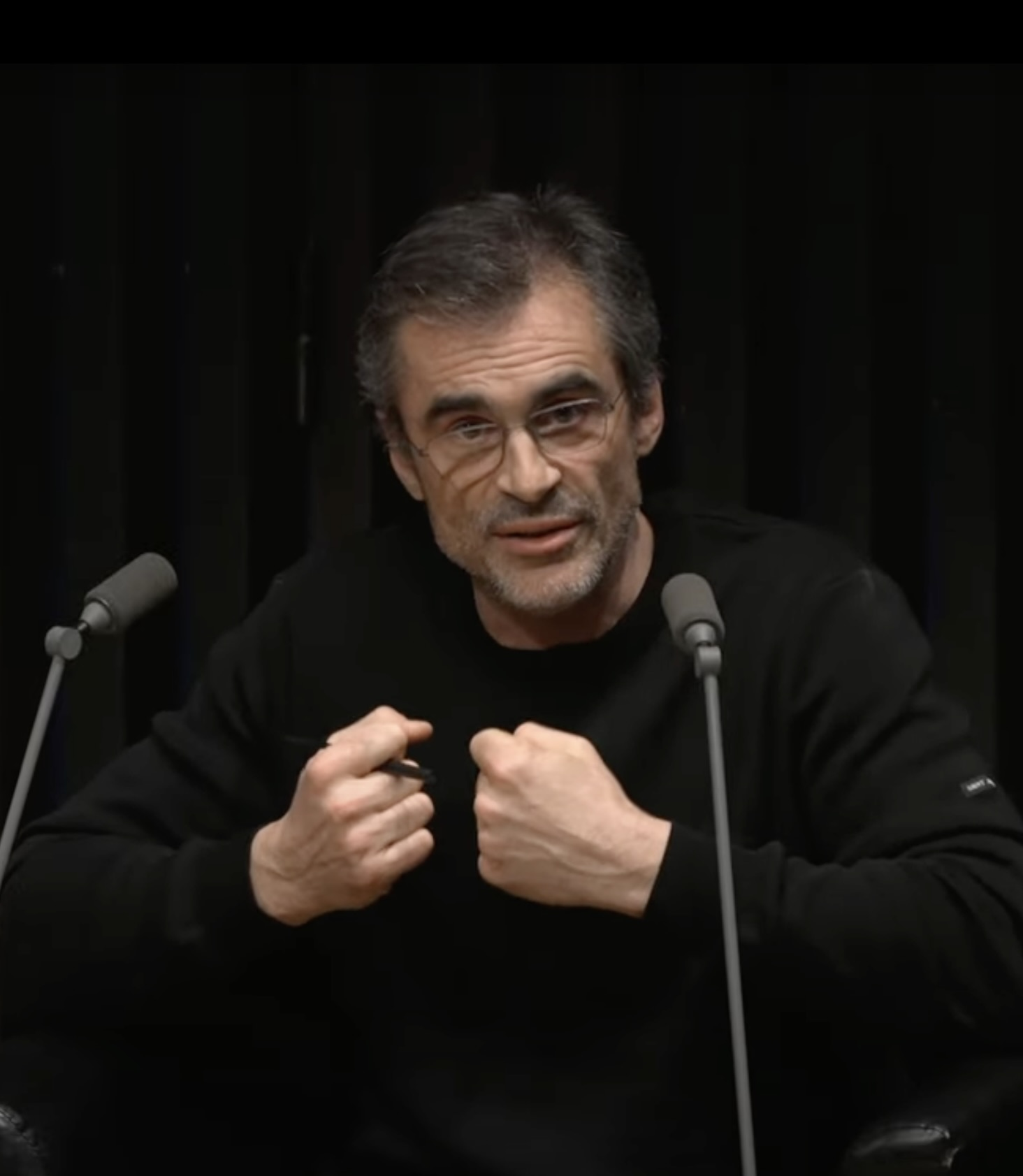
- Enthoven in 2024
- Born: 9 November 1975 (age 50); Paris, France
- Education: Lycée Henri-IV; École normale supérieure
- Spouse: Justine Lévy (m. 1996; div. 2001)
- Partner(s): Carla Bruni (2001–2007); Chloé Lambert (2007–2012); Maud Fontenoy (2014–2015); Adèle Van Reeth (since 2015)
- Children: 5
- Parent(s): Jean-Paul Enthoven; Catherine David
- Relatives: Bernard-Henri Lévy (former father-in-law)

Raphaël Enthoven (French pronunciation: [ʁafaɛl ɛntovɛn], [ɑ̃tovɛn]; born 9 November 1975) is a French philosophy teacher, radio host and television host. An agrégé who taught at Jean Moulin University Lyon 3 and Paris Diderot University, Enthoven is known to the French public for hosting various philosophy-related shows on radio and television. Although he has been described as a philosopher, Enthoven himself rejects being labelled as such.

== Career ==
After obtaining the qualification in philosophy from École Normale Supérieure, he taught for two years at the Jean Moulin University Lyon 3, then at Paris Diderot University, and during the first two years (2002 and 2003) at the Université populaire de Caen, founded by Michel Onfray, where he runs the general philosophy seminar. After distancing himself from the latter, he became co-producer of the radio show Les vendredis de la philosophie on France Culture. Having previously lectured political philosophy at Sciences Po (2000–2003, 2005–2007), and at the École Polytechnique (2007–2010), he also taught on Spinoza, Bergson and Clément Rosset on Les mardis de la philo and the Bibliothèque nationale de France on the meaning of life. Since 2013, he also teaches philosophy to first and second-year high-school students at the École Jeannine Manuel, a private bilingual high school.

He is the adviser to the editor of Philosophie Magazine, where he holds the "Meaning and life", it is still in production at France Culture. Having dealt with the Appointment Policy, in partnership with the magazine L'Express, he has become an everyday icon in the new program schedule for France Culture in 2008–2009 by bringing to life the show The new paths of knowledge Monday to Friday at 17h.

Since October 2008, he has produced the show Philosophy broadcast on Sunday at 1 pm on Arte. He read Marcel Proust in Les Intermittences du cœur and Albertine endormie, with Karol Beffa as pianist.

A fictionalised version of Enthoven appears under the name Taillevent in the 2024 satirical novel Les derniers jours du Parti socialiste by Aurélien Bellanger.

== Personal life ==
Enthoven was born in Paris and comes from a French Jewish family. His paternal grandfather is from Mascara, near Oran, in Algeria. He is the son of journalist Catherine David and publisher Jean-Paul Enthoven. In 1996, he married writer Justine Lévy, daughter of philosopher Bernard-Henri Lévy, himself a friend of Enthoven's father. In 2000, Enthoven began an affair with singer Carla Bruni while she was the mistress of his father, which eventually prompted divorce from Lévy in 2001. Justine Lévy wrote a fictionalized version of the story in her book Nothing Serious. In 2020, Enthoven himself penned a fictionalized account of their marriage titled with the Proustian title Le Temps Gagne.

In June 2001, Enthoven had a son named Aurélien with Carla Bruni. In 2007, he separated from Bruni and began a relationship with actress Chloé Lambert, who gave birth to their son in 2008. They are said to have separated around 2012. In October 2014, he had a son with sailor and politician Maud Fontenoy. As of 2016, he had four children. He had two children with Adèle Van Reeth, Zadig, born in 2016, and Marcel, born in 2021.

On Wednesday 29 November 2023, Rokhaya Diallo published an editorial with the British publication, The Guardian, in which she discussed Enthoven's alleged harassment of her via X, and the ensuing defamation lawsuit he brought against Diallo. The judge cleared Diallo of all charges, citing that her reproach for his "malign obsession" with her was not a criminal offence.

== Bibliography ==
- Un jeu d'enfant : la philosophie, Paris, Fayard, 2007; Pocket, 2008.
- L'Endroit du décor, Paris, Gallimard, 2009.
- L'absurde, Paris : Fayard, 2010.
- Lectures de Proust, Paris, Bayard, 2013.
- Matière Première, Paris, Gallimard, 2013.
- Le Temps gagné, Paris, Éditions de l'Observatoire, 2020.
