= Conversations with Other Women =

- Theatrical release poster
- Directed by: Hans Canosa
- Written by: Gabrielle Zevin
- Produced by: Ram Bergman; Bill McCutchen; Kerry Barden; Kwesi Collisson
- Starring: Helena Bonham Carter; Aaron Eckhart; Nora Zehetner; Olivia Wilde
- Cinematography: Steve Yedlin
- Edited by: Hans Canosa
- Music by: Starr Parodi; Jeff Eden Fair
- Release dates: September 2, 2005 (Telluride Film Festival); August 11, 2006 (United States)
- Running time: 84 minutes
- Country: United States
- Box office: $973,525

Conversations with Other Women is a 2005 romantic drama film written by Gabrielle Zevin, starring Aaron Eckhart and Helena Bonham Carter, and directed by Hans Canosa, notable for its splitscreen presentation in which both of its lead actors are on-screen for nearly the film's entire runtime. Bonham Carter won Best Actress for her performance at the 2005 Tokyo International Film Festival.

== Plot ==
At a wedding reception in New York, a man in his late thirties (Eckhart) approaches a bridesmaid (Bonham Carter) of about the same age, and offers her a glass of champagne. As conversation ensues, they begin to flirt. Witty small talk about such topics as the wedding party and their own past relationships gradually reveals to the viewing film audience that they are not strangers, but in fact were previously husband and wife. A series of flashback scenes shows much younger versions of the two of them together at the start of their relationship.

Despite both having significant others (22-year-old Sarah the dancer and Geoffrey the cardiologist, respectively, both absent), the couple go upstairs to her hotel room together. However, their decision to sleep together is one which is clearly complex and fraught with emotional baggage for each of them. Again with flashbacks, a series of vignettes juxtaposes their earlier selves against the older, perhaps wiser, couple in the hotel room.

The two reminisce and reassess their feelings for each other. He appears to have ambiguous feelings about the direction of his life, while she seems more adjusted to her life choices. The emotional fulfillment the two experienced in their youth has the appearance of causing them to reflect on their current lives in comparison to the choices and options they had while much younger.

She must catch a transatlantic flight home to London in the morning, so the two leave the hotel in the early morning. As they return to their separate lives, each speculates with their cab driver on the future and the difficulty of being happy.

== Cast ==
- Helena Bonham Carter as Woman
- Aaron Eckhart as Man
- Nora Zehetner as Young Woman
- Olivia Wilde as Bridesmaid
- Thomas Lennon as Videographer
- Brian Geraghty as Groom
- Brianna Brown as Bride

== Release information ==
=== Theatrical release ===
Conversations, Canosa's directorial debut, premiered at the 2005 Telluride Film Festival. The film subsequently played at the Tokyo International Film Festival, Seminci Valladolid International Film Festival, the US Comedy Arts Festival, South by Southwest Film Festival, Seattle International Film Festival, Los Angeles Film Festival, Rio de Janeiro International Film Festival, Hamburg Film Festival, São Paulo International Film Festival, and the Muestra Internacional de Cine.

The film's international theatrical premiere was on June 7, 2006 in France. Released by distributor MK2 Diffusion under the title Conversations avec une Femme, the film played theatrically for five months to both box office success and critical acclaim.

Released on August 11, 2006 in the United States by Fabrication Films, the film played in fourteen cities, garnering modest theatrical box office and critical acclaim.

=== DVD release ===
The original split-screen Region 1 DVD version was released in the United States on January 9, 2007 by Arts Alliance America. A single frame, full screen DVD version, created for 4x3 broadcast television release, was subsequently released on October 9, 2007. The single frame cut only retains three split-screen sequences: the opening titles, the sex scene, and the closing taxicab sequence.

International DVD releases include MK2 in France, Shochiku in Japan, Revelation Films in the United Kingdom, TVA Films in Canada, Dendy Films in Australia, Filmes Unimundos in Portugal, D Productions in Turkey, Civite Films in Spain, Global in Russia, J-Bics in Thailand, Paradiso Home Entertainment in Belgium, Luxembourg and the Netherlands, Cathay-Keris Films in Singapore and Malaysia, Atlantic Film in Sweden, NoShame Films in Italy, Prooptiki Bulgaria in Bulgaria, Croatia, Romania, Serbia and Montenegro and Slovenia, Prooptiki in Greece, Shapira Films in Israel, Solopan in Poland, VideoFilmes in Brazil, and With Cinema in South Korea.

=== Critical reception ===
Conversations with Other Women received positive reviews from critics. On Rotten Tomatoes, the film has a rating of 74%, based on 62 reviews, with an average rating of 6.5/10. The site's critical consensus reads, "Its occasional use of split screen may feel gimmicky at times, but Conversations With Other Women is a bold, inventive drama carried by its two charismatic leads." On Metacritic, the film holds a score of 62 out of 100, based on 20 reviews, indicating "generally favorable" reviews.

Film critic David Thomson found fault with Conversations with Other Women use of split screen, contending that the device detracted from the movie's focus; if Canosa and Zevin had "excise[d] the last remaining split-screen stuff, they’d have a film with a kind of modest, forlorn greatness." Roger Ebert, rather, found the split-screen apt and gave the film 3.5 stars out of 4, writing "it’s a daring and tantalizing formal experiment ... Sometimes the two adjacent frames show the same thing from slightly different angles, usually with the Man on one side and the Woman on the other. But the divided screen also allows the filmmakers to comment instantaneously on the action in ways that recall the scene in Annie Hall where the subtitles translate the real thoughts behind the words the characters are speaking."

== Awards ==
Result	Award	Recipient	Festival/Ceremony	Year
Won	Special Jury Prize	Hans Canosa	Tokyo International Film Festival	2005
Won	Best Actress	Helena Bonham Carter	Tokyo International Film Festival	2005
Nominated	Tokyo Grand Prix		Tokyo International Film Festival	2005
Won	Best Actress	Helena Bonham Carter	Evening Standard British Film Awards	2007
Nominated	Producers Award (also for Brick)	Ram Bergman	Independent Spirit Awards	2005
Nominated	Best First Screenplay Award	Gabrielle Zevin	Independent Spirit Awards	2006
Nominated	Golden Spike		Seminci Valladolid International Film Festival	2005

== Production ==
Eckhart and Bonham Carter shot 82 pages of dialogue in only 12 days of principal photography.

To facilitate the split screen presentation of the film, two cameras (one on each actor) were used throughout principal photography.

For the sex scene, the director asked the actors to stay in the bed while the crew quickly changed camera positions to get all of the coverage. The entire scene, including 10 camera setups and a complex dolly shot, was completed in 45 minutes.

To facilitate a sense of realism, both actors provided elements of their own costumes. Eckhart wore his own Armani suit and Calvin Klein underwear as part of his costume, while Bonham Carter wore her own Prada shoes.

The hotel room, the interior of the elevator and the interior of the cab(s) in the final shot were shot on a sound stage in Culver City, California.

The hotel ballroom scenes were shot in the ballroom of the Park Plaza Hotel, adjacent to MacArthur Park near downtown Los Angeles, California. Other films shot at that location include Barton Fink, Chaplin, Nixon, The Fisher King, Wild at Heart and Bugsy.

Many scenes were shot in the Los Angeles Herald-Examiner building, which has been used almost exclusively as a film location since the notorious Los Angeles newspaper, once owned by William Randolph Hearst, closed down in 1989.

== Post-production ==
Though an editor was initially hired to cut the movie, he quit after putting together an initial assembly, citing difficulties editing the dual-frame split screen presentation in which the movie is presented. The director, who had never cut a film before, elected to learn and use the editing software himself, and acted as editor.

The final shot in the movie was the only one captured with a single camera. Eckhart and Bonham Carter were filmed in the back of one taxi on set. In post production, the shot was digitally divided in two; digital movement was added for each car and two separate background plates were composited to create the illusion of different taxi interiors.

The film contains 117 visual effects shots, all of which are designed to be "invisible". When producer Kwesi Collision solicited bids from VFX houses, he received an initial estimated VFX budget of over $1 million, followed by a $400,000 "low budget" estimate. Collision decided to execute all of the effects himself, spending four months using Adobe After Effects and Shake to complete the necessary shots.

Three apparent B-roll shots of the supporting characters in a ballroom full of dancers were actually created using visual effects. When the line producer asked the director the minimum number of extras needed for these shots during principal photography, the director requested 50 extras. When only seven extras showed up on the ballroom shoot days, an alternate solution became necessary. The visual effects supervisor found takes which included empty sections of the ballroom. Taking several high resolution stills from those takes, he created three background plates. During a day of additional photography, both the supporting characters who would appear in the foreground and pairs of dancers who would appear in the middle ground were shot against a greenscreen. The visual effects supervisor then composited up to a dozen elements to create shots which appear to contain the bride, her bridesmaids and the young man and young woman characters in the midst of a ballroom full of dancing couples.

A potential continuity error was fixed with visual effects. Due to the short shooting schedule and lack of control of the sound stage, the soles of the actors' bare feet became soiled while shooting on the hotel room set. Shots captured included views of the actors' dirty feet as they got into and out of a clean bed, which would be unlikely in a carpeted hotel room, an error that was not caught by the script supervisor on set. During post production, the director/editor discovered that five shots included in the final edit would include dirty soles. In order to address the problem, the visual effects supervisor rotoscoped the bottom of the actors' feet to delineate the parts of the frame that needed to be replaced. Since shooting replacement soles against greenscreen in the precise size and angles necessary to fill the rotoscoped sections would be cost prohibitive, the digital compositor searched the Internet for replacement feet photographs. He discovered that the best and highest resolution images of feet were on foot fetish websites. Thus the replacement feet in those five shots are "pornographic feet".

A single-frame 4:3 version of the movie was produced for television.

== Soundtrack ==
Although the film contains no traditional score, music plays for almost 40 percent of the running time.

Three songs from the 2003 album Quelqu'un m'a dit by Carla Bruni complement the tone of other sequences in the film. The song "J'en connais" accompanies the opening title cards and the juxtaposed narrative images, and then recurs in the final scene through the end credits. The song "Le plus beau du quartier" plays over the scene in which the woman asks the man to help her undress. The song "L'excessive" serves as accompaniment to the transition from the hotel room to the roof.

The sex scene is played to the song "Ripchord" from the 2004 album More Adventurous by the Los Angeles-based rock band Rilo Kiley.

The scenes in the wedding reception are accompanied by "wedding band" music composed by Starr Parodi and Jeff Eden Fair.

== Split screen ==
Conversations with Other Women comes in a long tradition of experiments in split screen. In 1913 Lois Weber employed the technique in the short film Suspense, a one-reel thriller. The visionary French director Abel Gance used the term "Polyvision" to describe his three-camera, three-projector technique for both widening and dividing the screen in his 1927 silent epic, Napoléon. The term "split screen" was coined to describe the many uses of the technique in films of the 1960s. More recent uses of split screen include Mike Figgis' 2000 film Timecode and the Fox TV series 24.

The most common function of split screen is to show simultaneous actions in different places. The classic, and simplest, example of this is showing two sides of a phone conversation, as in the 1959 film Pillow Talk starring Doris Day and Rock Hudson. Another common use of the technique is to show two separate but converging spaces (such as contrasting shots of predator and prey) to create tension or suspense. The filmmaker most associated with the latter use is Brian De Palma.

Conversations' innovation in split screen is the juxtaposition of shot and reverse shot of two actors in the same take, captured with two cameras, for the entire movie. The film represents a new kind of viewing experience that enlists the audience as a perceptual editor. The filmmakers allow the viewer to choose how they watch the film, following either character or both simultaneously. Seeing both characters act and react in real time lets the audience follow the emotional experience of the characters without interruption.

At a panel on acting at the Telluride Film Festival, the actors spoke of the challenge of working in a two-camera system. Unlike traditionally shot and cut films, the actors knew that all moments of a take could end up on screen and thus 'acted through' every take. The actors were constantly 'in the moment'. The resulting film presents the actors' work in the way musicians play in a duet, with action, dialogue and reaction running on both sides of the frame in real time. The movie presents two remarkable achievements in screen acting.

The shot/reverse shot function of split screen comprises most of the running time of the film, but the filmmakers also use split screen for other spatial, temporal and emotional effects. Conversations' split screen sometimes shows flashbacks of the recent or distant past juxtaposed with the present; moments imagined or hoped by the characters juxtaposed with present reality; present experience fractured into more than one emotion for a given line or action, showing an actor performing the same moment in different ways; and present and near future actions juxtaposed to accelerate the narrative in temporal overlap.
