= Train (board game) =

2009 board game

Train is a board game designed by Brenda Romero in 2009. In the game, players are tasked with transporting passengers along a railway before their opponents. At the end of the game, it is revealed that the final station is a Nazi concentration camp, and that the players had been participating in the murder of Jews during the Holocaust.

== Development ==
Romero created Train over the course of nine months, with the game releasing on April 29, 2009, at a Games for Change conference. Train is one of six games in a series she called "The Mechanic is the Message", which are intended to express difficult emotions through game mechanics. After finding that games were successful in explaining the emotional impact of the Atlantic slave trade to her daughter, Romero went on to design Train as a way to explain the Holocaust in a way that was accessible to a child. The main intent of the game was for players to feel complicit.

== Gameplay ==
In Train, players receive instructions from a typewriter to load people, represented by yellow pegs, to different railway stations. The player moves their trains by rolling dice, and they can use cards to slow down their opponents' trains, or accelerate their own. Once the player reaches the final destination, it is revealed to be a concentration camp, such as Auschwitz or Dachau. The game's rules state that "the game is over when it ends", meaning the player can stop once they have reached the camp, or attempt to liberate the prisoners.

== Reception ==
Upon release, Train was met with controversy, and Romero received threats because of the game. Destructoid praised the game's nuance and mechanics, noting that it makes effective use of the board game format: "The Auschwitz revelation is but one aspect of an entire experience designed to make players question the way they follow rules, and how they’ll behave once they understand what’s going on, and how complicit they’re willing to be."

Train is considered one of Brenda Romero's best known works. The game received the Vanguard Award at the 2009 IndieCade Festival of Independent Game Design, a category which was designed specifically so that Train could be awarded it. Train has been displayed at museums in Georgia Tech, and De Anza College.

In March 2023, Romero tweeted that the game Solution in Gabrielle Zevin's novel Tomorrow, and Tomorrow, and Tomorrow was an uncredited appropriation of Train. In Solution, players work in a factory making widgets; they may spend points to learn that the factory belongs to Nazi Germany and that they can stop making the widgets. The fictional designer describes it as "about being complicit". In a Washington Post article regarding these tweets, Todd Doughty, Knopf Doubleday’s senior vice president for publicity and communications, replied:

'Tomorrow, and Tomorrow, and Tomorrow' is a work of fiction and when crafting a novel, every author draws from the world around them. As Gabrielle Zevin publicly stated in a 2022 'Wired' interview, Brenda Romero's undistributed board game, 'Train,' which Zevin has never played but was aware of, served as one point of inspiration among many for the novel, including books, plays, video games, visual art and locales. The entire world, characters and themes of 'Tomorrow, and Tomorrow, and Tomorrow' are solely Zevin's fictional creation and the only games listed in the author's acknowledgments are video games. Again, 'Tomorrow, and Tomorrow, and Tomorrow' is a novel and not an academic or nonfiction text containing indexes, notes, or works cited. Knopf stands behind Gabrielle Zevin and her work.
