= Kimi ga Iru Kara =

Kimi ga Iru Kara may refer to:

- "Kimi ga Iru Kara" (Sayuri Sugawara song)
- "Kimi ga Iru Kara" (Kylee song)
- "Kimi ga Iru Kara", a song by Mikuni Shimokawa
