= Vacancy (song) =

Single by Kylee
- Released: December 3, 2008
- Label: RX-Records
- Songwriters: Kylee, nature living

"Vacancy" is a single by a Japanese American singer Kylee. The title track "Vacancy" is the ending theme song to the anime Xam'd: Lost Memories.

== Release history ==
Release Date		Title	Format	Notes
Year	Month/Day	Title	Format	Notes
2008	July 16	"Xam'd: Lost Memories"	the ending theme to the anime series	$\cdot$ via the PSN in USA $\cdot$ "Vacancy"
2008	September 24	"Xam'd: Lost Memories"	the ending theme to the anime series	$\cdot$ via the PSN in Japan $\cdot$ "Vacancy"
2008	October 17	"Vacancy"	digital single	$\cdot$ only "Vacancy" $\cdot$ in USA
2008	December 3	"Vacancy"	CD single	$\cdot$ coupling "Justice" & "Plan B" $\cdot$ in Japan
2009	April	"Xam'd: Lost Memories"	the ending theme to the several episodes of the TV anime series	$\cdot$ on MBS, CBC, Tokyo MX $\cdot$ "Vacancy"
2009	July 29	"Kylee meets Xam'd: Lost Memories"	EP	$\cdot$ including "Vacancy" $\cdot$ in Japan

== Track listing ==
CD single

No.	Title	Lyrics	Music	Length
1.	"Vacancy"	Kylee	nature living	4:36
2.	"Justice"	Linus of Hollywood	Linus of Hollywood	3:22
3.	"Plan B"	Linus of Hollywood & Jay O'Sea	Linus of Hollywood & Jay O'Sea	3:55

Personnel

"Vacancy"
vocals : Kylee
all other instruments : nature living
vocal direction : Hideki Ninomiya
mix : Eric Westfall

"Justice"
vocals : Kylee
drums : Jeff Bowders
produce : Linus of Hollywood
mix : Dave Trumtio

"Plan B"
vocals : Kylee
drums : Adam Marcello
produce : Linus of Hollywood
mix : Dave Trumtio

== Music video ==
The music video for "Vacancy" was filmed at Kugenuma Seaside Skatepark in Kanagawa on October 6, 2008.
