= Missing / It's You =

2010 album by Kylee

Single by Kylee
- Released: July 7, 2010
- Label: DefSTAR

"Missing / It's You" is a double-A-sided single by a Japanese American singer Kylee. "Missing" is the second opening theme song for the anime Heroman and also featured in the film Memoirs of a Teenage Amnesiac.

== Release history ==
Release Date		Title	Format	Notes
Year	Month/Day	Title	Format	Notes
2010	April 7	'10 「nissen,」 Summer	in the TV commercial	$\cdot$ "It's You" $\cdot$ Nissen is a mail order company
2010	April 14	"It's You"	Truetone	via 着うた(R) site
2010	April 28	"It's You"	digital download	via 着うたフル(R) site
2010	June 14	"Missing"	Music video	It was premiered on MTV Japan
2010	June 23	"Missing"	Truetone	via 着うた(R) site
2010	June 24	Heroman	the 2nd opening song for the TV anime	$\cdot$ "Missing" $\cdot$ on TV Tokyo and related stations
2010	July 7	"Missing / It's You"	$\cdot$ Regular edition: CD single $\cdot$ Limited edition: CD single + bonus DVD	
2011	November 23	17	CD, CD + bonus DVD	including "Missing", "It's You" & more
2012	November 7	"Missing" "It's You"	digital download	via iTunes Store

== Track listing ==
CD single

No.	Title	Lyrics	Music	Arrange	Length
1.	"Missing"	Akiko Watanabe, Kylee	Koh-ichi Fujimoto	CHOKKAKU	4:09
2.	"It's You"	Naohisa Taniguchi, Kylee	Kouta Okuchi	Naohisa Taniguchi	3:26
3.	"Just Go"	Jez Ashurst, Emma Rolan	Jez Ashurst, Emma Rolan	masasucks, Masuo, F.Andrew	3:01
4.	"Missing" (less vocal)		Koh-ichi Fujimoto	CHOKKAKU	4:09
5.	"It's You" (less vocal)		Kouta Okuchi	Naohisa Taniguchi	3:26

Personnel

"Missing"
vocals : Kylee
sound produce & all other instruments : CHOKKAKU
vocal arrangement & direction : Naohisa Taniguchi
mix : Toshihiko Miyoshi

"It's You"
vocals : Kylee
sound produce & all other instruments : Naohisa Taniguchi
vocal arrangement & direction : Naohisa Taniguchi
mix : D.O.I

"Just Go"
vocals : Kylee
guitar : masasucks
bass : Chris Chaney
drums : Scott Garrett
produce : Jeff Turzo
engineering & additional production : Jesse Astin
mix : Sean Beavan

Limited edition bonus DVD

- "Missing" Music Video
- "It's You" Music Video
- behind the scenes
- Heroman Trailer

== Music video ==
The music video for "Missing" was filmed on Kujūkuri Beach in Chiba, Japan.
