= Kunal Nayyar =

British actor (born 1981)

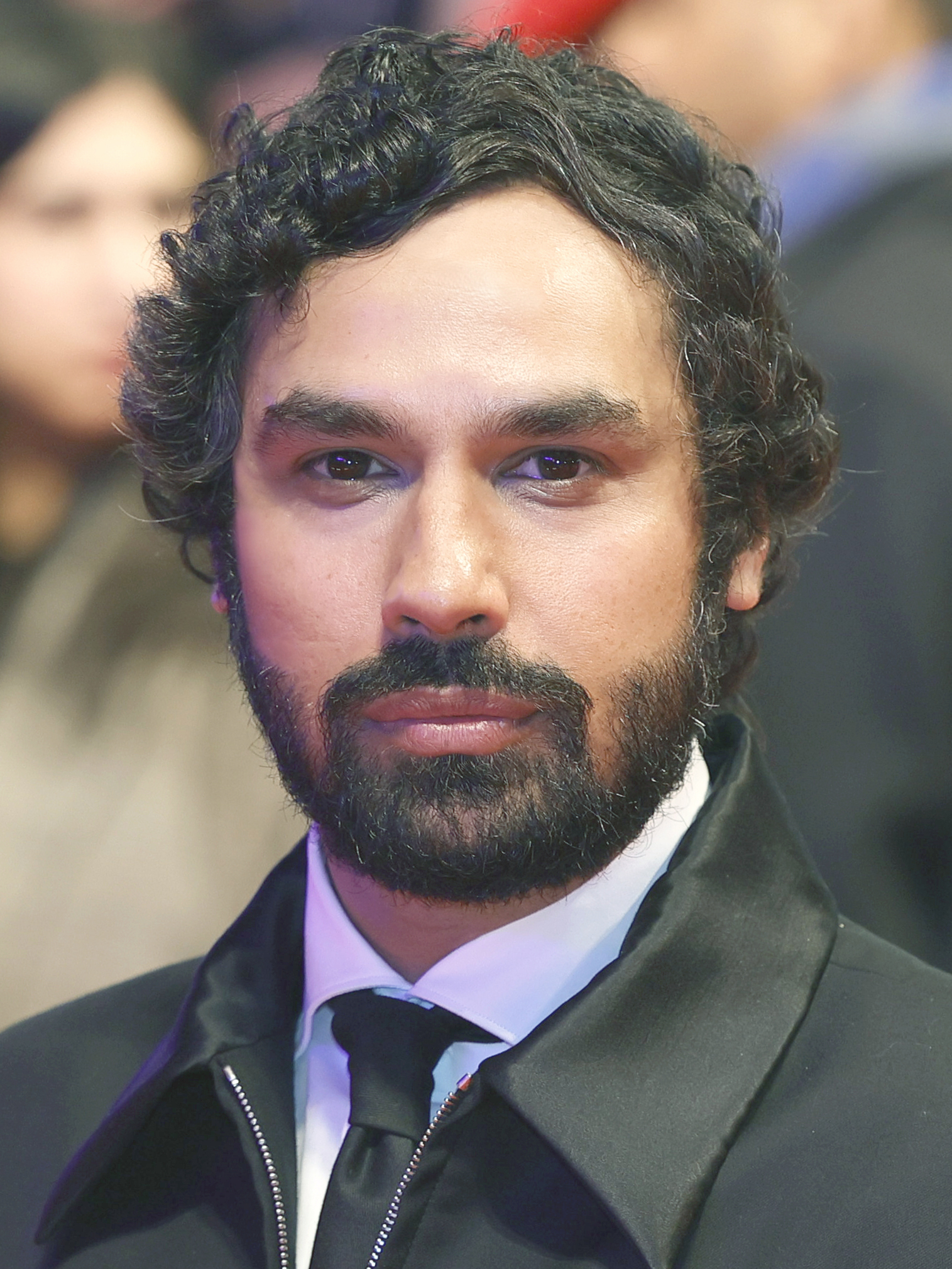
- Nayyar in 2024
- Born: 30 April 1981 (age 45); London, England
- Education: University of Portland (BBA); Temple University (MFA)
- Occupation: Actor
- Years active: 2004–present
- Spouse: Neha Kapur (m. 2011)

Kunal Nayyar (/kʊˈnɑːl ˈnaɪ.ər/, kuu-NAHL NY-ər; born 30 April 1981) is a British actor. He is best known for playing Raj Koothrappali on the CBS sitcom The Big Bang Theory (2007–2019). He also voiced Vijay Patel on the Nickelodeon animated sitcom Sanjay and Craig (2013–2016). Nayyar was nominated for Best Supporting Actor at the 2021 British Academy Television Awards for his role as Sandeep Singh in Netflix anthology series Criminal: UK (2020).

Forbes listed Nayyar as the world's third-highest-paid television actor in 2015 and 2018, with earnings of US$20 million and US$23.5 million, respectively. As of 2024, his net worth is estimated to be $45 million. The asteroid 8627 Kunalnayyar is named after him.

== Early life ==
Kunal Nayyar was born on 30 April 1981. When he was three years old, his family returned to India, and he grew up in New Delhi, where his parents now live. He attended St. Columba's School in Gole Market, where he played badminton for the school team.

In 1999, Nayyar moved to the United States to pursue a Bachelor of Business Administration in Finance at the University of Portland in Oregon. He started taking acting classes and appeared in several school plays while working on his degree.

After participating in the American College Theater Festival at the Kennedy Center in Washington, D.C., Nayyar decided to become an actor. He then attended Temple University in Philadelphia, Pennsylvania, where he received his Master of Fine Arts degree in Acting.

== Career ==
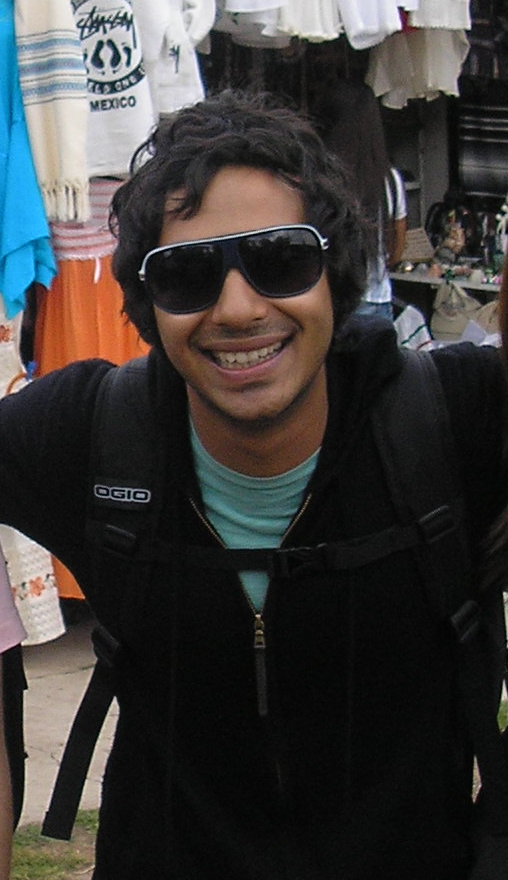
Nayyar on a tour of The Big Bang Theory in 2008

After graduating, Nayyar found work doing American television ads and plays on the London stage. He first gained attention in the US for his role in the West Coast production of Rajiv Joseph's 2006 play Huck & Holden, where he portrayed an Indian exchange student anxious to experience American culture before returning home. In 2006, Nayyar teamed up with Arun Das to write the play Cotton Candy, which premiered in New Delhi to positive reviews.

Nayyar made a guest appearance on the CBS drama NCIS in the season four episode "Suspicion", in which he played Youssef Zidan, an Iraqi terrorist.

In 2007, Nayyar's agent heard about a role as a scientist in an upcoming CBS pilot and encouraged him to audition for the part. This led to his casting in the sitcom The Big Bang Theory, where he played the role of astrophysicist Raj Koothrappali from its premiere in September 2007 to the show's conclusion in May 2019.

In 2011, he co-hosted the Tribute to Nerds show with co-star Simon Helberg at the comedy festival Just for Laughs.

Nayyar voiced Gupta in Ice Age: Continental Drift in 2012. During the same year, he completed the shooting of the film, Dr. Cabbie, produced by Bollywood actor Salman Khan.

In 2013, he produced a documentary called Beyond All Boundaries, which focuses on three individuals and their love for cricket in India: Sudhir bikes across the country to support his team; Prithvi is a young cricket prodigy; and Akshaya is a female cricketer from the Mumbai slums.

From 5 May to 29 June 2015, Nayyar performed in an off-Broadway production, The Spoils, written by and starring actor Jesse Eisenberg. Nayyar played Kalyan, a Nepalese student and roommate of the protagonist Ben, played by Eisenberg. The production transferred to London's West End in 2016.

Nayyar published a book about his career journey, titled Yes, My Accent is Real: and Some Other Things I Haven’t Told You, in September 2015.

He voiced another animated movie character named Guy Diamond in DreamWorks' Trolls, released in November 2016.

In 2020, Nayyar played a convicted serial killer named Sandeep on the Netflix UK production Criminal: UK. He appeared in the final episode of Season 2, which was released in August 2020. In the same year, he joined the cast of the thriller TV series Suspicion on Apple TV+, based on the Israeli thriller TV series False Flag, alongside Uma Thurman, Elizabeth Henstridge and Elyes Gabel.

In 2021, he was announced as having been picked to play the title role of A. J. Fikry in the upcoming comedy-drama The Storied Life of A.J. Fikry, alongside Lucy Hale and Christina Hendricks, an adaptation of the best-selling novel by Gabrielle Zevin.

In 2024, Nayyar reunited with Big Bang Theory costar, Melissa Rauch, making a guest appearance on an episode of Night Court. Night Court is a revival of the '80s NBC sitcom of the same name.

Nayyar portrayed Eshaan Sood, an Indian take on Scrooge in the 2025 film Christmas Karma.

Nayyar's work in philanthropy was largely anonymous before he revealed in an interview in December 2025 that he makes frequent donations to GoFundMe campaigns for funding families' medical bill payments. Nayyar told The i Paper that his charitable contributions to GoFundMe campaigns were his "masked vigilante thing". He has also given significant support to animal welfare charities and student scholarships.

== Personal life ==
In December 2011, Nayyar married Neha Kapur, a model and Femina Miss India 2006. Nayyar lives in Los Angeles with his wife but also maintains residences in London and New Delhi. According to the University of Portland, Nayyar and his wife have given scholarships for University of Portland students in Performing & Fine Arts and paid for guest artists at the university.

== Filmography ==
Key
†	Denotes films that have not yet been released

=== Film ===
Year	Film	Role	Director(s)	Notes
2004	S.C.I.E.N.C.E	Pizza Man	Jordan Noce	
2012	Ice Age: Continental Drift	Gupta	Steve Martino & Mike Thurmeier	Voice
2013	Beyond All Boundaries	Narrator		
2014	The Scribbler	Karim	John Suits	
2014	Dr. Cabbie	Tony	Jean-François Pouliot	
2015	Consumed	Serge Negani	Daryl Wein	
2016	Trolls	Guy Diamond	Mike Mitchell	Voice
2019	Sweetness in the Belly	Dr. Robin Sathi	Zeresenay Berhane Mehari	
2020	Trolls World Tour	Guy Diamond	Walt Dohrn	Voice
2020	Think Like a Dog	Mr. Mills	Gil Junger	
2022	The Storied Life of A.J. Fikry	A.J. Fikry	Hans Canosa	
2023	Trolls Band Together	Guy Diamond	Walt Dohrn	Voice
2024	Spaceman	Peter	Johan Renck	
2024	How to Date Billy Walsh	Rupert Brown	Alex Sanjiv Pillai	
2025	Christmas Karma	Mr Sood	Gurinder Chadha	

=== Television ===
Year	Series	Role	Notes
2007	NCIS	Youssef Zidan	Episode: "Suspicion"
2007–2019	The Big Bang Theory	Raj Koothrappali	Main role
2010	The Late Late Show with Craig Ferguson	Himself	
2013–2016	Sanjay and Craig	Vijay (voice)	Main role
2013–2014	Sullivan & Son	Sanjay/Neal	Episode: "Ladies Night", "Sexual Healing"
2015	The Late Late Show	Host	25–27 February
2015	The Mindy Project	Sendhil	Episode: "While I Was Sleeping"
2016	Ice Age: The Great Egg-Scapade	Gupta (cameo/flashback)	TV special
2017	Trolls Holiday	Guy Diamond (voice)	TV special
2017	Drop the Mic	Himself	Episode: "Mayim Bialik vs. Kunal Nayyar / Ashley Tisdale vs. Nick Lachey"
2020	Criminal: UK	Sandeep Singh	Episode: "Sandeep"
2021	Trolls: Holiday in Harmony	Guy Diamond (voice)	TV special
2022	Suspicion	Aadesh Chopra	Main role
2024	Night Court	Martini Toddwallis	Episode: "A Crime of Fashion"
2026	Stuart Fails to Save the Universe	Rajesh "Raj" Koothrappali	Episodes: "Spoiler: Gary Dies" and "Spoiler: Corn is Delicious"

=== Video games ===
Year	Series	Role	Notes
2012	Ice Age: Continental Drift - Arctic Games	Gupta	

== Theatre ==
Year	Title	Role	Notes
2006	Huck and Holden	Naveen	Dahlia Theater, Los Angeles, United States
2006	Love's Labour's Lost	Other Parts	Royal Shakespeare Company, Stratford upon Avon, United Kingdom
2006	Love's Labour's Lost	Other Parts	Shakespeare Theatre Company, Lansburgh Theatre, Washington, DC, United States
2015	The Spoils	Kalyan	The New Group at The Pershing Square Signature Center, New York, United States
2016	The Spoils	Kalyan	Trafalgar Studios, London

== Awards ==
Year	Award	Category	Title	Result
2006	Garland Awards	Best Male Lead in a Play on the West Coast	Huck and Holden	Won
2011	Screen Actors Guild Awards	Outstanding Performance by an Ensemble in a Comedy Series	The Big Bang Theory	Nominated
2012	Screen Actors Guild Awards	Outstanding Performance by an Ensemble in a Comedy Series	The Big Bang Theory	Nominated
2013	Screen Actors Guild Awards	Outstanding Performance by an Ensemble in a Comedy Series	The Big Bang Theory	Nominated
2014	Screen Actors Guild Awards	Outstanding Performance by an Ensemble in a Comedy Series	The Big Bang Theory	Nominated
2015	Screen Actors Guild Awards	Outstanding Performance by an Ensemble in a Comedy Series	The Big Bang Theory	Nominated
2016	Screen Actors Guild Awards	Outstanding Performance by an Ensemble in a Comedy Series	The Big Bang Theory	Nominated
2017	Screen Actors Guild Awards	Outstanding Performance by an Ensemble in a Comedy Series	The Big Bang Theory	Nominated
2021	British Academy Television Awards	Best Supporting Actor	Criminal: UK	Nominated
