= Mirai (song) =

Single by Kylee
- Released: June 13, 2013
- Label: DefSTAR
- Songwriters: Hanano Tanaka, Naohisa Taniguchi

"Mirai" (未来) is a single by a Japanese American singer Kylee. The title track is the theme song for the film Signal: Luca on Mondays.

== Release history ==
Release Date		Title	Format	Notes
Year	Month/Day	Title	Format	Notes
2012	the first ten days of April	"Feel"	music video	
2012	April 18	イカさまタコさま	the ending theme to the TV program	$\cdot$ "Feel" $\cdot$ on TBS and related stations
2012	April 25	"Feel"	$\cdot$ Truetone $\cdot$ digital download	$\cdot$ via 着うた(R) site $\cdot$ via 着うたフル(R) site
2012	the first ten days of May	"Mirai"	music video	
2012	June 9	"Mirai"	Truetone	via 着うた(R) site
2012	June 9	シグナル～月曜日のルカ～	the theme song to the film	"Mirai"
2012	June 11	H.I.S.「Super Summer Sale」	in the TV commercial	$\cdot$ "Feel" $\cdot$ H.I.S. is a travel agency
2012	June 13	"Mirai"	$\cdot$ Regular edition: CD single $\cdot$ Limited edition: CD single + bonus DVD	coupled with "Feel"

== Track listing ==
Regular edition CD single

No.	Title	Lyrics	Music	Arrange	Length
1.	"Mirai"	Hanano Tanaka	Naohisa Taniguchi	CHOKKAKU	4:58
2.	"Feel"	Kazuaki Yamashita	Kazuaki Yamashita	Tomokazu "T.O.M" Matsuzawa	4:15
3.	"Mirai" (less vocal)		Naohisa Taniguchi	CHOKKAKU	4:58

Limited edition CD single

No.	Title	Lyrics	Music	Arrange	Length
1.	"Mirai"	Hanano Tanaka	Naohisa Taniguchi	CHOKKAKU	4:58
2.	"Feel"	Kazuaki Yamashita	Kazuaki Yamashita	Tomokazu "T.O.M" Matsuzawa	4:15
3.	"Mirai" (Signalized Ver.)	Hanano Tanaka	Naohisa Taniguchi	Naohisa Taniguchi	4:57
4.	"Mirai" (less vocal)		Naohisa Taniguchi	CHOKKAKU	4:58

Personnel

"Mirai"
vocals : Kylee
sound produce & all other instruments : CHOKKAKU
vocal arrangement & direction : Naohisa Taniguchi
electric bass : Takeshi Taneda
strings : Gen Ittetsu Strings

"Feel"
vocals : Kylee
sound produce & all other instruments : Tomokazu "T.O.M" Matsuzawa
vocal arrangement & direction : Naohisa Taniguchi
electric bass : Kota Hahimoto

"Mirai" (Signalized Ver.)
vocals : Kylee
sound produce & all other instruments : Naohisa Taniguchi
vocal arrangement & direction : Naohisa Taniguchi
electric bass : Masato Suzuki
strings : Okamura Mio Strings

Limited edition bonus DVD

1. "Mirai" music video
  - only Kylee's scenes ver.
  - director - Toshiyuki Suzuki
2. live concert footage
  - on October 10, 2011 at Shibuya Boxx, Tokyo
  - vocals - Kylee / keyboard - Troy Laureta / guitar - Chris Vasquez / bass - Bana Mendoza / drums - Valerie Franco

== Music video ==
- "Mirai" has two music videos. One is created of only Kylee's scenes. The other features scenes from the film Signal: Luca on Mondays. Kylee's scenes were filmed in Sedona, Arizona.
- The music video of "Feel" was filmed in Arizona. It features her little sister Ashley.

== Live performances ==
in support of the single "Mirai"

1. the late night music TV show Count Down TV
  - Setlist 1. Mirai
  - Performers vocals- Kylee guitar- Seira & Risa Ishibashi bass- Tomi drums- Mai Imamura strings quartet-
2. three concerts in Kawasaki & Nishinomiya
  - Setlist 1. It's You 2. Feel 3. Mirai 4. Crazy For You
  - Performers vocal- Kylee keyboards- Nino guitar- Risa Ishibashi
