= Elsewhere (Zevin novel) =

2005 book by Gabrielle Zevin

- Book cover
- Author: Gabrielle Zevin
- Language: English
- Genre: Magic realism
- Publisher: Farrar Straus Giroux
- Publication date: September 9, 2005
- Publication place: United States
- Media type: Print (hardback & paperback)
- Pages: 277

Elsewhere is a 2005 young adult, speculative novel by Gabrielle Zevin.

== Plot ==
Fifteen-year-old Liz is hit and killed by a taxi. When she wakes up, she finds herself in the cabin of a ship named the SS Nile. She meets her idol, who turns out to be dead, like her. The ship arrives to an island called "Elsewhere". In Elsewhere, everyone ages backwards until they reach 7 days old and then are sent back to Earth as a baby to be reborn. Liz meets her grandmother, who is very young by now, and takes care of Liz. Liz watches her own funeral from the "Observation Deck", or OD in short, and learns that though she is able to see Earth, she is not allowed to make contact with anyone there. Liz can not get over the fact that she is dead, and spends every day at the OD. While at the OD, she learns of a place named "The Well" that is rumored to be a place where someone who is in Elsewhere can make contact with someone on Earth. Liz's first attempt to reach Earth is unsuccessful. She gets caught by her grandmother right before she enters the water. The second attempt, however, is successful. She is able to reach out to her brother but is caught by Owen, whom she met on the island. Liz returns to her grandmother and is forced to get an "advocate", meet with an adviser, and get something similar to a job to take up her time and hopefully relieve her mind of her tragic depression. Liz picks animals, who, like humans, age backward in Elsewhere. She discovers that she can actually talk to animals. Owen contacts Liz's brother for her, taking a dive to The Well. Liz later learns that Owen was married to a woman named Emily on Earth, and when checking the list of new passengers, she finds Emily's name on it. As expected, Emily arrives at Elsewhere a few days later. Owen, Liz, and her grandmother meet Emily on her day of arrival at the ship. Emily is surprised to see Owen, and accepts Owen's request for their relationship to continue. However, after a while, Emily decides to "break up" with Owen, claiming that since she is in her 30s now and Owen is young, the feeling is very awkward. Owen realizes that he has developed feelings for Liz. Liz, meanwhile, is trying to get back to Earth by "early release", but is stopped again by Owen. This time Liz accepts her life in Elsewhere. Liz continues to age backward and works until age of 6. At her release ceremony, she is reunited with her roommate from the ship. Owen is only 2 when Liz is released, and throughout her journey to Earth, she thinks of Elsewhere. The novel ends with Liz being sent down the river and being reborn into her new life on Earth.

== Literary significance and reception ==
Elizabeth Spires gave the book a positive review for The New York Times, commending Zevin for her "fresh and arresting" premise, likening it to Madeleine L'Engle's A Wrinkle in Time and Natalie Babbitt's Tuck Everlasting. Teenreads.com called it "witty and wise" and praised the book for its humour. Booklist magazine gave the book a 'Starred Review' and called it "a work of powerful beauty".

In the USA, the book was nominated for a 2006 Quill award, won the Borders Original Voices Award, and was a selection of the Barnes & Noble Book Club. The book was also included on several "Best of" Lists including School Library Journal, Horn Book Magazine, Kirkus Reviews, Amazon.com, and the American Library Association Notable Children's Book list among others.

It has also won several awards abroad. In Germany, it was awarded the Lufti (Bronze) and the Ulmer Unke, and in the United Kingdom it won the Sheffield Children's Book Prize for Longer Novels and the Stockport Schools' Book Award. It was also longlisted for the Carnegie Medal.
