= Split screen effect =

Filmmaking technique

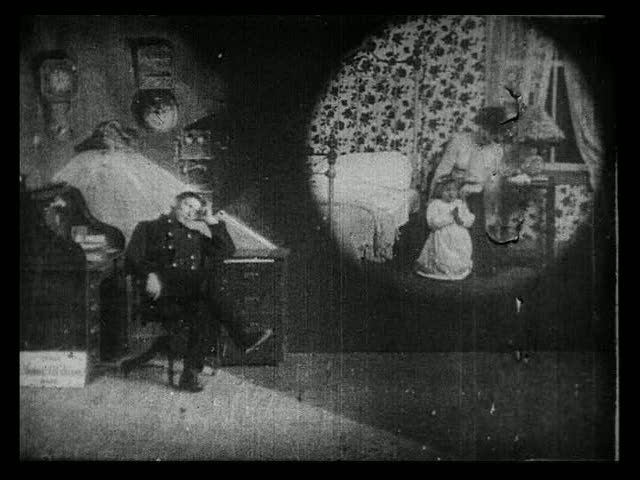
An early example of split screen in Life of an American Fireman (1903)

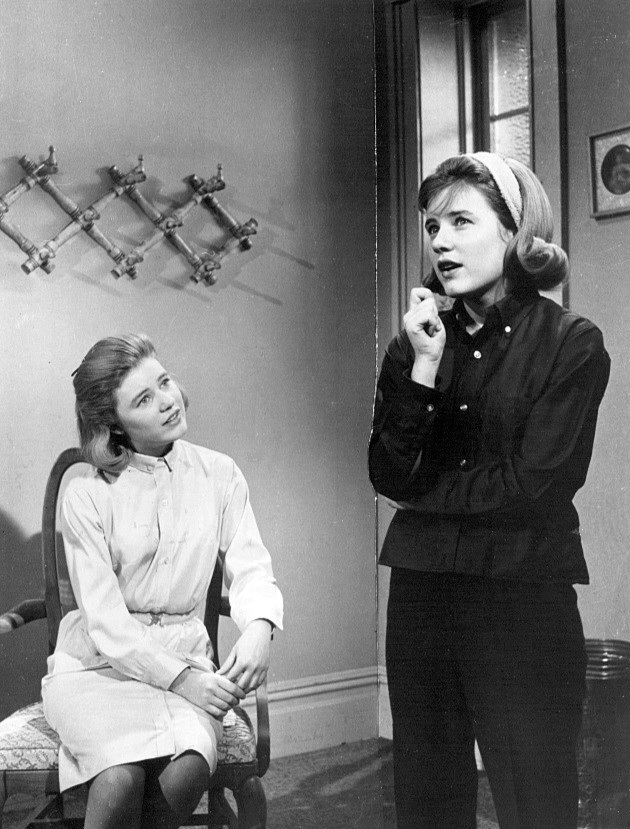
Patty Duke in the twin roles of identical cousins, Patty and Cathy, in the TV show The Patty Duke Show, an effect achieved by split screen

In film and video production, split screen is the visible division of the screen, traditionally in half, but also in several simultaneous images, rupturing the illusion that the screen's frame is a seamless view of reality, similar to that of the human eye. There may or may not be an explicit borderline. Until the arrival of digital technology, a split screen in films was accomplished by using an optical printer to combine two or more actions filmed separately by copying them onto the same negative, called the composite.

In filmmaking split screen is also a technique that allows one actor to appear twice in a scene. The simplest technique is to lock down the camera and shoot the scene twice, with one "version" of the actor appearing on the left side, and the other on the right side. The seam between the two splits is intended to be invisible, making the duplication seem realistic.

== Influences ==
An influential arena for the great split screen movies of the 1960s were two world's fairs - the 1964 New York World's Fair, where Ray and Charles Eames had a 17-screen film they created for IBM's "Think" Pavilion (it included sections with race car driving) and the 3-division film To Be Alive, by Francis Thompson, which won the Academy Award that year for Best Short. John Frankenheimer made Grand Prix after his visit to the 1964 New York World's Fair. The success of these pavilions further influenced the 1967 Universal exhibition in Montreal, commonly referred to as Expo 67, where multi-screen highlights included In the Labyrinth, hailed by Time magazine as a "stunning visual display," their review concluding: "such visual delights as Labyrinth ... suggest that cinema—the most typical of 20th century arts—has just begun to explore its boundaries and possibilities," as well as A Place to Stand, which displayed Christopher Chapman's pioneering "multi-dynamic image technique" of shifting multiple images. Directors Norman Jewison and Richard Fleischer conceived their ambitious split-screen films of 1968 after visiting Expo '67.

It is also common to use this technique to simultaneously portray both participants in a telephone conversation, a long-standing convention which dates back to early silents, as in Lois Weber's triangular frames in her 1913 Suspense, and culminating in Pillow Talk, where Doris Day and Rock Hudson share a party line. So linked to this convention are the Doris Day/Rock Hudson movies that Down With Love, the only slightly tongue-in-cheek homage, used split screen in several phone calls, explicitly parodying this use. In the 1971 Emmy Award-winning TV movie "Brian's Song" which portrays the story of former Chicago Bears running backs Brian Piccolo and Hall of Famer Gale Sayers, it's the night after Piccolo's second surgery and Piccolo (James Caan) is talking to Sayers (Billy Dee Williams) on the phone. There is a diagonal split screen from upper left corner to lower right corner (Piccolo on the right side and Sayers on the left). The BBC series Coupling made extensive use of split screen as one of several techniques that are unconventional for TV series, often to a humorous effect. One episode, 'Split', was even named after the use of the effect. The acclaimed Fox TV series 24 used split-screen extensively to depict the many simultaneous events, enhancing the show's real-time element as well as connecting its multiple storylines.

An unusual and revolutionary use of split screen as an extension to the cinematic vocabulary was invented by film director Roger Avary in The Rules of Attraction (2002) where two separate halves of a split screen are folded together into one seamless shot through the use of motion control photography. The much acclaimed shot was examined and detailed in Bravo Television's Anatomy of a Scene.

In 1975, behind the Iron Curtain, filmmaker Zbigniew Rybczynski created his experimental film Nowa Książka (Eng. New Book), where he split his screen into 9 small screens, shot on 35mm film. This innovative approach allowed him to create a fascinating continuous story of a man in a red hat and red coat. This film served as an inspiration for Timecode by Mike Figgis.

== Digital technology ==
The arrival of digital video technology has made dividing the screen much easier to accomplish, and recent digital films and music videos have explored this possibility in depth. Sometimes the technique is used to show actions occurring simultaneously; Timecode (2000), by Mike Figgis, is a recent example where the combination is of four real time digital video cameras shown continuously for the duration of the film. Split-screen can also be used to the extent that it becomes part of the narrative structure of a film, as in The Boston Strangler.

In contrast to the slow and labor-intensive photochemical process of an optical printer, digital compositing allows for effects to be created more efficiently.

== Usage ==
=== In films ===
Early use of split screen can be seen in The White Slave Trade (1910), Lois Weber and Phillips Smalley's Suspense (1913), where it is used to portray simultaneous actions, and in Yakov Protazanov's The Queen of Spades (1916), where one screen depicts reality and the other a character's inner desires. This technique has been used to portray twins in such films as Wonder Man (1945), The Dark Mirror (1946), The Parent Trap (both the 1961 original and the 1998 remake), and Adaptation (2002). In the 1961 version of The Parent Trap, conversations between the twins were simulated by filming the actress (Hayley Mills) as she stood at the left of the frame facing right, then filming her again, standing at the right and facing left. The negative of the first action was placed into a printer and copied onto another negative, the composite, but this other negative was masked so that only the right part of the original picture is copied. Then the composite was rewound and the negative of the second action was copied onto the right side of each frame. On this second pass, the left side was masked to prevent double exposure. This technique is then carefully hidden by background lines, such as windows, doors, etc. to disguise the split.

Suspense (1913), a short thriller in which split screen is used to show a phone conversation during a home intrusion

In Indiscreet (1958), the technique was famously used to bypass the censors and allow Cary Grant and Ingrid Bergman to be in bed together, and even to appear to pat her on the bottom.

Several studio-made films in the 1960s popularized the use of split screen. They include John Frankenheimer's Grand Prix (1966), Richard Fleischer's The Boston Strangler (1968), and Norman Jewison's The Thomas Crown Affair (1968). In the 1970s, usage continued in films like Airport (1970), Woodstock (1970), The Andromeda Strain (1971), Sisters (1972), Carrie (1976) and More American Graffiti (1979).

Title sequence designer Saul Bass lamented the popularity of split screen in the 1960s. Although he used it extensively in his work for Grand Prix, he later claimed that it had been artistically exhausted from excessive use. According to Bass:

"The point is, it's a device, and as far as I'm concerned I'll never use it again — if it actually cries out for it, I'll use it but as a device it's lost its currency, because, later on, it was, unfortunately, used meaninglessly. It's the kind of thing that grows up without ever having a youth and there's no opportunity to explore it. On Grand Prix I took the multiple image... and carried it down the line quite a way. I think it is terrific at expressing muchness, but I suspect it's not capable of expressing deep feeling or contemplative..."

Hans Canosa's 2005 film Conversations with Other Women made extensive use of split screens. Conversations juxtaposed shot and reverse shot of two actors in the same take, captured with two cameras, for the entire movie. The film was designed to enlist the audience as perceptual editors, as they can choose to watch either character act and react in real time. While the shot/reverse shot function of split screen comprises most of the running time of the film, the filmmakers also used split screen for other spatial, temporal and emotional effects. Conversations' split screen sometimes showed flashbacks of the recent or distant past juxtaposed with the present; moments imagined or hoped by the characters juxtaposed with present reality; present experience fractured into more than one emotion for a given line or action, showing an actor performing the same moment in different ways; and present and near future actions juxtaposed to accelerate the narrative in temporal overlap.

=== By filmmakers ===
The visionary French director, Abel Gance, used the term "Polyvision" to describe his three-camera, three-projector technique for both widening and dividing the screen in his 1927 silent epic, Napoléon. The filmmaker Brian De Palma has incorporated split screens into many of his films, most notably in Sisters (1973) and they have since become synonymous with his filmmaking style (Specifically 1981's Blow Out and 1998's Snake Eyes).

=== In technology ===
The "Interactive Olaf" bonus feature from the DVD release of Lemony Snicket's A Series of Unfortunate Events shows Jim Carrey's makeup tests from the movie in a four-way split-screen. Viewers can split the audio by selecting which one to listen to, then pressing "ENTER" on their DVD remote. The split screen has also been simulated in video games, most notably Fahrenheit where it is used to allow a player to keep track of multiple simultaneous elements relevant to the gameplay.

=== In music video ===
A number of music videos have made creative use of split screen presentations. In Michael Jackson's "Billie Jean" video a number of freeze frames are shown in split screen. Video and film director Michel Gondry has made extensive use of split screen techniques in his videos. One notable example is "Sugar Water" - Cibo Matto (1996), where one side of the screen shows the video played normally, and the other side shows the same video played backwards. Through careful and creative staging the two sides appear to interact directly - passing objects from side to side and visually referencing each other. The music video for "Doo Wop (That Thing)" by Lauryn Hill was filmed using a split screen technique, the video features Lauryn, performing the song at block parties in two different eras: the mid-1960s (The year 1967 is shown on the left of the video) and the late-1990s (The year 1998 is shown on the right).

=== In television ===
The split screen has also been used extensively in television programs. Newscasts often show two reporters in a split screen frame. The sitcom That '70s Show, Nickelodeon teen sitcom Drake & Josh, Disney Channel teen sitcom Lizzie McGuire, USA Network's Burn Notice and Fox's 24 made extensive use of split screens. It is sometimes used in game shows to show two contestants simultaneously, and on cable news shows, when participants in a discussion are in different locations.

Split screens are frequently used in motor racing, especially during safety car pit stops in the IndyCar Series and NASCAR, where four way splits are used, most often with three leading cars or trucks' pit stops shown on the left and a shot of the pit exit (where restart order is determined after pit stops) on the right, with some featuring just four different cars or trucks making pit stops. Often these pit stops can change the entire outcome of a race. In sports, an instant replay, highlights package, or featurette on a specific subject relating to the play may be shown in a corner while the main play is happening.

Split screens showcasing individual character reactions are a common device of Japanese anime, where they imitate the panel layouts of manga. These sometimes feature more than two characters at once, and may be split at oblique angles.

In 2019, Snapchat's original content arm, Snap Originals, released a series called 'Two Sides', which followed a young couple as they navigated a breakup, told from both perspectives at the same time. Season Two and Season Three will be released in 2021.

Split screens are sometimes used during commercial breaks, as in ESPN's "Side-By-Side" coverage of racing, where one side of the screen shows race footage and the other shows advertising. This allows commercial to be shown while not interrupting coverage of race action.

Split screens are also common in advertising, often to show comparison.

== Notable uses of split screen ==
Title	Year	Director	Notes
Santa Claus	1898	George Albert Smith	
Life of an American Fireman	1903	Edwin S. Porter	
Suspense	1913	Lois Weber	
The Queen of Spades	1916	Yakov Protazanov	
Napoléon	1927	Abel Gance	Presented with three projectors in Polyvision
Pillow Talk	1959	Michael Gordon	
The Patty Duke Show	1963–1966	Various	Television series in which the actress, Patty Duke, played twin characters — identical cousins, Patty and Cathy — throughout the 105-episode run of the programme.
To Be Alive!	1964	Alexander Hammid; Francis Thompson	Short film produced for the 1964 New York World's Fair, presented on multiple screens
Chelsea Girls	1966	Paul Morrissey; Andy Warhol	Presented side by side with two projectors for film's entirety
Grand Prix	1966	John Frankenheimer	
A Place to Stand	1967	Christopher Chapman	Originally presented at Expo 67
In the Labyrinth	1967	Roman Kroitor; Colin Low; Hugh O'Connor	Originally presented on multiple screens at Expo 67; later reissued in a single-screen format
Col cuore in gola	1967	Tinto Brass	
Charly	1968	Ralph Nelson	
The Thomas Crown Affair	1968	Norman Jewison	
The Boston Strangler	1968	Richard Fleischer	
Eagles Over London	1969	Enzo G. Castellari	
Airport	1970	George Seaton	
Dionysus in '69	1970	Brian De Palma	Presented side by side through optical printing for film's entirety
Multiple Sidosis	1970	Sid Lavarents	Short film
Woodstock	1970	Michael Wadleigh	Documentary of the Woodstock Festival
The Andromeda Strain	1971	Robert Wise	
Sisters	1972	Brian De Palma	
Wicked, Wicked	1973	Richard L. Bare	Presented side by side through optical printing for film's entirety
Phantom of the Paradise	1974	Brian De Palma	
Nowa Książka (eng. New Book)	1975	Zbigniew Rybczynski	The screen is split into nine screens, 35mm short film, 10:26, SMFF Se-Ma-For Lodz, Poland
Carrie	1976	Brian De Palma	
Twilight's Last Gleaming	1977	Robert Aldrich	
Dressed to Kill	1980	Brian De Palma	
Blow Out	1981	Brian De Palma	
Sammy and Rosie Get Laid	1987	Stephen Frears	
Wall Street	1987	Oliver Stone	
The Bonfire of the Vanities	1990	Brian De Palma	
Repossessed	1992	Bob Logan	Used for comedic effect in a telephone conversation scene where one character crosses the "split" after the other person leave their phone off the hook.
Boogie Nights	1997	Paul Thomas Anderson	
Jackie Brown	1997	Quentin Tarantino	
"Closing Time"	1998	Chris Applebaum	Music video for the Semisonic song
Snake Eyes	1998	Brian De Palma	
Run Lola Run	1998	Tom Tykwer	
The X-Files	1998	Chris Carter	Episode "Triangle"
The Virgin Suicides	1999	Sofia Coppola	
SpongeBob SquarePants	1999	Stephen Hillenburg	Episode "Missing Identity"
The Boy Who Saw the Iceberg	2000	Paul Driessen	Animated short
Requiem for a Dream	2000	Darren Aronofsky	
Snatch	2000	Guy Ritchie	
Timecode	2000	Mike Figgis	Screen is split into quadrants, each showing a different sequence
24	2001–10, 2014	Stephen Hopkins, Various	Television series
Femme Fatale	2002	Brian De Palma	
Adaptation	2002	Spike Jonze	
The Rules of Attraction	2002	Roger Avary	
Spooks	2002	Various	Television series
Down with Love	2003	Peyton Reed	
Kill Bill	2003	Quentin Tarantino	
Pretend	2003	Julie Talen	
Hulk	2003	Ang Lee	
Sexual Dependency	2003	Rodrigo Bellott	
Sideways	2004	Alexander Payne	
Conversations with Other Women	2005	Hans Canosa	
The Tracey Fragments	2007	Bruce McDonald	
A Wednesday!	2008	Neeraj Pandey	Hindi film
OSS 117: Lost in Rio	2009	Michel Hazanavicius	
500 Days of Summer	2009	Marc Webb	
127 Hours	2010	Danny Boyle	
Scott Pilgrim vs. the World	2010	Edgar Wright	
The Social Network	2010	David Fincher	
Love, Chunibyo & Other Delusions	2012	Tatsuya Ishihara	Anime series
Dhoom 3	2013	Vijay Krishna Acharya	Hindi Film
R... Rajkumar	2013	Prabhu Deva	One Scene / Hindi Film
Kalyeserye	2015–2016	Bert de Leon, Poochie Rivera, Rich Ilustre	A soap opera parody aired live during the "Juan for All, All for Juan" segment of Philippine noontime variety show Eat Bulaga! on GMA Network in the Philippines.
The Man from U.N.C.L.E.	2015	Guy Ritchie	
Fargo	2015	Randall Einhorn	Season 2
The Mindy Project	2017	Various	Final Season
The Indian Detective	2017	Various	Mini-series
Last Call	2019	Gavin Michael Booth	The film's entirety is a 77 minute split-screen single take.
Vortex	2021	Gaspar Noé	A film about a dying octogenarian husband and wife, there is a split screen dividing the couple throughout nearly the entire film.

== See also ==
- Multi-dynamic image technique
- Polyvision
