= Kimi ga Iru Kara (Kylee song) =

Single by Kylee
- Released: March 24, 2010
- Label: Defstar
- Songwriters: Hanano Tanaka, Naohisa Taniguchi

"Kimi ga Iru Kara" (キミがいるから) is a single by a Japanese American singer Kylee. This single includes 3 songs: "Kimi ga Iru Kara", "On My Own" & "She Wishes". All songs are used in the film Memoirs of a Teenage Amnesiac and "Kimi ga Iru Kara" is also the theme song.

== Release history ==
Release Date		Title	Format	Notes
Year	Month/Day	Title	Format	Notes
2010	March 10	"Kimi ga Iru Kara"	Truetone	via 着うた(R) site
2010	March 24	"Kimi ga Iru Kara"	CD single	including "On My Own" & "She Wishes"
2010	March 27	Memoirs of a Teenage Amnesiac	in the film	"Kimi ga Iru Kara" "On My Own" "She Wishes"
2011	November 23	"17"	CD, CD + bonus DVD	including "Kimi ga Iru Kara"
2012	November 7	"Kimi ga Iru Kara" "On My Own" "She Wishes"	digital download	via iTunes Store

== Track listing ==
CD single

No.	Title	Lyrics	Music	Arrange	Length
1.	"Kimi ga Iru Kara"	Hanano Tanaka	Naohisa Taniguchi	CHOKKAKU	5:02
2.	"On My Own"	Kylee	masasucks	masasucks	3:10
3.	"She Wishes"	Kylee	nature living	nature living	4:23
4.	"Kimi ga Iru Kara" (less vocal)		Naohisa Taniguchi	CHOKKAKU	5:02

Personnel

"Kimi ga Iru Kara"
vocals : Kylee
sound produce & all other instruments : CHOKKAKU
vocal arrangement & direction : Naohisa Taniguchi
mix : D.O.I

"On My Own"
vocals : Kylee
guitar : masasucks
bass : Chris Chaney
drums : Scott Garrett
produce : Jeff Turzo
engineering & additional production : Jesse Astin
mix : Sean Beavan

"She Wishes"
vocals : Kylee
all instruments : nature living
vocal direction : Naohisa Taniguchi
mix : Eric Westfall

== Music video ==
The music video for "Kimi ga Iru Kara" was filmed in Los Angeles.
