= Kylee Saunders =

American singer (born 1994)

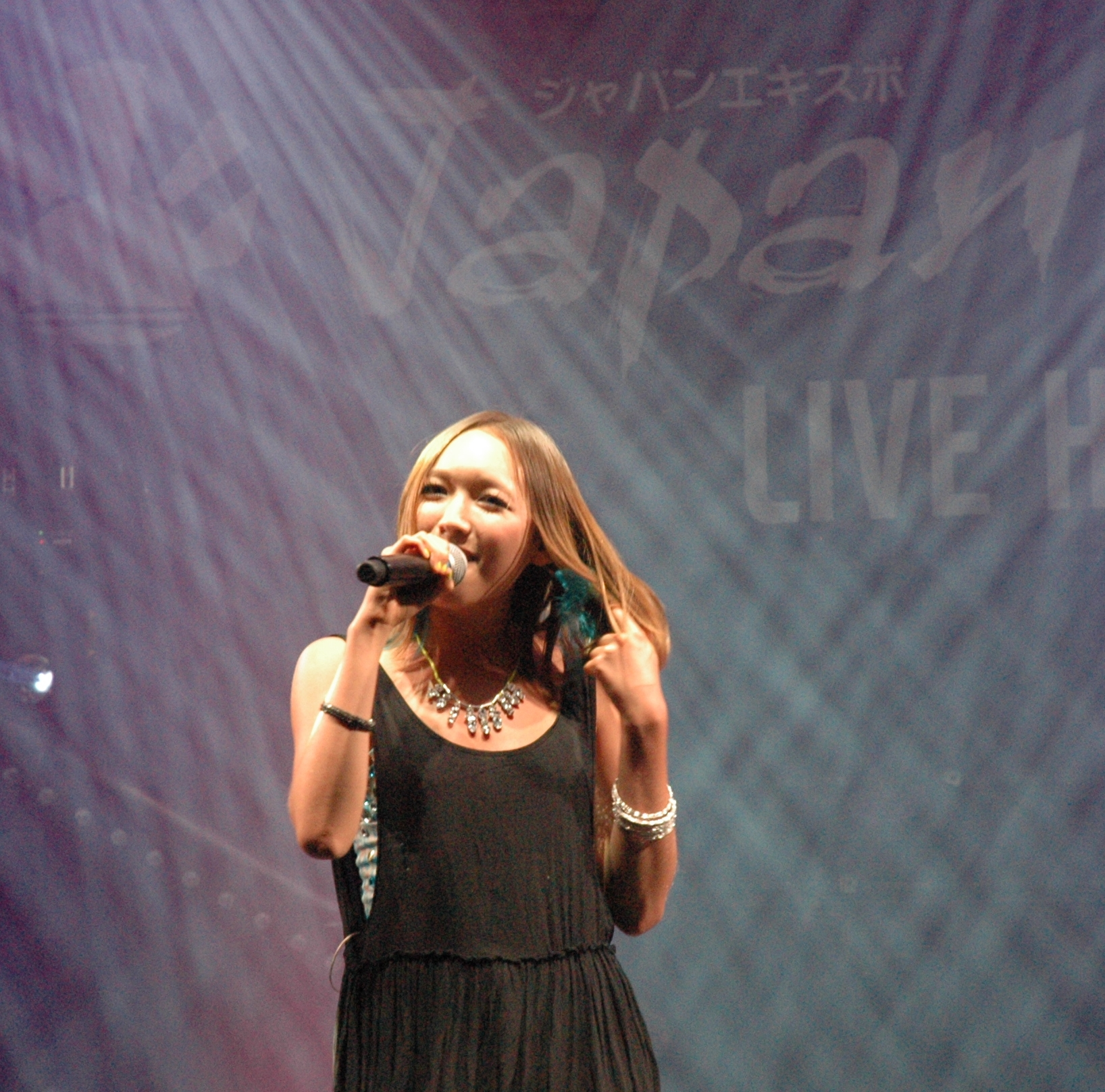
- Saunders at Japan Expo Paris in 2013

Background information
- Also known as: Kylee
- Born: May 25, 1994 (age 32); Chandler, Arizona, United States
- Origin: Portland, Oregon, United States
- Genres: Rock, pop
- Occupation: Singer
- Years active: 2008–2015 (on hiatus)
- Labels: DefStar Records; RX-Records; UK Project Inc.
- Website: www.kylee.jp

Kylee Saunders (born 25 May 1994), sometimes known mononymously as Kylee, is an American singer who is signed with Sony Music Japan's DefStar Records label.

== Early life and career ==
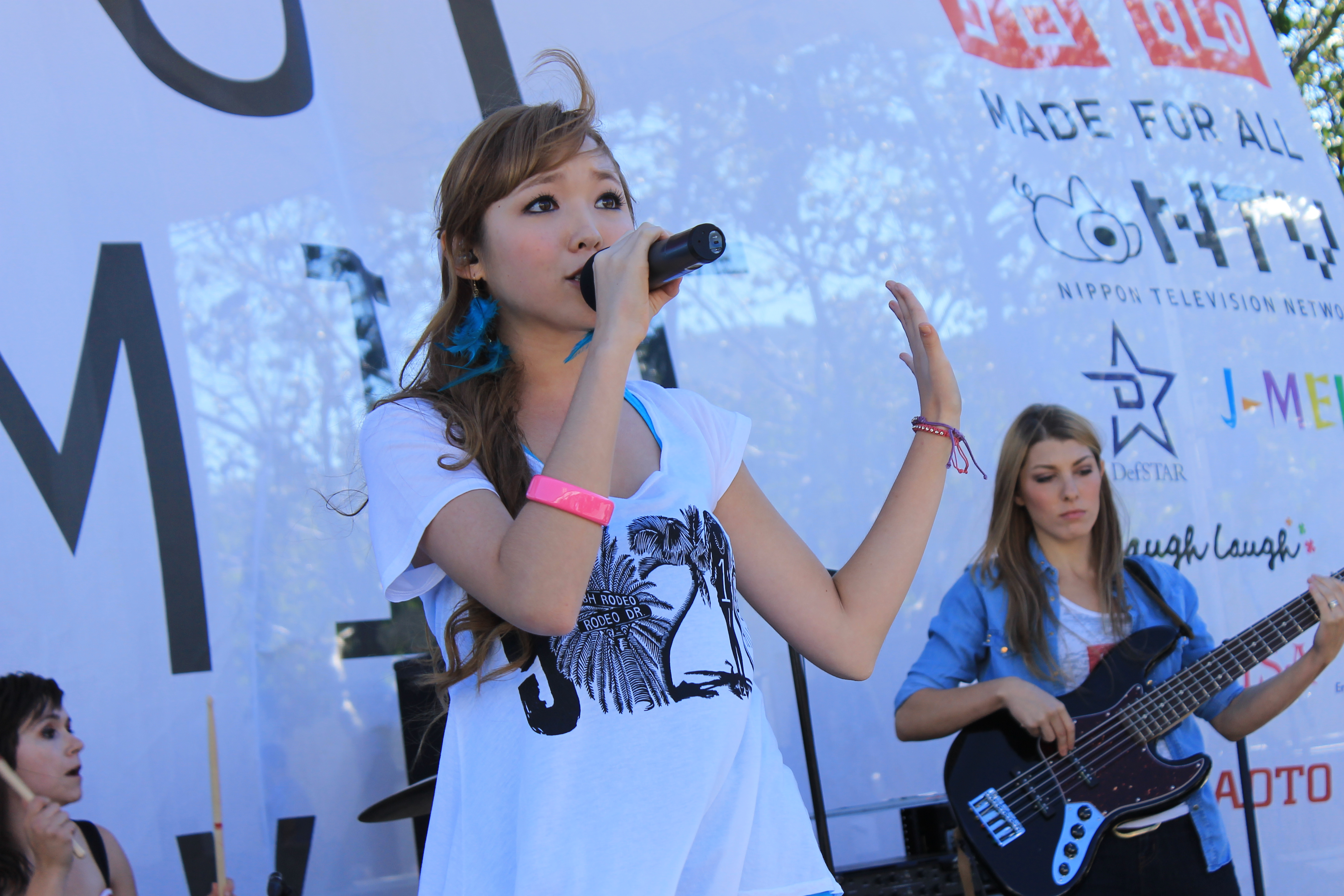
Live in 2012

Kylee Saunders was born in Chandler, Arizona, to a Japanese mother and British American father. Her father inspired her to become a singer. She has a younger sister and a younger brother. When she was eleven years old, she passed an audition to perform the national anthem at the opening of an NBA game, earning a standing ovation. This performance earned her the interest of music producers, and she was signed onto the independent label RX-Records. Saunders attended Stoller Middle School in Portland, Oregon, until 2007, when she returned to Arizona. She then attended Hamilton High School and in 2016 graduated from Stanford University with a bachelor's degree.

On October 17, 2008, her first single, "Vacancy", was released by RX-Records in the United States as a digital single. "Vacancy" was featured as the ending theme to the Sony Computer Entertainment anime series Xam'd: Lost Memories. On March 24, 2010, Saunders released her first major-label single under Sony Music Japan's label DefStar Records, titled "Kimi ga Iru Kara" (キミがいるから; "Because You Are Here"), which was featured as the theme song to the 2010 film Memoirs of a Teenage Amnesiac, a Japan-America co-production in which she also gave a cameo performance. Her second major-label single, "Missing/It's You", was slated for release on July 7, 2010, with "Missing" being the second opening theme song to the Bones and Stan Lee anime Heroman. She also performed as one of the opening acts for the 2010 Summer Sonic Festival, playing on the Urban/Dance Stage. This was followed by her single "Everlasting", which was used as the theme song for the second episode of the Mobile Suit Gundam Unicorn OVA series. Saunders appeared on NBC's Today in the United States on May 13, 2011, where she was interviewed by Hoda Kotb and Kathie Lee Gifford, before she performed her fourth major single "Never Give Up". Kylee performed at Otakon 2011 on July 31, 2011, in Baltimore, Maryland, her US concert debut. Her fifth major single, "Crazy for You", was released on October 5, 2011; the song was used in Japanese online clothing retailer Nissen's 2011 fall collection television commercial. Saunders released her debut album, 17, on November 23, 2011. She also did a duet with Sam Tsui in May 2013. She was married August 2017.

== Discography ==
=== The RX-Records era (2008–2009) ===
==== Single ====
Release Date		Title	Notes	EP
Year	Month/Day	Title	Notes	EP
2008	December 3	"Vacancy"	The ending theme to the anime Xam'd: Lost Memories; B-sides: "Justice", "Plan B"; Available for download on USA iTunes	Kylee meets Xam'd: Lost Memories (DefStar Records)

==== EP ====
Release Date		Title	Notes
Year	Month/Day	Title	Notes
2009	March 4	Love Kicks...	Includes "You Get Me", "Empty Handed" and more

=== The DefStar Records era (2009–) ===
==== Singles ====
Release Date		Title	Notes	Album
Year	Month/Day	Title	Notes	Album
2010	March 24	"Kimi ga Iru Kara" (キミがいるから)	Theme song to the film Memoirs of a Teenage Amnesiac; B-sides: "On My Own", "She Wishes"	17
2010	July 7	"Missing / It's You"	"Missing" is the 2nd opening theme to the anime television series Heroman; the coupling track "Just Go"	17
2010	October 27	"Everlasting"	Theme to the second episode of the anime Mobile Suit Gundam Unicorn; B-side: "The Luckiest Girl in the World"; All tracks are available as downloads on USA iTunes.	17
2011	July 13	"Never Give Up"		17
2011	October 5	"Crazy for You"	500,000 downloads	17
2012	June 13	"Mirai" (未来)	Theme song to the film Signal: Luca on Mondays (シグナル～月曜日のルカ～); B-side: "Feel"	
2013	February 13	"Daisukinanoni" (大好きなのに)	Second opening theme to the anime television series Blast of Tempest; B-side: "Anywhere" (closing credits song for J-Melo, Oct–Dec 2012)	

==== Digital singles ====
Release Date		Title	Notes	Album
Year	Month/Day	Title	Notes	Album
2013	May 8	"Just Give Me a Reason"	Cover of a song by Pink featuring Fun's lead singer, Nate Ruess; Available for download on iTunes Stores all over the world; With YouTube stars Sam Tsui and Kurt Hugo Schneider; Released as Sam Tsui feat. Kylee under mudhutdigital.com	
2013	July 1	"Crazy for You" (English version)	With two English cover anime songs (Naruto and Rurouni Kenshin); Available on iTunes Stores & Amazon in 20 countries, but not in Japan	
2013	August 7	"Crazy for You" (English version)	Japan-only release; With two English covers and one new heavy rock song, "Don't Say Goodbye"	
2013	October 7	"Wrecking Ball"	Miley Cyrus cover; Available for download on iTunes Stores all over the world; With YouTube stars Sam Tsui and Kurt Hugo Schneider; Released as Sam Tsui feat. Kylee under mudhutdigital.com	

==== EPs ====
Release Date		Title	Notes
Year	Month/Day	Title	Notes
2009	July 29	Kylee meets Xam'd: Lost Memories	Includes "Vacancy", "Just Breathe" and "Over U"; All songs are the ending themes to the anime Xam'd: Lost Memories; The EP was recorded in only two months

==== Studio albums ====
Release Date		Title	Notes
Year	Month/Day	Title	Notes
2011	November 23 (Japan)	17	Including "Unnoticed", "Yours Truly", "Brand New Wave" (feat. Orianthi) and more
2013	July 1 (20 other countries)	17	Including "Unnoticed", "Yours Truly", "Brand New Wave" (feat. Orianthi) and more

==== Album appearances ====
Release Date		Song	Album	Notes
Year	Month/Day	Song	Album	Notes
2012	October 24	"My Generation" (Yui cover)	She Loves You (A Tribute to Yui)	a new recording
2013	March 27	"Never Give Up"	女子力を磨く歌 (Girl Power Songs) (avex trax)	Taken from 17
2013	August 28	"One"	Ivory7 Chord's second mini album, Synesthesia (magnifique)	only co-writing lyrics

== Live performances ==
2009

- Hurley NIGHTS Vol. 0
- Summer Sonic Festival

2010

- Girl Pop Factory
- Summer Sonic Festival

2011

- NBC's TODAY show
- Otakon
- Minami Wheel
- Girls Award by CROOZ blog 2011 Autumn/Winter
- FIFA Club World Cup

2012

- Otodama Sea Studio (Japan)
- MTV ZUSHI FES 12 supported by RIVIERA (Japan)
- J-POP Summit Festival (USA)
- Inazuma Rock Fes (Japan)

2013

- Northern California Cherry Blossom Festival (USA)
- Japan Day @ Central Park (USA)
- Japan Expo (France)
- J-POP Summit Festival (USA)

2014

- Playlist Live (USA)
- J-POP Summit Festival (USA)

== Covers on YouTube ==
Kylee started a covers project on YouTube.

Release Date		Song	Original Artists	Notes
Year	Month/Day	Song	Original Artists	Notes
2013	May 15	"Just Give Me a Reason"	Pink featuring Fun's lead singer Nate Ruess	with Sam Tsui and Kurt Schneider
2013	August 26	"Come & Get It"	Selena Gomez	video director: Jerry Corria
2013	October 5	"Clarity"	Zedd featuring Foxes	video director: Daisuke Okamoto; producer: Troy Laureta
2013	October 6	"Wrecking Ball"	Miley Cyrus	with Sam Tsui and Kurt Schneider
2013	November 28	"Young and Beautiful" remix	Lana Del Rey	video director: Ryusuke Okajima; producer & remix: Wiley Webb; vocal producer: Troy Laureta; remix & additional production: Thor Laewe
2014	January 11	"Story of My Life" / "Best Song Ever" mashup	One Direction	video director: Tadashi Tawarayama; cover producer: Merchants Of Venice Entertainment (M.O.V.E)
2014	January 23	"Mirrors" / "Stay" / "Holy Grail" mashup	Justin Timberlake / Rihanna featuring Mikky Ekko / Jay-Z featuring Justin Timberlake	director/editor: Ross Ching; music producer: PJ Bianco
2014	February 4	"Let It Go" from Disney's film Frozen	Idina Menzel / Demi Lovato	video: Richard Frias; song producer: Troy Laureta; acoustic guitar: John Nott
2014	February 10	Valentine's Day Love Medley! (27 songs in 3 mins): 1. Ne-Yo - "Let Me Love You"; 2. Justin Bieber - "As Long As You Love Me"; 3. Calvin Harris - "I Need Your Love"; 4. Rihanna - "We Found Love"; 5. Drake - "Find Your Love"; 6. Justin Bieber - "Somebody to Love"; 7. Leona Lewis - "Bleeding Love"; 8. Sara Bareilles - "Love Song"; 9. Selena Gomez & the Scene - "Love You Like A Love Song"; 10. Taylor Swift - "Love Story"; 11. Haddaway - "What Is Love"; 12. Kanye West - "Love Lockdown"; 13. Maroon 5 - "She Will Be Loved"; 14. Maroon 5 - "Love Somebody"; 15. The Beatles - "All You Need is Love"; 16. Usher - "DJ's Got Us Falling In Love"; 17. Elvis Presley – "Can't Help Falling In Love"; 18. Kesha - "Your Love Is My Drug"; 19. Cher - "Believe"; 20. Foreigner - "I Want To Know What Love Is"; 21. Lady Gaga - "LoveGame"; 22. Plain White T's - "Rhythm of Love"; 23. Dolly Parton - "I Will Always Love You"; 24. The Shirelles - "Will You Still Love Me Tomorrow"; 25. Rihanna - "I Love The Way You Lie"; 26. Elton John - "Can You Feel The Love Tonight"; 27. Icona Pop - "I Love It"	Ne-Yo / Justin Bieber / Calvin Harris / Rihanna / Taylor Swift and more	with Chester See and Kurt Schneider

== Management ==
Kylee is managed in the US and Japan by Antinos Management America.
