= The Storied Life of A.J. Fikry =

- Theatrical release poster
- Directed by: Hans Canosa
- Written by: Gabrielle Zevin
- Based on: The Storied Life of A.J. Fikry by Gabrielle Zevin
- Produced by: Hans Canosa; Gabrielle Zevin; Claude Dal Farra; Brian Keady; Kelsey Law
- Starring: Kunal Nayyar; Lucy Hale; Christina Hendricks; David Arquette; Scott Foley
- Distributed by: Vertical Entertainment
- Release date: October 7, 2022
- Running time: 105 minutes
- Country: United States
- Language: English

The Storied Life of A.J. Fikry is a 2022 American comedy drama film written by Gabrielle Zevin, directed by Hans Canosa and starring Kunal Nayyar, Lucy Hale, Christina Hendricks, David Arquette and Scott Foley. It is based on Zevin's book of the same title.

== Plot ==
The film follows A.J. Fikry, a reclusive and grieving bookstore owner on Alice Island, whose life takes a dramatic turn after a series of events. Following the theft of his rare copy of Tamerlane, A.J. discovers a 2-year-old girl, Maya, abandoned in his store. He eventually adopts her with the support of friends like Officer Lambiase and Ismay, his sister-in-law.

A.J.'s relationship with Amelia Loman, a sales representative, evolves from initial antagonism to friendship and romance. Their bond deepens after Amelia ends her engagement, leading to marriage. Tragedy strikes when Ismay's husband, Daniel, dies in a car crash. Seven years later, Maya grows into a talented writer, supported by A.J. and Amelia.

A.J. is diagnosed with cancer, prompting revelations about Maya's origins and the theft of Tamerlane. As his health declines, A.J. shares poignant moments with his loved ones before dying. The story concludes with Maya and Amelia leaving Alice Island, while Lambiase and Ismay decide to preserve the bookstore in A.J.'s memory.

== Cast ==
- Kunal Nayyar as A.J. Fikry
- Lucy Hale as Amelia “Amy” Loman
- Christina Hendricks as Ismay Evans
- David Arquette as Officer Nick Lambiase
- Scott Foley as Daniel Parrish
- Jordyn McIntosh as Maya (5yr old)

== Production ==
In June 2021, it was announced that Nayyar, Hendricks and Hale were cast in the film. In December 2021, it was announced that Arquette and Foley were cast in the film.

Filming took place on Cape Cod from November to December 2021.

== Release ==
In May 2022, it was announced that the North American distribution rights to the film were acquired by Vertical Entertainment. The film was released on October 7, 2022.

== Reception ==
The film has a 33% rating on Rotten Tomatoes based on 18 reviews. Sumner Forbes of Film Threat rated the film a 7 out of 10. Monique Jones of Common Sense Media awarded the film three stars out of five. Chris Knight of the National Post awarded the film two stars out of five. Michael O'Sullivan of The Washington Post awarded the film two stars out of four.

Jericho Tadeo of MovieWeb gave the film a negative review and wrote, "Between the Hallmark-y score and certain narrative beats that, in literary form, may read as engrossing, but, on-screen, err towards the overly sugary, Fikry can't seem to find its place between the grounded and the grandiose."
