= Tomorrow, and Tomorrow, and Tomorrow (novel) =

2022 novel by Gabrielle Zevin

- Cover of the first edition, which features The Great Wave off Kanagawa in the background
- Author: Gabrielle Zevin
- Language: English
- Published: July 5, 2022
- Publisher: Knopf Publishing Group
- Publication place: United States
- Pages: 476
- ISBN: 978-0-593-32120-1

Tomorrow, and Tomorrow, and Tomorrow is a 2022 novel by Gabrielle Zevin. The novel follows the relationship between two friends who begin a successful video game company together. It is Zevin's fifth novel for adults and tenth novel overall.

== Premise ==
Set over the course of several decades, Tomorrow, and Tomorrow, and Tomorrow follows video game developers Sadie Green and Sam Masur, childhood friends who reunite while both studying at universities in Cambridge, Massachusetts. Along with Sam's roommate and friend Marx Watanabe, Sam and Sadie begin developing a video game and later co-manage a successful video game studio, Unfair Games.

== Plot ==
In the 1980s, adolescents Sam Masur and Sadie Green meet in a pediatric hospital. Sadie's older sister, Alice, is being treated for childhood leukemia, while Sam is undergoing multiple surgeries on his foot, which was crushed in the car crash that killed his mother. Having become selectively mute since the crash, Sam spends all his time playing games on the Nintendo Entertainment System in the hospital game room. Nurses encourage Sadie to play with him; having someone to share games with causes Sam to begin speaking again and the pair become best friends. Finding out that spending time with Sam can count as community service as required for her bat mitzvah, Sadie begins tallying her hours at the hospital, though she values her time with Sam more than fulfilling the requirement. After her recovery, a jealous Alice tells Sam about the tally sheet, which deeply offends him, having believed that Sadie spent time with him out of obligation rather than genuine friendship. Sam and Sadie stop speaking and don't see one another again for six years.

The pair reunite by chance at a train station in Boston when both are nineteen. Sam is studying math at Harvard and Sadie computer science at MIT. Still suffering issues with his foot, Sam lives off-campus with Marx, an amateur Shakespearean acting student who has come to see Sam as the brother he always wanted as a child. Sadie impulsively asks Sam to playtest a video game she programmed for a software design class and he agrees. Sam and Marx play the game and are impressed to discover it to be a simulation that tricks the player into believing they are building mundane factory parts when in fact they are manufacturing equipment for the Nazis during the Holocaust. Meanwhile, Sadie's professor, Dov, a successful game programmer in his own right, becomes enamored with Sadie due to the game. The two begin an affair and Dov begins mentoring Sadie on how to become a better programmer. Their relationship ultimately crumbles when the married Dov decides to return to his wife.

Sadie falls into a deep depression and stops eating and bathing. Sam begins visiting her, and eventually convinces her to program a game together with him. Sadie moves in with Sam and Marx and they convert the apartment into a game studio called Unfair Games with Marx as their producer. Sam and Sadie conceptualize Ichigo, an adventure game about a child lost at sea who must find their way back home. Struggling to develop a graphics engine, Sam encourages Sadie to ask Dov for his own, and the two resume their affair. With Dov acting as a producer and equity partner for Ichigo, Sadie and Sam complete the game. Unfair Games is offered the choice between a lucrative distribution deal from Opus, a large company, that will take away creative control of Ichigo and require a sequel or a more modest offer that gives them more freedom. Sam and Dov pressure Sadie into accepting the former.

Ichigo becomes a pop culture phenomenon and Sam and Sadie become celebrities, though Sadie bristles at game journalists' sexist assumptions that Sam contributed more to the game and company. As Sadie and Dov's relationship progresses, Dov takes more control over Sadie. Sadie and Sam's relationship further deteriorates over the question of whether he had, in essence, prostituted her to Dov in exchange for help with Ichigo's graphics. Sam advertises Ichigo to Opus' demands and Sadie works on the Ichigo sequel.

Sam wishes to work on an Ichigo 3 in favor of working on Sadie's dream project, an elaborate RPG called Both Sides that takes place between alternate realities. Sam, Sadie, and Marx move to Los Angeles to establish Unfair as a corporate entity. Sadie uses this opportunity to break up with Dov. Both Sides is a commercial and critical failure. Over a trip to Japan, Marx and Sadie connect and begin dating, during the trip Marx has a revelation dream to create a spin off to Both Sides' idyllic American suburb of Mapletown into an online RPG called Mapleworld, which proves to be the company's greatest success. Sam's jealousy of Sadie and Marx's relationship and Sadie's discomfort with Sam gaining credit for their work further drives a wedge between them.

While Unfair produces several lucrative games outside of Sadie and Sam's partnership, Sadie argues with Sam that Unfair's next project should be Master of the Revels, a Shakespearean-themed interactive mystery drama, action-adventure game. Sam initially balks, and she develops the game on her own. Upon playing its demo, though, he compliments her work. It proves to be another success and Sam and Sadie go on tour to promote it for the Christmas 2005 season. In their absence, an attacker comes to the Unfair Headquarters looking for Sam, angry that he legalized gay marriage in Mapleworld. In Sam's absence, the extremist murders Marx before shooting himself.

Sadie, pregnant with her and Marx's child, becomes a recluse and leaves the running of Unfair to Sam. Having already planned development for an expansion pack for Master of the Revels, Sadie produces it from home, programming in a likeness of Marx who recites soliloquies from Macbeth, his favorite play. After giving birth, Sadie suffers from postpartum depression, but finds solace in an Oregon Trail-like MMORPG where she befriends a variety of characters in the guise of a humble pioneer and single pregnant mother. Context clues finally lead Sadie to realize that several of her in-game friends, including her in-game wife, are Sam playing under alternate user IDs. Sadie confronts Sam, who admits he programmed the entire game for her, and that it would be a way for them to heal together. Sam asks Sadie to work on a sixth game in their partnership, and an angry Sadie cuts off contact with Sam.

In 2008, Sadie has dinner with Dov, who tells her that only someone who truly loved her could have done what Sam did. Sadie forgives Sam and the two reunite, selling the rights to make Ichigo 3 to a third-party developer so they don't have to dwell on the past. Realizing that making games with Sam is one of the only things that's made her truly happy, the two begin planning Unfair's next game.

== Background ==
Zevin began working on the novel at the end of 2017 and wrote the majority of it in 2020 during the outbreak of the COVID-19 pandemic. Having attended Harvard University during the 1990s, and lived in Los Angeles, Zevin's portrayal of Cambridge and Los Angeles are largely based on her own experiences. In deciding to write about video game developers, Zevin was inspired by early generations of gamers, referred to as the "Oregon Trail Generation," and how exposure to video games since the late 1970s has impacted gamers' expectations for their own lives.

Zevin has credited real-life games and events with inspiring the fictional games portrayed in the novel. Zevin acknowledged that Sadie's fictional game Solution is "a take on Train" in an interview with Wired, though she made it clear that the video game Solution has elements that Train, a board game, does not. In that interview she also commented on how the fictional game Pioneers reflects Zevin's experience playing Stardew Valley. Zevin also took inspiration for the main characters from real-life game designers, including Ken Williams, Roberta Williams, John Carmack, and John Romero.

== Reception ==
The novel received starred reviews from Kirkus Reviews and Publishers Weekly. The book was the second most borrowed adult title through public libraries for 2024 in Denver, and the most borrowed adult title in New York City.

Kirkus said the novel is "[s]ure to enchant even those who have never played a video game in their life". Publishers Weekly called the novel "a one-of-a-kind achievement". In a review for The Washington Post, Ron Charles wrote favorably of the book's moral complexity, and related its Shakespearean title to the generative possibilities inherent in gameplay.

Wired called the novel "utterly absorbing", and The New York Times Book Review referred to it as "delightful and absorbing" and "expansive and entertaining". Paste recommended readers listen to the audiobook to better navigate "the complex, perspective-shifting format". NPR's Maureen Corrigan praised the "big, beautifully written" book for placing a non-romantic relationship at its center, and for taking on the issue of cultural appropriation. In contrast, Sam Brooks gave a negative review writing for The Spinoff, describing the characters as "barely distinct from anybody who has a vague interest in gaming" by the time the novel ends, and criticizing the game industry setting as "an unshapely tote bag, unsuited to carry anything that Zevin has bunged into it."

In March 2023, game designer Brenda Romero told The Washington Post that the fictional game Solution represents a substantial, uncredited appropriation of Romero's own game, Train, and the way "being complicit" was presented by Romero as the theme and purpose of the game is presented as if invented by one of book's protagonists and by extension the book's author. "I have no doubt that Train is the best game I'll probably make," Romero said. "It is the one thing I will have to show for dedicating my life to games. And somebody decided that was just fair game." Todd Doughty, Knopf Doubleday's senior vice president for publicity and communications, was quoted in reply: "Tomorrow, and Tomorrow, and Tomorrow is a work of fiction and when crafting a novel, every author draws from the world around them. As Gabrielle Zevin publicly stated in last year's Wired interview, Brenda Romero's undistributed board game, Train, which Zevin has never played but was aware of, served as one point of inspiration among many for the novel, including books, plays, video games, visual art and locales. The entire world, characters and themes of Tomorrow, and Tomorrow, and Tomorrow are solely Zevin's fictional creation and the only games listed in the author's acknowledgments are video games. Again, Tomorrow, and Tomorrow, and Tomorrow is a novel and not an academic or nonfiction text containing indexes, notes, or works cited. Knopf stands behind Gabrielle Zevin and her work".

== Awards and honors ==
Tomorrow, and Tomorrow, and Tomorrow was a New York Times Best Seller, being listed on its 2022 Notable Books List, and an IndieBound best seller. In July 2022, it was a book club pick for Amerie and Barnes & Noble, as well as an Apple Books best seller for Fiction and Literature. It continued to be an Apple Books best seller in August and was also a Belletrist Book Club pick. Amazon named the novel the best book of 2022, as well as a Goodreads Choice Award winner in Fiction. Indigo and Kirkus also included Tomorrow in their lists of the best books of the year. It was the 2024 selection for Everybody Reads, Multnomah County Library, Oregon. It was ranked as #76 of the 100 best books of the 21st century by The New York Times in 2024.

== Adaptation ==
In 2021, prior to its publication, Paramount Pictures and Temple Hill Entertainment purchased the film rights for Tomorrow, and Tomorrow, and Tomorrow for $2 million. The film will be produced by Marty Bowen, Wyck Godfrey, and Isaac Klausner, with Zevin writing the script and executive producing. In May 2024, Siân Heder was hired as the project's director. In March 2026, Daisy Edgar-Jones was cast as Sadie Green in the lead role. In June 2026, it was announced that the film would be released on November 12, 2027. A month later, Sean Kaufman and Sky Yang joined the cast with Kaufman as Marx Watanabe and Yang as Sam Masur.
