= The Hole We're In =

2010 novel by Gabrielle Zevin

- First edition cover
- Publisher: Grove Press
- Publication date: 2010

The Hole We're In is a 2010 novel by Gabrielle Zevin about a family who are caught in a complex bureaucratic tangle when a credit card company sends New Yorker Vincent Pomeroy bills for a man of the same name who lives in Texas. When Pomeroy insisted he did not incur the charges for the Texan man, the company informs him that their policy requires him to take the other Vincent Pomeroy to court and get a judgement of identity theft. Without an external court judgement, the company has no procedure for eliminating these types of charges. However, the company did have a procedure for having the Texan man's bills sent to the New York address for him to make regular payments.

== Reception ==
A review by "Bookslut" on LitHub calls the novel "...a bit like watching the slowest train wreck imaginable", because you can "...sense the family's impending doom" of the bureaucratic trap they are ensnared in.
