= Love Kicks =

Love Kicks...

EP by Kylee
- Released: March 4, 2009
- Genre: Pop punk
- Length: 24:02
- Label: RX-Records

"Love Kicks..." is an extended play, or EP, by Japanese-American singer Kylee.

== Track listing ==
CD

No.	Title	Writer(s)	Producer(s)	Length
1.	"S.A.U."	Kylee / masasucks		3:16
2.	"You Get Me"	James Dotson	Linus of Hollywood	3:26
3.	"THAT ONE"	Kylee / nature living		4:59
4.	"Not For You" (Natalie Bassingthwaighte cover)	Chris Braide / Ian Wrolden	Chris Braide	3:40
5.	"Empty Handed"	Dwight Baker & James Patrick Messer	Dwight Baker & James Patrick Messer	4:19
6.	"Wherever You Are Tonight"	James Dotson	Linus of Hollywood	4:22

== Music video ==
The music video for "You Get Me" was filmed on January 8, 2009.
