= Polyvision =

Widescreen film format

A triptych scene of Napoléon (1927), showing its two vertical seams.

Polyvision was the name given by the French film critic Émile Vuillermoz to a specialized widescreen film format devised exclusively for the filming and projection of Abel Gance's 1927 film Napoléon, its three-projector format predating Cinerama by 25 years.

Polyvision involved the simultaneous projection of three reels of silent film arrayed in a horizontal row, making for a total aspect ratio of 4:1 (1.3̅3̅×3). Polyvision's extremely wide aspect ratio was the widest aspect ratio yet seen, even though it is technically just three images side by side. In 1955, the Walt Disney Company developed Circle-Vision 360° for use in Disneyland theme parks which used nine 4:3 35 mm projectors to show an image that completely surrounds the viewer.

This configuration is considered to be a similar precursor to Cinerama, which would debut a quarter of a century later; however, it is unlikely that Polyvision was a direct inspiration for later widescreen techniques, as the triptych sequence of Napoléon was cut from the film by its distributors after only a few screenings and was not seen again until Kevin Brownlow compiled his restorations from the 1970s onwards.

== Description ==
A restoration of Napoléon, in which the final section is presented in Polyvision

Three film cameras were stacked vertically to shoot the widescreen compositions which would be viewed across all three sections. Gance also used the three strips to create triptych compositions of panels contrasting or simultaneous action, mirrored sides framing the center strip, and perceptual cross-cutting. In this respect, Polyvision can arguably be said to have inspired split screen compositions as well as in-eye edited experiments such as Mike Figgis's Timecode. Gance was unable to eliminate the problem of the two seams dividing the three panels of film as shown on screen, so he avoided the problem by putting three completely different shots together in some of the Polyvision scenes. When Gance viewed Cinerama many years later, he noticed that the widescreen image was still not seamless, that the problem was not entirely fixed.

Polyvision was only used for the final reel of Napoleon, to create a climactic finale. Filming the whole story in Polyvision was impractical as Gance wished for a number of innovative shots, each requiring greater flexibility than was allowed by three interlocked cameras. When the film was severely re-cut by the distributors very early on during exhibition, the new version only retained the center strip in order to allow projection in standard single-projector cinemas. Brownlow's restored version, first seen on 31 August 1979 at the Telluride Film Festival, in Telluride, Colorado, finishes with a flourish intended by Gance: it uses red and blue tinted film on the left and right panels to create le tricolore—the flag of Napoleon's triumphant army.

Difficulties in mounting a full screening of Napoleon with three simultaneous projectors mean that a true Polyvision presentation is rarely seen, with recent exhibitions of Napoleon using Polyvision having been in December 2004 and November 2013 at the Royal Festival Hall, in December 2009 at Cité de la Musique, and in March 2012 at the Paramount Theatre in Oakland, California.

Gance continued to tinker with the system with Parvo camera designer Andre Debrie for several decades afterward, and by 1956, it evolved into a system called Magirama very similar to the later Cinemiracle format. Magirama used three 35 mm film cameras at Academy format with the two side cameras shooting into mirrors; the projectors then used mirrors in an identical configuration in order to properly reverse the side images. This system was only used on a limited number of shots.

The use of three 4:3 monitors to achieve a single 4:1 image was replicated by arcade game company Taito, and used in the games Darius, Darius II, and The Ninja Warriors. This format would later be used by Atari in the games Buggy Boy and TX-1.

== See also ==
- List of film formats
