= Xam'd: Lost Memories =

Japanese ONA series

- Image from the opening theme sequence

亡念のザムド (Bōnen no Zamudo)
- Genre: Fantasy, Mecha, Romance
- Created by: Bones
- Original net animation
- Directed by: Masayuki Miyaji
- Produced by: Makoto Watanabe; Miho Kawagoe; Ryo Ōyama
- Written by: Megumi Shimazu; Yūichi Nomura
- Music by: Michiru Oshima
- Studio: Bones
- Licensed by: AUS: Madman Entertainment; NA: Sentai Filmworks (expired); UK: Manga Entertainment
- Released: July 16, 2008 – February 3, 2009
- Runtime: 25 minutes (each)
- Episodes: 26
- Manga

Junreisha no Compass
- Written by: Masahiro Kawanabe
- Published by: Kadokawa Shoten
- Magazine: Ace Assault; Shōnen Ace
- Original run: December 9, 2008 – July 26, 2009
- Volumes: 1
- icon

Xam'd: Lost Memories, known in Japan as Xam'd of the Forgotten Memories (亡念のザムド, Bōnen no Zamudo), is an anime series, conceptualized by Bones and co-developed by Sony Computer Entertainment, Aniplex and Bones, which made its debut on Sony's inaugural launch of the PlayStation Network (PSN) video download service at E3 in the United States on July 16, 2008, in Japan on September 24, 2008. Unlike SCE's previous anime series Mars Daybreak, no video game adaptation of the series were ever released.

== Plot ==
Sentan Island exists in a state of dreamlike tranquility, surrounded by the Yuden Sea, cut off from the war between the Northern Government and the Southern Continent Free Zone. Akiyuki Takehara lives on Sentan Island along with his mother Fusa. Despite his mother's strained relationship with his father, Ryuzo, the town doctor, the bond between father and son remains strong.

One day the island's tranquility is shattered, when Akiyuki, along with his best friends Haru and Furuichi, are caught up in an explosion on a school bus by a mysterious pale, white haired girl named Nazuna. The explosion produces a mysterious light which enters Akiyuki's arm and a blue gem appears. With no time to understand what has happened, and a brief exchange between Nazuna and Akiyuki, he is transformed into a creature called Xam'd. As Xam'd, Akiyuki uses his newfound powers to fight off monstrous invading forces to save Haru, only to be stopped by a mysterious girl who offers him a choice: come with her and live, or stay and turn to stone. Accepting her offer, Akiyuki embarks on a journey of discovery that will take him to new lands, and help him understand the connection between himself and the world of Xam'd.

=== Main characters ===
Akiyuki Takehara (竹原 アキユキ, Takehara Akiyuki)
Voiced by: Atsushi Abe (Japanese); Blake Shepard (English)
A high school student with a charismatic and helpful nature, he lives with his mother, who has separated from his father due to marriage problems. He has two close friends, Haru and Furuichi. After a suicide bomber from the religious cult of Ruikonism (ルイコン教, Ruikon-kyō) detonates herself on his school bus, releasing the seven beings in a green egg inside her, they fly off as bright pulsing lights one of which lands on Akiyuki's arm, absorbs itself under his skin, and materializes as a blue gem-like object on his right biceps. As the bomber is dying, she touches his forehead, making first a small red gem appear, then a white and green mask. Within moments, Akiyuki's entire body transforms into an exotic white creature and engages in battle with a humanform weapon (ヒトガタ兵器, hitogata heiki) which attacked the area around the bus shortly after the bombing. Following his successful defeat of the humanform weapon, Akiyuki is subdued by a mysterious woman named Nakiami, who threatens to let him turn to stone if he does not go with her to the airship Zanbani where he must learn to coexist with the being within him. The blue gem-like object on Akiyuki's body, which has now moved to his forearm, is later revealed to be manifested appendage of an endosymbiotic organism referred to within the show as a "hiruko" (ヒルコ). When a hiruko endosymbiont merges with a human, the resulting combined life form is referred to as a "Xam'd" (ザムド（墜夢人）, Zamudo).
Nakiami (ナキアミ)
Voiced by: Yuko Sanpei (Japanese); Luci Christian (English)
A mysterious and fairly unemotional woman, Nakiami makes her first entrance when she jumps in and subdues the enraged Xam'd, turning him to stone and demanding that he come with her and live, or die. Akiyuki accepts, and she knocks him and Haru unconscious with a few small movements. She then takes Akiyuki back to the ship with her, and starts operating on Akiyuki and working with his condition. At first, she needs to continually remind Akiyuki to "keep thinking", as this is the way for him to both improve his symbiotic relationship with his hiruko and to help prevent him from turning to stone. Nakiami is a fairly serious and skilled person, who bears similar face marks to other mysterious characters related to the Xam'd, and seems to have a lot of knowledge and expertise about it. She is a crew member of the airship Zanbani and flies a small jet-like vehicle called a Beat Kayak. It has been noted that her character design and vehicle both share large resemblances to Nausicaä, and it may have been an inspiration for her character. Madam Tenshin has given her the nickname "Cloud Rider". It is mentioned some time in Episode 5 by Ishu Benikawa that Nakiami is not her real name, rather it was just made up by the crew of the Zanbani after hearing her yell to "stop crying" (泣き止め, nakiyame).
Haru Nishimura (西村 ハル, Nishimura Haru)
Voiced by: Fumiko Orikasa (Japanese); Monica Rial (English)
Haru is a fellow high school student and a friend of Akiyuki's, and fairly skilled in martial arts. She is the first to encounter Xam'd on the destroyed bus, and later realises the connection between Xam'd and Akiyuki. After Akiyuki is taken to the Zanbani, Haru corresponds with him via written letters. She later joins the Mainsoul military section in the hopes that it will grant her an opportunity to rendezvous with Akiyuki. Her strong desire to be with Akiyuki places a strain on her friendship with Furuichi. She later reveals to Furuichi that she loves Akiyuki.

=== Sentan Island ===
Furuichi Teraoka (寺岡 フルイチ, Teraoka Furuichi)
Voiced by: Shinnosuke Tachibana (Japanese); David Matranga (English)
Furuichi is a friend of Akiyuki, and like Haru, practices martial arts, although it seems that she is much better than he is. Unlike Akiyuki, Furuichi is slightly more cynical and serious, although he is playful enough to bet with Haru on whether Akiyuki will be late or not. Furuichi joins the Mainsoul military, and demonstrates great skill in fighting Xam'd, whilst his relationship with Haru drifts apart. As a result, the reunion of Akiyuki and Haru is interrupted by him and he declares his intentions of killing Akiyuki, due to his cold indifference over the identities of Xam'd. Furuichi later volunteers to undergo an 'enhancement' program to make himself a better Mainsoul pilot, the result of which, ironically, causes Furuichi to turn into one of the opponents he was training to fight, a Xam'd. Furuichi's hiruko resides within his right thigh. Fueled by his anger and jealousy towards Akiyuki, Furuichi's hiruko causes him to continue to become more grotesque until he is subdued by Akiyuki and turned back to normal by Nakiami. He is captured by the Mainsoul military, but escapes while being transported to the base. Soldiers confront him while he is buying drinks for himself, his "beloved" Haru, and his best friend, perhaps finally accepting and coming to terms with Akiyuki. He then decapitates himself with his Xam'd arm before the soldiers are able to recapture him, saying that he wasn't meant to be.
Midori Nishimura (西村 ミドリ, Nishimura Midori)
Voiced by: Ayumi Fujimura (Japanese); Hilary Haag (English)
Haru's younger sister who, as a result of being struck in an automobile accident two years before, requires a crutch to walk. The car accident also took her mother's life. She is later turned into a humanform.
Fusa Takehara (竹原 フサ, Takehara Fusa)
Voiced by: Risa Hayamizu (Japanese); Kaytha Coker (English)
Akiyuki's mother. A strong-willed woman who cares deeply about her son and her, overworking husband. Although the relationship between husband and wife is strained because of his frequent absence from the household, she continues to at least speak with him for the sake of their child. Upon discovering that her son Akiyuki had gone missing, she strongly resolved to try to find him, regardless of whether or not her husband was compassionate enough to abandon his work to help her. She has a very familiar relationship with Haru, and seems to be able to entrust his well-being to her, when later she was able to confirm that her son is indeed alive.
Ryuzo Takehara (竹原 リュウゾウ, Takehara Ryūzō)
Voiced by: Unshou Ishizuka (Japanese); T. Postlethwaite (English)
Akiyuki's father and Fusa's estranged husband. He's a local doctor for his community and appears to specialize in geriatrics, as he often treats the elderly of the area. He appears to be an unkempt man as he often shows little concern for the cleanliness and appearance of both himself and his clinic. His family often comes to his office to take care of him, such as by doing his cooking and laundry. He was one of the last people to know about the disappearance of his son after the island was attacked, and acts rather despondent vis-à-vis his impotence in keeping his family together. It seems that he has a troubled past as a military researcher who worked on Northern Continent humanform weaponisation projects and now deeply regrets his involvement. He also still has ututu seeds with him that he has not parted with, even after the end of his involvement with the military. The full extent of his involvement in humanform research is not yet known. Using life support, he has been keeping alive the attempted suicide bomber who was responsible for his son being implanted with a hiruko.

=== Zanbani Postal Airship ===
Ishu Benikawa (紅皮 伊舟, Benikawa Ishū)
Voiced by: Yumi Tamai (Japanese); Shelley Calene-Black (English)
The captain of the International Postal Airship Zanbani, she always wears a crop top with diaphanous sleeves and usually ties her hair in a ponytail with a yellow ribbon. She also wears glasses, which she at one point blames on age, and is tall. She is described as being the "sweet, raven haired beauty with glasses" by Ahm despite the fact that she usually makes the off-hand comment that he is ugly, fat, or both. She is strong-willed, independent and usually ends up spending her spare money on weapons and ammo. Half of the time she seems to be drinking and smoking. In disciplining her crew, she has been known to slap them depending on how stupid she thinks their actions were. Although she may have a tough exterior, she does occasionally have a soft spot for her crew.
Raigyo Tsunomata (角股 雷魚, Tsunomata Raigyo)
Voiced by: Keiji Fujiwara (Japanese); Andrew Love (English)
Raigyo recently returned to the ship Zanbani after a two-year journey wandering the world as a photographer and a vagrant. During his two-year journey, he had carried his possessions upon his back covered with a sheet, giving him an almost turtle-like appearance. Like Akiyuki, Raigyo is also a Xam'd, except Raigyo's hiruko resides within his left shoulder. Unlike Akiyuki, Raigyo appears to have greater control over his ability to change between human and Xam'd form and thus, seems to have a better relationship with his own hiruko. He also seems to have enough control that he can prevent himself from turning to stone, a common side effect that occurs in people imbued with hiruko. His Xam'd powers seem to be related with water, as water covers his body during his transformation, giving him the ability to swim fast and create water blades sharp enough to easily cut a humanform in two. His Xam'd form also has amphibian characteristics, like webbed hands. Tenshin-sama has given him the nickname "Wind That Stirs the Water".
Akushiba (アクシバ)
Voiced by: Katsuyuki Konishi (Japanese); Adam Van Wagoner (English)
Akiyuki's roommate aboard the Zanbani, he is proud of the speed he can physically run as a courier. He has a collection of pin-up girl magazines and centerfolds and also has a crush on the only female close to his age on the ship, Nakiami.
Yunbo (ユンボ)
Voiced by: Houko Kuwashima (Japanese); Stephanie Wittels (English)
Responsible for the galley of the Zanbani, she is the mother of Hinokimaru (ヒノキ丸) and acts as a mother for Kobako (コバコ), who also live on the ship. Ishu talks with her at times to either vent her feelings or just ask for another's opinion.
Ahm (アーム, Āmu)
Voiced by: Kenji Hamada (Japanese); Rob Mungle (English)
The pilot of the Zanbani who also operates the main cannon. He tries to act as a father figure for Hinokimaru whose real father died in "the Northern Sector".
Kiselji (キセル爺, Kiseru Jii)
Voiced by: Rokuro Naya (Japanese); Christopher Ayres (English)
Mechanic of the Zanbani who rarely leaves the engine room. He believes that only Raigyo understands his "poetic soul". More than likely, this is because Raigyo brings him the alcohol he prefers.
Madam Tenshin (天心様)
Voiced by: Junko Hori (Japanese); Marcy Bannor (English)
An old sage living aboard the Zanbani, who acts as a guide for Nakiami, Raigyo, and Akiyuki. She rarely leaves her quarters and often keeps both of her eyes closed, occasionally opening one eye when speaking. Her closed eyes are perhaps a medical condition as Raigyo, upon his return, gives her "eye medicine, carefully prepared, taken from the Shitogi Grassland".

== Media ==
=== Anime ===
The series received its television premiere across Japan on MBS, CBC, Tokyo MX and other Japanese broadcast networks from April 2009, featuring new opening and ending theme sequences. Xam'd: Lost Memories spanned a total of 26 episodes. On its launch week, its pilot episode was the most downloaded video on the PlayStation Network at E3. On June 24, 2010, Sentai Filmworks announced that it had sub-licensed the series for home video distribution across North America, where the first half season set was released on DVD and Blu-ray Disc on September 21, 2010. The second set was released on November 9, 2010, on DVD and Blu-ray.

=== Manga ===
The manga adaptation of the series, written by Masahiro Kawanabe, began serialization in Ace Assault and Shōnen Ace since December 9, 2008, after it began release on PSN Japan.

=== Music ===
The score to the series is composed by Michiru Oshima, known for her work on the Godzilla movie franchise and the Fullmetal Alchemist anime series. For both the 2008 PlayStation Network download distribution and the 2009 television broadcast, the Japanese electronic rock band Boom Boom Satellites performed the opening themes while Japanese-American vocalist Kylee made her debut performing the ending themes. For the PSN distribution, the opening was "Shut Up and Explode" from the Boom Boom Satellites' 2007 album Exposed and the ending was "Vacancy". For the syndicated TV broadcasts, the Boom Boom Satellites' 2009 single "Back on My Feet" was used as an opening theme and Kylee's songs "Just Breathe" and "Over U" were used as ending themes. For the TV broadcasts, both the old PSN and new TV themes were used in different combinations, each with different animation sequences.
