= Gabrielle Zevin =

American author and screenwriter (born 1977)

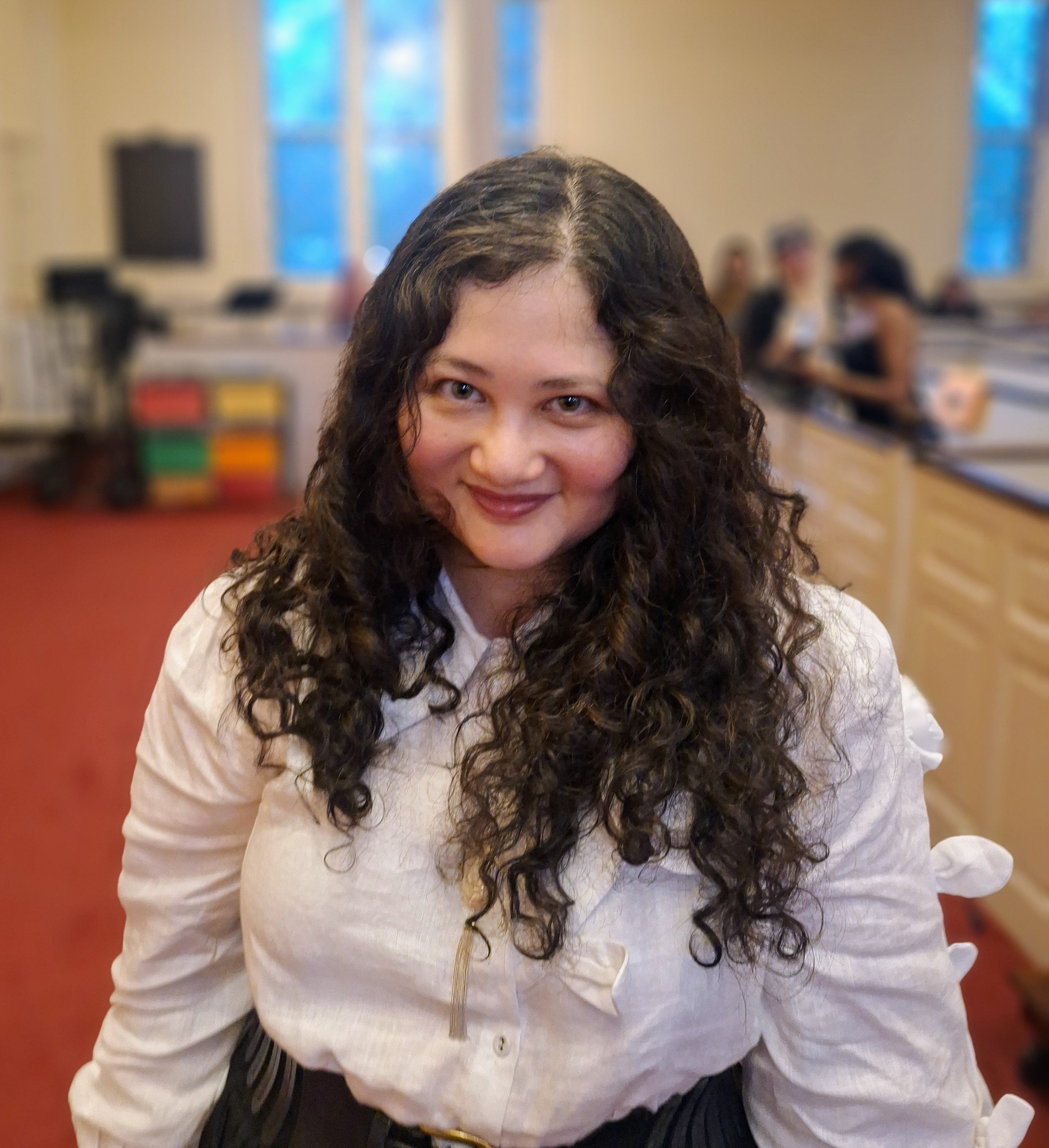
- Zevin in 2024, Cambridge
- Born: Gabrielle Zevin; October 24, 1977 (age 48); New York City, New York, U.S.
- Education: Harvard University
- Occupation: Author
- Partner: Hans Canosa (199?–present)
- Writing career
- Notable works: Elsewhere; The Storied Life of A.J. Fikry; Tomorrow, and Tomorrow, and Tomorrow
- Website: gabriellezevin.com

Gabrielle Zevin (born October 24, 1977) is an American author and screenwriter.

== Early life and education ==
Zevin was born in New York City. Zevin's father, who is American-born, has Russian, Polish and Lithuanian Jewish ancestry. Her mother was born in Korea and immigrated to the United States when she was nine years old. The two met in high school in Connecticut and later worked for IBM.

She grew up in Boca Raton, Florida, and graduated from Spanish River Community High School in 1996. She enrolled at Harvard University, where she studied English with a concentration in American Literature.

== Career ==
=== Novels ===
Zevin's debut novel, Margarettown, published in 2005, was a selection of the Barnes & Noble Discover Great New Writers Program and longlisted for the James Tiptree Jr. Award. In a starred review, Kirkus Reviews called the novel "a droll piece of romantic whimsy with an unexpected resonance."

In 2014, The Storied Life of A. J. Fikry debuted on the New York Times Best Seller List, reached #1 on the National Indie Best Seller List, and went on to become an international bestseller. It has been translated into over thirty languages. In 2021, shooting commenced on a feature film adaptation of the novel, starring Kunal Nayyar in the title role, and Lucy Hale, Christina Hendricks, David Arquette, and Scott Foley. Zevin wrote the screenplay adaptation of her novel.

Her fourth novel for adults, Young Jane Young (2017), was also met with critical acclaim. Kirkus Reviews called it "the best thing to come out of the Monica Lewinsky scandal since Lewinsky's own magnificent TED talk."

Tomorrow, and Tomorrow, and Tomorrow was released in 2022 as Zevin's fifth novel for adults. It won the 2022 Goodreads Choice Award for Best Fiction and came in at seventy-six on the New York Times list of the 100 Best Books of the 21st Century.

=== Other writing ===
Zevin has also written books for young readers. Her first young adult novel, Elsewhere, was published in 2005, three months after her adult debut, Margarettown. It was chosen as an American Library Association Notable Children's Book, nominated for a 2006 Quill award, won the Borders Original Voices Award, and was a selection of the Barnes & Noble Book Club. It also made the Carnegie long list. The book has been translated into over 25 languages.

Zevin's 2007 young adult book Memoirs of a Teenage Amnesiac was chosen for the ALA Best Books for Young Adults list. In 2010, she and Hans Canosa adapted it into a screenplay that became the Japanese movie Dareka ga Watashi ni Kiss wo Shita (Someone Kissed Me), starring top teen idol actress Maki Horikita.

In 2007, Zevin was nominated for an Independent Spirit Award for Best First Screenplay for Conversations with Other Women. The film was directed by Hans Canosa and starred Helena Bonham Carter and Aaron Eckhart.

Zevin has written book reviews for the New York Times Book Review and NPR's All Things Considered.

== Awards and nominations ==
| Award | Year | Category | Recipient(s) | Result | Ref. |
|---|---|---|---|---|---|
| Goodreads Choice Award | 2014 | Fiction | The Storied Life of A.J. Fikry | Nominated | |
| Goodreads Choice Award | 2017 | Fiction | Young Jane Young | Nominated | |
| Goodreads Choice Award | 2022 | Fiction | Tomorrow, and Tomorrow, and Tomorrow | Won | |
| James Tiptree Jr. Award | 2005 | 2005 James Tiptree Jr. Award | Margarettown | Longlisted | |

== Personal life ==
Zevin lived in Manhattan for nearly a decade before moving to Los Angeles in 2012. Her partner is filmmaker Hans Canosa.

== Bibliography ==
=== Novels ===
- Margarettown (2005)
- The Hole We're In (2010)
- The Storied Life of A. J. Fikry (2014)
- Young Jane Young (2017)
- Tomorrow, and Tomorrow, and Tomorrow (2022)

Novels for Young Readers

- Elsewhere (2005)
- Memoirs of a Teenage Amnesiac (2007)

Birthright series:

- All These Things I've Done (2011)
- Because It Is My Blood (2012)
- In the Age of Love and Chocolate (2013)

=== Screenplays ===
- Alma Mater (2002)
- Conversations with Other Women (2005)
- Memoirs of a Teenage Amnesiac (2010)
- The Storied Life of A.J. Fikry (2022)
