= Hans Canosa =

American film director (b. 1970)

- Born: January 10, 1970 (age 56); Holden, Massachusetts, US
- Occupations: Film director Screenwriter; Film editor Film producer
- Known for: Use of split screen effect for the entire film Conversations with Other Women
- Partner: Gabrielle Zevin (199?–present)

Hans Canosa (born January 10, 1970) is an American film director, screenwriter, film editor and producer best known for his independent film Conversations with Other Women (2005), starring Aaron Eckhart and Helena Bonham Carter.

== Early life and education ==
Canosa was born in Holden, Massachusetts, US, where he received a Fundamentalist Christian education from his parents. Because their beliefs did not support films, Canosa did not go to a movie theater until he was 17 years old. It was that day he first saw a film in a theater that Canosa first came up with the idea for a splitscreen film which he used in filming Conversations with Other Women.

Canosa first attended Atlantic Union College, then transferred to Harvard College (class '93). There he directed several plays and videos. While at Harvard, Canosa also met his partner Gabrielle Zevin when she was a cast member in a campus TV show he worked on. Zevin would later go on to write the screenplay for Conversations with Other Women, and for Canosa's 2022 film The Storied Life of A. J. Fikry, adapting her own 2014 international bestseller.

He later entered New York University's graduate film program, but dropped out when he felt it was too restrictive for him.

== Recognition ==
In speaking toward Conversations with Other Women, Film Threat wrote "The story is deceptively simple – and yawningly familiar". And in briefly addressing the plot of a man and woman, lovers when far younger, reuniting at a New York wedding reception over drinks and cigarettes, and rekindling their past attraction now that they are older and wiser, the reviewer praised Canosa by writing "director Hans Canosa transforms this over-used premise into something moving and memorable". The Montreal Gazette noted that Canosa's use of a split screen format, gave "nuance" to what they termed a "brilliant, witty romance", and offered that it "is also one of the few movies that employs technical trickery to its advantage." Contrarily, San Francisco Chronicle while also praising his film, felt that where other directors might use a split screen occasionally, Canosa's use of the effect for the entire film was "distancing, often frustrating and sometimes just plain odd." They added that although the director's use of split screen might have been questionable, "Canosa brings it off with grace and inventiveness".

Toward Canosa's first project, Alma Mater, Film Threat wrote that with the film being set in 1963, it was a "stylistic throwback", but that it captures the era "quite well", in "terms of what the audience sees on the screen and in the way they see it." They felt the director created a 2002 film that felt like it had actually been shot in 1963.

=== Awards and nominations ===
- 2002, won Austin Film Festival 'Audience Award' for 'Best Competition Feature Film' for Alma Mater
- 2002, nominated for Hamptons International Film Festival 'Golden Starfish Award' for 'Best Fiction Feature Film/Video' for Alma Mater
- 2005, won Tokyo International Film Festival 'Special Jury Prize' for Conversations with Other Women
- 2005, nominated for Tokyo International Film Festival 'Tokyo Grand Prix' for Conversations with Other Women
- 2005, nominated for Valladolid International Film Festival 'Golden Spike' for Conversations with Other Women

== Filmography ==
- Alma Mater (2002) – Director, producer, writer
- Conversations with Other Women (2005) – Director, editor
- Memoirs of a Teenage Amnesiac (2010) – Director, producer, editor
- The Storied Life of A.J. Fikry (2022) – Director, producer
