= Memoirs of a Teenage Amnesiac =

- Japanese theatrical release poster
- Kanji: 誰かが私にキスをした
- Literal meaning: Someone kissed me
- Revised Hepburn: Dare ka ga Watashi ni Kisu o Shita
- Directed by: Hans Canosa
- Screenplay by: Gabrielle Zevin
- Based on: Memoirs of a Teenage Amnesiac by Gabrielle Zevin
- Produced by: Kwesi Collisson
- Starring: Maki Horikita; Kenichi Matsuyama; Yuya Tegoshi; Anton Yelchin; Emma Roberts; Mirei Kiritani; Kylee
- Cinematography: Jaron Presant
- Music by: Kylee
- Production companies: Aoi Production; Dot Dot Dot Films
- Distributed by: Toei Company (Japan)
- Release date: 27 March 2010 (Japan)
- Running time: 124 minutes
- Countries: Japan; United States
- Languages: Japanese; English
- Box office: $1.7 million

Memoirs of a Teenage Amnesiac (Japanese: 誰かが私にキスをした, Hepburn: Dare ka ga Watashi ni Kisu o Shita) is a 2010 teen drama film directed by Hans Canosa, based on the 2007 young adult novel of the same name by Gabrielle Zevin. The film stars Maki Horikita, Kenichi Matsuyama, Yuya Tegoshi, and American actor Anton Yelchin.

== Cast ==
- Maki Horikita as Naomi Sukuse
- Yuya Tegoshi as Mirai Hasegawa
- Kenichi Matsuyama as Yuji Miwa
- Anton Yelchin as Ace Zuckerman
- Emma Roberts as Alice Leeds
- Misa Shimizu as Mrs. Hasegawa
- Atsuro Watabe as Goro Sukuse
- Kylee as Winnie
- Reira as Ace's new girlfriend
- Julia Sniegowski as Brianna
- Arthur Rempel as Robert Sutton
- Haruki Kimura as Bailey Plotkin
- Ai Ozaki as Yu Arisa
- Ian Moore as Mr. Weir
- Karen Kirishima as Risa Arisa
- Mirei Kiritani as Yumi
- Yukiko Hattori as Yuji's mother
- David Neale as Dr. Pillar
- Yui Ozaki as Eri Arisa
- Yoriko Kamimura as Ms. Ishibashi
- Michelle Take as Mrs. Tarkington

== Production ==
In November 2008 the film was announced under the title Lost Memories. Filming began on 26 November 2008 and ended in early January 2009.

The film was originally planned to be shot and produced in the United States. However, the production was moved to Japan and the high school setting of the novel was changed to an international school for the film. With this change, the film was able to keep much of the English-language dialogue from the source material.

== Release ==
The film opened in Japan in March 2010 on 247 screens. It was the 10th top earning film its opening weekend.
