= Timecode (2000 film) =

2000 American film by Mike Figgis

- Theatrical release poster
- Directed by: Mike Figgis
- Written by: Mike Figgis
- Produced by: Mike Figgis; Annie Stewart
- Starring: Saffron Burrows; Salma Hayek; Stellan Skarsgård; Jeanne Tripplehorn
- Cinematography: Patrick Alexander Stewart
- Edited by: Mike Figgis
- Music by: Mike Figgis; Anthony Marinelli
- Production companies: Screen Gems; Red Mullet Productions
- Distributed by: Sony Pictures Releasing
- Release date: April 28, 2000
- Running time: 98 minutes
- Country: United States
- Language: English
- Budget: $4 million
- Box office: $1.4 million

Timecode is a 2000 American experimental film written and directed by Mike Figgis and featuring a large ensemble cast, including Salma Hayek, Stellan Skarsgård, Jeanne Tripplehorn, Suzy Nakamura, Kyle MacLachlan, Saffron Burrows, Holly Hunter, Julian Sands, Xander Berkeley, Leslie Mann and Mía Maestro.

The film is constructed from four continuous 98-minute takes that were filmed simultaneously by four cameras; the screen is divided into quarters, and the four shots are shown simultaneously. The film depicts several groups of people in Los Angeles as they interact and conflict while preparing for the shooting of a movie in a production office. The dialogue was largely improvised, and the sound mix of the film is designed so that the most significant of the four sequences on screen dominates the soundtrack at any given moment.

== Plot ==
The film takes place in and around a film production company office, and involves several interweaving plot threads which include a young actress named Rose who tries to score a screen test from her secret boyfriend Alex Green, a noted but disillusioned director. Meanwhile, Rose's tryst with him is discovered by her girlfriend Lauren, an insanely jealous businesswoman who plants a microphone in Rose's purse and spends most of the time in the back of her limousine parked outside the office building listening in on Rose's conversations. Elsewhere, Alex's wife Emma is seen with a therapist debating about asking him for a divorce. In the meantime, numerous film industry types pitch ideas for the next big hit film.

== Cast ==
An illustration of the split-screen technique used throughout Timecode

- Xander Berkeley as Evan Wantz
- Golden Brooks as Onyx Richardson
- Saffron Burrows as Emma Green
- Viveka Davis as Victoria Cohen
- Richard Edson as Lester Moore
- Aimee Graham as Sikh Nurse
- Salma Hayek as Rose
- Glenne Headly as Dava Adair, Therapist
- Andrew Heckler as Auditioning Actor
- Holly Hunter as Renee Fishbine, Executive
- Danny Huston as Randy
- Daphna Kastner as Auditioning Actress
- Patrick Kearney as Drug House Owner
- Elizabeth Low as Penny, Evan's Assistant
- Kyle MacLachlan as Bunny Drysdale
- Mía Maestro as Ana Pauls
- Leslie Mann as Cherine
- Suzy Nakamura as Connie Ling
- Alessandro Nivola as Joey Z
- Zuleikha Robinson as Lester Moore's Assistant
- Julian Sands as Quentin
- Stellan Skarsgård as Alex Green
- Jeanne Tripplehorn as Lauren
- Steven Weber as Darren

In the first run through, Headly's role as Dava Adair was performed by Laurie Metcalf.

== Production ==
The movie was shot with four hand-held digital cameras, in one take, on the sixteenth performance. Largely improvised, Figgis provided the actors with blank, four-staff music manuscript paper, with each octave representing a camera view at that particular moment in time, up to the 93 minutes of camera capacity. The actors themselves personally kept track of the activities occurring in other camera points of view that were relative to their performance.

Rehearsals were single-take performances, filmed over fifteen days. Filmed in the mornings, with the actors fully involved, the footage was reviewed and discussed in the afternoons. Four separate monitors replayed each camera point of view simultaneously. The first rehearsal recording was included as a bonus feature on the film's 2000 DVD release.

The film's action ends with closing activity in three quadrants and the following statement (no capitalization beyond film's title) in the fourth quadrant:

TIME CODE was filmed in
4 continuous takes beginning
at 3:00 pm on friday,
november 19th, 1999.
all of the cast improvised around
a predetermined structure.

== Reception ==
The review aggregator website Rotten Tomatoes gave Timecode a rating of 68% from 81 reviews. The website's consensus reads, "Not much of a story, but the execution is interesting." Metacritic gave the film a score of 65 out of 100, based on 31 critic reviews.

== See also ==
- List of films featuring surveillance
- Minimalist film
