= Divya Dwivedi =

Indian philosopher

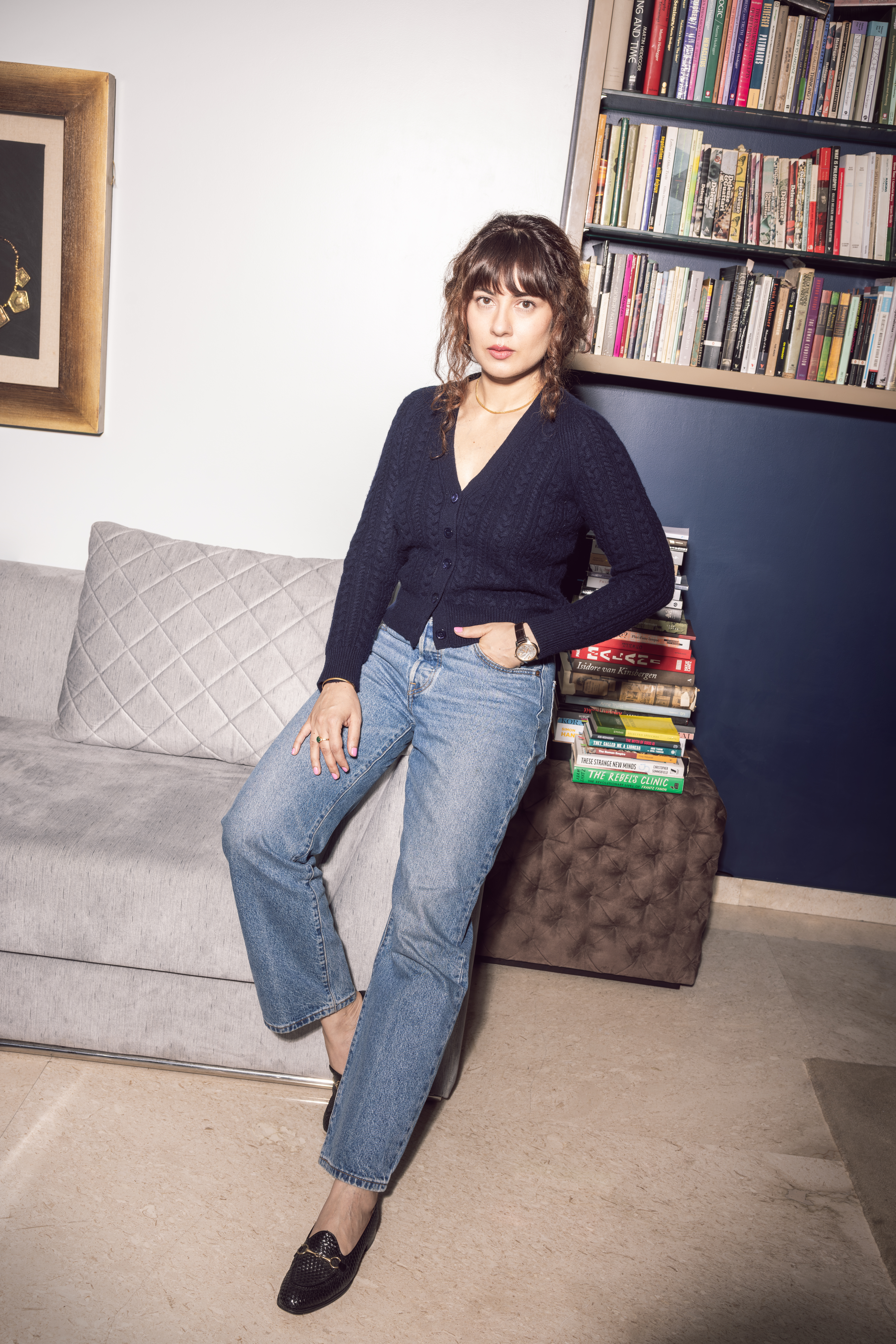
- Portrait of Divya Dwivedi in her study

Education
- Education: Lady Shri Ram College (BA); St. Stephen's College, Delhi (MA); Delhi University (M.Phil); IIT Delhi (PhD)

Philosophical work
- Era: Contemporary philosophy
- School: Deconstruction
- Institutions: Indian Institute of Technology, Delhi; Delhi University; St. Stephen's College, Delhi
- Main interests: Philosophy of literature, aesthetics, philosophy of psychoanalysis, narratology, critical philosophy of caste and race, political thought of Gandhi
- Notable works: Gandhi and Philosophy: On Theological Anti-politics

Divya Dwivedi is an Indian philosopher and author. She is a professor at the Indian Institute of Technology, Delhi. Her work includes a focus on philosophy of literature, aesthetics, philosophy of psychoanalysis, narratology, revolutionary theory, critical philosophy of caste and race, and the political thought of Gandhi. She is the co-author of Gandhi and Philosophy: On Theological Anti-politics and Indian Philosophy, Indian Revolution: On Caste and Politics.

== Early life and education ==
Dwivedi, born in 1981, is originally from Allahabad. Her mother is Sunitha Dwivedi and her father, Rakesh Dwivedi, practices as a senior lawyer for the Supreme Court of India. Dwivedi's paternal grandfather, S. N. Dwivedi was a judge at the Supreme Court of India, and her maternal grandfather Raj Mangal Pande was a minister in the union government of India.

She received her Bachelor of Arts degree from Lady Shri Ram College, Delhi and her Master's degree from St. Stephen's College. She pursued her M.Phil from University of Delhi and received her doctorate from Indian Institute of Technology, Delhi. The works of Jean-Luc Nancy were an influence during her university education.

== Career ==
Dwivedi has taught as an assistant professor at St. Stephen's College, Delhi, and has been adjunct faculty in the English Department at Delhi University and is professor at Department of Humanities & Social Sciences, IIT Delhi. She teaches in the areas of philosophy and literature. She was a visiting scholar at Centre for Fictionality Studies, Aarhus University in 2013 and 2014.

The journal Episteme, produced by Rutgers University, published a special issue on the work of Dwivedi and Shaj Mohan in 2021, including articles by Robert Bernasconi and Marguerite La Caze.

She is a member of the Theory Committee of the International Comparative Literature Association along with Robert J. C. Young, Stefan Willer and others. Dwivedi is a member of the International Network of Women Philosophers. Dwivedi was elected as a member of the executive council of International Society for the Study of Narrative (ISSN) in 2022.

== Philosophical works and views ==
Dwivedi works in the field of the philosophy of literature, the philosophy of psychoanalysis, narratives, the philosophy of criticism, political philosophy, aesthetics, and critical studies on caste and race. Her philosophical work has been described as deconstruction and continental philosophy as well as deconstructive materialism. Her philosophical research projects include a focus on narratology, and her school of thought has been described by scholars such as Étienne Balibar, Slavoj Žižek, Georges Didi-Huberman and Barbara Cassin as developing "within a community of friendship with Jean-Luc Nancy, Bernard Stiegler, Achille Mbembe, and Barbara Cassin."

In an introduction to the December 2017 Women Philosophers' Journal guest-edited by Dwivedi, Barbara Cassin wrote Dwivedi belonging to the Brahmin caste "makes her therefore “untouchable”, in a totally different sense than the dalits, the “untouchables”. Untouchable in a very relative sense, for even in the higher castes the woman intellectual is not worth the man intellectual. She is a philosopher and a literary scholar, English is her mother tongue as much as Hindi, and she found herself compelled to reflect on what postcolonial is, what it serves in the subcontinent, and what it is in the name of."

=== Gandhi and Philosophy: On Theological Anti-politics ===
In 2018, Dwivedi co-authored Gandhi and Philosophy: On Theological Anti-politics with the philosopher Shaj Mohan. The book examines different aspects of Mahatma Gandhi's thought from a new philosophical system. Jean-Luc Nancy wrote the foreword to Gandhi and Philosophy and said that it gives a new orientation to philosophy which is neither metaphysics nor hypophysics.

The Book Review said that the philosophical project of Gandhi and Philosophy is to create new evaluative categories, "the authors, in engaging with Gandhi's thought, create their categories, at once descriptive and evaluative" while pointing to the difficulty given by the rigour of a "seminal if difficult read for those with an appetite for philosophy". Robert Bernasconi writes, "It is a challenging book to read. Familiar words that you think you understand the meaning of are used incongruously and only as you read through the book and come across occurrence after occurrence of these words do you get a new understanding of what that word might now mean. Similarly, they adopt words that seem to be new words, that are certainly new to me, and then slowly as one reads the book one comes to recognise what one can do with language." According to J. Reghu in a review for The Wire, the book "often reads like a thriller, but at times it demands careful attention, which is not surprising since it is an original work in philosophy already recognised by some of the important contemporary philosophers such as Nancy, Stiegler and Bernasconi."

In a review for The Hindu, Tridip Suhrud describes the book as "subversive but deeply affectionate" and writes that the authors, "through their doubt affirm Gandhi as a serious philosopher for our times and beyond." In a review for The Indian Express, Raj Ayyar stated, "Mohan and Dwivedi have done a masterful job of avoiding the binary fork — hagiography or vituperation — as much of Gandhi and hagiography comes from a need to spiritualise Gandhi". Cynthia Chandran, writing for the Deccan Chronicle noted that the "book reveals a materialist, internationalist Gandhiji who develops the ultimate revolutionary political program".

=== Indian Philosophy, Indian Revolution: On Caste and Politics ===
Indian Philosophy, Indian Revolution: On Caste and Politics is a book Divya Dwivedi co-authored with Shaj Mohan, published by Hurst Publishers in the United Kingdom and Westland for India in 2024. It was introduced, edited, and annotated with a philosophical glossary by Maël Montévil who is a theoretical biologist and philosopher of science working at the École normale supérieure, Paris. The book is a collection of essays and interviews that deal with topics including the theoretical basis for caste oppression, Hindu nationalism, philosophy of history and revolution. The Wire wrote that the author royalties from this book in their entirety were transferred in advance to the charities, namely Oxfam UK, Reporters Sans Frontières (Paris) and Equality Labs (USA).

Henrik Schedin said in Parabol Magazine that this book radically transforms the way India and Indian politics are understood. Prerna Vij on Scroll wrote that this book should be considered as part of the canon to transform India because "this book will become essential reading".

The review in Contemporary Political Theory focused on the global implications and the theoretical aspects of Indian Philosophy, Indian Revolution. The complicity of “western academia” in “a new global system of exploitation” is a theme in the book. As per Contemporary Political Theory, “Western academia (not just philosophy) should listen today if it wants to be prepared for tomorrow.” The review in Inverse Journal said that the theory of history in the book show two opposing historiographical styles. One of these is called “ancestral model of historiography” and it is “based on the positing of a hypostatized ‘common ancestor’ as ground of the identity of a people or a culture” which is the basis of racialised histories. It is opposed with “anastatic model of historiography that doesn’t ground common life in a common ancestor. Instead, it bastardizes history. The histories of forms of life are constituted by mixing of people, knowledges, and techniques”.

Lakshmi Subramanian in her review for The Telegraph and other reviewers summarised the political arguments of the book as against “upper caste supremacism” of all kinds. Subramanian wrote that Indian Philosophy, Indian Revolution calls out the construction of Hindu religion in the 20th century by the upper castes of India as a ploy to hide lower caste majority and suppress their desire to come to power. Through the category of Hindu religion “upper caste supremacism that was able to effectively control and dominate subaltern society”. She added that “caste lines permeated all religions in the subcontinent”.

The theoretical framework of the book goes beyond the Indian context as Slavoj Žižek said that it is a “required reading for anyone who wants to understand the precipice toward which our entire world is heading ... a book for everyone who seriously wants to think”. Robert Bernasconi said that the world should “listen and learn” from it since “Not since the days of Sartre has philosophy addressed political issues with the directness and clarity that Dwivedi and Mohan”.

The revolutionary core of the book was noted in a review in The Wire as “committed to the revolutionary anti-caste project” and that its goal is to lead the lower caste majority to political power in all areas of life. Mathrubhumi stated that it was a book of revolutionary theory and is a “call for an unambiguous rise to power in all areas of political and social life from the Dalit-Bahujan majority through an understanding of a revolutionary theory”. The review by Aarushi Punia in Maktoob Media credited the book with producing the concepts and theoretical tools to diagnose caste oppression, to form a majority and it is “imagining a way in which lower castes, who affirmatively form over 90% of the population, can seize power”. The theory of history in the book was described by The Wire as a new model for historiography without recourse to “ancestral models” such as would be the “Aryan doctrine”. Jérôme Lèbre wrote in a long form essay for the French journal AOC Media that the book's concepts and arguments are related to the other works of the authors. It shows the development of concepts and political strategies for theoretically discussing caste oppression side by side.

== Public commentary ==
In addition to her authored and edited books, Dwivedi has written and co-written essays and articles, as well as spoken publicly about her scholarship.

In 2019, Dwivedi participated in a debate on NDTV about Mahatma Gandhi and politics; discussing caste, she described how — in her opinion — in the early 20th century, upper-caste Hindu leaders invented an all-encompassing Hinduism to obfuscate the numerical preponderance of lower caste people in India and construct a false majority. A clip of the video circulated widely, and Dwivedi received threats from the Hindu right. Krithika Varagur, writing for the Los Angeles Review of Books, noted her ideas to be inimical to the essence of Hindu nationalism which posited Hinduism as an eternal and perfect religion, beyond the constraints of history.

In January 2021, Dwivedi co-authored an essay titled "The Hindu Hoax: How upper castes invented a Hindu majority" with Shaj Mohan and academician J Reghu in The Caravan. Dwivedi and her co-authors were subject to fresh threats and harassment on social media; Jean-Luc Nancy wrote a defense of the authors and their article in the Libération, and numerous academics signed a public statement of support for the authors. Rajesh Selvaraj, a professor of Tamil literature, published a translated version of the essay as a book.

Since then, Dwivedi has been consistently targeted by the Hindu Right for her interviews. Other academics and writers have expressed solidarity.

== Selected works ==
=== Books ===
- Indian Philosophy, Indian Revolution: On Caste and Politics, Dwivedi, Divya; Mohan, Shaj; edited and annotated by Montévil, Maël, Hurst Publishers, UK, 2024.
- Mohan, Shaj; Dwivedi, Divya (2018). Gandhi and Philosophy: On Theological Anti-politics. Bloomsbury Academic. ISBN 9781474221733.
- Jean-Luc Nancy, Anastasis de la pensée, Edited by Divya Dwivedi, Jérôme Lèbre, Maël Montévil, and François Warin, introduction by Divya Dwivedi, Jérôme Lèbre and Shaj Mohan, postface Etienne Balibar, Edition Hermann, Paris, 2023.
- Dwivedi, Divya; V, Sanil, eds. (2015). The Public Sphere From Outside the West. Bloomsbury Academic. ISBN 9781472571922.
- Dwivedi, Divya; Skov Nielsen, Henrik; Walsh, Richard, eds. (2018). Narratology and ideology: negotiating context, form, and theory in postcolonial narratives. Columbus: Ohio State University Press. ISBN 9780814213698.
- Dwivedi, Divya, ed. (2022). Virality of Evil: Philosophy in the Time of a Pandemic. Rowman & Littlefield Publishers. ISBN 9781538164709.
- Intellectuals, philosophers, women in India: endangered species, Revue des femmes philosophes, UNESCO, vol / 4-5, 2017.

=== Articles, essays, and interviews ===
- Dwivedi, Divya. 2024. “De-Canonising Theory, Junūn-Ising Canon.” Parallax 30 (3): 312–41, guest edited by Divya Dwivedi and Robert J. C. Young. doi:10.1080/13534645.2024.2476264
- ”Au-delà de l'Europe et du post-colonialisme : psychomachie et psychanalyse”, Collectif de Pantin, 13 December 2025.
- ”Chance in philosophy and science: Beyond ontologies and theologies”, in Figures of Chance: Chance in theory and practice. II. (2024). United Kingdom: Routledge.
- “ India will witness a revolution against caste oppression: Divya Dwivedi”, English version of the interview with Dwivedi published originally as cover story in Mathrubhumi weekly 31 May 2026.
- People Without Exception: An Interview with Divya Dwivedi, (September 2025), Protean Magazine.
- Dwivedi, Divya, 'Remnants of Durban: Towards a Critical Philosophy of Caste and Race', Oxford Intersections: Racism by Context (Oxford, online edition, Oxford Academic, 20 Mar. 2025 - ), https://doi.org/10.1093/9780198945246.003.0022, accessed 29 Oct. 2025.
- Dwivedi, Divya (27 January 2023). "The Evasive Racism of Caste - and the Homological Power of the "Aryan" Doctrine". Critical Philosophy of Race. 11 (1): 209–245. doi:10.5325/critphilrace.11.1.0209. S2CID 257998703.
- “The Psychomachia of Caste and Psychoanalysis in India.” CASTE: A Global Journal on Social Exclusion, vol. 5, no. 2, 2024, pp. 97–120. JSTOR, https://www.jstor.org/stable/48778669. Accessed 14 Apr. 2025.
- Divya, Dwivedi (23 April 2021). "A Mystery of Mysteries!–" (Speech). On the Centennial of Freud's “Massenpsychologie und Ich-analyse”, Jan 2021 - Dec 2021. European Journal of Psychoanalysis.
- Dwivedi, Divya; Mohan, Shaj (21 May 2019). "The Hoax of the Cave". The Wire.
- Dwivedi, Divya; Mohan, Shaj (29 September 2019). "Courage to begin". The Indian Express.
- Baradaran, Kamran; Dwivedi, Divya (3 May 2020). "The proletariat are all those who are denied the collective faculty of imagination; Divya Dwivedi tells ILNA". ILNA. (interview)
- Dwivedi, Divya; Mohan, Shaj; Reghu, J (31 December 2020). "The Hindu Hoax: How upper castes invented a Hindu majority". The Caravan.
- Mohan, Shaj; Dwivedi, Divya (28 February 2021). "The Endogenous Ends of Education (for Aaron Swartz)". European Journal of Psychoanalysis. ISSN 2284-1059.
- Divya Dwivedi (2021). "A Flight Indestinate". In Castrillón, Fernando; Marchevsky, Thomas (eds.). Coronavirus, Psychoanalysis, and Philosophy. Routledge. ISBN 9780367713669.
- Bose, Abhish K; Dwivedi, Divya (18 October 2022). "A French-style revolution alone can help India recover from its current caste stasis, says Prof Dwivedi". Asian Lite International. (interview)
- Dwivedi, Divya; Mohan, Shaj (1 December 2007). "Critical Nation". Economic and Political Weekly. 42 (48).

== See also ==
- History of India (1947–present)
- Hinduism
- Hindu nationalism
- List of women philosophers
- Women in philosophy
