= Shaj Mohan =

Philosopher

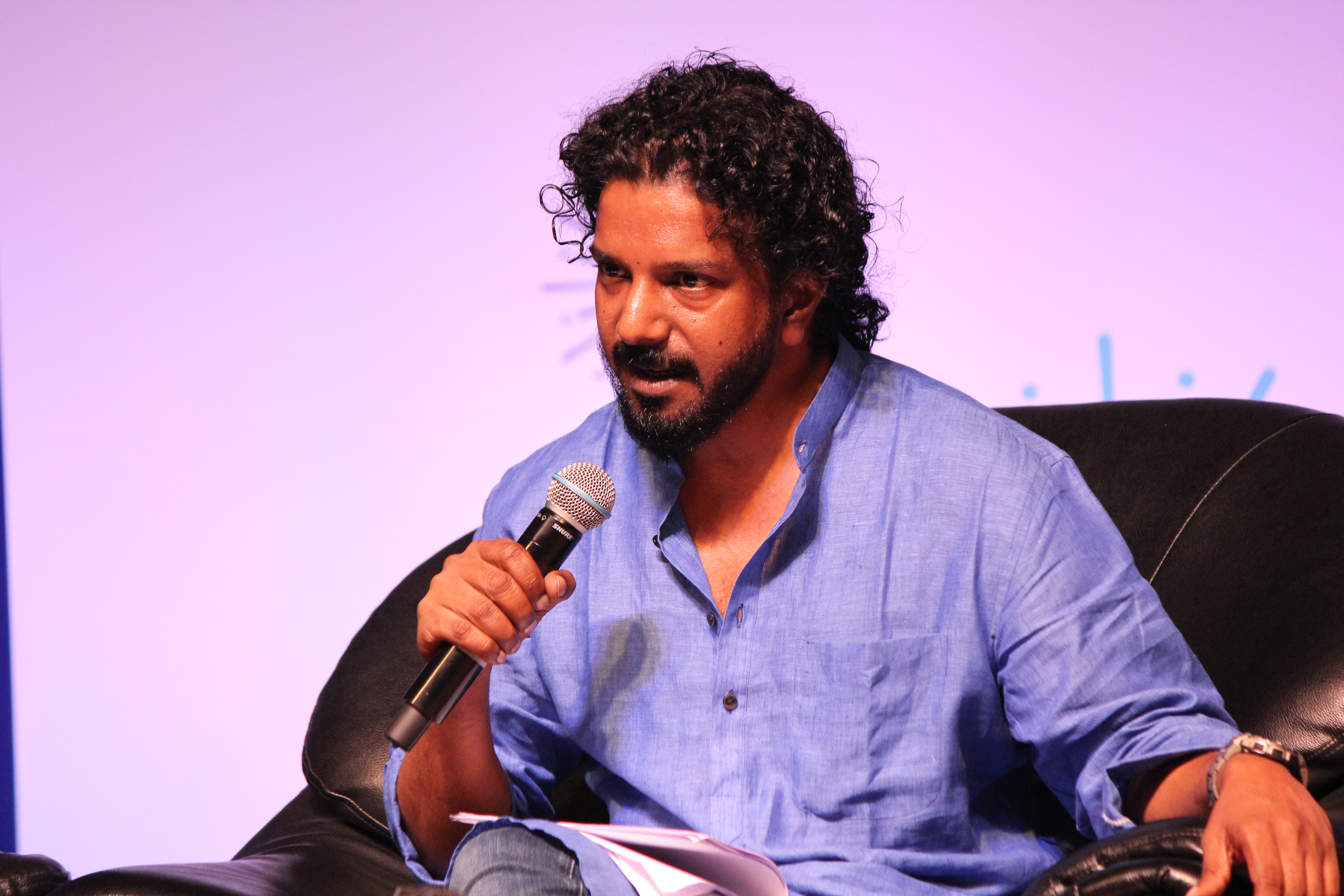
- Shaj Mohan, philosopher

Education
- Education: St. Stephen's College, Delhi

Philosophical work
- Era: Contemporary philosophy
- School: Deconstruction; Post-metaphysics
- Institutions: St Stephen's College, Delhi
- Language: English
- Main interests: Ontology; Metaphysics; Philosophy of technology Philosophy of politics Reason; Anastasis
- Notable ideas: Stasis, anastasis, hypophysics, Comprehending law

Shaj Mohan is an Indian philosopher. His philosophical works are in the areas of metaphysics, reason, philosophy of technology, philosophy of politics, and secrecy. Mohan's works are based on the principle of anastasis according to which philosophy is an ever-present possibility on the basis of a reinterpretation of reason.

== Biography ==
Mohan completed his early education in Thiruvananthapuram, Kerala, and studied philosophy at St. Stephen's College, Delhi where he taught for some time. He has academic degrees in economics and philosophy. Mohan is originally from Tirunelveli. His grandfather Nadaraja Pillai participated in the Indian independence movement with the Indian National Congress.

He has published in the areas of metaphysics, reason, nature, secrecy, philosophy of technology, and philosophy of politics.

He has written philosophical essays against the rise of Hindu nationalism in The Indian Express, Mediapart, Outlook, La Croix, The Wire, The Caravan, Le Monde and Libération. As per Le Monde he has faced difficulties due to his political writings.

In 2021 the American critical theory journal Episteme published a special issue on the philosophy of Mohan and Divya Dwivedi.

== Philosophical work ==
Mohan's work shows a new possibility for philosophy which is neither metaphysics nor deconstruction, and its orientation was described as deconstructive materialism. According to Counter Currents there is “something which can be called a revolutionary theory, but not under that name” in his work.

His work combines the formalism and argumentation of analytic philosophy with the intuitive exegetical style of continental philosophy. Mohan is credited with having "created a new voice in philosophy" resembling the style of prophesy. Mohan said that it is possible to practice philosophy without anchoring it to any tradition. He argued that the principle of reason has an important role in philosophy in spite of the criticisms of it in the 20th century. Reason exceeds mechanical thinking as it has a relation to "the obscure". This rethinking of the principle of reason is made possible through interpreting the philosophical tradition of faculties in a new way. His works are opposed to exceptionalist style of thinking, including state of exception.

Mohan wrote the books Gandhi and Philosophy: On Theological Anti-politics published by Bloomsbury Academic, UK and Indian Philosophy, Indian Revolution: On Caste and Politics published by Hurst Publishers, UK with the philosopher Divya Dwivedi.

Jean-Luc Nancy wrote the foreword to Gandhi and Philosophy and described the originality this work in terms of the relation shown by it between truth and suffering. Nancy wrote that this work creates the new beginning for philosophy following the end of metaphysics,

This is how this book comes to our attention and contributes to orient us, if I may say so, toward a thought, and even a world, neither humanist nor reduced to suffering in the name of Truth. In the terms of this work: neither metaphysics nor hypophysics.

Rachel Adams and Crain Soudien assert that Mohan's "thought is increasingly becoming one of the most radical and important contributions to the philosophy of the world, today".

=== Gandhi and Philosophy: On Theological Anti-politics ===
According to Jean-Luc Nancy Gandhi and Philosophy leads to a new orientation outside of the theological, metaphysical and nihilistic tendencies in philosophy. Bernard Stiegler said that this work "give us to reconsider the history of nihilism in the eschatological contemporaneity and shows its ultimate limits" and offers a new path. Gandhi and Philosophy calls this new beginning the anastasis of philosophy. Robert Bernasconi said that the inventiveness and the constructivism behind the concept of ana-stasis, or the overcoming of stasis, has a relation to the project of re-beginning of philosophy by Heidegger.

Gandhi and Philosophy proposed that parallel to the metaphysical tendency in philosophy there is hypophysics. Hypophysics is defined as "a conception of nature as value". Mohan said "This non-philosophical system, which we call hypophysics, is necessarily interesting for philosophy. " The distance from nature that human beings and natural objects come to have through the effects of technology lessens their value, or brings them closer to evil. Gandhi's concept of passive force or nonviolence is an implication of his hypophysical commitment to nature. Livio Boni in Le collectif de pantin noted that the concept of hypophysics is influenced by Kant. Hypophysics enables a rational reading of Gandhi's works to learn from it without falling into the errors of mysticism.

The philosophical direction outside of metaphysics and hypophysics is created through the invention of a new conceptual order. It is meant to enable philosophy to step outside the regime of sign, signifier, and text. The Book Review said that the philosophical project of Gandhi and Philosophy is to create new evaluative categories, "the authors, in engaging with Gandhi's thought, create their categories, at once descriptive and evaluative" while pointing to the difficulty given by the rigour of a "A seminal if difficult read for those with an appetite for philosophy". Some of the conceptual inventions have been noted to have come from mathematics and biology.

The constructionist tendency of Gandhi and Philosophy places it between the dominant philosophical styles of continental philosophy and analytical philosophy. The conclusion of Gandhi and Philosophy emphasizes the construction of a new dimension in philosophy.

Anastasis is the obscure beginning which would gather the occidental and the oriental to make of them a chrysalis and set off the imagos born with their own spans and skies; these skies and the imagos set against them will refuse to trade in orientations; and these skies will be invisible to the departed souls of Hegel who sought mercury in the darkest nights.

=== Indian Philosophy, Indian Revolution: On Caste and Politics ===
Mohan co-authored the book Indian Philosophy, Indian Revolution: On Caste and Politics with Divya Dwivedi. The book was edited and annotated by Maël Montévil who added a philosophical glossary to the book explaining the philosophical terminology of Dwivedi and Mohan.

The book is an anthology of essays and interviews outlining a revolutionary theory in anti-caste politics. According to the book the caste system is the oldest structured program of racism continuing uninterrupted for 3000 years. It argues that Hindu religion is a 20th century invention by the upper caste leaders of India and British colonial administration, and it serves to suppress the political reality of lower caste people in all religious denominations constituting the real majority population of India. It contains a new theory of history suitable for understanding the lower caste majority position in politics and for theorising politics of equality. Indian Philosophy, Indian Revolution was called “an anti-caste political program or a manifesto only comparable to the little book of Marx and Engels.”

The political points of view, analysis and theories developed in the book are based upon the previously published philosophical works, including on topics such as deconstruction, and the book Gandhi and Philosophy. Philosophers including Slavoj Žižek and Robert Bernasconi, and theorist of literature Robert Young have said that the book has relevance to philosophical reflections on political crisis developing in other parts of the world.

== Reception ==
Jean-Luc Nancy, Robert Bernasconi, Bernard Stiegler and Robert J. C. Young said that his work creates new possibilities for philosophy beyond the impasse of metaphysics and nihilism. American critical theory journal Episteme published a special issue of critical assessments of the philosophy of Mohan and Divya Dwivedi in 2021.

Mohan's work on Gandhi was criticised from the point of view methodological and stylistic difficulty. Robert Bernasconi noted that Gandhi and Philosophy is a difficult book and it is "not a book that you will understand at first reading". The difficulty due to the constructivist style was noted by other authors as well.

Gandhi and Philosophy was criticised from the point of view of the recent mounting criticisms of Gandhi in India and internationally. It was said that Gandhi and Philosophy might be exalting Gandhi while being very critical of him at the same time. The ambiguous approach to Gandhi was described in one of the commentaries in The Indian Express as "Mohan and Dwivedi have done a masterful job of avoiding the binary fork – hagiography or vituperation – as much of Gandhi and hagiography comes from a need to spiritualise Gandhi".

Economic and Political Weekly pointed to Mohan and Dwivedi's participation in the paradigm of "western philosophy", especially when Gandhi's goal was to create an alternative to Eurocentrism. EPW said that his work may be of interest only to continental philosophy as he does not participate in Indic discourses.

== Bibliography ==
Books

- Indian Philosophy, Indian Revolution: On Caste and Politics, Divya Dwivedi and Shaj Mohan, edited and annotated by Maël Montévil, Hurst Publishers, UK, 2024.
- On Bernard Stiegler: Philosopher of Friendship, Ed. Jean-Luc Nancy and Shaj Mohan, Bloomsbury Philosophy, UK, 2024.
- Gandhi and Philosophy: On Theological Anti-politics, Bloomsbury Academic, 2018.

Articles

- “And the Beginning of Philosophy”, Philosophy World Democracy, 2021.
- Deconstruction and Anastasis, Qui Parle (2022) 31 (2): 339–344.
- “Be Held in the Gaze of the Stone”, Philosophy World Democracy, 2022.
- Our Mysterious Being by Jean-Luc Nancy and Shaj Mohan.
- “On the Bastard Family of Deconstruction“, Philosophy World Democracy, 2021. Text of public seminar in École Normale Supérieure on 23 November 2021https://savoirs.ens.fr/expose.php?id=4041
- Teleography and Tendencies: Part 2 History and Anastasis, European Journal of Psychoanalysis, 2022.
- “The Noise of All Things“, Philosophy World Democracy, 2021.
- "«Une Bonne Nuit pour de Longues Promenades »: pour Bernard Stiegler", Amitiés de Bernard Stiegler, réunies par Jean-Luc Nancy, Editions Galilée, 2021.
- L’esperienza oscura in European Journal of Psychoanalysis
- "Nous sommes en état de stase" in France Culture
- „Aber es gibt nichts außerhalb der Philosophie“
- "The Obscure Experience", Coronavirus, Psychoanalysis, and Philosophy, Ed. F. Castrillón, T. Marchevsky, London: Routledge, 2021.
- “On the Relation Between the Obscure, the Cryptic and the Public”, in The Public Sphere From Outside the West, London: Bloomsbury Academic, 2015.
- "What Carries Us On", Coronavirus, Psychoanalysis, and Philosophy, Ed. F. Castrillón, T. Marchevsky, London: Routledge, 2021.

Interviews

- “But, there is nothing outside of philosophy”, Positions Politics.
- Let the World Speak: An Interview with Shaj Mohan, by Anthony Ballas and Kamran Baradaran, Protean Magazine, 2023.
- ‘I take, and I am taken, by what belongs to philosophy’: Philosophy and the redemption of democracy, South African Journal of Science, vol.118 spe 2 Pretoria 2022.
- Une nuit de philosophie (1/4) : Philosopher en Inde Interview with Les Chemins de la philosophie at the UNESCOHeadquarters Paris, available as Podcast.
- Hindu nationalism and why 'being a philosopher in India can get you killed' Interview at Mediapart
