= Gandhi and Philosophy: On Theological Anti-politics =

Book by Divya Dwivedi and Shaj Mohan

- First edition
- Author: Shaj Mohan; Divya Dwivedi
- Language: English
- Genre: Non-fiction
- Publication date: 2018

Gandhi and Philosophy: On Theological Anti-politics is a book written by philosophers Shaj Mohan and Divya Dwivedi. It was published by Bloomsbury Academic, UK. The book is based on analysis of Mahatma Gandhi's philosophy and has received a positive reception.

== Synopsis ==
Gandhi and Philosophy examines different aspects of Mahatma Gandhi's thought from a new philosophical system. Jean-Luc Nancy wrote the foreword to the book and said that it gives a new orientation to philosophy which is neither metaphysics nor hypophysics.

The book proposes that in addition to the metaphysical tendency in philosophy there is a 'hypophysical tendency'; hypophysics is defined as "a conception of nature as value". As per hypophysics the distance from nature that human beings and natural objects come to have through the effects of technology lessens their value, or brings them closer to evil. Gandhi's concept of passive force or nonviolence is an implication of his hypophysical commitment to nature.

The book also identifies racism with caste practices and ascribes a form of racism to Gandhi. In a review of the book in The Indian Express, Aakash Joshi says of the authors, "Perhaps it is because they are not tied to Gandhi's political project - secularism of a particular kind, freedom from colonial concepts, caste without violence - that they are capable of addressing the more uncomfortable aspects of his life and politics."

== Reception ==
Bernard Stiegler admired the work, in that it reconsidered the history of nihilism in the eschatological contemporaneity and criticalised Gandhi's thoughts from a new perspective. Robert Bernasconi admired the profound impact of the work, in that it warranted a re-examination of Gandhiji's thought-school and also served as a reflection on the usual Western interpretations of India. Jean-Luc Nancy wrote the foreword and admired the work, as well.

In Open, Siddharth Singh praised the pioneer attempt at a re-interpretation of Gandhi's thought-school using philosophical models, without being overtly dependent on ex-post-facto political developments. Another review by Aakash Joshi admired the work as well, in that it distanced itself from political correctness and tackled a lot of usually whitewashed controversies in Gandhi's life using novel philosophical concepts, without necessarily delving into a black-and-white territory.

A review by The Book Review noted the work to be a closely argued and seminal volume, which utilized novel philosophical concepts in dissecting and analyzing Gandhi; the development of scalology and hypophysics were praised, in particular. In a review for The Wire, J. Reghu praised the work as a highly original contribution, which ushered in a remarkable moment for classical philosophy in the subcontinent. Cynthia Chandran, writing for the Deccan Chronicle noted that the "book reveals a materialist, internationalist Gandhiji who develops the ultimate revolutionary political program".

In a review for The Hindu, Tridip Suhrud describes the book as "subversive but deeply affectionate" and writes that the authors, "through their doubt affirm Gandhi as a serious philosopher for our times and beyond." In a review for The Indian Express, Raj Ayyar stated, "Mohan and Dwivedi have done a masterful job of avoiding the binary fork — hagiography or vituperation — as much of Gandhi and hagiography comes from a need to spiritualise Gandhi".
