= Mangal Prabhat =

1958 book by Mahatma Gandhi

- Author: Mahatma Gandhi
- Original title: મંગળપ્રભાત
- Language: Gujarati
- Subject: Gandhian philosophy
- Publisher: Navajivan Trust
- Publication date: 1958
- Publication place: India
- ISBN: 9788172290634
- Original text: મંગળપ્રભાત at Gujarati Wikisource

Mangal Prabhat is a book by Mahatma Gandhi. It was published posthumously in 1958 with the preface written by Dattatreya Balkrishna Kalelkar.

== Origin and publication history ==
Gandhi used to deliver a speech on the Ashram vows every Tuesday after prayers. These speeches later compiled by Narandas Gandhi and was published as a book Mangal Prabhat in 1958.

== Summary ==
Mangal Prabhat discusses the eleven vows taken by Gandhi in detail.

== Translation ==
The book was translated into Hindi by Amritlal Thakordas Nanavaty. It was also adapted into verse in Marathi language and was titles Abhang Vraten.
