= Oxford Literary Review =

- Discipline: Literature
- Language: English

Publication details
- Publisher: Edinburgh University Press (United Kingdom)
- Frequency: Biannual

Standard abbreviations
- ISO 4: Oxf. Lit. Rev.

Indexing
- ISSN: 0305-1498

Links
- Journal homepage

Oxford Literary Review is an academic journal of literary theory. The journal was founded in the late 1970s by Ian McLeod, Ann Wordsworth and Robert J. C. Young, and publishes articles on the history and development of deconstructive thinking in intellectual, cultural and political life. Oxford Literary Review has published new work by Jacques Derrida, Maurice Blanchot, Roland Barthes, Michel Foucault, Philippe Lacoue-Labarthe, Jean-Luc Nancy, and Hélène Cixous, and continues to publish new work in the tradition and spirit of deconstruction.

The journal was originally published termly (i.e. three times a year), then bi-annually, though for some years it appeared as a "double issue" as an annual publication. The Oxford Literary Review is now published twice yearly by Edinburgh University Press in July and December. Special issues on specific themes alternate with general issues which include articles from varied intellectual disciplines on issues and writers belonging to or engaging with the work of deconstructive thinking (such as Martin Heidegger, Maurice Blanchot, Emmanuel Levinas, and Luce Irigaray).

== Editors ==
- Geoffrey Bennington, Emory University
- Timothy Clark, University of Durham
- Peggy Kamuf, University of Southern California
- Michael Naas, De Paul University, Chicago
- Nicholas Royle, University of Sussex
- Sarah Wood, University of Kent
