= Eleven vows =

Part of the ethical system prescribed by Mahatma Gandhi

Eleven vows (Ekadash vrat) were part of the ethical system prescribed by Mahatma Gandhi mainly for all those residing in the ashram.

Gandhi insisted on observance of these eleven vows in Ashram.

== The vows ==
A book originally published in Gujarati and later in English titled 'Character And Nation Building' is a summary of 'Ashram observances and constructive programme' discusses these vows. The eleven vows were:

=== Ahimsa (non-violence) ===
The vow of non-killing or love for all. For Gandhi, 'ahinsa' meant universal love, love for the oppressed as well as the oppressor, love for the labourer as well as the landlord.

=== Satya (truth) ===
Truth was paramount for Gandhi. He equated it with God.

=== Asteya (Non-Stealing) ===
Mahatma Gandhi sums up this vow as :

I suggest that we are thieves in a way. If I take anything that I do not need for my own immediate use and keep it, I thieve it from somebody else.

=== Brahmacharya (self-control) ===
Celibacy towards other women and men and even towards one's own partner, seeing him/her as a lifelong friend.

=== Asangraha (renunciation of possession) ===
Gandhi asked for progressive simplication of one's life by renouncing things that one doesn't need.

=== Sharir shram (Bread labour) ===
Gandhi ji writes ::

Man can be saved from injuring society as well as himself only if he sustains his physical existence by physical labour.

=== Asvada (control of the palate) ===
For strict observance of brahmacharya, this vow was found to be important. It meant abstinence from delicacies and feasts etc.

=== Swadeshi (self-reliance) ===
Men can best serve the world by serving his neighbour.

=== Abhaya (fearlessness on all occasions) ===
Fear hinders spiritual progress and therefore observance of this vow was mentioned separately.

=== Asparsh (no untouchability) ===
No one was treated as an untouchable at the Ashram.

== Speech and book ==
In 1915 Gandhi delivered an address to the students at Madras in which he discussed these vows. It was later published as "The Need of India". He would deliver a speech on the Ashram vows every Tuesday after prayers. These speeches were published as a book Mangal Prabhat in 1958.

== See also ==
- Practices and beliefs of Mahatma Gandhi
