= Practices and beliefs of Mahatma Gandhi =

Mahatma Gandhi's statements, letters and life have attracted much political and scholarly analysis of his principles, practices and beliefs, including what influenced him. Some writers present him as a paragon of ethical living and pacifism, while others present him as a more complex, contradictory and evolving character influenced by his culture and circumstances.

== Influences ==
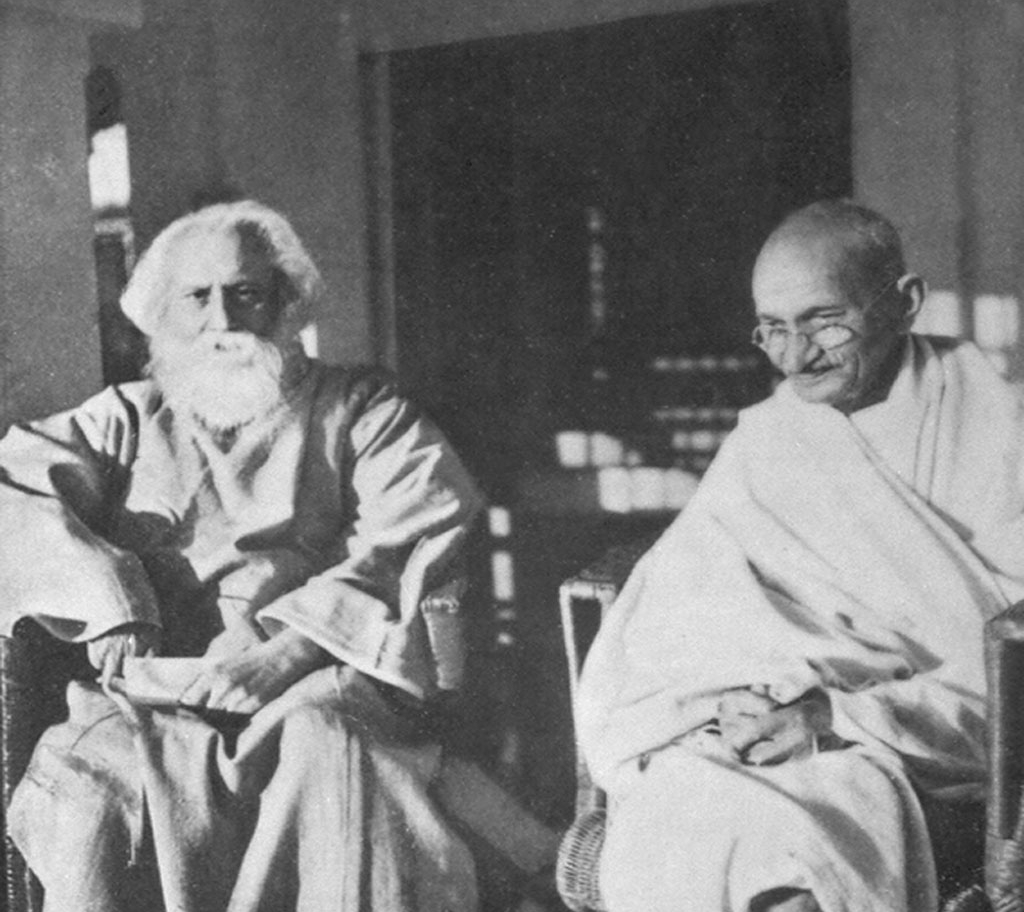
Gandhi with poet Rabindranath Tagore, 1940.

Gandhi grew up in a Hindu and Jain religious atmosphere in his native Gujarat, which were his primary influences, but he was also influenced by his personal reflections and literature of Hindu Bhakti saints, Advaita Vedanta, Islam, Buddhism, Christianity, and thinkers such as Tolstoy, Ruskin and Thoreau. At age 57 he declared himself to be Advaitist Hindu in his religious persuasion, but added that he supported Dvaitist viewpoints and religious pluralism.

Gandhi was influenced by his devout Vaishnava Hindu mother, the regional Hindu temples and saint tradition which co-existed with Jain tradition in Gujarat. Historian R.B. Cribb states that Gandhi's thought evolved over time, with his early ideas becoming the core or scaffolding for his mature philosophy. He committed himself early to truthfulness, temperance, chastity, and vegetarianism.

Gandhi's London lifestyle incorporated the values he had grown up with. When he returned to India in 1891, his outlook was parochial and he could not make a living as a lawyer. This challenged his belief that practicality and morality necessarily coincided. After moving to South Africa in 1893, he found a solution to this problem and developed the central concepts of his mature philosophy.

According to Bhikhu Parekh, three books that influenced Gandhi most in South Africa were William Salter's Ethical Religion (1889); Henry David Thoreau's On the Duty of Civil Disobedience (1849); and Leo Tolstoy's The Kingdom of God Is Within You (1894). The art critic and critic of political economy John Ruskin inspired his decision to live an austere life on a commune, at first on the Phoenix Farm in Natal and then on the Tolstoy Farm just outside Johannesburg, South Africa. His book Sarvodaya (1908) in Gujarati is a translation of Ruskin's Unto This Last which he read on a 24-hour train journey in South Africa. The most profound influence on Gandhi were those from Hinduism, Christianity and Jainism, states Parekh, with his thoughts "in harmony with the classical Indian traditions, specially the Advaita or monistic tradition".

According to Indira Carr and others, Gandhi was influenced by Vaishnavism, Jainism and Advaita Vedanta. Balkrishna Gokhale states that Gandhi was influenced by Hinduism and Jainism, and his studies of Sermon on the Mount of Christianity, Ruskin and Tolstoy.

Additional theories of possible influences on Gandhi have been proposed. For example, in 1935, N. A. Toothi stated that Gandhi was influenced by the reforms and teachings of the Swaminarayan tradition of Hinduism. According to Raymond Williams, Toothi may have overlooked the influence of the Jain community, and adds close parallels do exist in programs of social reform in the Swaminarayan tradition and those of Gandhi, based on "nonviolence, truth-telling, cleanliness, temperance and upliftment of the masses." Historian Howard states the culture of Gujarat influenced Gandhi and his methods.

=== Leo Tolstoy ===
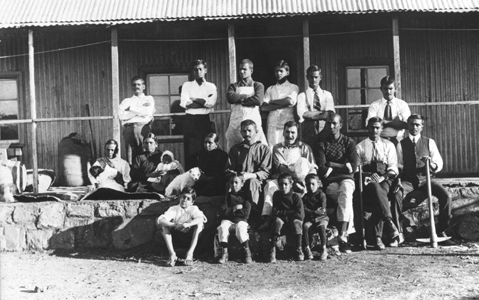
Mohandas K. Gandhi and other residents of Tolstoy Farm, South Africa, 1910

Along with The Kingdom of God Is Within You in 1908, Leo Tolstoy wrote A Letter to a Hindu, which said that only by using love as a weapon through passive resistance could the Indian people overthrow colonial rule. In 1909, Gandhi wrote to Tolstoy seeking advice and permission to republish A Letter to a Hindu in Gujarati. Tolstoy responded and the two continued a correspondence until Tolstoy's death in 1910 (Tolstoy's last letter was to Gandhi). The letters concern practical and theological applications of nonviolence. Gandhi saw himself a disciple of Tolstoy, for they agreed regarding opposition to state authority and colonialism; both hated violence and preached non-resistance. However, they differed sharply on political strategy. Gandhi called for political involvement; he was a nationalist and was prepared to use nonviolent force. He was also willing to compromise. It was at Tolstoy Farm where Gandhi and Hermann Kallenbach systematically trained their disciples in the philosophy of nonviolence.

=== Shrimad Rajchandra ===
Gandhi credited Shrimad Rajchandra, a poet and Jain philosopher, as his influential counsellor. In Modern Review, June 1930, Gandhi wrote about their first encounter in 1891 at P.J. Mehta's residence in Bombay. He was introduced to Shrimad by Pranjivan Mehta. Gandhi exchanged letters with Rajchandra when he was in South Africa, referring to him as Kavi (literally, "poet"). In 1930, Gandhi wrote, "Such was the man who captivated my heart in religious matters as no other man ever has till now." "I have said elsewhere that in moulding my inner life Tolstoy and Ruskin vied with Kavi. But Kavi's influence was undoubtedly deeper if only because I had come in closest personal touch with him."

Gandhi, in his autobiography, called Rajchandra his "guide and helper" and his "refuge [...] in moments of spiritual crisis". He had advised Gandhi to be patient and to study Hinduism deeply.

=== Religious texts ===
During his stay in South Africa, along with scriptures and philosophical texts of Hinduism and other Indian religions, Gandhi read translated texts of Christianity such as the Bible, and Islam such as the Quran. A Quaker mission in South Africa attempted to convert him to Christianity. Gandhi joined them in their prayers and debated Christian theology with them, but refused conversion stating he did not accept the theology therein or that Christ was the only son of God.

His comparative studies of religions and interaction with scholars, led him to respect all religions as well as become concerned about imperfections in all of them and frequent misinterpretations. Gandhi grew fond of Hinduism, and referred to the Bhagavad Gita as his spiritual dictionary and greatest single influence on his life. Later, Gandhi translated the Gita into Gujarati in 1930.

==== Sufism ====
Gandhi was acquainted with Sufi Islam's Chishti Order during his stay in South Africa. He attended Khanqah gatherings there at Riverside. According to Margaret Chatterjee, Gandhi as a Vaishnava Hindu shared values such as humility, devotion and brotherhood for the poor that is also found in Sufism. Winston Churchill also compared Gandhi to a Sufi fakir.

== Gandhi on war ==
Gandhi participated in forming the Indian Ambulance Corps in the South African war against the Boers, on the British side in 1899. Both the Dutch settlers called Boers and the imperial British at that time discriminated against the coloured races they considered as inferior, and Gandhi later wrote about his conflicted beliefs during the Boer war. He stated that "when the war was declared, my personal sympathies were all with the Boers, but my loyalty to the British rule drove me to participation with the British in that war. I felt that, if I demanded rights as a British citizen, it was also my duty, as such to participate in the defence of the British Empire, so I collected together as many comrades as possible, and with very great difficulty got their services accepted as an ambulance corps."

During World War I (1914–1918), nearing the age of 50, Gandhi supported the British and its allied forces by recruiting Indians to join the British army, expanding the Indian contingent from about 100,000 to over 1.1 million. He encouraged Indian people to fight on one side of the war in Europe and Africa at the cost of their lives. Pacifists criticised and questioned Gandhi, who defended these practices by stating, according to Sankar Ghose, "it would be madness for me to sever my connection with the society to which I belong". According to Keith Robbins, the recruitment effort was in part motivated by the British promise to reciprocate the help with swaraj (self-government) to Indians after the end of World War I. After the war, the British government offered minor reforms instead, which disappointed Gandhi. He launched his satyagraha movement in 1919. In parallel, Gandhi's fellowmen became sceptical of his pacifist ideas and were inspired by the ideas of nationalism and anti-imperialism.

In a 1920 essay, after the World War I, Gandhi wrote, "where there is only a choice between cowardice and violence, I would advise violence." Rahul Sagar interprets Gandhi's efforts to recruit for the British military during the War, as Gandhi's belief that, at that time, it would demonstrate that Indians were willing to fight. Further, it would also show the British that his fellow Indians were "their subjects by choice rather than out of cowardice." In 1922, Gandhi wrote that abstinence from violence is effective and true forgiveness only when one has the power to punish, not when one decides not to do anything because one is helpless.

After World War II engulfed Britain, Gandhi actively campaigned to oppose any help to the British war effort and any Indian participation in the war by launching Quit India Movement. According to Arthur Herman, Gandhi believed that his campaign would strike a blow to imperialism. The British government responded with mass arrests including that of Gandhi and Congress leaders and killed over 1,000 Indians who participated in this movement. A number of violent attacks were also carried out by the nationalists against the British government. While 2.5 million Indians volunteered and joined on the British side and fought as a part of the Allied forces in Europe, North Africa and various fronts of the World War II, the Quit India Movement played a role in weakening the control over the South Asian region by the British regime and ultimately paved the way for Indian independence.

== Gandhi on nonviolence ==
=== Truth and Satyagraha ===
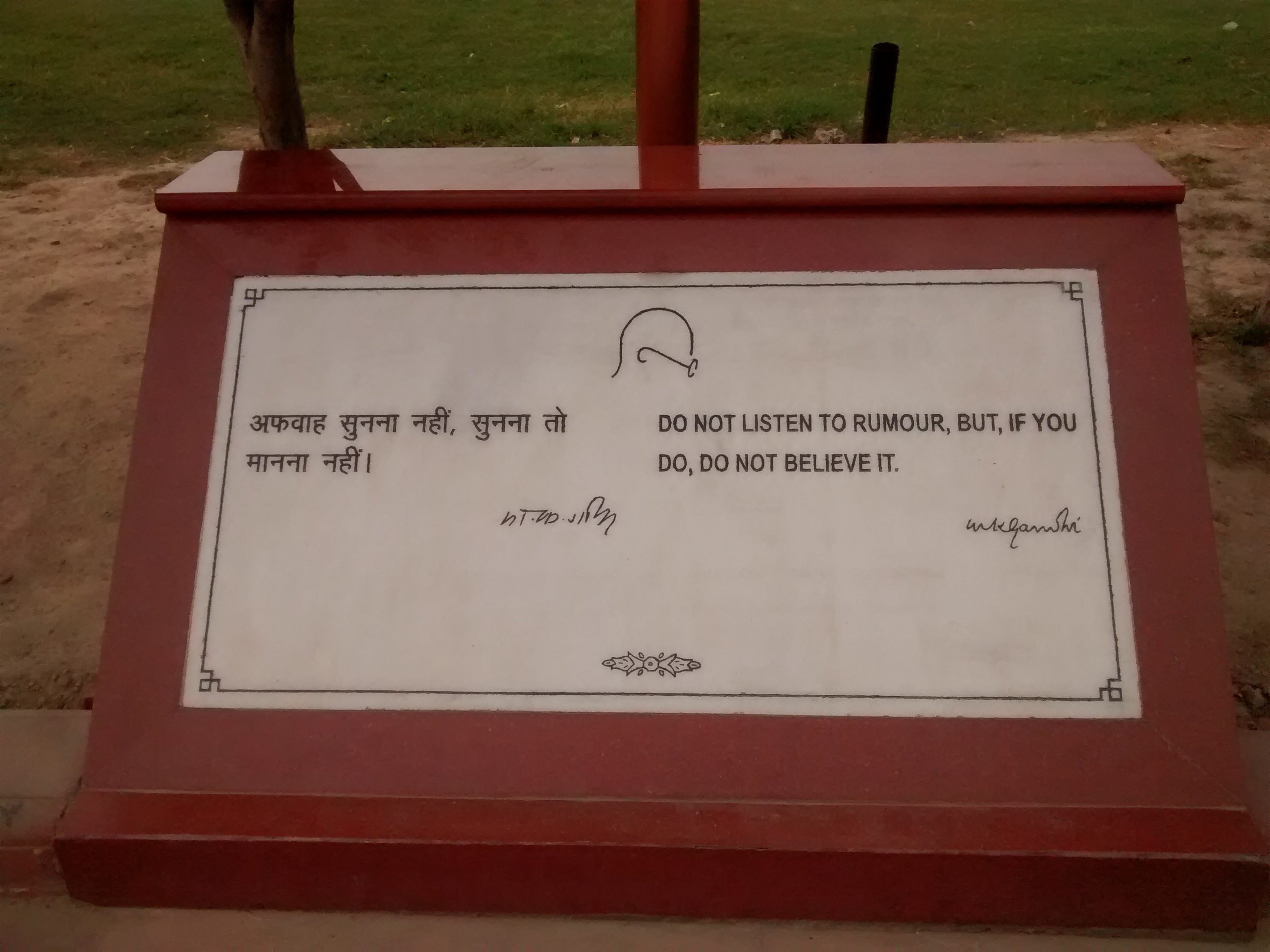
Plaque displaying one of Gandhi's quotes on rumour

Gandhi dedicated his life to discovering and pursuing truth, or Satya, and called his movement satyagraha, which means "appeal to, insistence on, or reliance on the Truth". The first formulation of the satyagraha as a political movement and principle occurred in 1920, which he tabled as "Resolution on Non-cooperation" in September that year before a session of the Indian Congress. It was the satyagraha formulation and step, states Dennis Dalton, that deeply resonated with beliefs and culture of his people, embedded him into the popular consciousness, transforming him quickly into Mahatma.

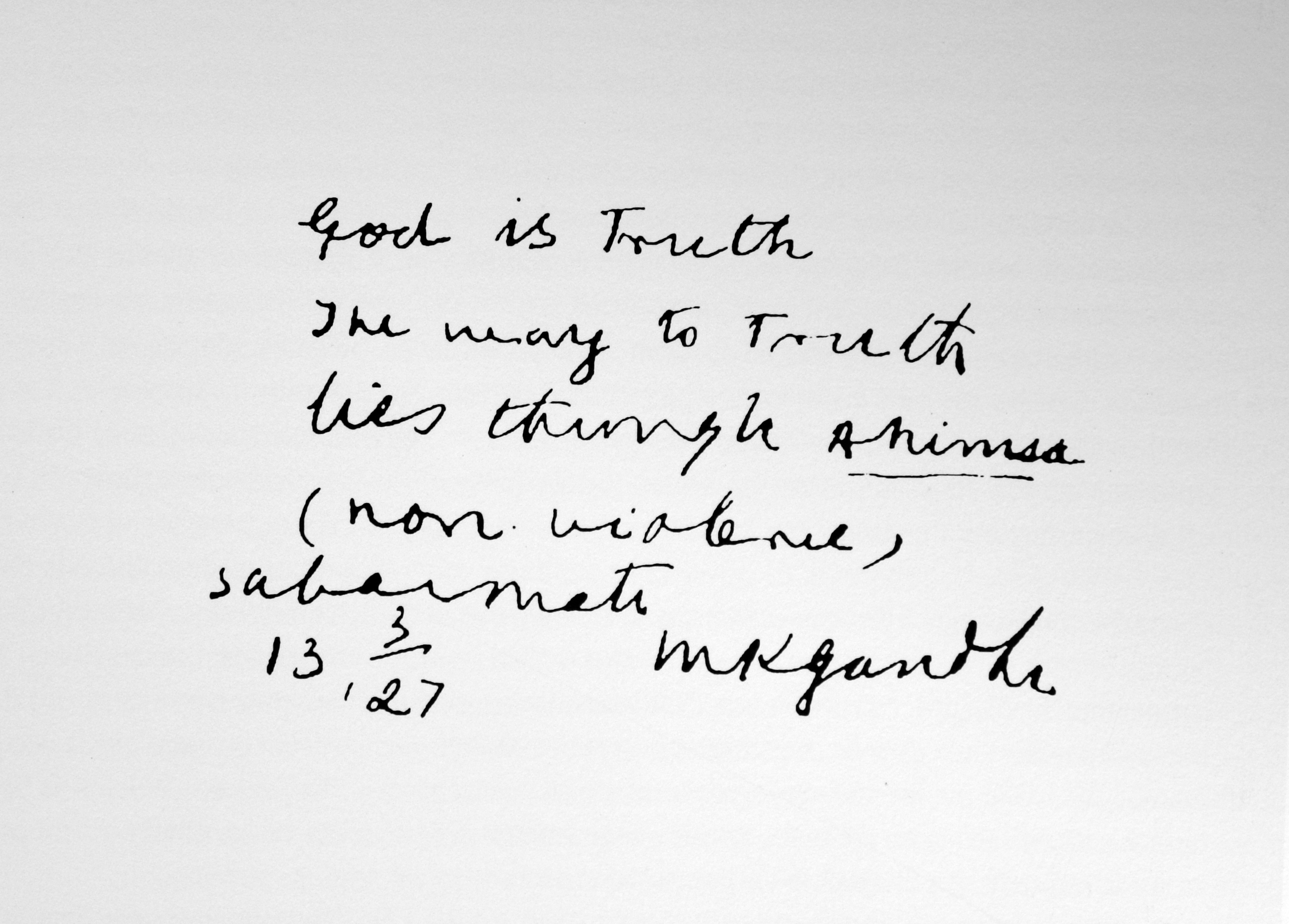
"God is truth. The way to truth lies through ahimsa (nonviolence)" – Sabarmati, 13 March 1927

Gandhi based Satyagraha on the Vedantic ideal of self-realisation, ahimsa (nonviolence), vegetarianism, and universal love. William Borman states that the key to his satyagraha is rooted in the Hindu Upanishadic texts. According to Indira Carr, Gandhi's ideas on ahimsa and satyagraha were founded on the philosophical foundations of Advaita Vedanta. I. Bruce Watson states that some of these ideas are found not only in traditions within Hinduism, but also in Jainism or Buddhism, particularly those about non-violence, vegetarianism and universal love, but Gandhi's synthesis was to politicise these ideas. Gandhi's concept of satya as a civil movement, states Glyn Richards, are best understood in the context of the Hindu terminology of Dharma and Ṛta.

Gandhi stated that the most important battle to fight was overcoming his own demons, fears, and insecurities. Gandhi summarised his beliefs first when he said "God is Truth". He would later change this statement to "Truth is God". Thus, satya (truth) in Gandhi's philosophy is "God". Gandhi, states Richards, described the term "God" not as a separate power, but as the Being (Brahman, Atman) of the Advaita Vedanta tradition, a nondual universal that pervades in all things, in each person and all life. According to Nicholas Gier, this to Gandhi meant the unity of God and humans, that all beings have the same one soul and therefore equality, that atman exists and is same as everything in the universe, ahimsa (non-violence) is the very nature of this atman.

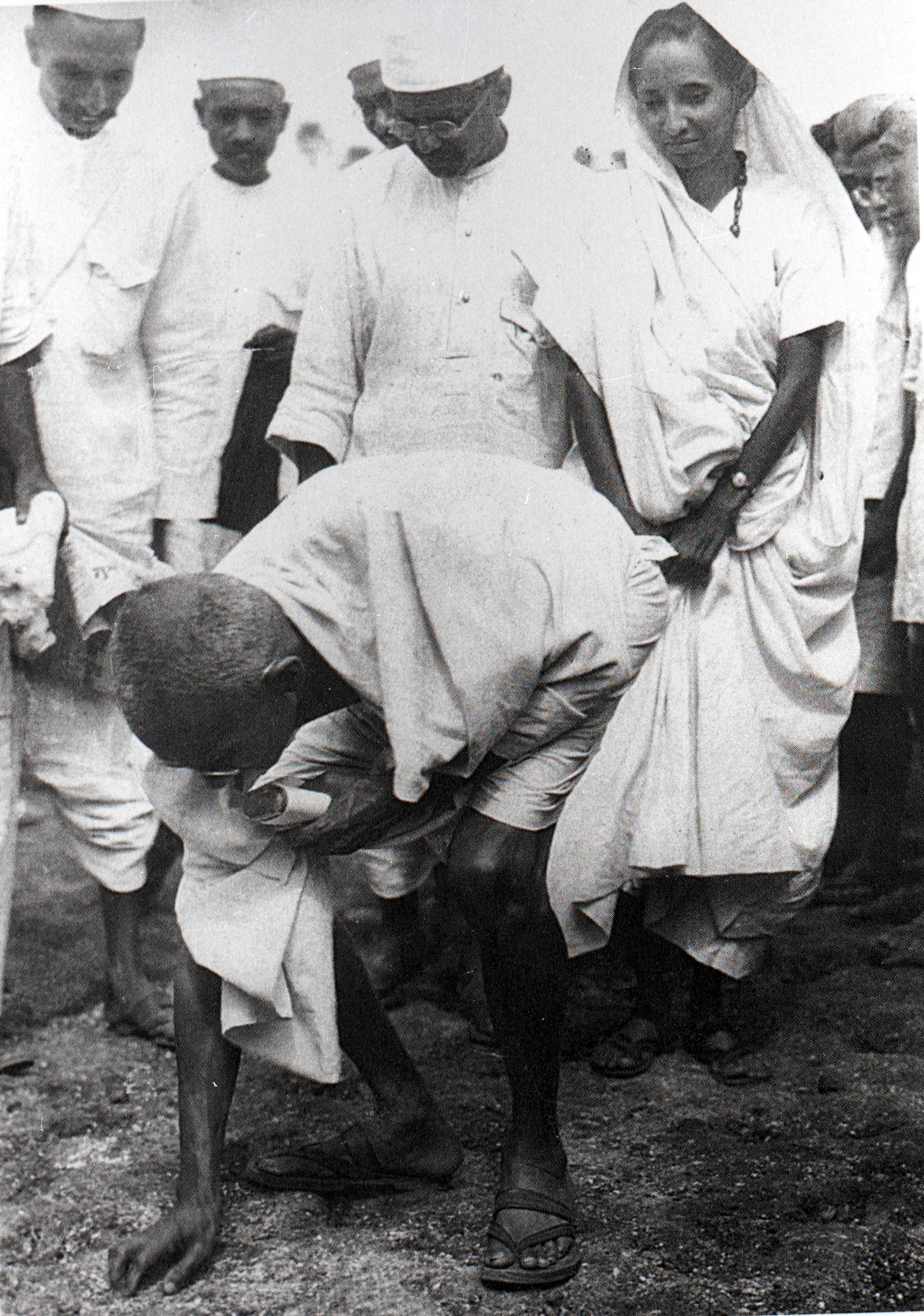
Gandhi picking salt during Salt Satyagraha to defy colonial law giving salt collection monopoly to the British. His satyagraha attracted vast numbers of Indian men and women.

The essence of Satyagraha is "soul force" as a political means, refusing to use brute force against the oppressor, seeking to eliminate antagonisms between the oppressor and the oppressed, aiming to transform or "purify" the oppressor. It is not inaction but determined passive resistance and non-co-operation where, states Arthur Herman, "love conquers hate". A euphemism sometimes used for Satyagraha is that it is a "silent force" or a "soul force" (a term also used by Martin Luther King Jr. during his "I Have a Dream" speech). It arms the individual with moral power rather than physical power. Satyagraha is also termed a "universal force", as it essentially "makes no distinction between kinsmen and strangers, young and old, man and woman, friend and foe."

Gandhi wrote: "There must be no impatience, no barbarity, no insolence, no undue pressure. If we want to cultivate a true spirit of democracy, we cannot afford to be intolerant. Intolerance betrays want of faith in one's cause." Civil disobedience and non-co-operation as practised under Satyagraha are based on the "law of suffering", a doctrine that the endurance of suffering is a means to an end. This end usually implies a moral upliftment or progress of an individual or society. Therefore, non-co-operation in Satyagraha is in fact a means to secure the co-operation of the opponent consistently with truth and justice.

While Gandhi's idea of satyagraha as a political means attracted a widespread following among Indians, the support was not universal. For example, Muslim leaders such as Jinnah opposed the satyagraha idea, accused Gandhi to be reviving Hinduism through political activism, and began effort to counter Gandhi with Muslim nationalism and a demand for Muslim homeland. The untouchability leader Ambedkar, in June 1945, after his decision to convert to Buddhism and the first Law and Justice minister of modern India, dismissed Gandhi's ideas as loved by "blind Hindu devotees", primitive, influenced by spurious brew of Tolstoy and Ruskin, and "there is always some simpleton to preach them". Winston Churchill caricatured Gandhi as a "cunning huckster" seeking selfish gain, an "aspiring dictator", and an "atavistic spokesman of a pagan Hinduism". Churchill stated that the civil disobedience movement spectacle of Gandhi only increased "the danger to which white people there [British India] are exposed".

=== Nonviolence ===
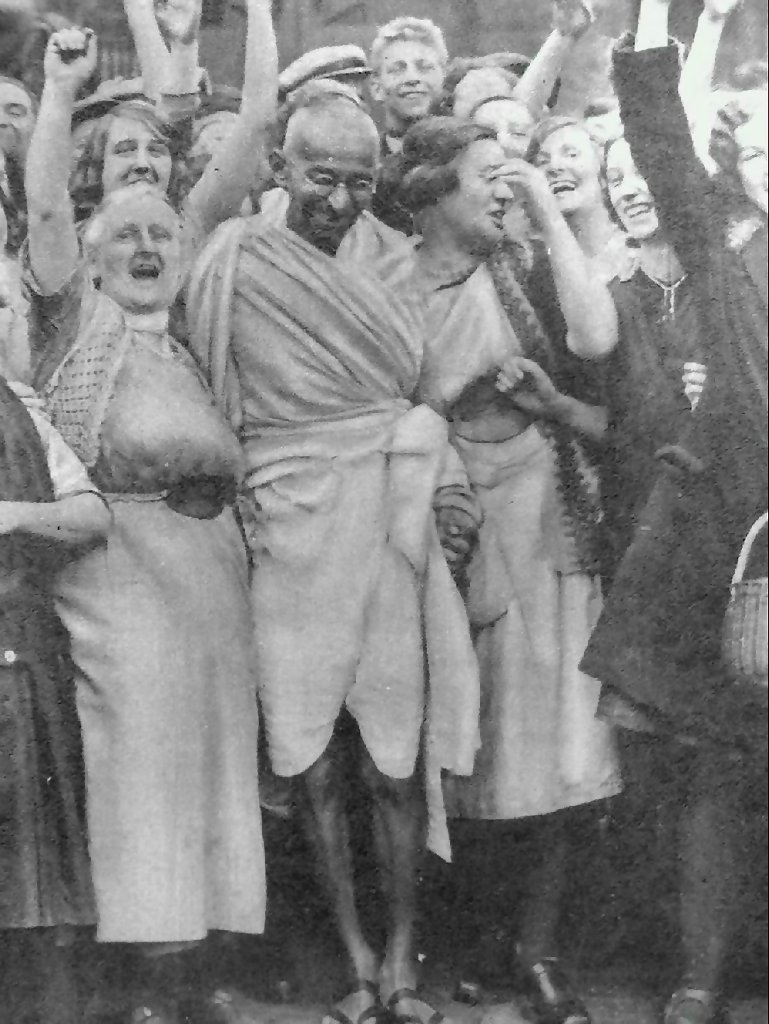
Gandhi with textile workers at Darwen, Lancashire, 26 September 1931

Although Gandhi was not the originator of the principle of nonviolence, he was the first to apply it in the political field on a large scale. The concept of nonviolence (ahimsa) has a long history in Indian religious thought, and is considered the highest dharma (ethical value/virtue), a precept to be observed towards all living beings (sarvbhuta), at all times (sarvada), in all respects (sarvatha), in action, words and thought. Gandhi explains his philosophy and ideas about ahimsa as a political means in his autobiography The Story of My Experiments with Truth.

Gandhi's views came under heavy criticism in Britain when it was under attack from Nazi Germany, and later when the Holocaust was revealed. He told the British people in 1940, "I would like you to lay down the arms you have as being useless for saving you or humanity. You will invite Herr Hitler and Signor Mussolini to take what they want of the countries you call your possessions... If these gentlemen choose to occupy your homes, you will vacate them. If they do not give you free passage out, you will allow yourselves, man, woman, and child, to be slaughtered, but you will refuse to owe allegiance to them." George Orwell remarked that Gandhi's methods confronted "an old-fashioned and rather shaky despotism which treated him in a fairly chivalrous way", not a totalitarian power, "where political opponents simply disappear."

Gandhi believed that violence is not a suitable option when it comes to bringing a change to society but it has to be done with a disciplined and value oriented strategy in form of non-violence. In this regard, he wrote in 1942:

"The revolutionaries are at liberty to reject the whole of my philosophy. To them I merely present my own experiences as a co-worker in the same cause even as I have successfully presented them to the Ali Brothers and many other friends. They can and do applaud whole-heartedly the action of Mustafa Kamal Pasha and possibly De Valera and Lenin. But they realise with me that India is not like Turkey or Ireland or Russia, and that revolutionary activity is suicidal at this stage of the country's life at any rate if not for all time, in a country so vast, so hopelessly divided and with the masses so deeply sunk in pauperism and so fearfully terror-struck."

In a post-war interview in 1946, he said, "Hitler killed five million Jews. It is the greatest crime of our time. But the Jews should have offered themselves to the butcher's knife. They should have thrown themselves into the sea from cliffs... It would have aroused the world and the people of Germany... As it is they succumbed anyway in their millions." Gandhi believed this act of "collective suicide", in response to the Holocaust, "would have been heroism".

Gandhi, in practice, settled for less than complete non-violence. His method of non-violent Satyagraha could easily attract masses and it fitted in with the interests and sentiments of business groups, better-off people and dominant sections of peasantry, who did not want an uncontrolled and violent social revolution which could create losses for them. His doctrine of ahimsa lay at the core of unifying role played by the Gandhian Congress. However, during the Quit India Movement, even many staunch Gandhians used 'violent means'.

== On inter-religious relations ==
=== Buddhists, Jains and Sikhs ===
Gandhi believed that Buddhism, Jainism and Sikhism were traditions of Hinduism, with a shared history, rites and ideas. At other times, he acknowledged that he knew little about Buddhism other than his reading of Edwin Arnold's book on it. Based on that book, he considered Buddhism to be a reform movement and the Buddha to be a Hindu. He stated he knew Jainism much more, and he credited Jains to have profoundly influenced him. Sikhism, to Gandhi, was an integral part of Hinduism, in the form of another reform movement. Sikh and Buddhist leaders disagreed with Gandhi, a disagreement Gandhi respected as a difference of opinion.

=== Muslims ===
Gandhi had generally positive and empathetic views of Islam, and he extensively studied the Quran. He viewed Islam as a faith that proactively promoted peace, and felt that non-violence had a predominant place in the Quran. He also read the Islamic prophet Muhammad's biography, and argued that it was "not the sword that won a place for Islam in those days in the scheme of life. It was the rigid simplicity, the utter self-effacement of the Prophet, the scrupulous regard for pledges, his intense devotion to his friends and followers, his intrepidity, his fearlessness, his absolute trust in God and in his own mission." Gandhi had a large Indian Muslim following, who he encouraged to join him in a mutual nonviolent jihad against the social oppression of their time. Prominent Muslim allies in his nonviolent resistance movement included Maulana Abul Kalam Azad and Abdul Ghaffar Khan. However, Gandhi's empathy towards Islam, and his eager willingness to valorise peaceful Muslim social activists, was viewed by many Hindus as an appeasement of Muslims and later became a leading cause for his assassination at the hands of intolerant Hindu extremists.

While Gandhi expressed mostly positive views of Islam, he did occasionally criticise Muslims. He stated in 1925 that he did not criticise the teachings of the Quran, but he did criticise the interpreters of the Quran. Gandhi believed that numerous interpreters have interpreted it to fit their preconceived notions. He believed Muslims should welcome criticism of the Quran, because "every true scripture only gains from criticism". Gandhi criticised Muslims who "betray intolerance of criticism by a non-Muslim of anything related to Islam", such as the penalty of stoning to death under Islamic law. To Gandhi, Islam had "nothing to fear from criticism even if it be unreasonable". He also believed there were material contradictions between Hinduism and Islam, and he criticised Muslims, along with communists, whom he claimed were quick to resort to violence.

One of the strategies Gandhi adopted was to work with Muslim leaders of pre-partition India, to oppose the British imperialism in and outside the Indian subcontinent. After the First World War, in 1919–22, he won the Muslim leadership support of the Ali Brothers by backing the Khilafat Movement in favour of the Islamic Caliph and his historic Ottoman Caliphate, and opposing the secular Islam-supporting Mustafa Kemal Atatürk. By 1924, Atatürk had ended the Caliphate, the Khilafat Movement was over, and Muslim support for Gandhi had largely evaporated.

In 1925, Gandhi gave another reason for why he had got involved in the Khilafat movement and the Middle East affairs between Britain and the Ottoman Empire. Gandhi explained to his co-religionists (Hindus) that he sympathised and campaigned for the Islamic cause, not because he cared for the Sultan, but because "I wanted to enlist the Mussalman's sympathy in the matter of cow protection". According to the historian M. Naeem Qureshi, like the then Indian Muslim leaders who had combined religion and politics, Gandhi too imported his religion into his political strategy during the Khilafat movement.

In the 1940s, Gandhi pooled ideas with some Muslim leaders who sought religious harmony like him, and opposed the proposed partition of British India into India and Pakistan. For example, his close friend Badshah Khan suggested that they should work towards opening Hindu temples for Muslim prayers, and Islamic mosques for Hindu prayers, to bring the two religious groups closer. Gandhi accepted this and began having Muslim prayers read in Hindu temples to play his part, but was unable to get Hindu prayers read in mosques. The Hindu nationalist groups objected and began confronting Gandhi for this one-sided practice, by shouting and demonstrating inside the Hindu temples, in the last years of his life.

=== Christians ===
Gandhi praised Christianity. He was critical of Christian missionary efforts in British India, because they mixed medical or education assistance with demands that the beneficiary convert to Christianity. According to Gandhi, this was not true "service" but one driven by an ulterior motive of luring people into religious conversion and exploiting the economically or medically desperate. It did not lead to inner transformation or moral advance or to the Christian teaching of "love", but was based on false one-sided criticisms of other religions, when Christian societies faced similar problems in South Africa and Europe. It led to the converted person hating his neighbours and other religions, and divided people rather than bringing them closer in compassion. According to Gandhi, "no religious tradition could claim a monopoly over truth or salvation". Gandhi did not support laws to prohibit missionary activity, but demanded that Christians should first understand the message of Jesus, and then strive to live without stereotyping and misrepresenting other religions. According to Gandhi, the message of Jesus was not to humiliate and imperialistically rule over other people considering them inferior or second class or slaves, but that "when the hungry are fed and peace comes to our individual and collective life, then Christ is born".

Gandhi believed that his long acquaintance with Christianity had made him like it as well as find it imperfect. He asked Christians to stop humiliating his country and his people as heathens, idolators and other abusive language, and to change their negative views of India. He believed that Christians should introspect on the "true meaning of religion" and get a desire to study and learn from Indian religions in the spirit of universal brotherhood. According to Eric Sharpe – a professor of Religious Studies, though Gandhi was born in a Hindu family and later became Hindu by conviction, many Christians in time thought of him as an "exemplary Christian and even as a saint".

Some colonial era Christian preachers and faithfuls considered Gandhi as a saint. Biographers from France and Britain have drawn parallels between Gandhi and Christian saints. Recent scholars question these romantic biographies and state that Gandhi was neither a Christian figure nor mirrored a Christian saint. Gandhi's life is better viewed as exemplifying his belief in the "convergence of various spiritualities" of a Christian and a Hindu, states Michael de Saint-Cheron.

=== Jews ===
According to Kumaraswamy, Gandhi initially supported Arab demands with respect to Palestine. He justified this support by invoking Islam, stating that "non-Muslims cannot acquire sovereign jurisdiction" in Jazirat al-Arab (the Arabian Peninsula). These arguments, states Kumaraswamy, were a part of his political strategy to win Muslim support during the Khilafat movement. In the post-Khilafat period, Gandhi neither negated Jewish demands nor did he use Islamic texts or history to support Muslim claims against Israel. Gandhi's silence after the Khilafat period may represent an evolution in his understanding of the conflicting religious claims over Palestine, according to Kumaraswamy. In 1938, Gandhi spoke in favour of Jewish claims, and in March 1946, he said to the Member of British Parliament Sidney Silverman, "if the Arabs have a claim to Palestine, the Jews have a prior claim", a position very different from his earlier stance.

Gandhi discussed the persecution of the Jews in Germany and the emigration of Jews from Europe to Palestine through his lens of Satyagraha. In 1937, Gandhi discussed Zionism with his close Jewish friend Hermann Kallenbach. He said that Zionism was not the right answer to the problems faced by Jews and instead recommended Satyagraha. Gandhi thought the Zionists in Palestine represented European imperialism and used violence to achieve their goals; he argued that "the Jews should disclaim any intention of realising their aspiration under the protection of arms and should rely wholly on the goodwill of Arabs. No exception can possibly be taken to the natural desire of the Jews to find a home in Palestine. But they must wait for its fulfilment till Arab opinion is ripe for it."

In 1938, Gandhi stated that his "sympathies are all with the Jews. I have known them intimately in South Africa. Some of them became life-long companions." Philosopher Martin Buber was highly critical of Gandhi's approach and in 1939 wrote an open letter to him on the subject. Gandhi reiterated his stance that "the Jews seek to convert the Arab heart", and use "satyagraha in confronting the Arabs" in 1947. According to Simone Panter-Brick, Gandhi's political position on Jewish-Arab conflict evolved over the 1917–1947 period, shifting from a support for the Arab position first, and for the Jewish position in the 1940s.

== On life, society and other application of his ideas ==
=== Vegetarianism, food, and animals ===
Gandhi was brought up as a vegetarian by his devout Hindu mother. The idea of vegetarianism is deeply ingrained in Hindu Vaishnavism and Jain traditions in India, such as in his native Gujarat, where meat is considered as a form of food obtained by violence to animals. Gandhi's rationale for vegetarianism was largely along those found in Hindu and Jain texts. Gandhi believed that any form of food inescapably harms some form of living organism, but one should seek to understand and reduce the violence in what one consumes because "there is essential unity of all life".

Gandhi believed that some life forms are more capable of suffering, and non-violence to him meant not having the intent as well as active efforts to minimise hurt, injury or suffering to all life forms. Gandhi explored food sources that reduced violence to various life forms in the food chain. He believed that slaughtering animals is unnecessary, as other sources of foods are available. He also consulted with vegetarianism campaigners during his lifetime, such as with Henry Stephens Salt. Food to Gandhi was not only a source of sustaining one's body, but a source of his impact on other living beings, and one that affected his mind, character and spiritual well being. He avoided not only meat, but also eggs and milk. Gandhi wrote the book The Moral Basis of Vegetarianism and wrote for the London Vegetarian Society's publication.

Beyond his religious beliefs, Gandhi stated another motivation for his experiments with diet. He attempted to find the most non-violent vegetarian meal that the poorest human could afford, taking meticulous notes on vegetables and fruits, and his observations with his own body and his ashram in Gujarat. He tried fresh and dry fruits (fruitarianism), then just sun dried fruits, before resuming his prior vegetarian diet on advice of his doctor and concerns of his friends. His experiments with food began in the 1890s and continued for several decades. For some of these experiments, Gandhi combined his own ideas with those found on diet in Indian yoga texts. He believed that each vegetarian should experiment with their diet because, in his studies at his ashram he saw "one man's food may be poison for another".

Gandhi championed animal rights in general. Other than making vegetarian choices, he actively campaigned against dissection studies and experimentation on live animals (vivisection) in the name of science and medical studies. He considered it a violence against animals, something that inflicted pain and suffering. He wrote, "Vivisection in my opinion is the blackest of all the blackest crimes that man is at present committing against God and His fair creation."

=== Fasting ===
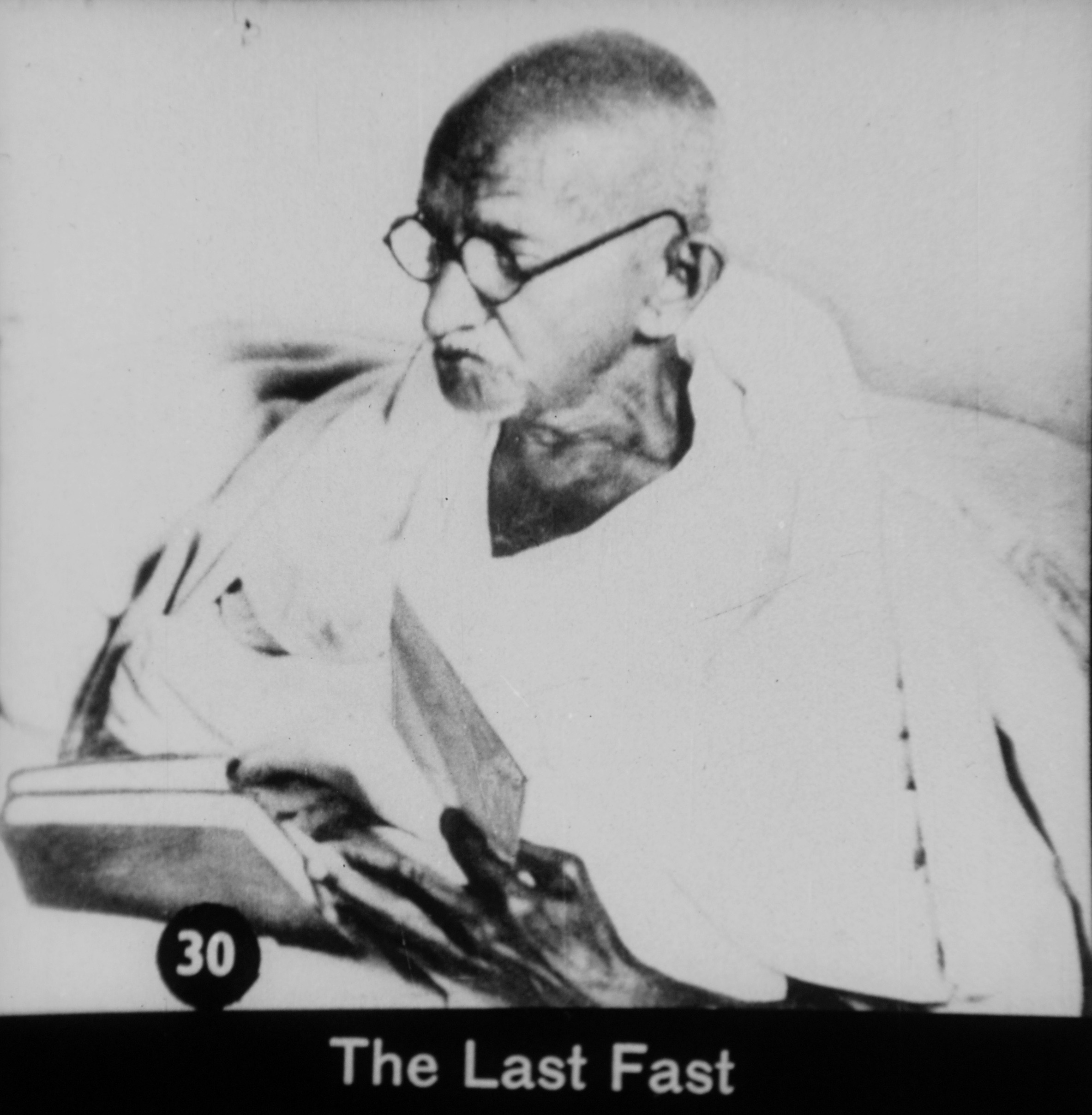
Gandhi's last political protest using fasting, in January 1948

Gandhi used fasting as a political device, often threatening suicide unless demands were met. Congress publicised the fasts as a political action that generated widespread sympathy. In response, the government tried to manipulate news coverage to minimise his challenge to the Raj. He fasted in 1932 to protest the voting scheme for separate political representation for Dalits; Gandhi did not want them segregated. The British government stopped the London press from showing photographs of his emaciated body, because it would elicit sympathy. Gandhi's 1943 hunger strike took place during a two-year prison term for the anti-colonial Quit India movement. The government called on nutritional experts to demystify his action, and again no photos were allowed. However, his final fast in 1948, after the end of British rule in India, his hunger strike was lauded by the British press and this time did include full-length photos.

Alter states that Gandhi's fasting, vegetarianism and diet was more than a political leverage, it was a part of his experiments with self restraint and healthy living. He was "profoundly skeptical of traditional Ayurveda", encouraging it to study the scientific method and adopt its progressive learning approach. Gandhi believed yoga offered health benefits. He believed that a healthy nutritional diet based on regional foods and hygiene were essential to good health. Recently ICMR made Gandhi's health records public in a book 'Gandhi and Health@150'. These records indicate that despite being underweight at 46.7 kg Gandhi was generally healthy. He avoided modern medication and experimented extensively with water and earth healing. While his cardio records show his heart was normal, there were several instances he suffered from ailments like Malaria and was also operated on twice for piles and appendicitis. Despite health challenges, Gandhi was able to walk about 79000 km in his lifetime which comes to an average of 18 km per day and is equivalent to walking around the earth twice.

=== Women ===
Gandhi strongly favoured the emancipation of women, and urged "the women to fight for their own self-development." He opposed purdah, child marriage, dowry and sati. A wife is not a slave of the husband, stated Gandhi, but his comrade, better half, colleague and friend, according to Lyn Norvell. In his own life however, according to Suruchi Thapar-Bjorkert, Gandhi's relationship with his wife were at odds with some of these values.

At various occasions, Gandhi credited his orthodox Hindu mother, and his wife, for first lessons in satyagraha. He used the legends of Hindu goddess Sita to expound women's innate strength, autonomy and "lioness in spirit" whose moral compass can make any demon "as helpless as a goat". To Gandhi, the women of India were an important part of the "swadeshi movement" (Buy Indian), and his goal of decolonising the Indian economy.

Some historians such as Angela Woollacott and Kumari Jayawardena state that even though Gandhi often and publicly expressed his belief in the equality of sexes, yet his vision was one of gender difference and complementarity between them. Women, to Gandhi, should be educated to be better in the domestic realm and educate the next generation. His views on women's rights were less liberal and more similar to puritan-Victorian expectations of women, states Jayawardena, than other Hindu leaders with him who supported economic independence and equal gender rights in all aspects.

=== Brahmacharya: abstinence from sex and food ===
Along with many other texts, Gandhi studied the Bhagavad Gita while in South Africa. This Hindu scripture discusses jnana yoga, bhakti yoga and karma yoga along with virtues such as non-violence, patience, integrity, lack of hypocrisy, self restraint and abstinence. Gandhi began experiments with these, and in 1906 at age 37, although married and a father, he vowed to abstain from sexual relations.

Gandhi's experiment with abstinence went beyond sex, and extended to food. He consulted the Jain scholar Rajchandra, whom he fondly called Raychandbhai. Rajchandra advised him that milk stimulated sexual passion. Gandhi began abstaining from cow's milk in 1912, and did so even when doctors advised him to consume milk. According to Sankar Ghose, Tagore described Gandhi as someone who did not abhor sex or women, but considered sexual life as inconsistent with his moral goals.

Gandhi tested his brahmacharya (celibacy) by carrying out experiments some time after the death of his wife in February 1944. At the start of his experiment, he had women sleep in the same room but in different beds. He later slept with women in the same bed, often naked. In April 1945, Gandhi referenced sleeping with several "women or girls" in a letter to Birla as part of the experiments. According to the 1960s memoir of his grandniece Manu, Gandhi feared in early 1947 that he and she may be killed by Muslims in the run-up to India's independence in August 1947, and asked her when she was 18 years old if she wanted to help him with his experiments to test their "purity", for which she readily accepted. Gandhi also shared his bed with 18-year-old Abha, wife of his grandnephew Kanu. Gandhi would sleep with both Manu and Abha at the same time. Gandhi believed that celibacy is of no value if it hasnt been tested. He stated:

"I want to test, enlarge and revise the current definition of brahmacharya, by which you swear, in the light of my observation, study and experience. Therefore, whenever an opportunity presents itself I do not evade it or run away from it. On the contrary, I deem it my duty - dharma - to meet it squarely in the face and find out where it leads to and where I stand. To avoid the contact of a woman or to run away from it out of fear, I regard as unbecoming of an aspirant after true brahmacharya."

According to Sean Scalmer, Gandhi in his final year of life was an ascetic, and his sickly skeletal figure was caricatured in Western media. In February 1947, he asked his confidants such as Birla and Ramakrishna if it was wrong for him to experiment his brahmacharya oath. Gandhi's public experiments, as they progressed, were widely discussed and criticised by his family members and leading politicians. However, Gandhi said that if he did not let woman sleep with him, it would be a sign of weakness. Some of his staff resigned, including two of his newspaper's editors who had refused to print some of Gandhi's sermons dealing with his experiments. Veena Howard states Gandhi's views on brahmacharya and religious renunciation experiments were a method to confront women's issues in his times. Psychologist Sudhir Kakar views these experiments "wherein the aged Mahatma pathetically sought to reassure himself of the strength of his celibacy".

Gandhi also supported alcohol abstinence, advocating prohibition as the only effective way to deal with alcohol usage.

=== Untouchability and castes ===
Gandhi spoke out against untouchability early in his life. Before 1932, he and his associates used the word antyaja for untouchables. In a major speech on untouchability at Nagpur in 1920, Gandhi called it a great evil in Hindu society but observed that it was not unique to Hinduism, having deeper roots, and stated that Europeans in South Africa treated "all of us, Hindus and Muslims, as untouchables; we may not reside in their midst, nor enjoy the rights which they do". Calling the doctrine of untouchability intolerable, he asserted that the practice could be eradicated, that Hinduism was flexible enough to allow eradication, and that a concerted effort was needed to persuade people of the wrong and to urge them to eradicate it.

According to Christophe Jaffrelot, while Gandhi considered untouchability to be wrong and evil, he believed that caste or class is based on neither inequality nor inferiority. Gandhi believed that individuals should freely intermarry whomever they wish, but that no one should expect everyone to be his friend: every individual, regardless of background, has a right to choose whom he will welcome into his home, whom he will befriend, and whom he will spend time with.

In 1932, Gandhi began a new campaign to improve the lives of the untouchables, whom he began to call harijans, "the children of god". On 8 May 1933, Gandhi began a 21-day fast of self-purification and launched a year-long campaign to help the harijan movement. This campaign was not universally embraced by the Dalit community: Ambedkar and his allies felt Gandhi was being paternalistic and was undermining Dalit political rights. Ambedkar described him as "devious and untrustworthy". He accused Gandhi as someone who wished to retain the caste system. Ambedkar and Gandhi debated their ideas and concerns, each trying to persuade the other. It was during the Harijan tour that he faced the first assassination attempt. While in Poona, a bomb was thrown by an unidentified assailant (described only as a sanatani in the press) at a car belonging to his entourage but Gandhi and his family escaped as they were in the car that was following. Gandhi later declared that he "cannot believe that any sane sanatanist could ever encourage the insane act ... The sorrowful incident has undoubtedly advanced the Harijan cause. It is easy to see that causes prosper by the martyrdom of those who stand for them."

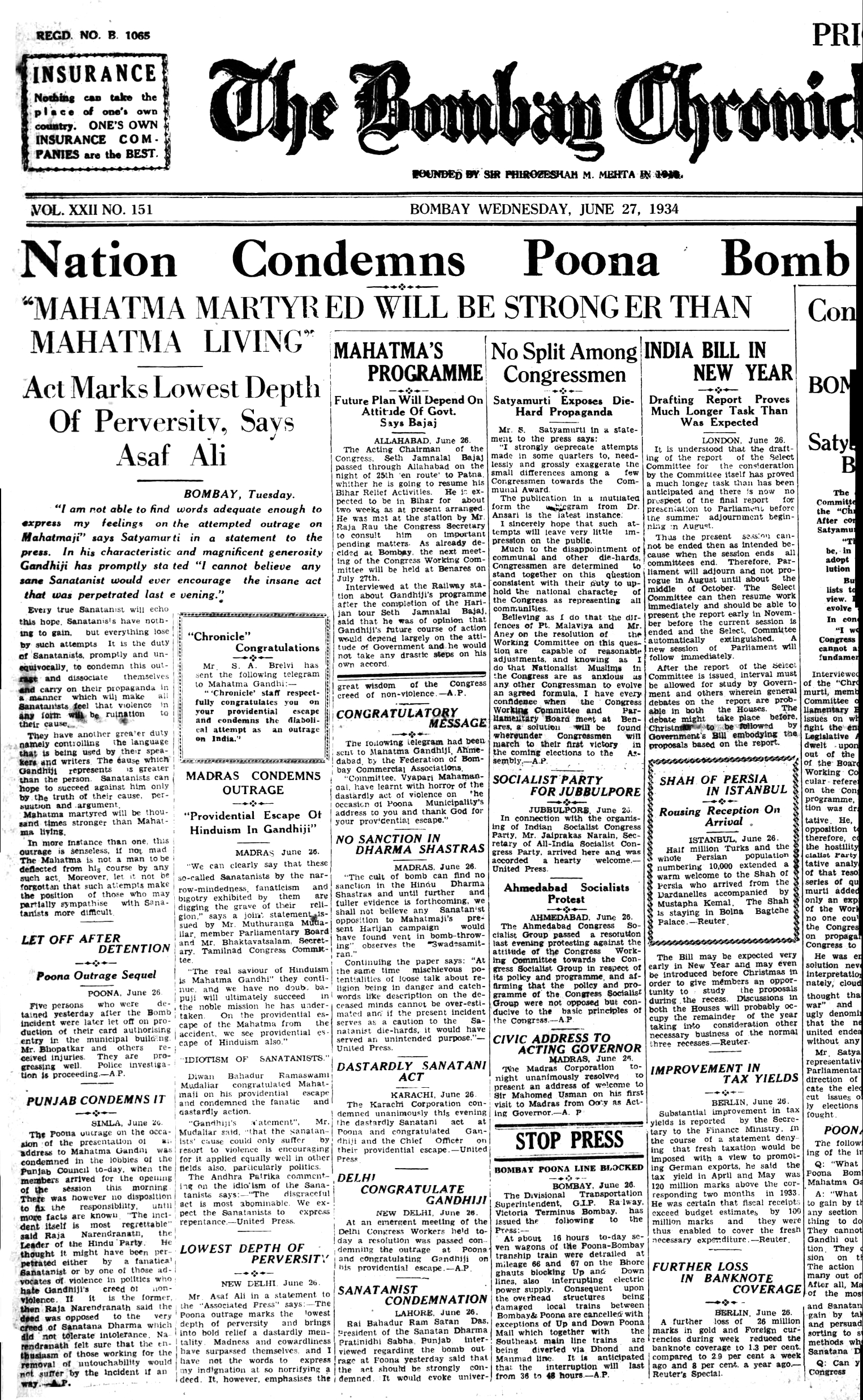
Coverage of the assassination attempt, The Bombay Chronicle, 27 June 1934

In 1935, Ambedkar announced his intentions to leave Hinduism and join Buddhism. According to Sankar Ghose, the announcement shook Gandhi, who reappraised his views and wrote many essays with his views on castes, intermarriage, and what Hinduism says on the subject. These views contrasted with those of Ambedkar. Yet in the elections of 1937, excepting some seats in Mumbai which Ambedkar's party won, India's untouchables voted heavily in favour of Gandhi's campaign and his party, the Congress.

Gandhi and his associates continued to keep in touch with Ambedkar. Ambedkar worked with other Congress leaders through the 1940s and the headed committee of India's constitution in the late 1940s, but did indeed convert to Buddhism in 1956. According to Jaffrelot, Gandhi's views evolved between the 1920s and 1940s; by 1946, he actively encouraged intermarriage between castes. His approach, too, to untouchability differed from Ambedkar's, championing fusion, choice, and free intermixing, while Ambedkar envisioned each segment of society maintaining its group identity, and each group then separately advancing the "politics of equality".

Ambedkar's criticism of Gandhi continued to influence the Dalit movement past Gandhi's death. According to Arthur Herman, Ambedkar's hatred for Gandhi and Gandhi's ideas was so strong that, when he heard of Gandhi's assassination, he remarked after a momentary silence a sense of regret and then added, "My real enemy is gone; thank goodness the eclipse is over now". According to Ramachandra Guha, "ideologues have carried these old rivalries into the present, with the demonization of Gandhi now common among politicians who presume to speak in Ambedkar's name."

=== Nai Talim, basic education ===
Gandhi rejected the colonial Western format of the education system. He stated that it led to disdain for manual work, generally created an elite administrative bureaucracy. Gandhi favoured an education system with far greater emphasis on learning skills in practical and useful work, one that included physical, mental and spiritual studies. His methodology sought to treat all professions equal and pay everyone the same. This leads him to create a university in Ahmedabad, Gujarat Vidyapith.

Gandhi called his ideas Nai Talim (literally, 'new education'). He believed that the Western style education violated and destroyed the indigenous cultures. A different basic education model, he believed, would lead to better self awareness, prepare people to treat all work equally respectable and valued, and lead to a society with less social diseases.

Nai Talim evolved out of his experiences at the Tolstoy Farm in South Africa, and Gandhi attempted to formulate the new system at the Sevagram ashram after 1937. Nehru government's vision of an industrialised, centrally planned economy after 1947 had scant place for Gandhi's village-oriented approach.

In his autobiography, Gandhi wrote that he believed every Hindu child must learn Sanskrit because its historic and spiritual texts are in that language.

=== Swaraj, self-rule ===
Gandhi believed that swaraj not only can be attained with non-violence, but it can also be run with non-violence. A military is unnecessary, because any aggressor can be thrown out using the method of non-violent non-co-operation. While the military is unnecessary in a nation organised under swaraj principle, Gandhi added that a police force is necessary given human nature. However, the state would limit the use of weapons by the police to the minimum, aiming for their use as a restraining force.

According to Gandhi, a non-violent state is like an "ordered anarchy". In a society of mostly non-violent individuals, those who are violent will sooner or later accept discipline or leave the community, stated Gandhi. He emphasised a society where individuals believed more in learning about their duties and responsibilities, not demanded rights and privileges. On returning from South Africa, when Gandhi received a letter asking for his participation in writing a world charter for human rights, he responded saying, "in my experience, it is far more important to have a charter for human duties."

Swaraj to Gandhi did not mean transferring colonial era British power brokering system, favours-driven, bureaucratic, class exploitative structure and mindset into Indian hands. He warned such a transfer would still be English rule, just without the Englishman. "This is not the Swaraj I want", said Gandhi. Tewari states that Gandhi saw democracy as more than a system of government; it meant promoting both individuality and the self-discipline of the community. Democracy meant settling disputes in a nonviolent manner; it required freedom of thought and expression. For Gandhi, democracy was a way of life.

=== Hindu nationalism and revivalism ===
Some scholars state Gandhi supported a religiously diverse India, while others state that the Muslim leaders who championed the partition and creation of a separate Muslim Pakistan considered Gandhi to be Hindu nationalist or revivalist. For example, in his letters to Mohammad Iqbal, Jinnah accused Gandhi to be favouring a Hindu rule and revivalism, that Gandhi-led Indian National Congress was a fascist party.

In an interview with C.F. Andrews, Gandhi stated that if we believe all religions teach the same message of love and peace between all human beings, then there is neither any rationale nor need for proselytisation or attempts to convert people from one religion to another. Gandhi opposed missionary organisations who criticised Indian religions then attempted to convert followers of Indian religions to Islam or Christianity. In Gandhi's view, those who attempt to convert a Hindu, "they must harbour in their breasts the belief that Hinduism is an error" and that their own religion is "the only true religion". Gandhi believed that people who demand religious respect and rights must also show the same respect and grant the same rights to followers of other religions. He stated that spiritual studies must encourage "a Hindu to become a better Hindu, a Mussalman to become a better Mussalman, and a Christian a better Christian."

According to Gandhi, religion is not about what a man believes, it is about how a man lives, how he relates to other people, his conduct towards others, and one's relationship to one's conception of god. It is not important to convert or to join any religion, but it is important to improve one's way of life and conduct by absorbing ideas from any source and any religion, believed Gandhi.

=== Gandhian economics ===
Gandhi believed in the sarvodaya economic model, which literally means "welfare, upliftment of all". This, states Bhatt, was a very different economic model than the socialism model championed and followed by free India by Nehru – India's first prime minister. To both, according to Bhatt, removing poverty and unemployment were the objective, but the Gandhian economic and development approach preferred adapting technology and infrastructure to suit the local situation, in contrast to Nehru's large scale, socialised state owned enterprises.

To Gandhi, the economic philosophy that aims at "greatest good for the greatest number" was fundamentally flawed, and his alternative proposal sarvodaya set its aim at the "greatest good for all". He believed that the best economic system not only cared to lift the "poor, less skilled, of impoverished background" but also empowered to lift the "rich, highly skilled, of capital means and landlords". Violence against any human being, born poor or rich, is wrong, believed Gandhi. He stated that the mandate theory of majoritarian democracy should not be pushed to absurd extremes, individual freedoms should never be denied, and no person should ever be made a social or economic slave to the "resolutions of majorities".

Gandhi challenged Nehru and the modernisers in the late 1930s who called for rapid industrialisation on the Soviet model; Gandhi denounced that as dehumanising and contrary to the needs of the villages where the great majority of the people lived. After Gandhi's assassination, Nehru led India in accordance with his personal socialist convictions. Historian Kuruvilla Pandikattu says "it was Nehru's vision, not Gandhi's, that was eventually preferred by the Indian State."

Gandhi called for ending poverty through improved agriculture and small-scale cottage rural industries. Gandhi's economic thinking disagreed with Marx, according to the political theory scholar and economist Bhikhu Parekh. Gandhi refused to endorse the view that economic forces are best understood as "antagonistic class interests". He argued that no man can degrade or brutalise the other without degrading and brutalising himself and that sustainable economic growth comes from service, not from exploitation. Further, believed Gandhi, in a free nation, victims exist only when they co-operate with their oppressor, and an economic and political system that offered increasing alternatives gave power of choice to the poorest man.

While disagreeing with Nehru about the socialist economic model, Gandhi also critiqued capitalism that was driven by endless wants and a materialistic view of man. This, he believed, created a vicious vested system of materialism at the cost of other human needs, such as spirituality and social relationships. To Gandhi, states Parekh, both communism and capitalism were wrong, in part because both focused exclusively on a materialistic view of man, and because the former deified the state with unlimited power of violence, while the latter deified capital. He believed that a better economic system is one which does not impoverish one's culture and spiritual pursuits.

=== Gandhism ===
Gandhism designates the ideas and principles Gandhi promoted; of central importance is nonviolent resistance. A Gandhian can mean either an individual who follows, or a specific philosophy which is attributed to, Gandhism. M. M. Sankhdher argues that Gandhism is not a systematic position in metaphysics or in political philosophy. Rather, it is a political creed, an economic doctrine, a religious outlook, a moral precept, and especially, a humanitarian world view. It is an effort not to systematise wisdom but to transform society and is based on an undying faith in the goodness of human nature. However Gandhi himself did not approve of the notion of "Gandhism", as he explained in 1936:

There is no such thing as "Gandhism", and I do not want to leave any sect after me. I do not claim to have originated any new principle or doctrine. I have simply tried in my own way to apply the eternal truths to our daily life and problems ... The opinions I have formed and the conclusions I have arrived at are not final. I may change them tomorrow. I have nothing new to teach the world. Truth and nonviolence are as old as the hills.

== Eleven vows ==
Mahatma Gandhi prescribed eleven vows for ashrama inmates and insisted on their observance. These were:

- Ahimsa (non-violence)
- Satya (truth)
- Asteya (Non-Stealing)
- Brahmacharya (self-control)
- Asangraha (Non-possession)
- Sharir shram (body labour)
- Asvada (control of the palate)
- Swadeshi (self-reliance)
- Samanlok (equal respect for all religions)
- Abhaya (fearlessness on all occasions)
- Asparsh (no untouchability)
