= Robert J. C. Young =

English academic

- Born: 1950 (age 75–76); Hertfordshire, England

Philosophical work
- Era: 20th-century philosophy
- Region: Western philosophy
- School: Post-colonial theory, Post-structuralism
- Main interests: History of colonialism · culture · race · ethnicity · Translation · Marxism
- Notable ideas: "anti-colonialism", "colonial desire", "hybridity", "tricontinental"

Robert James Craig Young FBA (born 1950) is a British postcolonial theorist, cultural critic, and historian.

== Life ==
Young was educated at Repton School and Exeter College, Oxford, where he read for a B.A. and D.Phil., taught at the University of Southampton, and then returned to Oxford University where he was Professor of English and Critical Theory and a fellow of Wadham College. In 2005, he moved to New York University where he is Julius Silver Professor of English and Comparative Literature. From 2015 - 2018, he was Dean of Arts & Humanities at NYU Abu Dhabi.

As a graduate student at Oxford, he was one of the founding editors of the Oxford Literary Review, the first British journal devoted to literary and philosophical theory. Young is Editor of Interventions: International Journal of Postcolonial Studies which is published eight times a year. His work has been translated into over twenty languages. In 2013 he was elected a Corresponding Fellow of the British Academy, in 2017 he was elected to an honorary life fellowship at Wadham College, Oxford. Young is currently President of the AILC/ICLA Research Committee on Literary Theory.

== Works ==
Young's work has been described as being 'at least partially instrumental in the radicalisation of postcolonialism'. His first book, White Mythologies: Writing History and the West (1990) argues that Marxist philosophies of history had claimed to be world histories but had really only ever been histories of the West, seen from a Eurocentric—even if anti-capitalist—perspective. Offering a detailed critique of different versions of European Marxist historicism from Lukács to Jameson, Young suggests that a major intervention of postcolonial theory has been to enable different forms of history and historicisation that operate outside the paradigm of Western universal history. While postcolonial theory uses certain concepts from post-structuralism to achieve this, Young argues that post-structuralism itself involved an anti-colonial critique of Western philosophy, pointing to the role played by the experience of the Algerian War of Independence in the lives of many French philosophers of that generation, including Derrida, Cixous, Lyotard, Althusser, and Bourdieu. White Mythologies was the first book to characterise postcolonial theory as a field in itself, and to identify the work of Edward W. Said, Gayatri Chakravorty Spivak, Homi K. Bhabha and the Subaltern Studies historians as its intellectual core.

In Colonial Desire (1995) Young examined the history of the concept of 'hybridity', showing its genealogy through nineteenth-century racial theory and twentieth-century linguistics, prior to its counter-appropriation and transformation into an innovative cultural-political concept by postcolonial theorists in the 1990s. Young demonstrates the extent to which racial theory was always developed in historical, scientific and cultural terms, and argues that this complex formation accounts for the ability of racialised thinking to survive into the modern era despite all the attempts made since 1945 to refute it. The most significant mistake that has been made, he suggests, involves the assumption that race was developed in the nineteenth-century purely as a 'science' which can be challenged on purely scientific grounds.

Having deconstructed 'white Marxism' through the lens of postcolonial theory in White Mythologies, in Postcolonialism: An Historical Introduction (2001), Young charted the genealogy of postcolonial theory in the very different trajectory of Marxism as the major ideological component of twentieth-century anti-colonial struggles. The book provides the first genealogy of the anticolonial thought and practice which form the roots of postcolonialism, tracing the relation of the history of the national liberation movements to the development of postcolonial theory. Stressing the significance of the work of the Third International, as well as Mao Zedong's reorientation of the landless peasant as the revolutionary subject, Young points to the importance of the Havana Tricontinental of 1966 as the first independent coming together of the three continents of the South—Africa, Asia and Latin America—in political solidarity, and argues that this was the moment in which what is now called 'postcolonial theory' was first formally constituted as a specific knowledge-base of non-Western political and cultural production.

In Postcolonialism: A Very Short Introduction (2003) Young links this genealogy of postcolonialism to the contemporary activism of the New Social Movements in non-Western countries. Intended as an introduction to postcolonialism for the general reader, the book is written in a highly accessible style and unorthodox format, mixing history with fiction, cultural analysis with moments of poetic intensity that stage and evoke postcolonial experience rather than merely describe it. Instead of approaching postcolonialism through its often abstract and esoteric theories, the book works entirely out of particular examples. These examples emphasise issues of migration, gender, language, indigenous rights, 'development' and ecology as well as addressing the more usual postcolonial ideas of ambivalence, hybridity, orientalism and subalternity.

In The Idea of English Ethnicity (2008) Young returned to the question of race to address an apparent contradiction—the idea of an English ethnicity. Why does ethnicity not seem to be a category applicable to English people? To answer this question, Young reconsiders the way that English identity was classified in historical and racial terms in the nineteenth century. He argues that what most affected this was the relation of England to Ireland after the Act of Union of 1800–1. Initial attempts at excluding the Irish were followed by a more inclusive idea of Englishness which removed the specificities of race and even place. Englishness, Young suggests, was never really about England at all, but was developed as a broader identity, intended to include not only the Irish (and thus deter Irish nationalism) but also the English diaspora around the world—North Americans, South Africans, Australians and New Zealanders, and even, for some writers, Indians and those from the Caribbean. By the end of the nineteenth century, this had become appropriated as an ideology of empire. The delocalisation of the country England from ideas of Englishness (Kipling's "What do they know of England who only England know?") could account for why recent commentators have found Englishness so hard to define—while at the same time providing an explanation of why some of the most English of Englishmen have been Americans. On the other hand, Young argues, its broad principle of inclusiveness also helps to explain why Britain has been able to transform itself into one of the more integrated, or hybridized, of modern multiethnic nations.

In 2015, together with Jean Khalfa, Young published a 680-page collection of writings by Frantz Fanon, the first new work by Fanon to be published in over 50 years, Écrits sur l’aliénation et la liberté which includes two previously unpublished plays, together with psychiatric and political essays, letters, editorials from the weekly journals at the hospitals at Saint Alban (Trait d'union) and Blida (Notre Journal), as well as a complete list of Fanon's library and his annotations to his books. An English translation by Steven Corcoran was published in 2018 by Bloomsbury Academic Press.

== Selected publications ==
Other books

- Empire, Colony, Postcolony. Oxford and Malden, Mass: Wiley-Blackwell, 2015. Paperback: ISBN 978-1405193405, 1405193409, 978-1405193559, 1405193557. LCCN OCLC 885229460.
- Torn Halves: Political Conflict in Literary and Cultural Theory. Manchester: Manchester University Press. 1996. (Hardcover: ISBN 978-0-7190-4776-3. Paperback: ISBN 978-0-7190-4777-0.) LCCN 95030849 OCLC 32822735. An online copy may be available from HathiTrust.

Editions

- Frantz Fanon. Écrits sur l’aliénation et la liberté, Œuvres II. Textes réunis, introduits et présentés par Jean Khalfa et Robert JC Young. Paris: La Découverte, 2016. ISBN 978-2707186386, 2707186384. LCCN OCLC 930770745.
- Frantz Fanon. Alienation and Freedom eds Jean Khalfa and Robert J.C. Young, trans. Steve Corcoran. London: Bloomsbury, 2018.

Edited works

- Untying the Text: A Post-Structuralist Reader. edited, with an introduction. London; Boston: Routledge & Kegan Paul. 1981. (Hardcover: ISBN 978-0-7100-0804-6. Paperback: ISBN 978-0-7100-0805-3.) LCCN 81212202 OCLC 7964743.
- Post-Structuralism and the Question of History. edited, with an introduction, with Derek Attridge and Geoff Bennington. Cambridge; New York: Cambridge University Press. 1987. ISBN 978-0-521-32759-6. LCCN 86012972. OCLC 13643529.

Prefaces

- 'Sartre: The African Philosopher’. Preface to Jean-Paul Sartre, Colonialism and Neo-colonialism. Trans. Azzedine Haddour, Steve Brewer and Terry McWilliams. London; New York: Routledge, 2001. (Hardcover: ISBN 978-0-415-19145-6. Paperback: ISBN 978-0-415-19146-3.) LCCN 00045940. OCLC 45172634.
- 'Poetica del mutamento culturale radicale'. Preface to Frantz Fanon, Scritti politici. L'anno V della rivoluzione algerina, vol. 2. Trans. Miguel Mellino. Roma: DeriveApprodi, 2007. ISBN 978-88-89969-16-8. OCLC 799775650.

Electronic publications

- ‘Le pagine che bruciano il passato’, Caffé Europa 292, 09.01.06.
- ‘The Violent State’, Naked Punch, Supplement 02, 2009.
- 'What is the Postcolonial?', Ariel 40:1 (2009) 13–25,
