= Robert Bernasconi =

British philosopher

- Born: Robert L. Bernasconi; 1950 (age 75–76)

Academic background
- Education: University of Sussex (B.A., D. Phil.)
- Thesis: Heidegger's History of Being and Language (1982)

Academic work
- Era: 21st-century philosophy
- Region: Western philosophy
- School or tradition: Continental philosophy Deconstruction
- Institutions: Pennsylvania State University; University of Memphis; University of Essex; Sussex University
- Main interests: Ontology; Political philosophy Critical race theory

Robert L. Bernasconi (born 1950) is an American philosopher who is the Edwin Erle Sparks Professor of Philosophy at Pennsylvania State University. He is known as a reader of Martin Heidegger and Emmanuel Levinas, and for his work on the concept of race. He has also written on the history of philosophy. Bernasconi was the president of Hegel Society of America from 2012 to 2014.

== Career ==
Bernasconi received his doctorate from Sussex University. He taught at the University of Essex for thirteen years before taking up a position at the University of Memphis. In the fall of 2009, he moved from Memphis to the philosophy department at Pennsylvania State University. Bernasconi comes from an academic family and was born in Newcastle, United Kingdom. His brother John is the Director of Fine arts at the University of Hull. The family are of Italian background.

== Interests ==
In addition to extensive work on Heidegger and Levinas, Bernasconi has written on Immanuel Kant, Georg Wilhelm Friedrich Hegel, Hannah Arendt, Hans-Georg Gadamer, Jean-Paul Sartre, Frantz Fanon, Jacques Derrida, and numerous others.

In the early 1990s Bernasconi began to develop an interest in the concepts of race and racism, particularly in relation to the history of philosophy. In addition to writing many articles on race, racism, slavery, African philosophy and related topics, he has also edited and published primary material relating to these themes.

== Bibliography ==
=== Books authored ===
- Critical Philosophy of Race: Essays (Oxford: Oxford University Press, 2022).
- How to Read Sartre (New York: W. W. Norton, 2007).
- Heidegger in Question: The Art of Existing (Atlantic Highlands: Humanities Press, 1993).
- The Question of Language in Heidegger's History of Being (Atlantic Highlands: Humanities Press, 1985).

=== Books edited ===
- Race, Hybridity, and Miscegenation (Bristol: Thoemmes, 2005). With Kristie Dotson.
- Race and Anthropology (Bristol: Thoemmes, 2003).
- Race and Racism in Continental Philosophy (Bloomington: Indiana University Press, 2003). With Sybol Cook.
- American Theories of Polygenesis (Bristol: Thoemmes, 2002).
- The Cambridge Companion to Levinas (Cambridge: Cambridge University Press, 2002). With Simon Critchley.
- Concepts of Race in the Eighteenth Century (Bristol: Thoemmes, 2001).
- Race (Oxford: Blackwell, 2001).
- In Proximity: Emmanuel Levinas and the Eighteenth Century (Lubbock, Texas: Texas Tech University Press, 2001). With Melvin New & Richard A. Cohen.
- The Idea of Race (Indianapolis: Hackett Publishing, 2000). With Tommy Lee Lott.
- Re-Reading Levinas (Bloomington: Indiana University Press, 1991). With Simon Critchley.
- The Provocation of Levinas (New York: Routledge, 1988). With David Wood.
- Derrida and Différance (Warwick: Parousia Press, 1985; Evanston: Northwestern University Press, 1988 [United States]). With David Wood.
- Time and Metaphysics (Coventry: Parousia Press, 1982). With David Wood.

== See also ==
- List of deconstructionists
- Africana philosophy
- Other (philosophy)
- Critical race theory
- Racism
