= Gauguin (disambiguation) =

Paul Gauguin (1848–1903) was a French artist.

Gauguin may also refer to:

== People ==
- Jean René Gauguin (1881–1961), French–Danish sculptor
- Paul René Gauguin (1911–1976), Norwegian artist
- Pola Gauguin (1883–1961), Danish–Norwegian artist

== Other uses ==
- Gauguin (crater), a crater on Mercury
- 10136 Gauguin, a minor planet
- Paul Gauguin (ship)
- Gauguin: Off the Beaten Track, a 2013 comic book by Maximilien Le Roy and Christophe Gaultier
