= Cosmos (Onfray book) =

2015 book by Michel Onfray

- Author: Michel Onfray
- Language: French
- Series: Brève encyclopédie du monde
- Publisher: Flammarion
- Publication date: 18 March 2015
- Publication place: France
- Pages: 576
- ISBN: 978-2-08-129036-5

Cosmos. Une ontologie matérialiste (lit. 'Cosmos: a materialist ontology') is a 2015 book by the French philosopher Michel Onfray. Onfray designated it as the first part in his trilogy Brève encyclopédie du monde.

== Summary ==
Michel Onfray uses the death of his father in 2009 and a discussion about the night sky as the starting point for a reflection on the cosmos. He lays out a personal philosophy of nature by covering a number of subjects. The subjects include animals and human uses of animals, winemaking, oral poetry, African masks, cross-dressing, astronomy, Giuseppe Arcimboldo, land art and repetitive music.

== Reception ==
Flammarion published Cosmos on 18 March 2015. In Philosophie Magazine, Catherine Portevin described its first 25 pages, which are about Onfray's father, as "dazzling", and the book overall as "a little bumpy". She said the book revolves around a pagan worldview, with few references to philosophers, and "surprising" detours to subjects such as African animism, Romani culture, Japanese haiku and Buddhism. Portevin wrote that the book's "great Nietzschean 'yes to life'" by necessity also comes with "aggressive rejections". Évelyne Pieiller of Le Monde diplomatique wrote that Cosmos adds to the difficulty in recent years to pin down Onfray, who came to prominence as a proponent of atheism and left-wing politics. Pieiller wrote that Onfray's atheism here competes with a vague spirituality, his rationalism with a celebration of instinct, and his libertarian attitude with a respect for traditions. By seemingly prioritising vitality over reason and civilisation, Pieiller said the book sometimes echoes a sensibility found in the works of Maurice Barrès, Ludwig Klages and Oswald Spengler.

By June 2015, Cosmos had sold in more than 80,000 copies. This made it Onfray's third best selling book to date, after Atheist Manifesto (2005) and Le Crépuscule d'une idole (2010).

== Legacy ==
At the publication of Cosmos, Onfray announced it was the first book in a trilogy he calls Brève encyclopédie du monde (lit. 'Brief encyclopedia of the world'). It was followed by the standalone books Décadence (lit. 'Decadence') in 2017 and Sagesse (lit. 'Wisdom') in 2019.
