= Philosophy of happiness =

Philosophical theory

The philosophy of happiness is the philosophical concern with the existence, nature, and attainment of happiness. Some philosophers believe happiness can be understood as the moral goal of life or as an aspect of chance; indeed, in most European languages the term happiness is synonymous with luck. Thus, philosophers usually explicate on happiness as either a state of mind, or a life that goes well for the person leading it. Given the pragmatic concern for the attainment of happiness, research in psychology has guided many modern-day philosophers in developing their theories.

== Ancient Greece ==
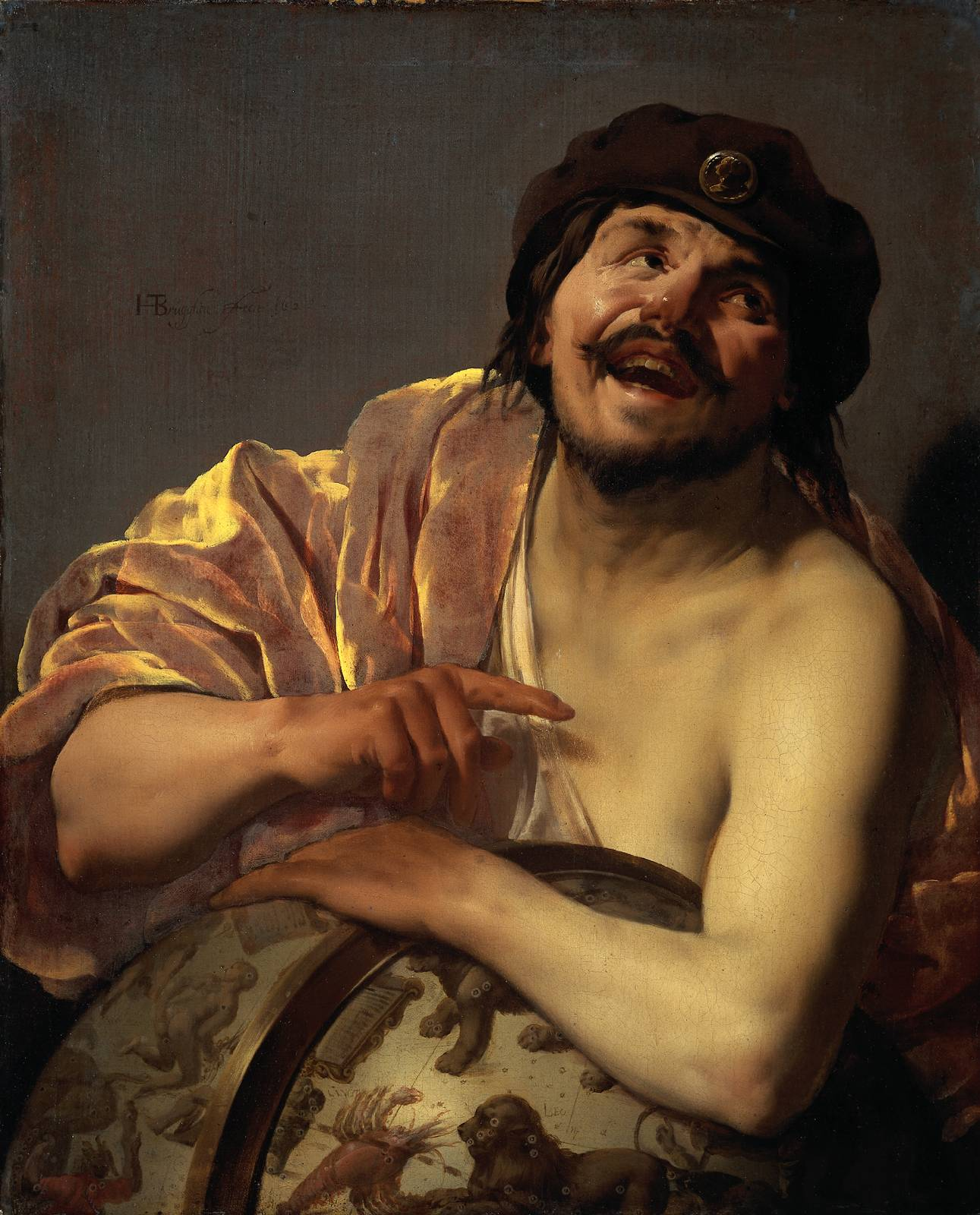
Democritus by Hendrick ter Brugghen, 1628.

=== Democritus ===
Democritus (c. 460 – c. 370 BC) is known as the 'laughing philosopher' because of his emphasis on the value of 'cheerfulness'.

=== Plato ===
The man who makes everything that leads to happiness depends upon himself, and not upon other men, has adopted the very best plan for living happily

— Plato, The Republic

Plato (c. 428 – c. 347 BCE) teaches in the Republic that a life committed to knowledge and virtue will result in happiness and self-realization. To achieve happiness, one should become immune to changes in the material world and strive to gain the knowledge of the eternal, immutable forms that reside in the realm of ideas.

The Chariot Allegory from the Phaedrus is possibly Plato’s most important teaching on how to achieve inner happiness.

Plato sees societal happiness stemming from citizens treating each other justly, leading virtuous lives, and each fulfilling their social function.

=== Aristotle ===
A marble statue of Aristotle, created by Romans in 330 BC.

Aristotle (384 – 322 BCE) was considered an ancient Greek scholar in the disciplines of ethics, metaphysics, biology and botany, amongst others. Aristotle described eudaimonia (Greek: εὐδαιμονία) as the goal of human thought and action. Eudaimonia is often translated to mean happiness, but some scholars contend that "human flourishing" may be a more accurate translation. More specifically, eudaimonia (arete, Greek: ἀρετή) refers to an inherently positive and divine state of being in which humanity can actively strive for and achieve. Given that this state is the most positive state for a human to be in, it is often simplified to mean happiness. However, Aristotle's use of the term in Nicomachiean Ethics extends beyond the general sense of happiness.

Within the Nicomachean Ethics, Aristotle points to the fact that many aims are really only intermediate aims, and are desired only because they make the achievement of higher aims possible. Therefore, things such as wealth, intelligence, and courage are valued only in relation to other things, while eudaimonia is the only thing valuable by itself.

Aristotle regarded virtue as necessary for a person to be happy and held that without virtue the most that may be attained is contentment. Within Aristotelian ethics, achieving virtue involves asking the question "how should I be" rather than "what should I do". A fully virtuous person is described as achieving eudaimonia, and therefore would be undeniably happy.

=== Cynics ===
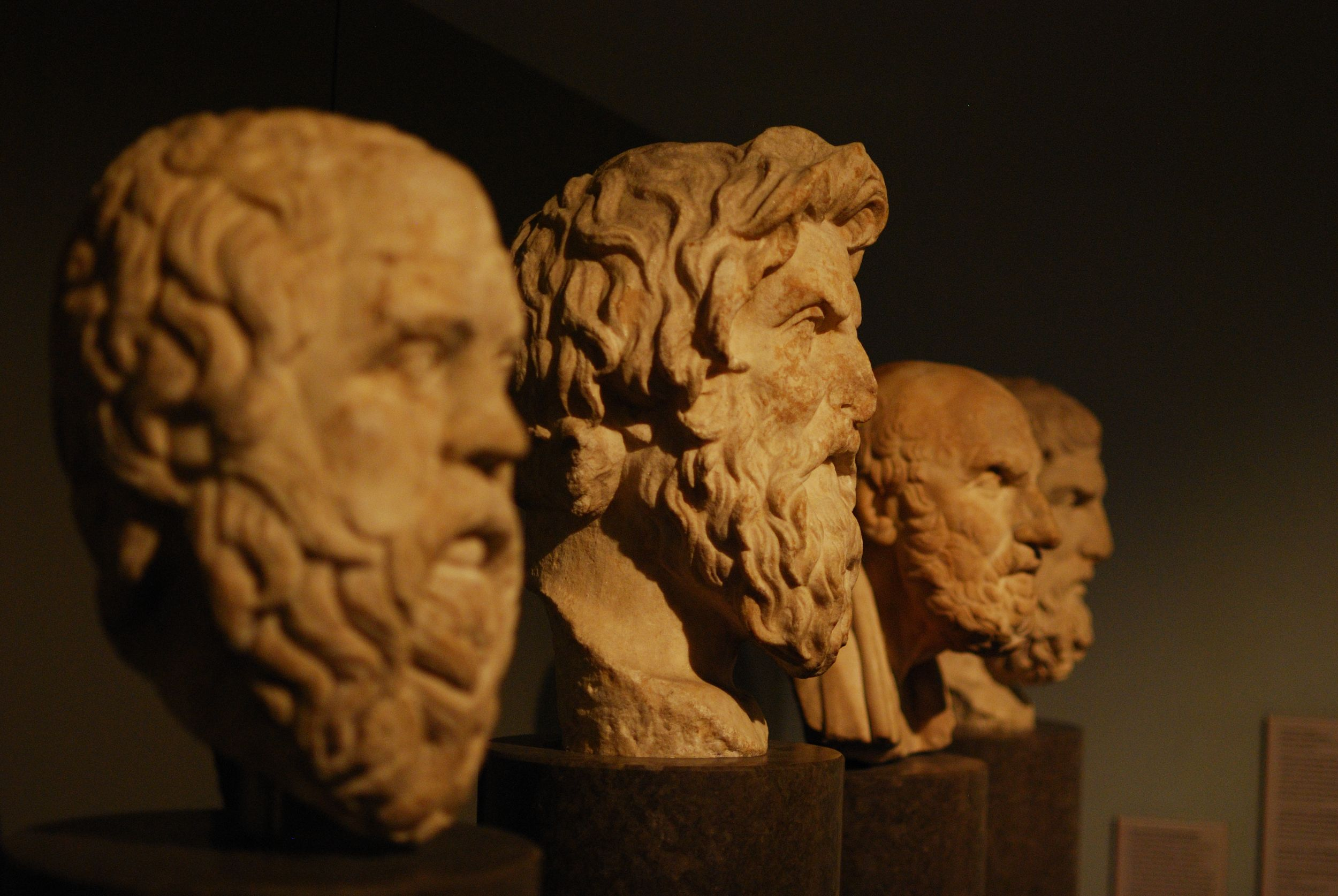
The carved busts of Socrates, Antisthenes, Chrysippus, and Epicurus.

Antisthenes (c. 445 – c. 365 BCE), often regarded as the founder of Cynicism, advocated an ascetic life lived in accordance with virtue. Xenophon testifies that Antisthenes had praised the joy that sprang "from out of one's soul," and Diogenes Laërtius relates that Antisthenes was fond of saying: "I would rather go mad than feel pleasure." He maintained that virtue was sufficient in itself to ensure happiness, only needing the strength of a Socrates.

He, along with all following Cynics, rejected any conventional notions of happiness involving money, power, and fame, to lead entirely virtuous, and thus happy, lives. Thus, happiness can be gained through rigorous training (askesis, Greek: ἄσκησις) and by living in a way which was natural for humans, rejecting all conventional desires, preferring a simple life free from all possessions.

Diogenes of Sinope (c. 412 – c. 323 BCE) is most frequently seen as the perfect embodiment of the philosophy. The Stoics themselves saw him as one of the few, if not only, who have had achieved the state of sage.

=== Cyrenaics ===
As a consequence the sage, even if he has his troubles, will nonetheless be happy, even if few pleasures accrue to him.

— Diogenes Laërtius on Anniceris

The Cyrenaics were a school of philosophy established by Aristippus of Cyrene (c. 435 – c. 356 BCE). The school asserted that the only good is positive pleasure, and pain is the only evil. They posit that all feeling is momentary so all past and future pleasure have no real existence for an individual, and that among present pleasures there is no distinction of kind. Claudius Aelianus, in his Historical Miscellany, writes about Aristippus:

"He recommended that one should concrete on the present day, and indeed on the very part of it in which one is acting and thinking. For only the present, he said, truly belongs to us, and not what has passed by or what we are anticipating: for the one is gone and done with, and it is uncertain whether the other will come to be"

Some immediate pleasures can create more than their equivalent of pain. The wise person should be in control of pleasures rather than be enslaved to them, otherwise pain will result, and this requires judgement to evaluate the different pleasures of life.

=== Pyrrho ===
Pyrrho (c. 360 – c. 270 BCE) founded Pyrrhonism, the first Western school of philosophical skepticism. The goal of Pyrrhonist practice is to attain the state of ataraxia (ataraxia, Greek: ἀταραξία) – freedom from perturbation. Pyrrho identified that what prevented people from attaining ataraxia was their beliefs in non-evident matters, i.e., holding dogmas. To free people from belief the ancient Pyrrhonists developed a variety of skeptical arguments.

=== Epicurus ===
Of all the means which wisdom acquires to ensure happiness throughout the whole of life, by far the most important is friendship.

— Epicurus

Epicurus (c. 341 – c. 270 BCE), the founder of Epicureanism, taught that the aim of life was to attain a state of tranquility (ataraxia, Greek: ἀταραξία) and freedom from fear, as well as absence of bodily pain (aponia, Greek: ἀπονία). Toward these ends, Epicurus recommended an ascetic lifestyle, noble friendship, and the avoidance of politics.

One aid to achieving happiness is the tetrapharmakos or the four-fold cure:

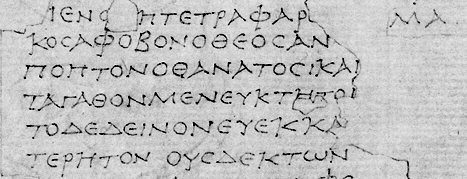
A papyrus copy depicting the Epicurean tetrapharmakos in Philodemus of Gadara's Adversus Sophistas – (P.Herc.1005), col. 5

"Do not fear god,
Do not worry about death;
What is good is easy to get, and
What is terrible is easy to endure."
(Philodemus, Herculaneum Papyrus, 1005, 4.9–14).

=== Stoics ===
If you work at that which is before you, following right reason seriously, vigorously, calmly, without allowing anything else to distract you, but keeping your divine part pure, as if you were bound to give it back immediately; if you hold to this, expecting nothing, but satisfied to live now according to nature, speaking heroic truth in every word that you utter, you will live happy. And there is no man able to prevent this.

— Marcus Aurelius, Meditations

Stoicism was a school of philosophy established by Zeno of Citium (c. 334 – c. 262 BCE). While Zeno was syncretic in thought, his primary influence were the Cynics, with Crates of Thebes (c. 365 – c. 285 BCE) as his mentor. Stoicism is a philosophy of personal ethics that provides a system of logic and views about the natural world.

Modern use of the term "stoic" typically refers not to followers of Stoicism, but to individuals who feel indifferent to experiences of the world, or represses feelings in general. Given Stoicism's emphasis on feeling indifferent to negativity, it is seen as a path to achieving happiness.

Stoics believe that "virtue is sufficient for happiness". One who has attained this sense of virtue would become a sage. In the words of Epictetus, this sage would be "sick and yet happy, in peril and yet happy, dying and yet happy, in exile and happy, in disgrace and happy."

The Stoics therefore spent their time trying to attain virtue. This would only be achieved if one was to dedicate their life studying Stoic logic, Stoic physics, and Stoic ethics. Stoics describe themselves as "living in agreement with nature." Certain schools of Stoicism refer to Aristotle's concept of eudaimonia as the goal of practicing Stoic philosophy.

== Ancient Rome ==
=== School of the Sextii ===
The School of the Sextii was founded by Quintus Sextius the Elder (fl. 50 BCE). It characterized itself mainly as a philosophical-medical school, blending Pythagorean, Platonic, Cynic, and Stoic elements together. They argued that to achieve happiness, one ought to be vegetarian, have nightly examinations of conscience, and avoid both consumerism and politics, and believe that an elusive incorporeal power pervades the body.

=== Augustine of Hippo ===
The happy life is joy based on the truth. This is joy grounded in you, O God, who are the truth.

— St. Augustine, Confessions.

St. Augustine of Hippo (354 – 430 AD) was an early Christian theologian and philosopher whose writings influenced the development of Western Christianity and Western philosophy.

For St. Augustine, all human actions revolve around love, and the primary problem humans face is the misplacing of love. Only in God can one find happiness, as He is source of happiness. Since humanity was brought forth from God, but has since fallen, one's soul dimly remembers the happiness from when one was with God. Thus, if one orients themselves toward the love of God, all other loves will become properly ordered. In this manner, St. Augustine follows the Neoplatonic tradition in asserting that happiness lays in the contemplation of the purely intelligible realm.

St. Augustine deals with the concept of happiness directly in his treatises De beata vita and Contra Academicos.

=== Boethius ===
Mortal creatures have one overall concern. This they work at by toiling over a whole range of pursuits, advancing on different paths, but striving to attain the one goal of happiness.

— Boethius, The Consolation of Philosophy.

Boethius (c. 480–524 AD) was a philosopher, most famous for writing The Consolation of Philosophy. The work has been described as having had the single most important influence on the Christianity of the Middle Ages and early Renaissance and as the last great work of the Classical Period. (Note: Dante identified Boethius as the "last of the Romans and first of the Scholastics" among the doctors in his Paradise (see The Divine Comedy and also below).) The book describes many themes, but among them he discusses how happiness can be attainable despite changing fortune, while considering the nature of happiness and God.

He posits that happiness is acquired by attaining the perfect good, and that perfect good is God. He then concludes that as God ruled the universe through Love, prayer to God and the application of Love would lead to true happiness.

== Middle Ages ==
=== Avicenna ===
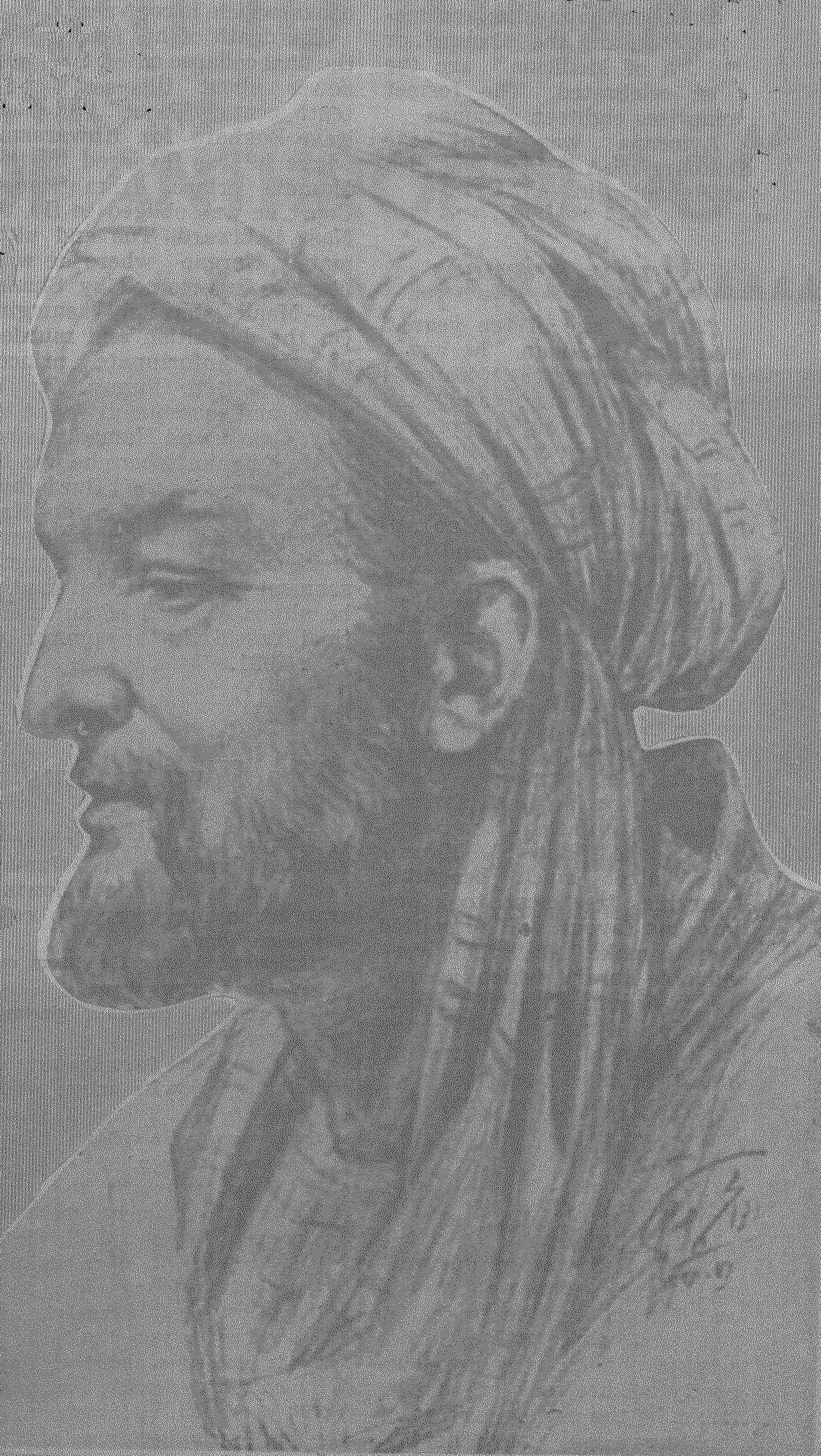
A drawing of Avicenna, 1960.

Avicenna (c. 980–1037), also known as 'Ibn-Sina', was a polymath and jurist; he is regarded as one of the most significant thinkers in the Islamic Golden Age. According to him, happiness is the aim of humans, and that real happiness is pure and free from worldly interest. Ultimately, happiness is reached through the conjunction of the human intellect with the separate active intellect.

=== Al-Ghazali ===
Al-Ghazali (c. 1058–1111) was a Muslim theologian, jurist, philosopher, and mystic of Persian descent. Produced near the end of his life, al-Ghazali wrote The Alchemy of Happiness (Kimiya-yi Sa'ādat, (Persian: كيمياى سعادت). In the work, he emphasizes the importance of observing the ritual requirements of Islam, the actions that would lead to salvation, and the avoidance of sin. According to Al-Ghazali, there are four main constituents of happiness: self-knowledge, knowledge of God, knowledge of this world as it really is, and the knowledge of the next world as it really is. Only by exercising the human faculty of reason – a God-given ability – can one transform the soul from worldliness to complete devotion to God, the ultimate happiness.

=== Maimonides ===
Maimonides (c. 1135–1204) was a Jewish philosopher and astronomer, who became one of the most prolific and influential Torah scholars and physicians. He writes that happiness is ultimately and essentially intellectual.

=== Thomas Aquinas ===
Man is not perfectly happy, so long as something remains for him to desire and seek.

— St. Thomas Aquinas, Summa Theologica

St. Thomas Aquinas (1225 – 1274 AD) was a philosopher and theologian who became a Doctor of the Church in 1323. He syncretized Aristotelianism and Catholic theology in his magnum opus Summa Theologica.

According to Thomas Aquinas, perfect happiness cannot be found in any physical pleasure, any amount of worldly power, any degree of temporal fame or honor, or indeed in any finite reality. It can only be found in something that is infinite and perfect – and this is God. And since God is not a material thing but is pure spirit, we are united to God by knowing and loving Him. Consequently, the union with God is the most perfect human happiness and the ultimate goal of human life.

== Early Modern ==
=== Michel de Montaigne ===
Michel de Montaigne (1533–1592) was a French philosopher. Influenced by Hellenistic philosophy and Christianity, alongside the conviction of the separation of public and private spheres of life, Montaigne writes that happiness is a subjective state of mind and that satisfaction differs from person to person. He continues by acknowledging that one must be allowed a private sphere of life to realize those particular attempts of happiness without the interference of society.

=== Jeremy Bentham ===
Jeremy Bentham (1748–1832) was a British philosopher, jurist, and social reformer. He is regarded as the founder of modern utilitarianism.

The right course of action, according to Jeremy Bentham, is that which causes the highest amount of utility, where utility is defined as the aggregate pleasure (happiness) minus any suffering (pain) of each individual affected by the action. For the purpose of calculating utility of a given action, he devised Felicific calculus. According to this calculus, for example, ascetic sacrifice is morally wrong.

=== Arthur Schopenhauer ===
Arthur Schopenhauer (1788–1860) was a German philosopher. His philosophy express that egotistical acts are those that are guided by self-interest, desire for pleasure or happiness, whereas only compassion can be a moral act.

Schopenhauer explains happiness in terms of a wish that is satisfied, which in turn gives rise to a new wish. And the absence of satisfaction is suffering, which results in an empty longing. He also links happiness with the movement of time, as we feel happy when time moves faster and feel sad when time slows down.

=== Nietzsche ===
Friedrich Nietzsche (1844–1900) was a German philosopher, poet, cultural critic, and philologist whose work has exerted a profound influence on contemporary philosophy. Nietzsche critiqued the English Utilitarians' focus on attaining the greatest happiness, stating that "Man does not strive for happiness, only the Englishman does". Nietzsche meant that making happiness one's ultimate goal and the aim of one's existence, in his words "makes one contemptible." Nietzsche instead yearned for a culture that would set higher, more difficult goals than "mere happiness." He introduced the quasi-dystopic figure of the "last man" as a kind of thought experiment against the utilitarians and happiness-seekers.

These "small men" who seek after only their own pleasure and health, avoiding all danger, exertion, difficulty, challenge, and struggle are contemptible. Nietzsche instead wants us to consider the value of what is difficult, what can only be earned through struggle, difficulty, and pain. He wants us to consider the affirmative value of suffering and unhappiness which create everything of great worth in life, including all the highest achievements of human culture, not least of all philosophy.

== Contemporary ==
=== Władysław Tatarkiewicz ===
Władysław Tatarkiewicz (1886–1980) was a Polish philosopher and historian. For Tatarkiewicz, happiness is a fundamental ethical category and true happiness requires total satisfaction, that is, satisfaction with life as a whole.

=== Herbert Marcuse ===
Herbert Marcuse (1898–1979) was a German-American philosopher, sociologist, and political theorist, associated with the Frankfurt School of critical theory.

In his 1937 essay 'The Affirmative Character of Culture,' he suggests culture develops tension within the structure of society, and in that tension can challenge the current social order. If it separates itself from the everyday world, the demand for happiness will cease to be external, and begin to become an object of spiritual contemplation. In the One-Dimensional Man, his criticism of consumerism suggests that the current system is one that claims to be democratic, but is authoritarian in character, as only a few individuals dictate the perceptions of freedom by only allowing certain choices of happiness to be available for purchase. He further suggests that the conception that 'happiness can be bought' is one that is psychologically damaging.

=== Viktor Frankl ===
It is a characteristic of the American culture that, again and again, one is commanded and ordered to 'be happy.' But happiness cannot be pursued; it must ensue. One must have a reason to 'be happy'.

— Viktor Frankl

Viktor Frankl (1905–1997) was an Austrian neurologist, psychiatrist, Holocaust survivor and founder of logotherapy. His philosophy revolved around the emphasis on meaning, the value of suffering, and responsibility to something greater than the self; only if one encounters those questions can one be happy.

=== Robert Nozick ===
Robert Nozick (1938–2002) was an American philosopher and professor at Harvard University. He is best known for his political philosophy and for his thought experiments.

In the Experience Machine (1974) thought experiment he criticizes hedonistic notions of happiness by imagining a choice between everyday reality and an apparently preferable simulated reality which provides unlimited enjoyment. The utility monster (1974) is a thought experiment created by Robert Nozick to criticize utilitarian notion of aggregate pleasure (happiness).

=== Michel Onfray ===
Michel Onfray (born 1959) is a French writer and philosopher with a hedonistic, epicurean, and atheist worldview. In A Hedonist Manifesto: The Power to Exist, Onfray writes that the political dimension of hedonism runs from Epicurus to John Stuart Mill to Jeremy Bentham and Claude Adrien Helvétius. Political hedonism aims to create the greatest happiness for the greatest numbers. Onfray defines hedonism "as an introspective attitude to life based on taking pleasure yourself and pleasuring others, without harming yourself or anyone else."

== See also ==
- Affective neuroscience
- Eudaimonia
- Happiness
- Happiness economics
- Positive psychology
- Religion and happiness
- Self-fulfillment
