= Laurent Bouvet =

French political scientist (1968–2021)

- Born: 9 July 1968; Paris, France
- Died: 18 December 2021 (aged 53); Paris, France
- Education: Sciences Po; École des Hautes Études en Sciences Sociales
- Occupation: Political scientist
- Spouse: Astrid Panosyan

Laurent Bouvet (French: [loʁɑ̃ buvɛ]; 9 July 1968 – 18 December 2021) was a French political scientist. In 2016, he cofounded the political movement Printemps républicain.

Bouvet died from complications of amyotrophic lateral sclerosis on 18 December 2021, at the age of 53.

A fictional character closely based on Bouvet is the main character in the 2024 satirical novel Les derniers jours du Parti socialiste by Aurélien Bellanger.

== Publications ==
=== Monographs ===
- Le Communautarisme : mythes et réalités. Paris. 2007 – via Lignes de repères.
- Le Sens du peuple : la gauche, la démocratie, le populisme. Paris. 2012 – via Gallimard.
- L'Insécurité culturelle : sortir du malaise identitaire français. Paris. 2015 – via Fayard.
- La Gauche zombie. Chroniques d'une malédiction politique. Paris. 2017 – via Lemieux éditeur.
- La Nouvelle Question laïque - Choisir la République. Paris. 2019 – via Flammarion.
- Le Péril identitaire. 2020 – via éditions de l'Observatoire.

=== Collections ===
- With Thierry Chopin (1997). Le Fédéraliste : la démocratie apprivoisée. Paris – via Michalon.
- With Jacques Delors; Donate Kluxen-Pyta (1998). France-Allemagne : le bond en avant. Paris – via Éditions Odile Jacob.
- With Laurent Baumel (2003). L'Année zéro de la gauche. Paris – via Michalon.

=== Dictionaries and manuals ===
- With Christophe Giolito (2009). La Culture générale à Sciences-Po. Paris – via SEDES.
- Alcaud, David; et al. (2010). Dictionnaire de sciences politiques. Paris – via Sirey.
