= Maximilien Le Roy =

French comics artist (born 1985)

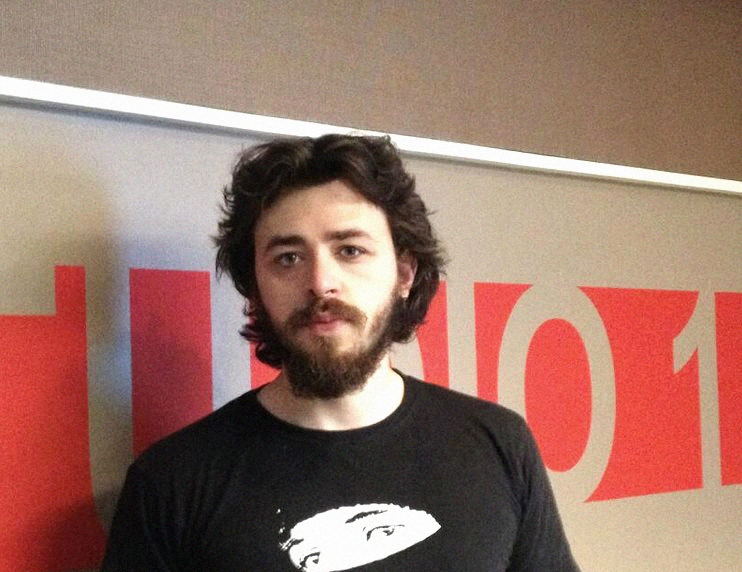
- Le Roy in 2016
- Born: 29 November 1985 (age 40) France
- Areas: Writer, Artist
- Notable works: Nietzsche, se créer liberté Thoreau: A Sublime Life; Faire le mur

Maximilien Le Roy (born 29 November 1985) is a French comics creator. His comic books have often been biographies and inspired by travels. He has made several comics about the Israeli–Palestinian conflict.

== Life and career ==
Maximilien Le Roy was born in France on 29 November 1985. His comic book Hosni (2009) is about a homeless man in Lyon. An interest in Friedrich Nietzsche led him to make Nietzsche, se créer liberté (2010), a biographical comic book about Nietzsche, based on a script by Michel Onfray.

Le Roy visited Palestine in 2008 and 2009 and this became the inspiration for several comic books about the Israeli–Palestinian conflict: Gaza (2009), Faire le mur (2010) and Les chemins de traverse (2010). He travelled in Vietnam after which he made Dans la nuit la liberté nous écoute (2011), which is about Albert Clavier, a French soldier who defected to the Viet Minh during the First Indochina War.

In collaboration with A. Dan, Le Roy made Thoreau: A Sublime Life, a biographical comic book about the American philosopher Henry David Thoreau, which was published in French in 2012 and in English translation in 2016. Le Roy has made further biographical comics about people including Paul Gauguin, Louis Auguste Blanqui and Antonin Artaud.

== Selected publications ==
- Hosni, La Boîte à bulles, 2009.
- Gaza, un pavé dans la mer, editor, La Boîte à bulles, 2009.
- Les chemins de traverse, with Soulman, La Boîte à bulles, 2010.
- Faire le mur, Casterman, 2010.
- Nietzsche, se créer liberté, based on a script by Michel Onfray, Le Lombard, 2010
- Dans la nuit la liberté nous écoute, Le Lombard, 2011.
- Thoreau. La vie sublime, with A. Dan (Alexandre Daniel), Le Lombard, 2012.
- España la vida, with Eddy Vaccaro, Casterman, 2013.
- Palestine, dans quel État ?, with Emmanuel Prost, La boîte à bulles, 2013.
- Gauguin, loin de la route, with Gaultier, Le Lombard, 2013.
- Ni dieu ni maître. Auguste Blanqui, l'enferme, with Renart, Casterman, 2014.
