= Nous vivrons =

French antisemitism activist group

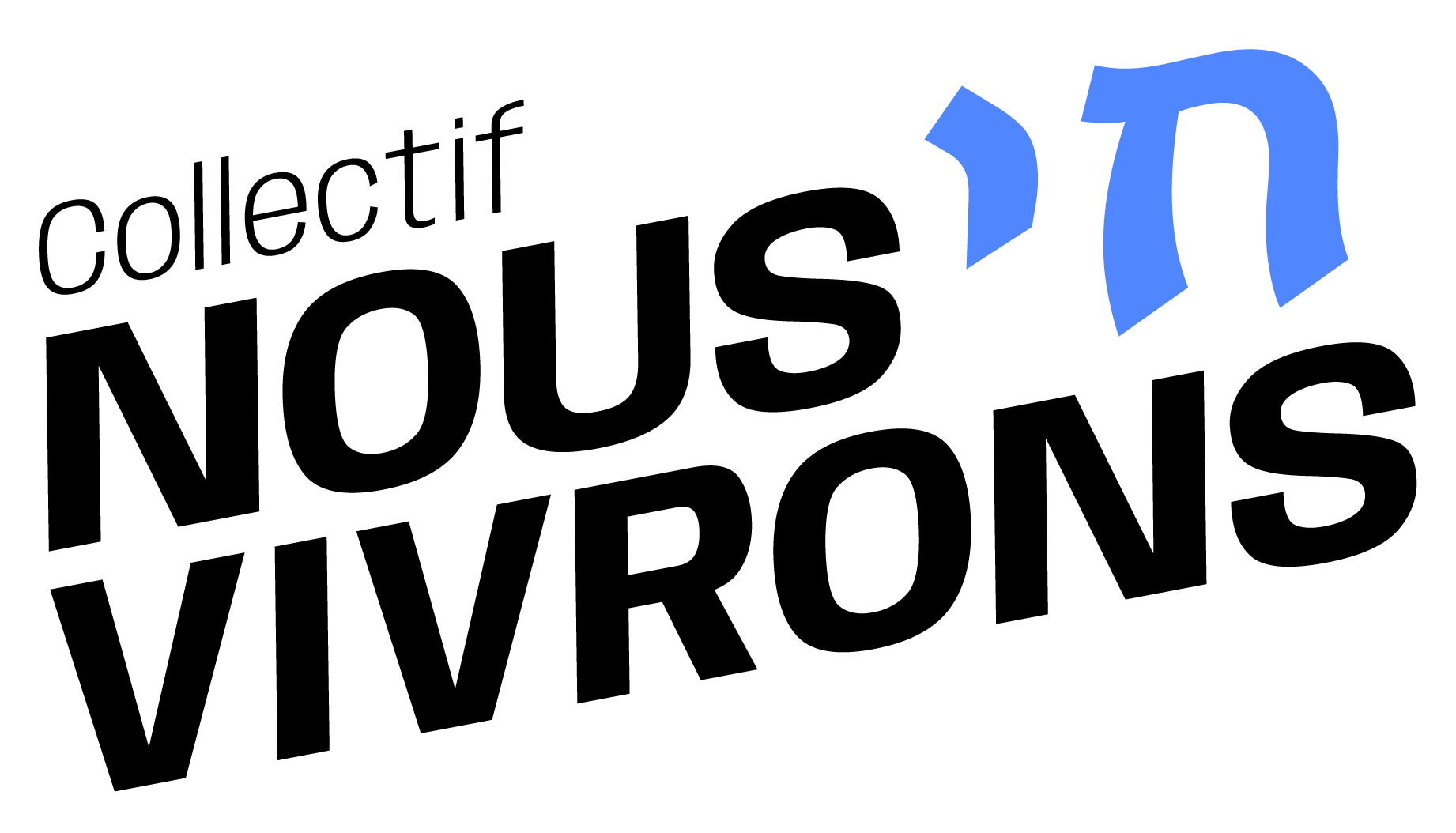
Nous vivrons logo

Nous vivrons is a Zionist collective dedicated to combating antisemitism in France, founded by former activists of the Union des étudiants juifs de France in November 2023 following the October 7 attacks.

It is chaired by Sarah Aizenman and has about a hundred active members. It advocates for a two-state solution to the Israeli–Palestinian conflict and asserts that the antisemitic threat posed by the far-right is equivalent to that posed by the far-left. Close to Printemps républicain, it garnered attention during the demonstrations for International Women's Day in 2024 and 2025 in Paris, where its participation led to tensions with pro-Palestinian activists and feminist organisations.

== History ==
Nous vivrons was founded in November 2023, shortly after the October 7 attacks in Israel, by former activists of the Union des étudiants juifs de France who had been active there in the early 2000s. The collective's name is inspired by a watercolor painting by the artist Joann Sfar. Its spokesperson and president is Sarah Aizenman, a business owner and communications professional. Its vice presidents are Bettina Manchel and Benjamin Cymerman. In 2025, according to Libération, it had about a hundred active members, two-thirds of whom are women.

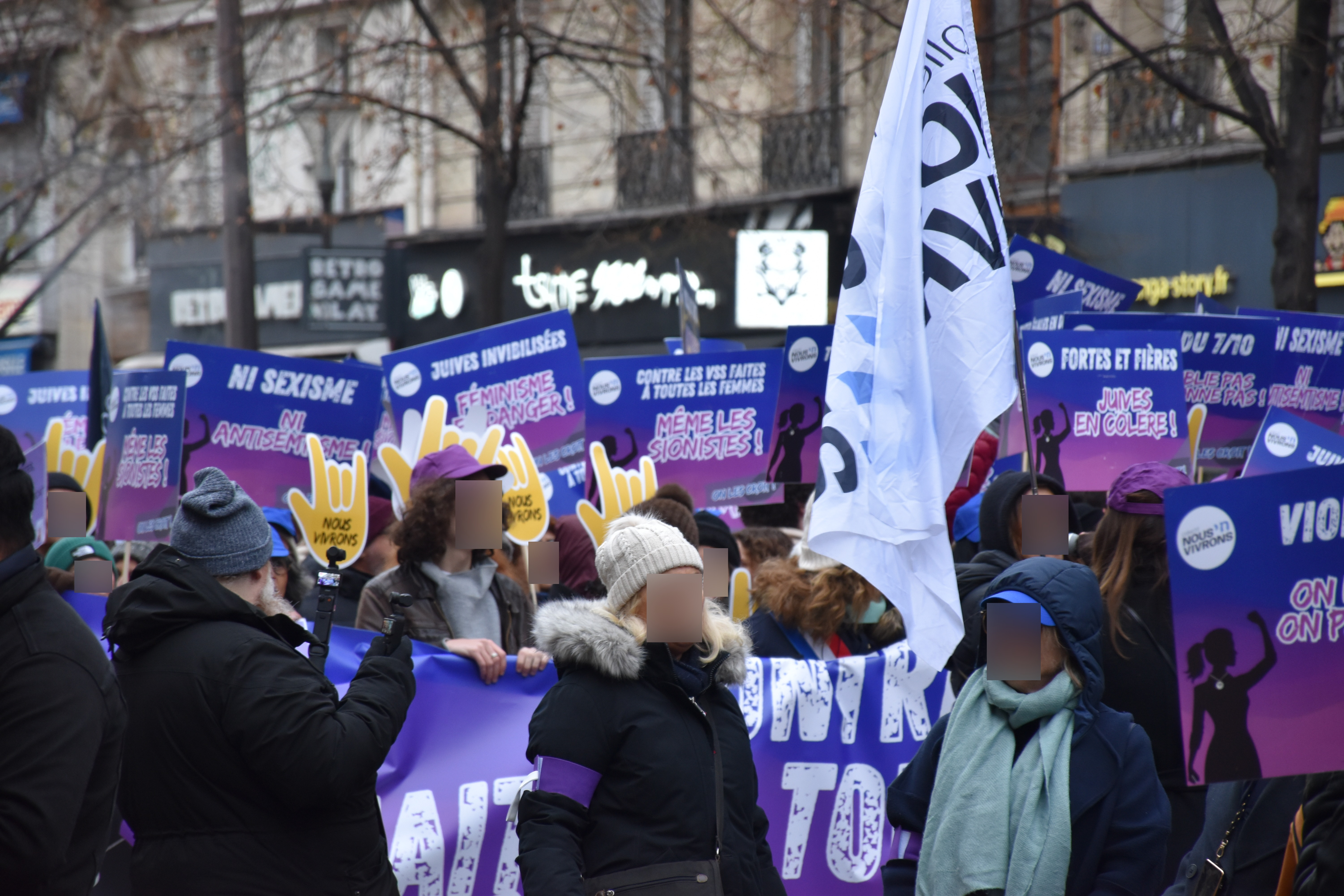
Nous vivrons at the demonstration against sexist, sexual and gender-based violence on 22 November 2025 in Paris

In 2024, Nous vivrons took part in the International Women's Day (IWD) Paris demonstration to denounce the rapes and murders committed against Israeli women during the October 7 attacks. The organisation marched as part of a procession of Jewish community groups, flanked by members of the Jewish Community Protection Service (SPCJ), which was involved in clashes with pro-Palestinian activists. The tensions led to scuffles, glass projectiles being thrown at security personnel, and the use of tear gas by the SPCJ, before the procession of Jewish demonstrators was escorted away by the police. Both sides blamed each other for the clashes.

During the 2025 IWD Paris demonstration, Nous vivrons was denied access to the main procession organised by the Grève féministe collective, on the grounds of political differences regarding Benjamin Netanyahu's policies and the Gaza war. Kept at a distance by the police, the collective published an opinion piece in Le Point accusing feminist organisations of complicity in antisemitism. The left-wing Jewish organisations Tsedek! and French Jewish Union for Peace contested the collective's account, emphasising that the exclusion targeted a political group and not Jewish women as such.

== Ideology ==
Although often perceived as feminist, Nous vivrons denies being a feminist collective and instead defines itself as "a committee fighting against antisemitism" and "Zionist". It advocates a two-state solution to the Israeli–Palestinian conflict, whilst refusing to comment on Israeli politics. The collective asserts that the far-right and the far-left are equivalent in terms of the antisemitic threat they pose, and thus disrupts events organised by the National Rally, Reconquête and La France insoumise. Close to Printemps républicain, the collective has found support from several prominent figures from that movement, including its president Marika Bret, as well as MP Caroline Yadan of the Renaissance party, during the 2025 IWD Paris demonstration.
