= Gilles Clavreul =

French civil servant (born 1973)

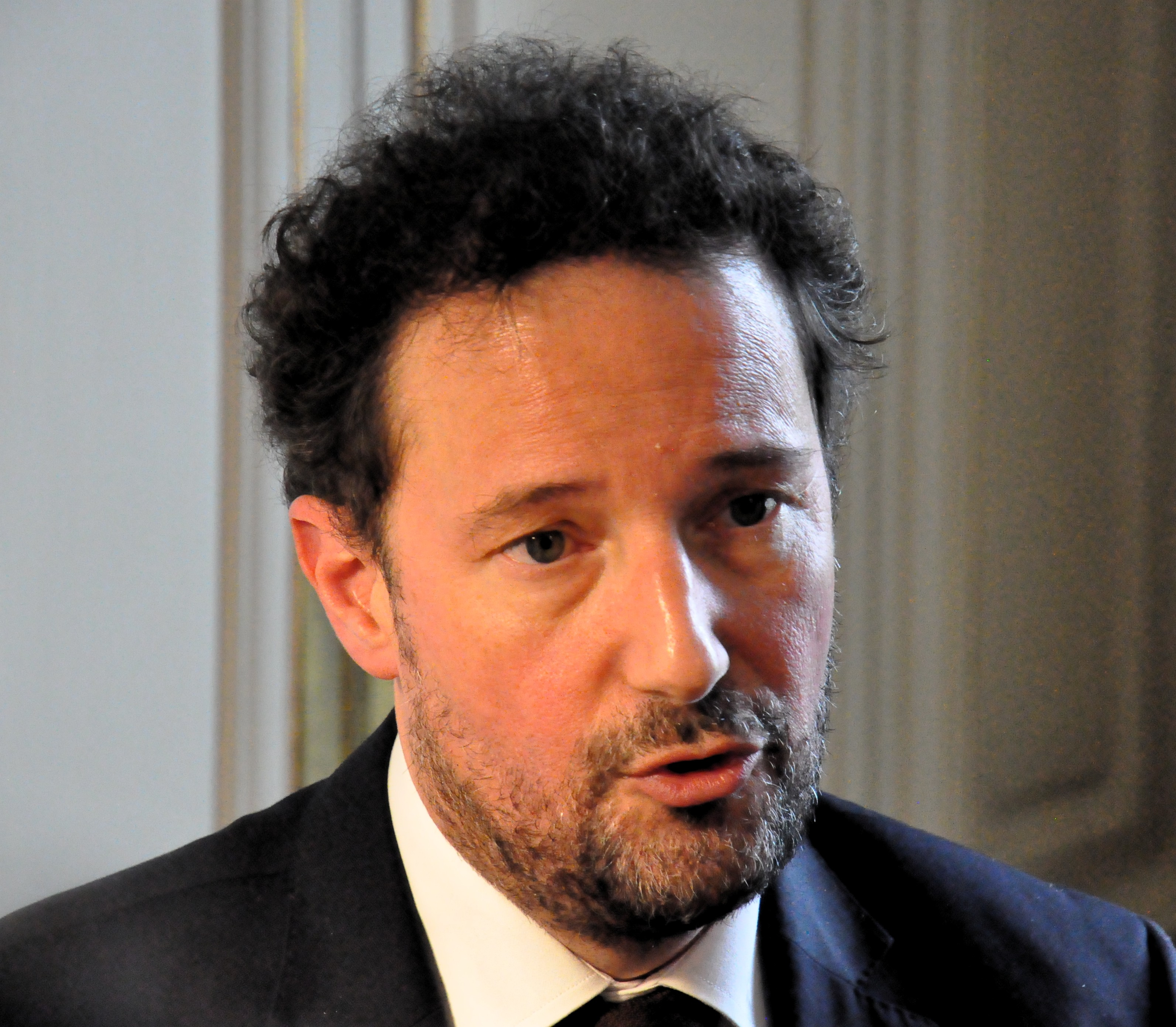
- Clavreul in 2024

Prefect of Landes
- Incumbent
- Assumed office 26 March 2025
- Preceded by: Françoise Taheri

Personal details
- Born: 29 August 1973 (age 52)
- Parent: Jean Clavreul (father)
- Relatives: Roger Diamantis (uncle)

Gilles Clavreul (born 29 August 1973) is a French civil servant who has been serving as prefect of Landes since 2025. From 2014 to 2017, he served as interministerial delegate for racism, antisemitism and homophobia. In 2016, he co-founded Printemps républicain.
