= Nietzsche, se créer liberté =

2010 comic book by Maximilien Le Roy

- Date: 19 March 2010
- Page count: 128 pages
- Publisher: Le Lombard

Creative team
- Writers: Maximilien Le Roy and Michel Onfray
- Artist: Maximilien Le Roy

Original publication
- Language: French
- ISBN: 9782803626502

Nietzsche, se créer liberté (lit. 'Nietzsche, creating oneself freedom') is a comic book by Maximilien Le Roy. It is a biography of the German philosopher Friedrich Nietzsche, following his life from childhood until his death. It is based on an unfilmed screenplay by Michel Onfray.

Le Lombard published Nietzsche, se créer liberté on 19 March 2010. Critics reacted positively to the book's visuals but wrote that it can be inaccessible or disturbing for some readers.

== Background ==
Nietzsche, se créer liberté is based on L'Innocence du devenir, a script by the philosopher Michel Onfray, originally written for an unrealised film about the German philosopher Friedrich Nietzsche. Maximilien Le Roy, aged 24 at the time Nietzsche, se créer liberté was published, had become interested in Nietzsche a few years earlier and considered making a comic book based on Thus Spoke Zarathustra, but decided the project was too advanced. He encountered Onfray's text and made some sketches based on it that he sent to Onfray for approval, before he adapted it into a comic book. The book was finished and published about a year and a half later.

For research, Le Roy travelled for two weeks in Germany, Italy and Switzerland to see locations relevant in Nietzsche's life. He visited Nietzsche museums along the way, looked at Nietzsche's letters and read several biographies. The drawing style was inspired by paintings by Vincent van Gogh, Paul Gauguin and Paul Cézanne, as part of an ambition to express Nietzsche's personality through images and to avoid a heaviness Le Roy associates with Franco-Belgian comics.

== Plot ==
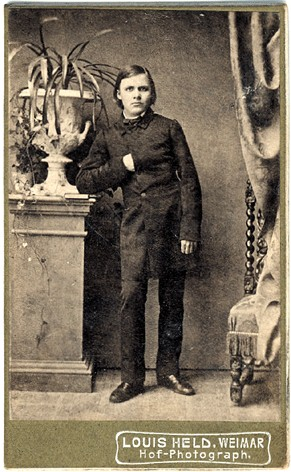
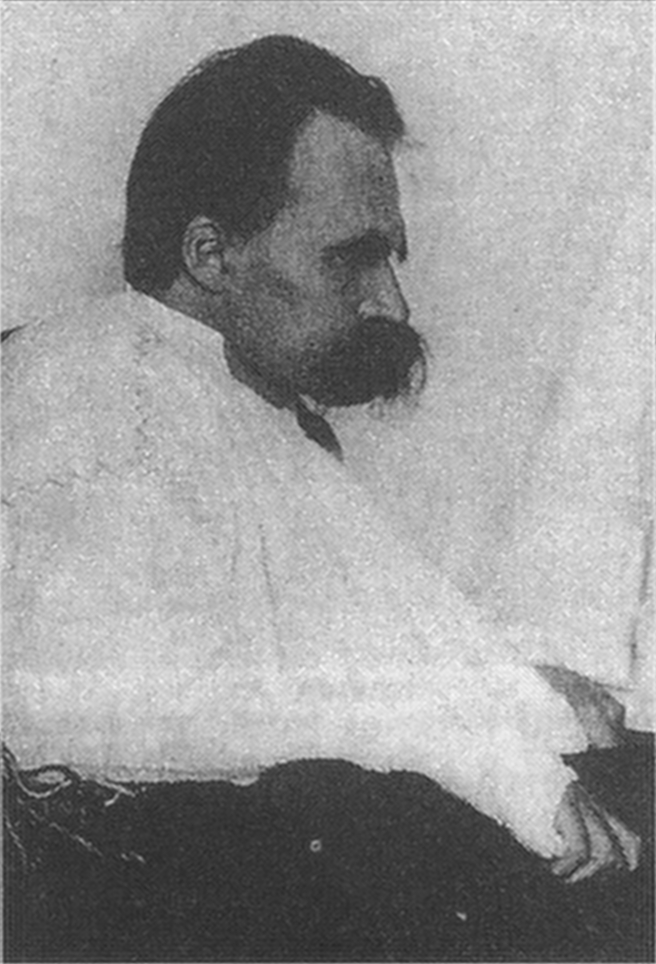
Nietzsche in 1861 and 1899

The book portrays Nietzsche from childhood to old age. It covers his rebellion from his family's wish that he should become a pastor, his time as a young man in Bonn, his youthful interest in duelling and in Richard Wagner's music, and his discovery and eventual rejection of Arthur Schopenhauer's philosophy. As a young professor of philology at the University of Basel, Nietzsche becomes scandalous with his rebellious attitude, poetic ambitions and rejection of Christianity. He develops a philosophy where man needs to create new values, beyond Christian morals and without the dichotomy of good and evil. The book portrays the increasing mental illness and effects from syphilis at the end of Nietzsche's life, until his death at the age of 55.

== Reception ==
Laurence Le Saux of BoDoï wrote that Le Roy shows "his full graphic power", portraying Nietzsche's gradual descent to mental illness with warm colours and flat colour spaces. Télérama wrote that the project sounded like a bad idea, but that the impression quickly changed while reading, and that the drawings "explode" along with the chronological and stripped-down but not simplified portrayal of Nietzsche's outer and inner life.

Anthony Palou of Le Figaro called the book "a bit grotesque" and a work that will appeal to readers of Nietzsche but not general comic-book fans. Olivier Hervé of Planète BD called the book "pleasant if not totally accessible", as it contains parts that can be disturbing for people unfamiliar with the subject. Hervé wrote that some parts may annoy scholars and that Onfray tries to "rehabilitate" Nietzsche's philosophy by portraying him as a free spirit and a lover of truth.
