= Université populaire de Caen =

Educational institution in Caen, France

People's University of Caen
- Université populaire de Caen
- Established: October 2008; 18 years ago
- Founder: Michel Onfray
- Location: Caen, France

The Université populaire de Caen (Popular University or People's University of Caen) is a free university created in October 2002 by Michel Onfray in the north-western French city of Caen. It functions on a guiding principle of exemption from fees. Access to the Popular University does not require any academic qualifications, and is open to all. It does not have any examinations nor does it award diplomas.

== Teaching venues ==
The seminars of the university take place in the following locations:

- Tocqueville amphitheatre, University of Caen
- Mancel coffee, Caen Castle
- Museum of the Fine arts of Caen, Caen Castle
- Room in the Panta Theatre, Caen

== See also ==
- Collège international de philosophie
