= Faire le mur =

2010 comic book by Maximilien Le Roy

- Date: 21 April 2010
- Page count: 103 pages
- Publisher: Casterman

Creative team
- Writers: Maximilien Le Roy
- Artists: Maximilien Le Roy

Original publication
- Language: French
- ISBN: 9782203028791

Faire le mur (lit. 'Make the wall', figuratively 'Sneak out') is a 2010 French comic book by Maximilien Le Roy. It is about the 22-year-old Palestinian Mahmoud Abu Srour who lives in the Aida Camp in the West Bank, where his family runs a small grocery store. He meets a French female student and agrees to accompany her to her sister in Israeli territory, for which he needs to cross the West Bank Wall.

Le Roy visited Palestine in 2008 and 2009 and Faire le mur was one of three comic books about the Israeli–Palestinian conflict he published in 2009–2010. In 2014, he tried to visit Israel for a comics festival, but was stopped at the airport, interrogated for four hours and told he was not allowed to enter the country for the next ten years.
