= Atheist Manifesto: The Case Against Christianity, Judaism, and Islam =

2005 book by Michel Onfray

Atheist Manifesto
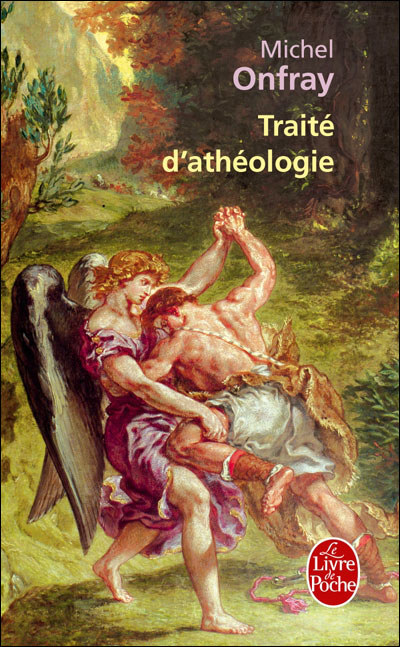
- Jacob Wrestling with the Angel, by Delacroix, on the cover of the French-language paperback edition (Traité d'athéologie)
- Author: Michel Onfray
- Language: French
- Subject: Atheism, criticism of religion
- Publisher: Éditions Grasset
- Publication date: 2005
- Publication place: France
- Pages: 281 pp
- ISBN: 2-246-64801-7

Atheist Manifesto: The Case Against Christianity, Judaism, and Islam (French: Traité d'athéologie) is a 2005 book by French author Michel Onfray. According to Onfray, the term "athéologie" is taken from a project of a series of books written and compiled by Georges Bataille under the vocable La Somme athéologique, which was ultimately never completed.

The book was translated into English in 2007 with the titles Atheist Manifesto: The Case Against Christianity, Judaism, and Islam and In Defence of Atheism: The Case Against Christianity, Judaism and Islam.

== Summary ==
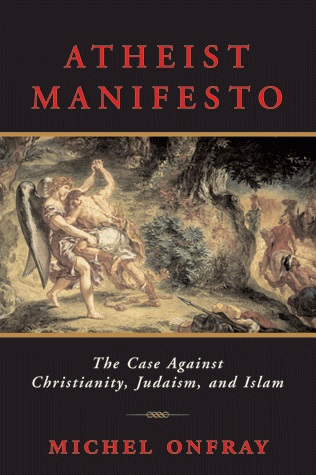
Cover of the 2007 English edition of Traité d'athéologie by Michel Onfray (translated by Jeremy Leggatt under the name Atheist Manifesto: The Case Against Christianity, Judaism, and Islam), published by Arcade (originally published in French by Grasset in 2005). The cover uses a detail of Eugène Delacroix's painting La Lutte de Jacob avec l'Ange (1861).

In the first part "Athéologie", the author develops Nietzsche's doctrine, but criticizing his view on the death of God. Then he shows how the concept of atheist was originally a pejorative connotation and concluded that the survival of Christianity in the form of Christian atheism on the Judeo-Christian morality.

The second part "Monotheisme" is a structural analysis of the three Abrahamic religions in which the author highlights common features, including the contempt for the body and matter, denial of progress and science, misanthropy and hatred of the intellect.

The third part "Christianisme" challenges the existence of Jesus which would be based on secondhand testimonies, asserts that the Apostle Paul, described as neurotic and hysterical, exploited the character of Jesus to lead the world in his hatred of the flesh, then explains how, opportunistically, Emperor Constantine made Christianity a state religion.

In the last part "Théocratie", the author explains the relationship of the three monotheistic religions with political power, and describes their worst abuses. Then he shows several of contradictions in the sacred books and considers that these texts are often used to justify evil. He depicts Islam notably through the Iranian revolution and the regime of the Ayatollah Khomeini.

The book concludes by proposing a new atheism or secularism that he called "post-Christian" or "post-modern" in which God and the morality which it relates are gone.

=== Jean Meslier ===
In his book In Defense of Atheism (2007), Michel Onfray describes the priest Jean Meslier as the first person to write an entire text in support of atheism:

For the first time (but how long will it take us to acknowledge this?) in the history of ideas, a philosopher had dedicated a whole book to the question of atheism. He professed it, demonstrated it, arguing and quoting, sharing his reading and his reflections, and seeking confirmation from his own observations of the everyday world. His title sets it out clearly: Memoir of the Thoughts and Feelings of Jean Meslier; and so does his subtitle: Clear and Evident Demonstrations of the Vanity and Falsity of All the Religions of the World. The book appeared in 1729, after his death. Meslier had spent the greater part of his life working on it. The history of true atheism had begun.

=== Ferreira ===
Prior to announcing Meslier as the first atheist philosopher, Onfray considers and dismisses Cristóvão Ferreira, a Portuguese and former Jesuit who renounced his faith under Japanese torture in 1633 and went on to write a book titled The Deception Revealed. However, Onfray decides that Ferreira was not such a good candidate as Meslier, since Ferreira converted to Zen Buddhism.

== Reception ==
The book sold over 200,000 copies.

Two other books were written shortly after its publication as replies to its arguments: L'Anti-traité d'athéologie, Le système Onfray mis à nu by Matthieu Baumier, and Dieu avec esprit: Réponse à Michel Onfray by Irène Fernandez.

The Institut d'études de l'Islam et des sciences du monde musulman (Institute for the Study of Islam and the Muslim World Science) stated: "Ultimately, the real inspiration of the Book of M[ichel] O[nfray] seems to lie in a kind of fashion, "the Black Book" and its corollary, the charge of totalitarianism. (...) The information is mostly false or expected, and its function is to reinforce the frames of a thought on the rise: The Clash of Civilizations and the necessary fight against Islam."

The Catholic magazine Esprit & Vie describes the Traité d'athéologie as an "atypical book, nourished by a visceral hatred against religion in general (...) It brings nothing fundamentally new compared to Nietzsche's work, if not the author's crazy contention to stand almost as the first true atheist."

Among the "incalculable number of contradictions and improbabilities in the body of the text of the synoptic Gospels", two claims are made: crucifixion victims were not laid to rest in tombs, and in any case, Jews were not crucified in this period. John Dickson, from the Centre for Public Christianity, has said that Philo, writing about the time of Jesus, tells us that sometimes the Romans handed the bodies of crucifixion victims over to family members for proper burial. Josephus remarks: "the Jews are so careful about funeral rites that even malefactors who have been sentenced to crucifixion are taken down and buried before sunset". Regarding the second claim, Dickson calls this a "clear historical blunder".

By contrast, the journal of popular science Automates intelligents praised the book, saying it "reads like a novel. (...) In a very pleasing style, it takes on every aspect of the blindness and human evil produced by religions. (...) However, the journal also said: "It can be reproached to having limited to a critique of religion (...), but to have offered nothing concrete to the spirits who are in search of an alternative adapted to our times." "Scientific analysis of the belief" is missing. "We would have also appreciated that Michel Onfray mentions many modern scientists who honor the scientific materialism and atheism."

== See also ==
- Antireligion
- Antitheism
- Atheism
- Criticism of religion
- Egoist anarchism
- Hedonism
- Metaphysical naturalism
