= Printemps républicain =

Printemps républicain is a French political movement founded in 2016 by Laurent Bouvet and Gilles Clavreul. It was chaired from 2017 to 2023 by Amine El Khatmi, and since 2023 by Marika Bret.

According to its manifesto, it intends to fight against "the far right and political Islamism" and defend secularism "challenged from all sides, manipulated for political ends by some, attacked for religious ends by others, ignored by many out of indifference."

Initially asserting itself on the left, it has since declared itself to favor the divide opposing "republicans to identitarians and communitarians" rather than the left-right divide. Several left-wing observers have viewed its rhetoric as Islamophobic.

A fictionalised version of the Printemps républicain is at the centre of the 2024 satirical novel Les derniers jours du Parti socialiste by Aurélien Bellanger.
