= Gauguin: Off the Beaten Track =

2013 comic book by Maximilien Le Roy and Christophe Gaultier

Gauguin: Off the Beaten Track (Gauguin, loin de la route)
- Date: 15 November 2013
- Page count: 88 pages
- Publisher: Le Lombard

Creative team
- Writer: Maximilien Le Roy
- Artist: Christophe Gaultier
- Colorist: Marie Galopin

Original publication
- Language: French
- ISBN: 9782803632015

Translation
- Publisher: Europe Comics
- Date: 8 June 2016

Gauguin: Off the Beaten Track (French: Gauguin, loin de la route) is a French comic book with script by Maximilien Le Roy and art by Christophe Gaultier, published by Le Lombard on 15 November 2013. It is about the last years of the painter Paul Gauguin on the Marquesas Islands.

== Plot ==
The story is told from the perspective of Victor Segalen, a French physician and archaeologist who arrives on the Marquesas Islands in French Polynesia in 1903. He is curious about the painter Paul Gauguin, who settled on the islands a couple of years earlier, having rejected the materialism and superficiality he associated with metropolitan France. Gauguin's colonial life has been filled with alcohol, sex and depression, and he soon dies. Segalen traces Gauiguin's last two years and his relationship to the native population.

== Reception ==
Le Parisien called the book "a very beautiful portrait of an artist", made with lively drawings. Bénédicte de Badereau of BoDoï wrote that the thick lines and saturated colours create a suitable atmosphere and evoke Polynesian tattoos. Badereau wrote that the script by Maximilien Le Roy sheds light on little known aspects of the subject's life, like Le Roy had done in Thoreau: A Sublime Life (2012), but that the book might frustrate those with little prior knowledge of Gauguin's work. Sarah Dehove of Planète BD wrote that the book portrays the "monster" Gauguin as a complex character, taking its time to present a personality more than a story.
