= L'Ordre libertaire =

2012 book by Michel Onfray

- Author: Michel Onfray
- Language: French
- Subject: Albert Camus
- Publisher: Flammarion
- Publication date: 4 January 2012
- Publication place: France
- Pages: 608
- ISBN: 9782081264410

L'ordre libertaire : La vie philosophique d'Albert Camus (lit. 'The Libertarian Order: The Philosophical Life of Albert Camus') is a 2012 book by the French writer Michel Onfray. It is about the life and philosophy of the writer Albert Camus, whom Onfray presents as hedonistic, libertarian and anti-totalitarian.

In Le Monde, Olivier Todd criticised the book for politicising Camus at the expense of his literary works, which Todd called a typically French tendency, and for being overly concerned with attacking Jean-Paul Sartre.
