= Decline and Fall of the Freudian Empire =

1985 book by Hans Eysenck

- Cover of the first edition
- Author: Hans Eysenck
- Language: English
- Subjects: Sigmund Freud; Psychoanalysis
- Publisher: Viking Press
- Publication date: 1985
- Publication place: United Kingdom
- Media type: Print (Hardcover and Paperback)
- Pages: 224 (1986 Pelican edition)
- ISBN: 0-14-022562-5 (1986 Pelican edition)

Decline and Fall of the Freudian Empire (1985; second edition 2004) is a book by the psychologist Hans Eysenck, in which the author criticizes Sigmund Freud, the founder of psychoanalysis. Eysenck argues that psychoanalysis is unscientific. The book received both positive and negative reviews. Eysenck has been criticized for his discussion of the physician Josef Breuer's treatment of his patient Anna O., whom Eysenck argues suffered from tuberculous meningitis.

== Summary ==
Eysenck argues that psychoanalysis is unscientific and that its theories are based on no legitimate base of observation or experiment and have the status only of speculation. Eysenck argues that the veracity of psychoanalysis is testable through traditional empirical means, and that in all areas where such tests have been carried out it has failed. Eysenck calls Freud, "a genius, not of science, but of propaganda, not of rigorous proof, but of persuasion, not of the design of experiments, but of literary art." According to Eysenck, Freud set back the study of psychology and psychiatry by around fifty years. Eysenck argues that the dreams Freud cites in The Interpretation of Dreams (1899) do not really support his theories, and that Freud's examples actually disprove his dream theory. Eysenck calls the psychoanalyst Ernest Jones' The Life and Work of Sigmund Freud (1953-1957) the "most famous" biography of Freud, but sees it as "more a mythology than a history, leaving out as it does nearly all the warts and making many alterations to the portrait by suppressing data and items which might reflect unfavourably on Freud." Eysenck accepts Elizabeth Thornton's argument, made in Freud and Cocaine (1983), also published as The Freudian Fallacy, that Breuer's patient Anna O. suffered from tuberculous meningitis.

== Publication history ==
Decline and Fall of the Freudian Empire was first published by Viking Press in 1985. The book was published by Pelican Books in 1986. In 2004, a revised edition with a preface by Hans Eysenck's widow, Sybil Eysenck, was published by Transaction Publishers.

== Reception ==
Decline and Fall of the Freudian Empire received positive reviews from Paul Stuewe in Quill & Quire and Coline Covington in the Journal of Analytical Psychology, and negative reviews from David Berry in New Statesman and Vernon Hamilton in the British Journal of Psychology. The book was also reviewed by the psychiatrist Anthony Clare in Nature, the psychologist Stuart Sutherland in the Times Higher Education Supplement, Chris Brand in Behaviour Research and Therapy, and Michael H. Stone in the American Journal of Psychiatry.

Stuewe called Eysenck's approach to testing psychoanalytic theory "rigorously scientific". He concluded that while Decline and Fall of the Freudian Empire was not likely to change the mind of those who accepted psychoanalysis, it was nevertheless "a controversial and largely convincing challenge to the scientific validity of psychoanalysis and such a forcefully written and lucidly argued one that it will certainly attract a good deal of public attention." Covington credited Eysenck with pointing to the existence of alternative theories and "evidence suggesting which theory may be better in accounting for the established facts." Berry dismissed the book as an "ill-considered, illogical banality". Hamilton described the work as a popularization of Eysenck's articles and books criticizing psychoanalysis, and wrote that it was "not really meant for academic consumption." He criticized Eysenck's account of psychoanalytic therapy, writing that it bore little resemblance to modern psychoanalytic therapy, and wrote that Eysenck evaluated psychoanalysis using experimental evidence that was not methodologically adequate, or which in some cases actually provided weak support for psychoanalytic concepts such as repression.

The psychologist Stephen Frosh described Decline and Fall of the Freudian Empire as one of a number of books in which Eysenck acted as a "propagandist" for the view that psychoanalysis is unscientific. He noted that Freud would not have agreed with Eysenck that psychoanalysis is a matter of "literary art" rather than science. The sociologist Barry Richards described the book as "vitriolic" and lacking in sophistication. The psychologist Malcolm Macmillan noted that Eysenck was one of several authors to have argued that Anna O. suffered from an organic malady. He observed that these authors provide conflicting accounts of what malady Anna O. suffered from, and argued that establishing any retrospective diagnosis with certainty is difficult.

The author Richard Webster suggested that Decline and Fall of the Freudian Empire contains many cogent criticisms of Freud. However, he criticized Eysenck for uncritically accepting Thornton's argument that Breuer's patient Anna O. suffered from tuberculous meningitis. Sybil Eysenck wrote that the "real strength" of Decline and Fall of the Freudian Empire was that it "not only cast doubt on traditional psychotherapy and psychoanalysis" but suggested behavior therapy as an alternative to them, a position in her view justified by subsequent research. She credited her husband with considerable courage in writing the book, and identified it as her favorite among his books.

== See also ==
- Le Crépuscule d'une idole
