= Les derniers jours du Parti socialiste =

2024 novel by Aurélien Bellanger

- Author: Aurélien Bellanger
- Language: French
- Publisher: Éditions du Seuil
- Publication date: 19 August 2024
- Publication place: France
- Pages: 480
- ISBN: 9782021571165

Les derniers jours du Parti socialiste (lit. 'The Last Days of the Socialist Party') is a novel by the French writer Aurélien Bellanger, published by éditions du Seuil on 19 August 2024.

== Plot ==
The book is a satirical roman à clef about intrigues around the French Socialist Party. It follows the party apparatchik Grémond, who following the January 2015 Île-de-France attacks and November 2015 Paris attacks teams up with two philosophers, Taillevent and Frayère, to found a secularist movement with Islam as its primary target.

== Major themes ==
Bellanger described his purpose with the book: "I have written a book that tells how a heresy of the Socialist Party, the Printemps républicain, surrounded by a small group of mediocre intellectuals, made the victory of the far right possible in France." More generally, he says he wanted to use satire to investigate how the antiracist left has decayed. The main character Grémond corresponds to Laurent Bouvet, founder of the Printemps républicain. The philosophers Taillevent and Frayère are based on Raphaël Enthoven and Michel Onfray, respectively. Other real people portrayed include Caroline Fourest, as Véronique Bourny, and Emmanuel Macron, as "le Chanoine" (lit. 'the Canon'). Manuel Valls appears under his real name.

== Reception ==
Caroline Pernes of Télérama called the novel a "grand politico-historical epic, deliciously cynical" with "a slew of easily identifiable characters". Harrison Stetler of The Times Literary Supplement described it as an "ambitious novel of ideas", noticeably influenced by Michel Houellebecq in its narrative mode. He wrote that it mocks recognisable French public figures and portrays how the country imports "American ideas such as structural racism", loses its "vital centre" and suffers from "a revolt of France's cultural and political elites".
