= Thoreau: A Sublime Life =

Biographical comic about Henry Thoreau

Thoreau: A Sublime Life (Thoreau : La vie sublime)
- Date: 31 August 2012
- Page count: 88 pages
- Publisher: Le Lombard

Creative team
- Writers: Maximilien Le Roy
- Artists: A. Dan

Original publication
- Language: French
- ISBN: 9782803631001

Translation
- Publisher: NBM Publishing
- Date: 2016
- ISBN: 978-1-68112-026-3

Thoreau: A Sublime Life (French: Thoreau : La vie sublime) is a biographical comic book about the American philosopher Henry David Thoreau. It was written by Maximilien Le Roy and has art by A. Dan. The original French version was published by Le Lombard in 2012 and the English translation was published by NBM Publishing in 2016.

== Synopsis ==
Henry David Thoreau (1817–1862) is portrayed as a person who lived an active and politically engaged life. He operated a pencil factory his father owned. He was an outspoken abolitionist and assisted escaping slaves. He refused to pay taxes to the United States as a protest against slavery and the Mexican–American War. He sympathized with the abolitionist John Brown and met him in person. He also lived for two years in a cabin at the Walden Pond in Concord, Massachusetts, for which he later became remembered due to his book Walden.

== Reception ==
Benoît Cassel of Planète BD wrote that the worldview portrayed in the book should appeal to those who enjoyed the films Into the Wild and Dead Poets Society. He wrote that it succeeds to present a political philosophy in comic-book format in a sober, didactic and non-idolizing way, where the "semi-realistic" drawing style is in "perfect accord with Thoreau's spirit". Mélanie Monroy of BoDoï wrote that the landscape drawings make the reader feel the joy of being in contact with nature. She wrote that the book sheds light on less known parts of Thoreau's life, but fails to make him seem like a person of flesh and blood. Quoting from the foreword, where Le Roy writes that he wanted to present Thoreau as a useful model for contemporary subversion, Monroy wrote that this ambition failed. Publishers Weekly called the book a "powerful and impassioned graphic biography" that restores "a luminous fire" to Thoreau.
