= Michel Onfray =

French writer and philosopher (born 1959)

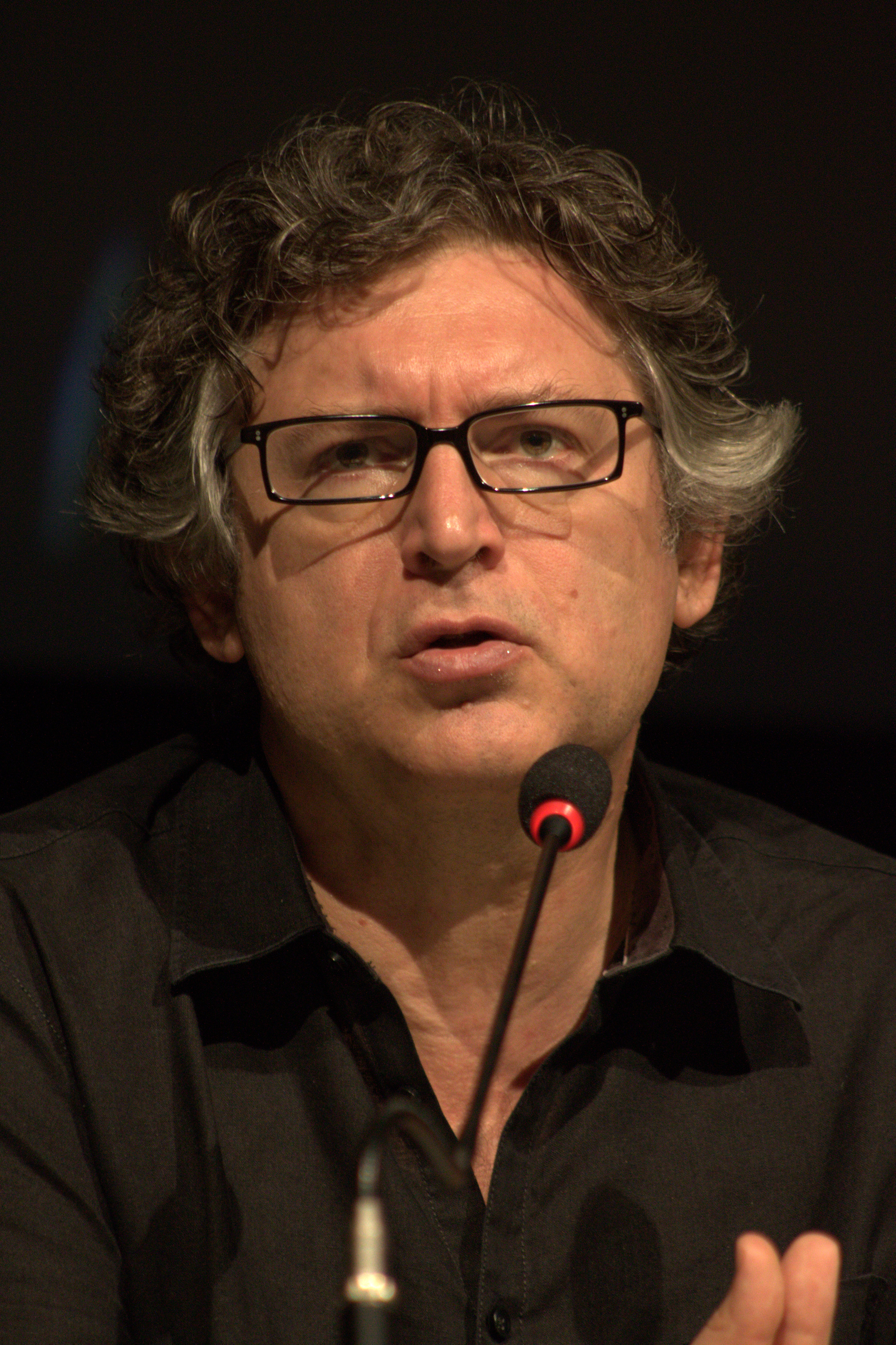
- Onfray in 2012
- Born: 1 January 1959 (age 67); Argentan, France

Education
- Education: University of Caen Lower Normandy

Philosophical work
- Era: Contemporary philosophy
- Region: Western philosophy
- School: Materialism; Hedonism; Epicureanism; Atheism; Consequentialism; Anarchism; Patriotism; Mutualism
- Main interests: Atheism, religion, ethics, Cyrenaic school, hedonism, Epicureanism, pleasure, history of philosophy, materialism, aesthetics, bioethics
- Notable ideas: The principle of Gulliver (le principe de Gulliver)

Michel Onfray (French: [miʃɛl ɔ̃fʁɛ]; born 1 January 1959) is a French writer and philosopher with a hedonistic, epicurean and atheist worldview. A highly prolific author on philosophy, he has written over 100 books. His philosophy is mainly influenced by such thinkers as Nietzsche, Epicurus, the Cynic and Cyrenaic schools, as well as French materialism. He has gained notoriety for writing such works as Atheist Manifesto, Le Crépuscule d'une idole, A Hedonist Manifesto, Politique du rebelle: traité de résistance et d'insoumission, Physiologie de Georges Palante, portrait d'un nietzchéen de gauche, and La sculpture de soi for which he won the annual Prix Médicis in 1993.

Onfray is often regarded as being left-wing; however, some observers have stated that he has right-wing tendencies. He has become appreciated by some far-right circles, notably with his sovereignist magazine Front populaire.

== Life ==
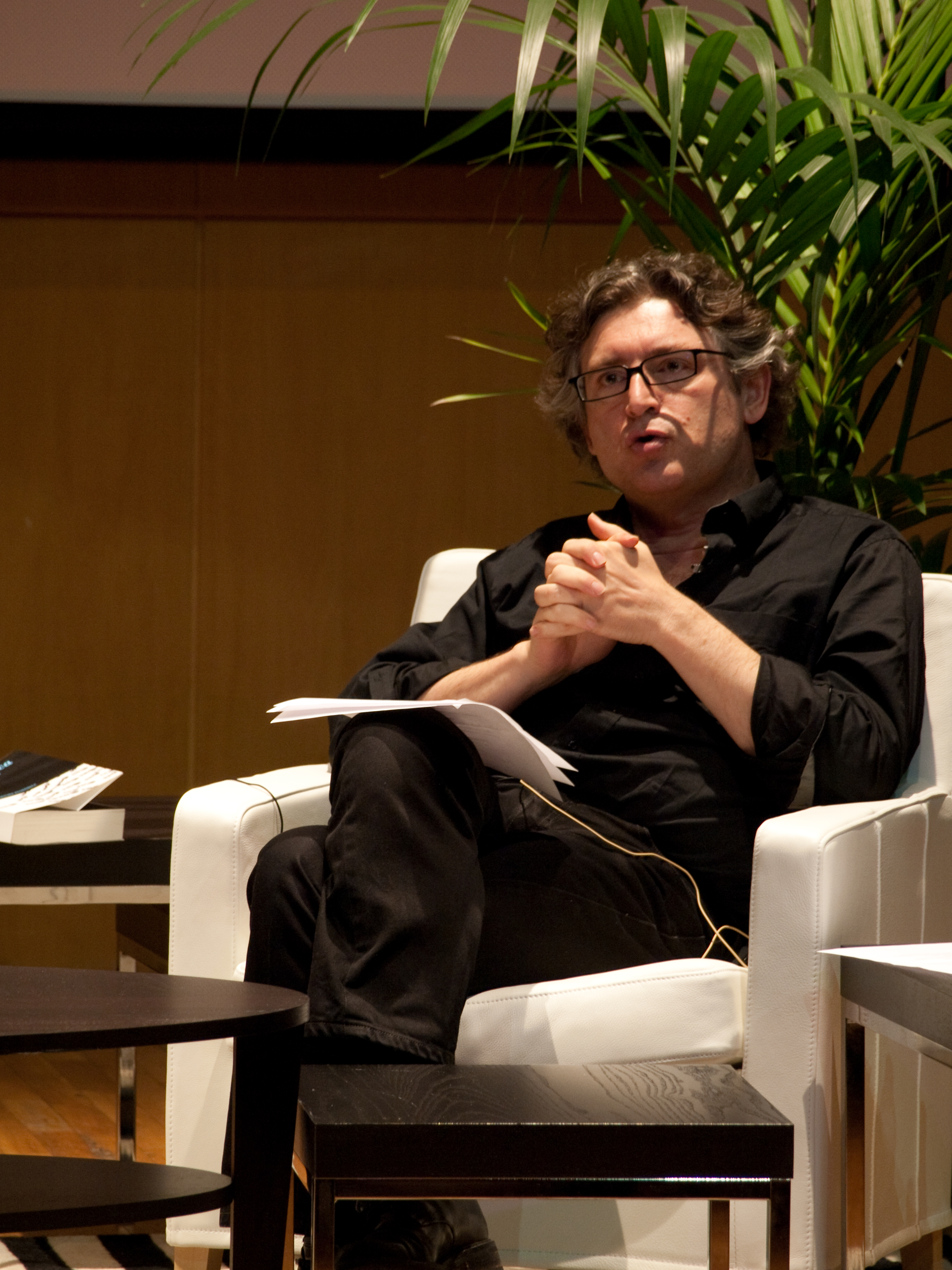
Onfray in Spain in 2009

Born in Argentan to a family of Norman farmers, Onfray was sent to a weekly Catholic boarding school in Giel from ages 10 to 14. This was a solution many parents in France adopted at the time when they lived far from the village school or had working hours that made it too hard or too expensive to transport their children to and from school daily. The young Onfray, however, did not appreciate his new environment, which he describes as a place of suffering. Onfray went on to graduate with a teaching degree in philosophy. He taught this subject to senior students at a high school that concentrated on technical degrees in Caen between 1983 and 2002. At that time, he and his supporters established the Université populaire de Caen, proclaiming its foundation on a free-of-charge basis and on the manifesto written by Onfray in 2004 (La communauté philosophique).

Onfray was a secondary school philosophy teacher for two decades until he resigned in 2002 to establish a tuition-free Université populaire (People's University) at Caen, at which he and several colleagues teach philosophy and other subjects.

"The Université populaire, which is open to all who cannot access the state university system, and on principle does not accept any money from the State—Onfray uses the profits from his books to help finance it—has had enormous success. Based on Onfray's book La Communauté philosophique: Manifeste pour l'Université populaire (2004), the original UP now has imitators in Picardy, Arras, Lyon, Narbonne, and Le Mans, with five more in preparation."

"The national public radio network France Culture annually broadcasts his course of lectures to the Université Populaire on philosophical themes."

Onfray is an atheist and author of Atheist Manifesto (Traité d'Athéologie), which "became the number one best-selling nonfiction book in France for months when it was published in the Spring of 2005 (the word 'athéologie' Onfray borrowed from Georges Bataille and dedicated to Raoul Vaneigem who had defended freedom of speech, including Holocaust denial, in Nothing is sacred, everything can be said. The book repeated its popular French success in Italy, where it was published in September 2005 and quickly soared to number one on Italy's bestseller lists."

His book Le crépuscule d'une idole : L'affabulation freudienne (The Twilight of an Idol: The Freudian Confabulation), published in 2010, has been the subject of considerable controversy in France because of its criticism of Sigmund Freud. He recognises Freud as a philosopher but brings attention to the considerable cost of Freud's treatments and casts doubts on the effectiveness of his methods.

In 2015, Onfray published Cosmos, the first book of a trilogy. Onfray considers ironically that it constitutes his "very first book".

== Philosophy ==
Onfray writes that there is no philosophy without self-psychoanalysis. He describes himself as an atheist and considers theistic religion to be indefensible.

=== View on the history of Western philosophy and philosophical project ===
Onfray has published nine books under a project of history of philosophy called Counter-History of Philosophy. In each of these books Onfray deals with a particular historical period in Western philosophy. The series of books is composed of the titles:

I. Les Sagesses Antiques (2006) (on western antiquity),
II. Le Christianisme hédoniste (2006) (on Christian hedonism from the Renaissance period),
III. Les libertins baroques (2007) (on libertine thought from the Baroque era),
IV. Les Ultras des Lumières (2007) (on radical enlightenment thought),
V. L'Eudémonisme social (2008) (on radical utilitarian and eudaimonistic thought),
VI. Les Radicalités existentielles (2009) (on 19th and 20th century radical existentialist thinkers) and
VII. La construction du surhomme: Jean-Marie Guyau, Friedrich Nietzsche (on Guyau's and Nietzsche's philosophy in relation to the concept of the Übermensch).
VIII. Les Freudiens hérétiques (2013).
IX. Les Consciences réfractaires (2013).

In an interview, Onfray established his view on the history of philosophy:

There is in fact a multitude of ways to practice philosophy, but out of this multitude, the dominant historiography picks one tradition among others and makes it the truth of philosophy: that is to say the idealist, spiritualist lineage compatible with the Judeo-Christian world view. From that point on, anything that crosses this partial – in both senses of the word – view of things finds itself dismissed. This applies to nearly all non-Western philosophies, Oriental wisdom in particular, but also sensualist, empirical, materialist, nominalist, hedonistic currents and everything that can be put under the heading of "anti-Platonic philosophy". Philosophy that comes down from the heavens is the kind that – from Plato to Levinas by way of Kant and Christianity – needs a world behind the scenes to understand, explain and justify this world. The other line of force rises from the earth because it is satisfied with the given world, which is already so much.

"His mission is to rehabilitate materialist and sensualist thinking and use it to re-examine our relationship to the world. Approaching philosophy as a reflection of each individual's personal experience, Onfray inquires into the capabilities of the body and its senses and calls on us to celebrate them through music, painting, and fine cuisine."

=== Hedonism ===
Onfray defines hedonism "as an introspective attitude to life based on taking pleasure yourself and pleasuring others, without harming yourself or anyone else." "Onfray's philosophical project is to define an ethical hedonism, a joyous utilitarianism, and a generalized aesthetic of sensual materialism that explores how to use the brain's and the body's capacities to their fullest extent – while restoring philosophy to a useful role in art, politics, and everyday life and decisions."

Onfray's works "have explored the philosophical resonances and components of (and challenges to) science, painting, gastronomy, sex and sensuality, bioethics, wine, and writing. His most ambitious project is his projected six-volume Counter-History of Philosophy", three of which have been published. Onfray writes:

In opposition to the ascetic ideal advocated by the dominant school of thought, hedonism suggests identifying the highest good with your own pleasure and that of others; the one must never be indulged at the expense of sacrificing the other. Obtaining this balance – my pleasure at the same time as the pleasure of others – presumes that we approach the subject from different angles – political, ethical, aesthetic, erotic, bioethical, pedagogical, historiographical....

His philosophy aims for "micro-revolutions", or "revolutions of the individual and small groups of like-minded people who live by his hedonistic, libertarian values."

In A Hedonist Manifesto: The Power to Exist (La puissance d'exister: Manifeste hédoniste) Onfray claims that the political dimension of hedonism runs from Epicurus to John Stuart Mill to Jeremy Bentham and Claude Adrien Helvétius. Political hedonism aims to create the greatest happiness for the greatest numbers.

In La Raison gourmande, he analyses the relation between philosophers and wine: Gaston Bachelard and Burgundy, Michel Serres and Château d'Yquem. He names also the "alcoholic philosophers": Friedrich Nietzsche, Jean-Paul Sartre, Simone de Beauvoir, Gilles Deleuze, Guy Debord and Raoul Vaneigem, in particular, to whom he dedicated his Atheist Manifesto (2005).

=== Religion ===
Onfray has been involved in promoting the work of Jean Meslier, an 18th-century French Catholic priest who was discovered, upon his death, to have written a book-length philosophical essay promoting atheism.

In Atheist Manifesto, Onfray states that among the "incalculable number of contradictions and improbabilities in the body of the text of the synoptic Gospels" two claims are made: crucifixion victims were not laid to rest in tombs, and in any case, Jews were not crucified in this period. The historian John Dickson, of Macquarie University, has said that Philo of Alexandria, who wrote about the time of Jesus, noted that the Romans sometimes handed the bodies of crucifixion victims over to family members for proper burial. The Roman Jewish historian Flavius Josephus even remarks: "Jews are so careful about funeral rites that even malefactors who have been sentenced to crucifixion are taken down and buried before sunset." Regarding the second claim, Dickson calls this a "clear historical blunder".

In Onfray's latest book, Décadence, he argued for Christ myth theory, which is a hypothesis that Jesus was not a historical person. Onfray based this on the fact that, other than in the New Testament, Jesus is barely mentioned in accounts of the period.

In July 2021, Onfray criticised Pope Francis's apostolic letter Traditionis custodes by arguing that the Tridentine Mass embodies “the heritage of the genealogical time of our civilization".

== Political views ==
In the 2002 election, Onfray endorsed the French Revolutionary Communist League. In 2007 he conducted an interview with the future French President Nicolas Sarkozy, who, Onfray declared in Philosophie Magazine, was an "ideological enemy".

During a Television interview and as a response to a visit by French president Emmanuel Macron to Algeria in August 2022, Onfray described the ruling regime in Algeria as a "mafia" and asserted that France has no responsibility for the impoverished life of the Algerian people in a country rich in gas and oil because the French had left in 1962. During the interview Onfray said "We know very well that this country has hated us since 1962."

== Reception and influence ==
Asteroid 289992 Onfray, discovered by astronomers at the Saint-Sulpice Observatory in 2005, was named in Onfray's honour. The official naming citation was published by the Minor Planet Center on 16 March 2014 (M.P.C. 87546).

Several authors criticise Onfray for approximations and historical errors contained in several of his works. That is particularly the case of the historians Guillaume Mazeau, Élisabeth Roudinesco, Jean-Marie Salamito with his essay Monsieur Onfray au pays des mythes as well as Ian Birchall.

A fictionalised version of Onfray appears under the name Frayère in the 2024 satirical novel Les derniers jours du Parti socialiste by Aurélien Bellanger.

== Works ==
=== In English ===
- Vladimir Velickovic: new paintings: Marlborough Fine Art, London, 9 January - 1 February 2003. Marlborough Fine Art. 2003. ISBN 978-1-904372-01-1.
- Atheist Manifesto: The Case Against Christianity, Judaism, and Islam. Arcade Publishing. 2007. ISBN 978-1-55970-820-3.
- Appetites for Thought: Philosophers and Food. Reaktion Books. 15 March 2015. ISBN 978-1-78023-455-7.
- A Hedonist Manifesto: The Power to Exist. Columbia University Press. 10 November 2015. ISBN 978-0-231-53836-7.

=== In French ===
- Le Ventre des philosophes. Critique de la raison diététique, Grasset, 1989
- Cynismes. Portrait du philosophe en chien, Grasset, 1990
- L’Art de jouir. Pour un matérialisme hédoniste, Grasset, 1991
- La Sculpture de soi. La Morale esthétique, Grasset, 1993
- Ars Moriendi. Cent petits tableaux sur les avantages et les inconvénients de la mort, Folle Avoine, 1994
- La Raison gourmande. Philosophie du goût, Grasset, 1995
- Les Formes du temps. Théorie du sauternes, Mollat, 1996
- Théorie du corps amoureux. Pour une érotique solaire, Grasset, 2000
- Antimanuel de philosophie. Leçons socratiques et alternatives, Bréal, 2001
- Physiologie de Georges Palante. Pour un nietzschéisme de gauche, Grasset, 2002
- L’Invention du plaisir. Fragments cyrénaïques, LGF, 2002
- Célébration du génie colérique. Tombeau de Pierre Bourdieu, Galilée, 2002
- Féeries anatomiques. Généalogie du corps faustien, Grasset, 2003
- La Communauté philosophique. Manifeste pour l’Université populaire, Galilée, 2004
- Traité d’athéologie. Physique de la métaphysique, Grasset, 2005
- La Sagesse tragique. Du bon usage de Nietzsche, LGF, 2006
- Suite à La Communauté philosophique. Une machine à porter la voix, Galilée, 2006
- La Puissance d’exister. Manifeste hédoniste, Grasset, 2006
- L’Innocence du devenir. La Vie de Frédéric Nietzsche, Galilée, 2008
- Le Songe d’Eichmann. Précédé de : Un kantien chez les nazis, Galilée, 2008
- Le Souci des plaisirs. Construction d’une érotique solaire, Flammarion, 2008
- La Religion du poignard. Éloge de Charlotte Corday, Galilée, 2009
- Le Crépuscule d'une idole. L’Affabulation freudienne, Grasset, 2010
- Apostille au Crépuscule. Pour une psychanalyse non freudienne, Grasset, 2010
- Manifeste hédoniste, Autrement, 2011
- L'Ordre libertaire. La Vie philosophique d’Albert Camus, Flammarion, 2012
- Vies et mort d’un dandy. Construction d’un mythe, Galilée, 2012
- Rendre la raison populaire. Université populaire, mode d’emploi, Autrement, 2012
- Le Canari du nazi. Essais sur la monstruosité, Collectif, Autrement, 2013
- La Raison des sortilèges. Entretiens sur la musique, Autrement, 2013
- Bestiaire nietzschéen. Les Animaux philosophiques, Galilée, 2014
- Haute école. Brève histoire du cheval philosophique, Flammarion, 2015
- Penser l'Islam, Grasset, 2016
- La Force du sexe faible. Contre-histoire de la Révolution française, Autrement, 2016
- Tocqueville et les Apaches, Autrement, 2017
- Vivre une vie philosophique. Thoreau le sauvage, Le Passeur, 2017
- Miroir du nihilisme. Houellebecq éducateur, Galilée, 2017
- Solstice d'hiver : Alain, les Juifs, Hitler et l'Occupation, L'Observatoire, 2018
- Le Deuil de la mélancolie, Robert Laffont 2018
- Brève encyclopédie du monde
  - Cosmos. Une ontologie matérialiste, Flammarion, 2015
  - Décadence. Vie et mort du judéo-christianisme, Flammarion, 2017
  - Sagesse, Savoir vivre au pied d'un volcan, Albin Michel 2019
- Contre-histoire de la littérature
  - Le réel n'a pas eu lieu. Le Principe de Don Quichotte, Autrement, 2014
  - La Passion de la méchanceté. Sur un prétendu divin marquis, Autrement, 2014
- Contre-histoire de la philosophie
  - Les Sagesses antiques, Grasset, 2006
  - Le Christianisme hédoniste, Grasset, 2006
  - Les Libertins baroques, Grasset, 2007
  - Les Ultras des Lumières, Grasset, 2007
  - L’Eudémonisme social, Grasset, 2008
  - Les Radicalités existentielles, Grasset, 2009
  - La Construction du surhomme, Grasset, 2011
  - Les Freudiens hérétiques, Grasset, 2013
  - Les Consciences réfractaires, Grasset, 2013
  - La Pensée postnazie, Grasset, 2018
  - L'Autre pensée 68, Grasset, 2018
- Esthetic
  - L’Œil nomade. La Peinture de Jacques Pasquier, Folle Avoine, 1993
  - Métaphysique des ruines. La Peinture de Monsù Desiderio, Mollat, 1995
  - Splendeur de la catastrophe. La Peinture de Vladimir Vélikovic, Galilée, 2002
  - Les Icônes païennes. Variations sur Ernest Pignon-Ernest, Galilée, 2003
  - Archéologie du présent. Manifeste pour une esthétique cynique, Adam Biro/Grasset, 2003
  - Épiphanies de la séparation. La Peinture de Gilles Aillaud, Galilée, 2004
  - Oxymoriques. Les Photographies de Bettina Rheims, Jannink, 2005
  - Fixer des vertiges : Les Photographies de Willy Ronis, Galilée, 2007
  - Le Chiffre de la peinture. L’Œuvre de Valerio Adami, Galilée, 2008
  - La Vitesse des simulacres. Les Sculptures de Pollès, Galilée, 2008
  - L'Apiculteur et les Indiens. La Peinture de Gérard Garouste, Galilée, 2009
  - Transe est connaissance. Un chamane nommé Combas, Flammarion, 2014
  - La danse des simulacres, Robert Laffon, 2019
- Political views
  - Politique du rebelle. Traité de résistance et d’insoumission, Grasset, 1997
  - La Pensée de midi. Archéologie d’une gauche libertaire, Galilée, 2007
  - Le Postanarchisme expliqué à ma grand-mère. Le Principe de Gulliver, Galilée, 2012
  - Le Miroir aux alouettes. Principes d'athéisme social, Plon, 2016
  - Décoloniser les provinces. Contribution aux présidentielles, L'Observatoire, 2017
  - La Cour des Miracles. Carnets de campagne, L'Observatoire, 2017
  - Zéro de conduite. Carnet d'après-campagne, L'Observatoire, 2018
  - Théorie de la dictature, Robert Laffon, 2019
  - Vies parallèles : De Gaulle - Mitterrand, Robert Laffon, 2020
- Hedonist diaries
  - Le Désir d’être un volcan, Grasset, 1996
  - Les Vertus de la foudre, Grasset, 1998
  - L’Archipel des comètes, Grasset, 2001
  - La Lueur des orages désirés, Grasset, 2007
  - Le Magnétisme des solstices, Flammarion, 2013
  - Le Temps de l'étoile polaire, Robert Laffont, 2019
- The fierce philosophy
  - Exercices anarchistes, Galilée, 2004
  - Traces de feux furieux, Galilée, 2006
  - Philosopher comme un chien, Galilée, 2010
- Travelogue
  - À côté du désir d’éternité. Fragments d’Égypte, Mollat, 1998
  - Esthétique du pôle Nord. Stèles hyperboréennes, Grasset, 2002
  - Théorie du voyage. Poétique de la géographie, LGF, 2007
  - Les Bûchers de Bénarès. Cosmos, Éros et Thanatos, Galilée, 2008
  - Nager avec les piranhas. Carnet guyanais, Gallimard, 2017
  - Le Désir ultramarin. Les Marquises après les Marquises, Gallimard, 2017
- Tetralogy of elements
  - Le Recours aux forêts. La Tentation de Démocrite, Galilée, 2009
  - La Sagesse des abeilles. Première leçon de Démocrite, Galilée, 2012
  - La Constellation de la baleine. Le Songe de Démocrite, Galilée, 2013
  - La Cavalière de Pégase. Dernière leçon de Démocrite, Galilée, 2019
- Poetry
  - Un requiem athée, Galilée, 2013
  - Avant le silence. Haïkus d’une année, Galilée, 2014
  - Les Petits serpents. Avant le silence, II, Galilée, 2015
  - L'Éclipse de l'éclipse. Avant le silence, III, Galilée, 2016

== See also ==
- Nietzsche, se créer liberté, comic book based on Onfray's L'Innocence du devenir
