= Paul René Gauguin =

Paul René Gauguin (27 February 1911 – 14 February 1976) was a French painter, graphical artist, sculptor, book illustrator and scenographer. He was born in Copenhagen, and was a son of Pola Gauguin, and grandson of Paul Gauguin. He is particularly known for his coloured woodcuts. Among his book illustrations are books by Inger Hagerup, and he made stage design for various theatres.

== Career ==
Born on 27 February 1911 in Copenhagen, Paul was an innovator in a typical form of Norwegian art that later got its name as the school of Norwegian color woodcuts. In 1924, he migrated to Provence, later to Rouen, where in 1930, he appeared for the entrance exam for the Norwegian Lycée Pierre Corneille.

Paul first learned his wood-cuts from 1930 to 1935, while on fishing trips to Mallorca and Ibiza. He made his debut in wood-cut art at the Autumn Exhibition 1936. In 1938, he worked as a journalist for Dagbladet while in Spain and completed his "Barcelona" while still working there. In the post World War II period in 1949, his work, The Mask, made a mark as a protest against NATO. Following more exhibitions, he did the illustration for Inger Hagerup's Strange in 1950. After his death in 1976, his first solo exhibition was hosted by his third wife, Martha Poulsen, in 1981, when 107 objets d'art were displayed at the National Museum. In his career span, from 1939 to 1945, he created theatrical motifs and decorations for Young Trøndelag Theater and in 1951, for National Theater. Apart from dramatizing the National theater, his decoration works along with his co-artist, Knut Rumohr, include: the Olympic Building, Hotel Viking, and the coastal steamer, MS Nordstjernen

In 1955 in Greece, Gauguin worked with enamel, iron sculptures and scrap iron. His works were inspired by Pablo Picasso, Max Ernst, Vincent van Gogh and Georges Braque. Grandson of the renowned French Impressionist, Paul Gauguin, he had a good command of English, French, Russian, Italian and Catalan.
