= Vocable (lexicography) =

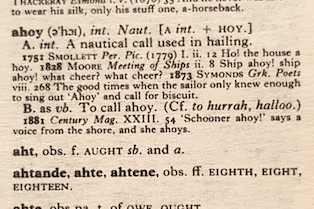
Here "ahoy", "aht", etc. are vocables

In lexicography, a vocable (from Latin: vocabulum) is the word or phrase which is explained by a dictionary entry and serves as its title. Often several related lexical units are grouped under the same vocable.

== See also ==
- Gloss (annotation)
