= Le Crépuscule d'une idole =

2010 book by Michel Onfray

- Author: Michel Onfray
- Language: French
- Subject: Sigmund Freud
- Publisher: Éditions Grasset
- Publication date: 21 April 2010
- Publication place: France
- Pages: 624
- ISBN: 978-2-246-76931-6

Le Crépuscule d'une idole : L'Affabulation freudienne (lit. 'The Twilight of an Idol: The Freudian Confabulation') is a 2010 book by the French writer Michel Onfray.

== Summary ==
Starting with an anecdote about how he encountered the works of Sigmund Freud at university, where he was studied seriously, Michel Onfray goes on to criticise Freud and his psychoanalysis for relying on fabrications, plagiarism and the legend Freud created about himself. Onfray criticises academia for treating Freud's theories as credible, and for producing what essentially are hagiographies about Freud.

== Publication ==
Éditions Grasset published the book on 21 April 2010. It was presented as a "psycho-biography".

== Reception ==
The book created a public dispute in France, where public figures indebted to Freudianism condemned Onfray. Franz-Olivier Giesbert wrote in Le Point: "Rarely has one seen such a deluge of bitterness against an author, called all manners of names, with a fury worthy of the glory days of Stalinism."

Le Crépuscule d'une idole was one of four finalists for the 2010 Prix Renaudot for non-fiction. By 2015, it had sold 150,000 copies.

== Apostille au Crépuscule ==
Onfray published a shorter sequel later in 2010, Apostille au Crépuscule : Pour une psychanalyse non freudienne (lit. 'Postscript to the Twilight: Toward a Non-Freudian Psychoanalysis'). In this book, he addresses the criticism he received and develops his view of psychoanalysis, which he supports but only in a non-Freudian variety, arguing that Freud plagiarised elements of a serious science and turned it into pseudoscience.

== See also ==
- Decline and Fall of the Freudian Empire
