= A Hedonist Manifesto =

2006 book by Michel Onfray

- Author: Michel Onfray
- Original title: La puissance d'exister
- Translator: Joseph McClellan
- Language: French
- Publisher: Éditions Grasset
- Publication date: 4 October 2006
- Publication place: France
- English publication date: November 2015
- Pages: 240
- ISBN: 9782246716914

A Hedonist Manifesto: The Power to Exist (French: La puissance d'exister : Manifeste hédoniste) is a 2006 book by the French writer Michel Onfray. It lays out a personal philosophy which Onfray defines as hedonist, and covers areas such as historiography, ethics, aesthetics, eroticism and politics. The perspective is materialist, affirms physical pleasure and stresses the need to impose obligations on oneself. The book is based on three lectures Onfray held at the Bibliothèque nationale de France in 2005.

The English translation by Joseph McClellan was published in 2015. Publishers Weekly wrote that the book's "dense philosophical writing" may frustrate some readers. The critic wrote that some of Onfray's descriptions of modern life "seem far removed from American norms", but that the book contains "interesting foundations for ethics, aesthetics, erotics, and politics arising from outside the main Western tradition".
