= Pola Gauguin =

Danish-Norwegian painter, art critic and biographer

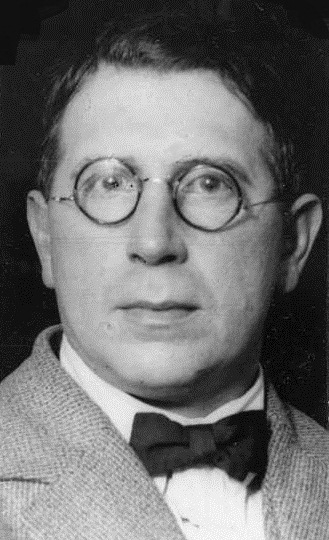
Pola Gauguin

Pola Gauguin (6 December 1883 – 2 July 1961) was a Danish-Norwegian painter, art critic and biographer.

== Biography ==
Paul Rollon Gauguin was born in Paris, France. He was the youngest of five children born to the famed French artist Paul Gauguin and his Danish wife Mette Sophie Gad (1850-1920). He was the brother of Émile Gauguin (1874–1955), Aline Gauguin (1877–1897), Clovis Gauguin (1879–1900), and Jean René Gauguin (1881–1961). In 1884, when he was one year old, his family moved to Denmark. The following year, his father returned to Paris. He grew up in Copenhagen where he was raised by his mother Mette and maternal grandparents. He had little interaction with his father and no direct contact after 1890.

He entered the Royal Danish Academy of Fine Arts (Kunstakademiets Arkitektskole) in 1905 and from 1906 to 1909 was assistant to the architects Hermann Baagøe Storck and Anton Rosen. He attended the art exhibitions at Kunstnernes Efteraarsudstilling in Copenhagen and in 1913 at Société des Artistes Indépendants in Paris. He debuted as an artist at Blomqvist Kunsthandel and Kunstnerforbundet in Oslo in 1913 and at the Oslo Autumn Exhibition in 1914. He started his own artist school in Oslo which he ran until 1924. During the 1920s, Gauguin lived through an artistic crisis. The crisis was followed by work as an author and critic for Dagbladet, Tidens Tegn, Verdens Gang and Ekstrabladet.

Pola Gauguin is represented in the National Gallery of Norway with five paintings including Fra Homansbyen from 1913 and Mordet from 1916 together with woodcuts and lithographs. He is also represented in the National Gallery of Denmark in Copenhagen, Nordenfjeldske Kunstindustrimuseum in Trondheim and Stenersen Museum in Oslo. Among his books are biographies of Henrik Lund, Christian Krohg, Edvard Munch and Ludvig Karsten.

== Personal life ==
He married Ingrid Blehr (1881-1959) in 1910 and was the father of Paul René Gauguin (1911-1976). Gauguin spent 19 days at Grini concentration camp in 1941. In 1949, he returned to Copenhagen where he died in 1961.

== Selected works ==
- Paul Gauguin – 1920
- Henrik Lund – 1931
- Christian Krohg – 1932
- Edvard Munch – 1933
- My Father Paul Gauguin – 1937
- Ludvig Karsten – 1949
- Norwegian Painters from J C Dahl to Edvard Munch – 1950
- Mark F. Severin – 1952
