= Aurélien Bellanger =

French writer and actor (born 1980)

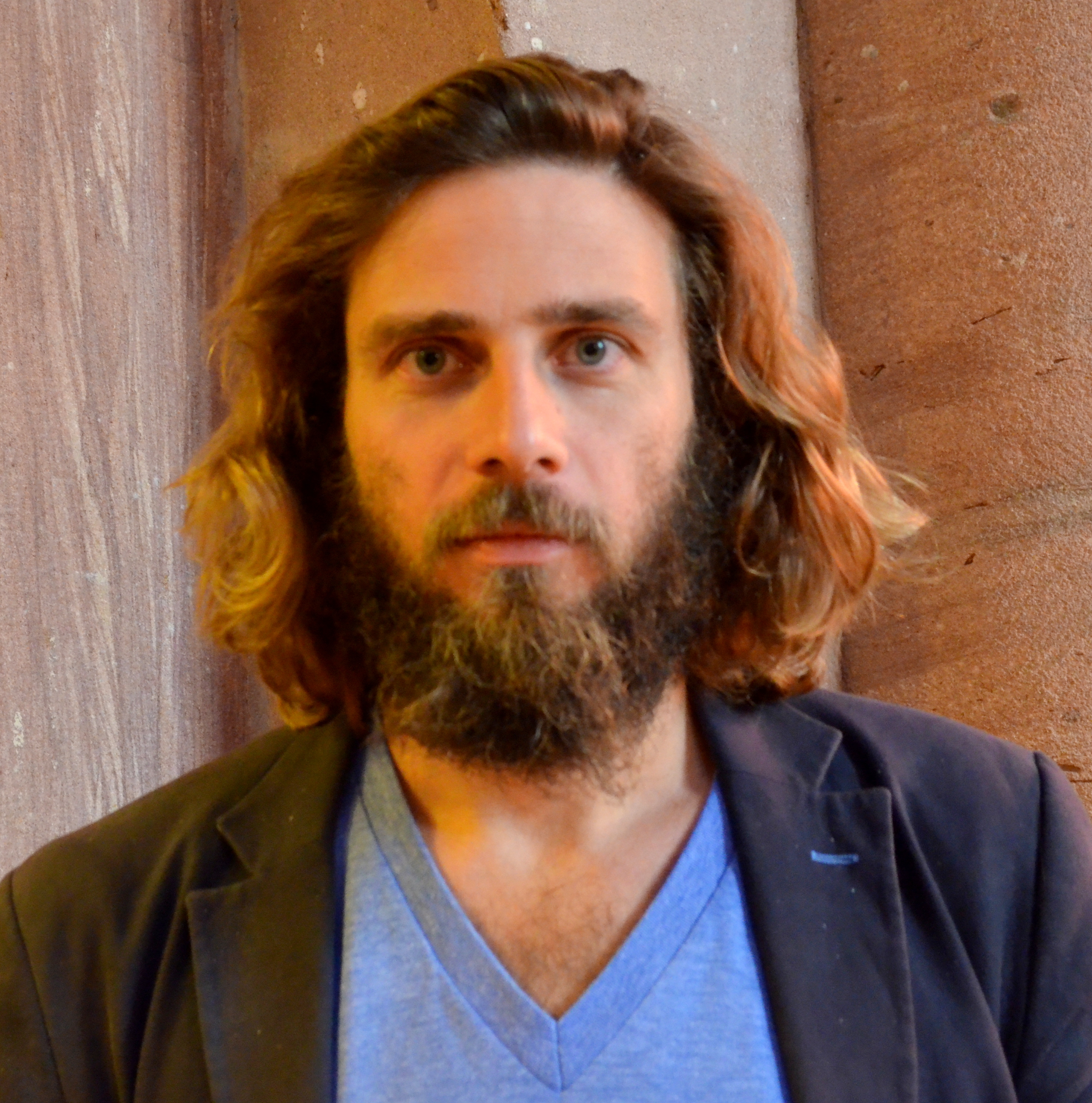
Bellanger in 2014

Aurélien Bellanger (born 20 April 1980 in Laval, Mayenne) is a French writer and actor. He debuted in 2010 with a monograph about Michel Houellebecq and has since published novels on a regular basis. His second novel, L'Aménagement du territoire, received the 2014 Prix de Flore. Due to his occupation with technology and modern life, his novels have been compared to the works of Houellebecq and Honoré de Balzac. In La Croix, Sabine Audrerie notes "If we had to look for a link, we could retain the desire to be part of the Balzacie heritage." Less laudatory, Jérôme Dupuis of L'Express described him as "a Houellebecq without humour, without sex, without aphorism, without melancholy".

== Literary works ==
- Houellebecq écrivain romantique (2010), éditions Léo Scheer, monograph
- La Théorie de l'information (2012), éditions Gallimard, novel
- L'Aménagement du territoire (2014), éditions Gallimard, novel
- Le Grand Paris (2017), éditions Gallimard, novel
- Le Continent de la douceur (2019), éditions Gallimard, novel
- Téléréalité (2021), éditions Gallimard, novel
- Le vingtième siècle (2023), éditions Gallimard, novel
- Le musée de la jeunesse (2024), Stock
- Les derniers jours du Parti socialiste (2024), Éditions du Seuil, novel
- Grottes, baleine, révolution (2025), Éditions du Seuil

== Filmography ==
- Vilaine Fille, mauvais garçon (2011)
- Agit pop (2011)
- Age of Panic (La Bataille de Solférino) (2013)
