= Michel Houellebecq bibliography =

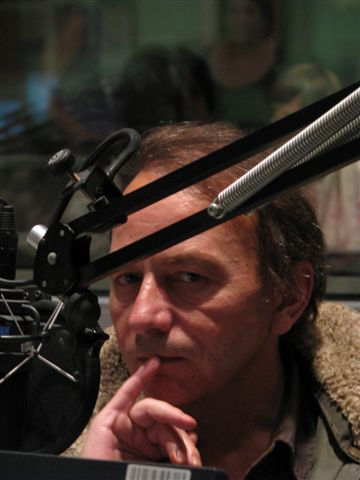
Houellebecq in 2008

Michel Houellebecq (born 26 February 1956 or 1958) is a French writer and occasional actor, film director and singer.

== Novels ==
- Extension du domaine de la lutte (1994, Maurice Nadeau, trans. as Whatever by Paul Hammond, 1998)
- Les Particules élémentaires (1998, Flammarion, trans. as Atomised by Frank Wynne, 2000; published in the US as The Elementary Particles)
- Lanzarote (2000, trans. by Frank Wynne, 2002) (short novel)
- Plateforme (2001, Flammarion, trans. as Platform by Frank Wynne, 2002)
- La Possibilité d'une île (2005, Fayard, trans. as The Possibility of an Island by Gavin Bowd, 2006)
- La Carte et le Territoire (2010, Flammarion, trans. as The Map and the Territory by Gavin Bowd, 2012)
- Soumission (2015, Flammarion, trans. as Submission by Lorin Stein, 2015)
- Sérotonine (2019, Flammarion, trans. as Serotonin by Shaun Whiteside, 2019)
- Anéantir (2022, Flammarion, trans. as Annihilation by Shaun Whiteside, 2024)

== Poetry ==
- La Poursuite du bonheur, poèmes (1992, La Différence)
- Le Sens du combat, poèmes (1996, Flammarion)
- Renaissance, poèmes (1999, Flammarion)
- Configuration du dernier rivage, poèmes (2013, Flammarion)
- Non réconcilié: Anthologie personnelle, 1991–2013 (2014, Gallimard, trans. as Unreconciled: Poems 1991–2013 by Gavin Bowd, 2017)
- Combat toujours perdant (2026, Flammarion)

== Essays and other books ==
- H. P. Lovecraft: Contre le monde, contre la vie (1991, trans. as H. P. Lovecraft: Against the World, Against Life by Dorna Khazeni, introduction by Stephen King, 2005), an analysis of the life and work of H. P. Lovecraft.
- Rester vivant, méthode (1991, La Différence).
- Interventions (1998, Flammarion), collection of articles (including the lengthy mini-essay "Approches du désarroi"), interviews, letters and poetry. Expanded in 2009 as Interventions 2 and in 2020 as Interventions 2020.
- Ennemis publics (2008, Flammarion, transl. as Public Enemies: Dueling Writers Take on Each Other and the World, 2011), an exchange by e-mail between Michel Houellebecq and Bernard-Henri Lévy
- En présence de Schopenhauer, L'Herne (2017)
- Interventions 2020 (2020, Flammarion)
- Quelques mois dans ma vie (2023, Flammarion)

== Articles ==
- "Préface : Renoncer à l'intelligence" (1991) in Rémy de Gourmont, L'Odeur des jacinthes, Paris: Orphée / La Différence, pp. 7–20.
- "Le haut langage" (1995) in La Quinzaine littéraire, 670; Paris; pp. 21–22.
- "Un monde sans direction" (1996) in La Quinzaine littéraire, 700; Paris; pp. 8–9.
- "Approches du désarroi" (1997), in Dix, Les Inrockuptibles / Grasset (lengthy article or short essay which provides a thorough account of Houellebecq's theoretical views, developed in his contemporary novels Whatever and Atomised, including an unflinching charge against consumerism and advertising).
- "La question pédophile : Réponse" (1997) in L'Infini 59, Paris: Gallimard, pp. 96–98.
- "Préface : L'Humanité, second stade" (1998) in Valérie Solanas, SCUM Manifesto, Paris: Éditions Mille et une nuits, pp. 63–69.
- "Je crois peu en la liberté – Entretien" (1998) in Revue Perpendiculaire 11, Paris: Flammarion, p. 4–23.
- "Michel Houellebecq répond à Perpendiculaire" (1998) in Le Monde 18 September 1998.
- "La privatisation du monde" (2000) in L'Atelier du roman 23, Paris, pp. 129–34.
- "Neil Young" (2000) in Michka Assayas (ed.) Dictionnaire du rock, Paris: Robert Laffont (second part of the article, co-signed with Yves Bigot who wrote the more chronological first part).
- "Wilde Flucht" (2000) in Tageszeitung Berlin, 30 October 2000.
- "Préface" in Tomi Ungerer, Erotoscope (2001), Éditions Taschen, Paris.
- "Description d'une lassitude" (2002) in Houelle 10, Paris.
- "L'homme de gauche est mal parti" (2003) in Le Figaro 6/1/2003, p. 1, 13.
- "Préface : Préliminaires au positivisme" (2003) in Bourdeau, Braunstein & Petit (eds.): Auguste Comte aujourd'hui, Paris: Éditions Kimé, pp. 7–12. (translated as "Religion for Immortals," The Utopian, December, 2010).
- "Mourir" (2005) on homepage.mac.com/michelhouellebecq (autobiographical account, written following the publication of Houellebecq non autorisé, which deeply disturbed the author).
- "En présence de Schopenhauer" (2010) on Mediapart.fr, feb. 2010 (5 parts).
- "Donald Trump Is a Good President" (2019) in Harper's Magazine, January 2019.
- "Une civilisation qui légalise l’euthanasie perd tout droit au respect" (2021) in Le Figaro, 10 April 2021.

== Audio albums ==
- Le Sens du combat (1996) Paris: Les Poétiques de France Culture.
- Présence humaine (2000) Paris: Tricatel.
- Établissement d'un ciel d'alternance (2007) Paris: Grrr.

== Published in collaboration ==
- Judith Barry, Pascal Convert & Rainer Pfnür (eds.) (1993) Genius Loci, Paris: La Différence.
- Le livre du plaisir (1999), Catherine Breillat (ed.) Paris: Éditions 1 (anthology of literary texts on the themes of sex, eroticism, pleasure — or lack thereof — selected and commented by Catherine Breillat).
- Objet Perdu: fictions – Idées – Images (1995), Paris: Lachenal et Ritter & Parc Éditions.
- Claus Hegemann (ed.) (2000) Kapitalismus und Depression II: Glück ohne Ende, Berlin: Alexander Verlag.
- Dominique Noguez (ed.) (2002) Balade en Seine-et-Marne: Sur les pas des écrivains, Paris: Éditions Alexandrines.
- Thomas Ruff & Michel Houellebecq (2002) Nudes, München: Walther König.
- Sarah Wiame (drawings) & Michel Houellebecq (poems) (1993) La Peau, Paris: Sarah Wiame.
- Sarah Wiame (drawings) & Michel Houellebecq (poems) (1995) La Ville, Paris: Sarah Wiame.

== Works on Houellebecq ==
- Manuel Chemineau, "Michel Houellebecq. Vive le trash!", in Wiener Zeitung, Extra (2 April 1999).
- Thomas Steinfeld, Das Phänomen Houellebecq (2001).
- Dominique Noguez, Houellebecq, en fait (2003).
- Murielle Lucie Clément, Houellebecq, Sperme et sang (2003).
- Olivier Bardolle, La Littérature à vif (Le cas Houellebecq) (2004).
- Sabine van Wesemael (ed.), Michel Houellebecq (2004).
- Fernando Arrabal, Houellebecq (2005).
- Éric Naulleau, Au secours, Houellebecq revient ! (2005).
- Jean-François Patricola, Michel Houellebecq ou la provocation permanente (2005).
- Denis Demonpion, Houellebecq non autorisé, enquête sur un phénomène (2005).
- Sabine van Wesemael, Michel Houellebecq, le plaisir du texte (2005).
- Gavin Bowd (ed.), Le Monde de Houellebecq (2006).
- Murielle Lucie Clément, Michel Houellebecq revisité (2007).
- Murielle Lucie Clément and Sabine van Wesemael (eds.), Michel Houellebecq sous la loupe (2007).
- Lucie Ceccaldi, L'innocente (2008).
- Marc-Edouard Nabe, Le Vingt-Septième Livre (2009).
- Aurélien Bellanger, Houellebecq écrivain romantique (2010).
- James Grieve, "A Mongrel in the Path: Prose and Poetry by Michel Houellebecq", in Art & Authenticity (2010).
- Juremir Machado da Silva, "Um Escritor no Fim do Mundo: viagem com Michel Houellebecq à Patagônia" (2011).
- Ben Jeffery, Anti-Matter: Michel Houellebecq and Depressive Realism (2011).
- Bernard Maris, Houellebecq économiste (2014).
- Samuel Estier, À propos du "style" de Houellebecq. Retour sur une controverse (1998-2010), Lausanne, Archipel (2015).
- Nicolas Mavrakis, Houellebecq. Una experiencia sensible (2016).
- Louis Betty, Without God: Michel Houellebecq and Materialist Horror (2016).
