= Interventions (Houellebecq book) =

Essay collection by the French writer Michel Houellebecq

- Interventions (1998); Interventions 2 (2009); Interventions 2020 (2020)
- Author: Michel Houellebecq
- Translator: Andrew Brown
- Country: France
- Language: French
- Genre: Essays
- Publisher: Éditions Flammarion

Interventions is a collection of texts by the French writer Michel Houellebecq, including essays, interviews and polemical articles. The book exists in three versions, published in 1998, 2009 and 2020. The later versions are mainly expansions with new material, although a few texts only appear the earlier editions. The third version, Interventions 2020, was published in English in 2022.

== Background ==
The French writer Michel Houellebecq came to public attention in the 1990s. His first novel Whatever was published in 1994, and although it initially received little attention, it gradually became renowned over the next few years. When his second novel Atomised was published in 1998, it became a major literary event in France, was printed in 177,000 copies and sold to many countries. It launched Houellebecq to prominence and made him a subject of much analysis in the media, where he was described as controversial, as a new trend and as an example of nihilist literature.

== Publication ==
The first version of Houellebecq's text collection Interventions was published by Éditions Flammarion in 1998. A new version, expanded with new content and a few texts from the first version removed, appeared through Flammarion in 2009 as Interventions 2. In 2020, Flammarion published a further expanded version as Interventions 2020. This version was published in a pocket edition by J'ai lu in 2022 under the title Interventions. Interventions 2020 is the only version that exists in English translation. It was translated by Andrew Brown and published by Polity in 2022.

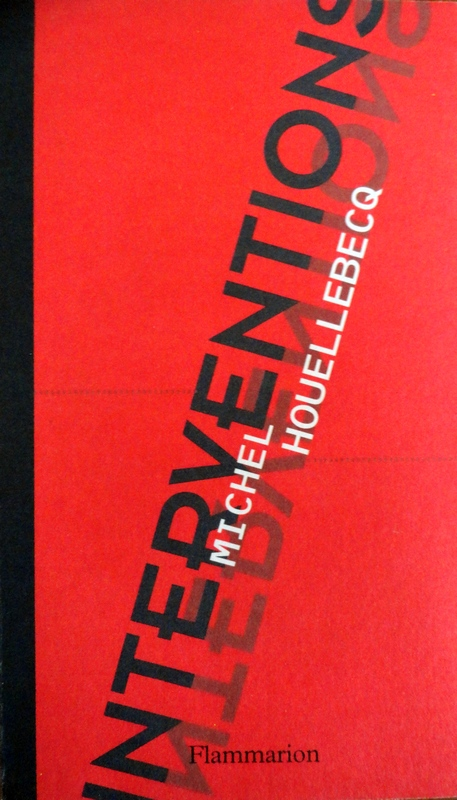
Interventions (1998)

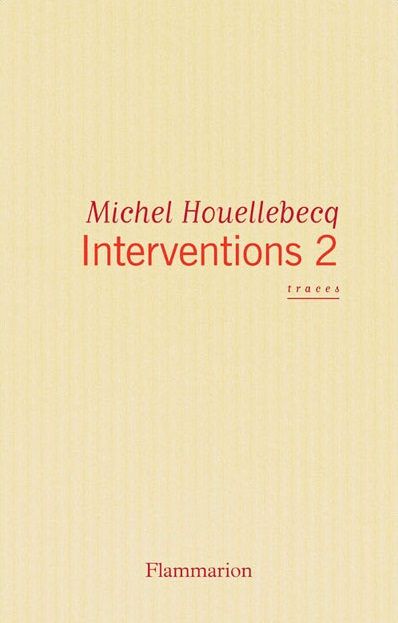
Interventions 2 (2009)

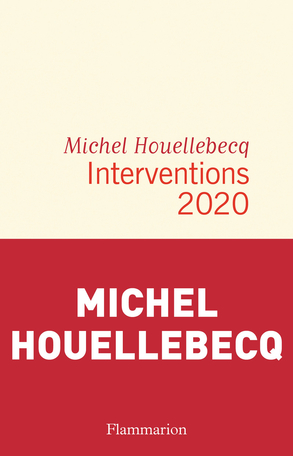
Interventions 2020 (2020)

== Contents ==
The English titles and publication info for the texts in Interventions 2020 are from the "Sources" section of that book. Additional info is from Interventions and Interventions 2.

English title	Original title	First published		I	I2	I2020	Notes
English title	Original title	Date	Publication	I	I2	I2020	Notes
"Jacques Prévert is a jerk"	"Jacques Prévert est un con"	July 1992	Les Lettres Françaises #22	Yes	Yes	Yes	
"The Mirage by Jean-Claude Guiguet"	"Le Mirage de Jean-Claude Guiduet"	December 1992	Les Lettres Françaises #27	Yes	Yes	Yes	
"Approaches to distress"	"Approches du désarroi"	1992	Genius loci	Yes	Yes	Yes	Also in Rester vivant et autres textes, 1999
"Staring into the distance: in praise of silent cinema"	"Le Regard perdu, éloge du cinéma muet"	May 1993	Les Lettres Françaises #32	Yes	Yes	Yes	
"Interview with Jean-Yves Jounnais and Christophe Duchâtelet"	"Entretien avec Jean-Yves Jounnais et Christophe Duchâtelet"	February 1995	art press	Yes	Yes	Yes	
"Art as peeling"	"L'art comme épluchage"	1995	Les Inrockuptibles #5	Yes	Yes	Yes	
"Creative absurdity"	"L'absurdité créatrice"	1995	Les Inrockuptibles #13	Yes	Yes	Yes	
lit. 'Interview with Valère Staraselski'	"Entretien avec Valère Staraselski"	5 July 1996	L'Humanité	Yes	No	No	
"The party"	"La fête"	1996	20 Ans	No	Yes	Yes	Also in Rester vivant et autres textes, 1999
"Time out"	"Temps morts"	February–March 1997	Les Inrockuptibles #90–97	Yes	Yes	Yes	Also in Rester vivant et autres textes, 1999
lit. 'Interview with Sabine Audrerie'	"Entretien avec Sabine Audrerie"	April 1997	Encore #5	Yes	No	No	
"Opera Bianca"	"Opera Bianca"	1998	Interventions	Yes	Yes	Yes	Installation at the Centre d'Art Contemporain Georges-Pompidou, 1997
"Letter to Lakis Proguidis"	"Lettre à Lakis Proguidis"	1997	L'Atelier du roman #10	Yes	Yes	Yes	
"The question of paedophilia"	"La question pédophile"	1997	L'Infini #59	No	Yes	Yes	
"Humanity, the second stage"	"L'Humanité, second stade"	1998	SCUM Manifesto	No	Yes	Yes	Afterword to Mille et Une Nuits's edition of the manifesto by Valerie Solanas
"Empty heavens"	"Cieux vides"	1999	Rester vivant et autres textes	No	Yes	Yes	
"I have a dream"	"Ich habe einen Traum"	2 November 2000	Die Zeit	No	Yes	Yes	Interview with Wolfgang Farkas; in French translation as "J'ai un rêve"
"Neil Young"	"Neil Young"	2000	Dictionnaire du rock	No	Yes	Yes	
"Interview with Christian Authier"	"Entretien avec Christian Authier"	January 2002	L'Opinion indépendante	No	Yes	Yes	
"Technical consolation"	"Consolation technique"	2002	Lanzarote et autres textes	No	Yes	Yes	
"Sky, earth, sun"	"Ciel, terre, soleil."	2002	Contes de campagne	No	Yes	Yes	Also in Lanzarote et autres textes, 2002
"Leaving the twentieth century"	"Sortir du XXe siècle"	April 2002	Nouvelle Revue Française #561	No	Yes	Yes	Also in Lanzarote et autres textes, 2002
"Philippe Muray in 2002"	"Philippe Muray en 2002"	6 January 2003	Le Figaro	No	Yes	Yes	Originally titled "L'homme de gauche est mal parti"
"Towards a semi-rehabilitation of the hick"	"Vers une semi-réhabilitation du beauf"	2003	online	No	Yes	Yes	
"Conservatism, a source of progress"	"Le conservatisme, source de progrès "	8 November 2003	Le Figaro	No	No	Yes	Also in Houellebecq, Cahiers de l'Herne, 2017
"Prolegomena to positivism"	"Préliminaires au positivisme"	2003	Auguste Comte aujourdhui	No	Yes	Yes	Preface to a book by Michel Bourdeau
"I'm normal. A normal writer"	"Je suis normal. Écrivain normal."	2004?	Unknown magazine	No	Yes	Yes	Houellebecq says it first appeared in a magazine but does not remember which one. Also in Des nouvelles du prix de Flore, 2004
lit. 'Interview with Gilles Martin-Chauffier and Jérôme Béglé'	"Entretien avec Gilles Martin-Chauffier et Jérôme Béglé"	October 2006	Paris Match #3000	No	Yes	No	
"Soil cutting"	"Coupes de sol"	September 2008	Artforum	No	Yes	Yes	
"I have read my whole life long"	"J'ai lu toute ma vie"	2008	?	No	Yes	Yes	Written for the 50th anniversary of the publishing house J'ai lu
"The lost text"	"Le texte perdu"	2012	L'Imaginaire touristique	No	No	Yes	Preface to a book by Rachid Amirou
"Interview with Frédéric Beigbeder"	"Entretien avec Frédéric Beigbeder"	April 2014	Lui #7	No	No	Yes	
"A remedy for the exhaustion of being"	"Un remède à l'épuisement d'être"	2014	Musée national	No	No	Yes	Preface to a book by Marc Lathuillière
"Interview with Marin De Viry and Valérie Toranian"	"Entretien avec Marin de Viry et Valérie Toranian"	July 2015	Revue des deux Mondes	No	No	Yes	
"Interview with Agathe Novak-Lechevalier"	"Entretien avec Agathe Novak-Lechevalier"	2020	Interventions 2020	No	No	Yes	The interview took place during La Noche de los Libros in Málaga, April 2017
"Emmanuel Carrière and the problem of goodness"	"Emmanuel Carrère et le problème du bien"	2018	Emmanuel Carrère. Faire effraction dans le réel	No	No	Yes	
"Donald Trump is a good president"	"Donald Trump is a good president"	January 2019	Harper's Magazine	No	No	Yes	The French title is "Donald Trump est un bon président".
"Conversation with Geoffrey Lejeune"	"Conversation avec Geoffroy Lejeune"	May 2019	First Things	No	No	Yes	Also in Revue des deux Mondes, October 2019
"A bit worse. A response to a few friends"	"En un peu pire."	4 May 2020	France Inter	No	No	Yes	Letter read on radio by Augustin Trapenard
"The Vincent Lambert affait should not have taken place"	"L'affaire Vincent Lambert n'aurait pas dû avoir lieu"	2020	Vincent Lambert, une mort exemplaire?	No	No	Yes	Preface to a book by Emmanuel Hirsch

== Reception ==
Interventions received little attention when the first version was published in 1998. It appeared soon after Houellebecq's novels Whatever and Atomised had become subjects of international discussions and it was marketed as a key to the "real Houellebecq". Alexander Müller of literaturkritik.de said it will disappoint people who approach it for that reason, comparing it negatively to Houellebecq's novels in its analyses of social processes. He praised its "aggressive style" and analytical abilities in some passages, but said it contains platitudes and "has little to offer other than the anti-Americanism that is widespread in France". Carole Sweeney says its texts have similar themes as Whatever and Houellebecq's earlier prose work Rester vivant (1991). These 1990s works address mechanistic and individualistic worldviews as existential threats and analyze how the logic of markets affects sexuality.

At the publication of Interventions 2, Sébastien Lapaque of Le Figaro described Houellebecq as one of few French writers who defy the zeitgeist by being "bad boys", together with Maurice G. Dantec, Richard Millet, Marc-Édouard Nabe, Christian Laborde, Benoît Duteurtre and Gérard Oberlé. He said Interventions 2 elucidates both Houellebecq's novels and his "art of war". In L'Obs, Maud Granger Remy wrote that the title Interventions 2 is misleading, because it is not a sequel but an expansion of the existing Interventions, and the 17 added texts are also republications. She said the collection is incoherent and some texts suffer from being taken out of context, such as the afterword to the SCUM Manifesto, which she called beautiful but without relevance when it is not read together with the manifesto itself. Granger Remy criticized the publisher for recycling and relabelling material in a way that is dishonest and unworthy of Houellebecq, whose other books she described as "truly coherent, aesthetically and ideologically".

When Interventions 2020 was published, David Caviglioli and Grégoire Leménager of L'Obs used it to analyze Houellebecq's changing affinites over three decades. They group the texts into four periods: an early phase with "the communist press", the 1990s with Les Inrockuptibles, from the early 2000s with Le Figaro, and finally with Valeurs actuelles, which they call "Lepenist and Identitarian". David Sexton of The Spectator says the book's promotion of love and kindness makes Houellebecq appear "far from the depressive slut with an odd knack for prophecy that he is still eagerly reported to be in the British press".
