= To Stay Alive: A Method =

- Directed by: Erik Lieshout; Arno Hagers; Reinier van Brummelen
- Screenplay by: Erik Lieshout
- Based on: "To Stay Alive" by Michel Houellebecq
- Produced by: Marc Thelosen
- Starring: Michel Houellebecq; Iggy Pop
- Cinematography: Reinier van Brummelen
- Edited by: Reinier van Brummelen
- Production company: Serious Film
- Release dates: 19 November 2016 (IDFA); 2 February 2017
- Running time: 70 minutes
- Country: Netherlands
- Languages: French; English

To Stay Alive: A Method is a 2016 Dutch documentary film directed by Erik Lieshout, Arno Hagers and Reinier van Brummelen. It is based on Michel Houellebecq's 1991 essay "To Stay Alive", about struggling artists, the role of the poet, and mental health problems. It features marginal artists as well as Houellebecq and the rock singer Iggy Pop, who reads from the original essay.

== Production ==
The director Erik Lieshout had first met Houellebecq when he interviewed him for Dutch television during the promotion of the novel The Possibility of an Island, and ended up directing Last Words, a behind-the-scenes documentary for Houellebecq's own film adaptation of the novel. Lieshout then asked Iggy Pop if he could possibly provide a track for the film, with little hope; but to his surprise, the singer replied very enthusiastically: in the meantime he had actually read the book (as well as a selection of Houellebecq's poetry), and loved it, finding many parallels with his own life and state of mind, to the point that it inspired him a whole album, named Préliminaires, quieter than his usual output, partly sung in French, with several tracks directly related to the novel. The two artists first met in 2009, during the promotion for the album, and shared their admiration for each other's works. Indeed, Houellebecq has been a devoted fan of The Stooges since he was a teenager, contrasting with his reputation for apathy and languid intellectualism.

To Stay Alive: A Method was produced by Serious Film with co-production support from AT-prod and VPRO. It was completed in April 2016.

== Release ==
The film was screened at the International Documentary Film Festival Amsterdam on 19 November 2016. It was released in Dutch cinemas on 2 February 2017.
