= Ute Cohen =

German writer, journalist

Ute Cohen (born 1966) is a German writer, journalist and moderator based in Berlin. She has published novels, essays and non-fiction works that explore themes such as social relations, violence and aspects of contemporary culture.

She moderates the literary and cultural event series Cohen’s Club in Berlin and contributes interviews and essays to various German newspapers and magazines.

== Life ==
Cohen studied linguistics and history and received a scholarship from the Studienstiftung des deutschen Volkes, Germany’s national scholarship foundation for gifted students. She later completed a doctorate in linguistics.

Before establishing herself as an author, Cohen worked in Düsseldorf, Frankfurt and Paris for international management consultancies and a United Nations organisation and also advised company founders as a communications consultant. She subsequently moved to Berlin, where she has been active as a freelance writer, journalist and moderator; her interviews and essays appear in German newspapers and magazines.

Cohen has conducted long-form interviews with cultural figures, including French actor Jean-Louis Trintignant. She also took part in a published conversation with French novelist Michel Houellebecq in 2023, together with historian David Engels, as documented by the German newspaper Die Tagespost.

== Works ==
=== Novels ===
- Satans Spielfeld. Septime Verlag, 2017.
- Poor Dogs. Septime Verlag, 2020.
- Falscher Garten. Septime Verlag, 2022.

=== Conversation/Interview Record ===
- Chaos? Hinhören, Singen. Conversation with Ingrid Caven. Kampa Verlag, 2021.

=== Non-fiction / Essays ===
- Der juristische "Bedeutungswandel": linguistische Überlegungen zu Stasis und Dynamik im Rechtssystem. Dissertation (Erlangen), 1994.
- Der Geschmack der Freiheit. Reclam, Stuttgart 2024.
- Glamour. Über das Wagnis, sich kunstvoll zu inszenieren. Zu Klampen Verlag, 2025.

== Reception ==
Cohen’s novels have received coverage in German literary and cultural media. In its review of Falscher Garten, Deutschlandfunk described the work as a grotesquely exaggerated Berlin story with black humour. The journal literaturkritik.de similarly emphasised the novel’s macabre tone and use of grotesque elements.

CulturMag reviewed both Satans Spielfeld and Poor Dogs, noting their engagement with themes of social hierarchy, economic pressure and interpersonal violence.

Her non-fiction book Der Geschmack der Freiheit has been discussed in several cultural outlets. FrontRowSociety and Leseschatz described it as examining culinary traditions in a broader cultural context, and taz featured the book in a public talk on German food culture.
