= Plateforme (comic book) =

2014 comic book by Alain Dual

- Page count: 144 pages
- Publisher: Les contrebandiers

Creative team
- Writer: Alain Dual, after Michel Houellebecq
- Artist: Alain Dual

Original publication
- Date of publication: 23 October 2014
- Language: French
- ISBN: 9782915438628

Plateforme (lit. 'Platform') is a 2014 French comic book by Alain Dual. It is about a misanthropic Frenchman who meets a cynical French woman in Thailand, and the two begin to develop package holidays aimed at European sex tourists in Southeast Asia. The comic is based on the 2001 novel Platform by Michel Houellebecq.

Dual contacted Houellebecq in 2011 to get permission for the adaptation. They corresponded throughout the creation process and Houellebecq provided input and requests about the dialogues. Houellebecq saw the adaptation as an opportunity to improve his story, which in the comic focuses more on the relationship between the two main characters.

The comic book was published by Les contrebandiers on 23 October 2014. BoDoï wrote that the simple drawing style is "sometimes a bit cheap" and that the adaptation does not add any value to the original book, but the "resigned lucidity" of the text is enough to make it fascinating.
