= Configuration du dernier rivage =

2013 poetry collection by Michel Houellebecq

- Author: Michel Houellebecq
- Language: French
- Publisher: Flammarion
- Publication date: 17 April 2013
- Publication place: France
- Pages: 104
- ISBN: 9782081303164

Configuration du dernier rivage (lit. 'Configuration of the Last Shore') is a poetry collection by the French writer Michel Houellebecq, published by Flammarion on 17 April 2013.

== Contents ==
The book consists of 100 poems written over a period spanning from the early 1990s to shortly before the publication. Some poems are rhymed and some are not and the tone is often dark, ironic and provocative. Death recurs as a prominent theme. The book is divided into five sections: l'étendue grise, week-end prolongé en zone 6, mémoires d'une bite, les parages du vide and plateau.

== Reception ==
Houellebecq had started out as a poet, but Configuration du dernier rivage was his first poetry collection since Renaissance from 1999. In France, the book was treated as Houellebecq's return to public life, as he was living in Ireland and had avoided media appearances since receiving the Prix Goncourt in 2010 for The Map and the Territory. Unusually for a poetry collection, Configuration du dernier rivage received coverage on the front pages of French daily and weekly newspapers. RFI wrote that "the 'Houellebecq' craze" had "returned with increasing force to the unwillingness of the author himself".
