= Mathis Nitschke =

German composer and sound designer

Mathis Nitschke (born 4 June 1973 in Munich) is a German composer, sound designer, director and producer. His work spans opera and music theatre, theatre and film music, spatial and interactive audio, and sound-based installations. He has collaborated internationally with artists and directors including Michel Houellebecq, Claus Guth, Robert Icke, Taryn Simon, Simon Rattle, Jonas Kaufmann and Raphaël Pichon.

== Life and work ==
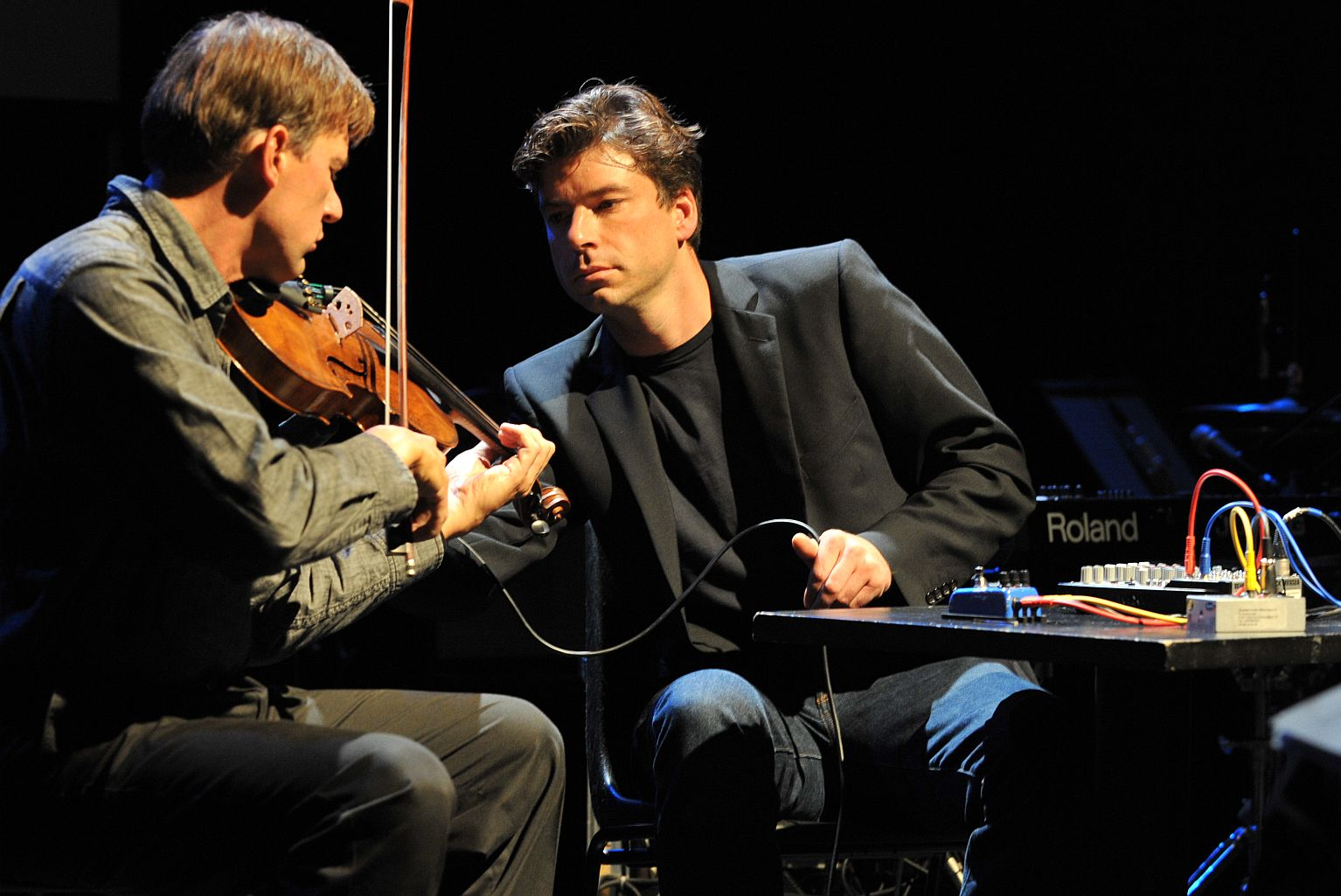
Mathis Nitschke

Nitschke studied classical guitar and fine arts before completing his studies in composition at the Royal Conservatory of The Hague with Gilius van Bergeijk, Richard Ayres and Clarence Barlow. From 2005 to 2007 he completed a postgraduate M.A. programme in Media and Communication at the European Graduate School in Saas-Fee, where he attended seminars with artists and thinkers including Heiner Goebbels, Jean-Luc Nancy, Michel Houellebecq, DJ Spooky, Mike Figgis, Peter Greenaway and The Brothers Quay.

Alongside his own music-theatre works, Nitschke has worked since the 1990s as a composer and sound designer for theatre, film and contemporary music. In 2008 he composed and produced the orchestral score for Houellebecq's directorial debut La Possibilité d’une Île, based on the writer's novel The Possibility of an Island.

In 2012 Nitschke collaborated with writer Jonas Lüscher and director Urs Schönebaum on the opera JETZT, premiered at the Opéra Orchestre national Montpellier. The work was nominated for "Premiere of the Year" in the 2013 critics' poll of the German opera magazine Opernwelt.

In 2014 the Opéra National de Montpellier premiered his HAPPY HAPPY, an "operatic song-cycle with party" for soprano, chorus, chamber orchestra and electronics.

From the mid-2010s, Nitschke developed a series of music-theatre works outside conventional theatre spaces. VIOLA (2015) was staged in a pharmacy in Munich.

VERGEHEN (2016) was a location-aware sound walk along the River Isar using smartphones, GPS and binaural audio. VERGEHEN was nominated in the Stage/Space/Costume category of the 2017 critics' poll of Die Deutsche Bühne.

In 2017 he created MAYA, a mixed-reality techno opera in the ruins of a former heating plant in Munich-Aubing. The work combined live performance and music with augmented reality, digital art and a mobile interface through which the audience explored an additional digital layer of the physical environment.

With Lure (2020), Nitschke explored musical and theatrical forms of interaction with learning computer systems.

Nitschke's work with spatial and interactive audio later included projects with the Munich Philharmonic. Inside MPhil (2019) allowed listeners equipped with a GPS-enabled smartphone and headphones to move virtually between the instruments of the orchestra.

In 2022 this approach was developed further in The Planets, an interactive 3D-audio soundwalk based on the Munich Philharmonic's recording of Gustav Holst's orchestral suite. The app uses immersive binaural technology and allows listeners to move freely through the spatialised orchestral sound field. Nitschke was responsible for overall artistic direction, dramaturgy, sound design and mixing.

== International collaborations ==
Nitschke has worked extensively as a composer and sound designer in international opera, theatre and visual-art productions.

In 2023 he created original music and sound compositions for Doppelgänger, Claus Guth's theatrical staging of Franz Schubert's Schwanengesang with tenor Jonas Kaufmann and pianist Helmut Deutsch at the Park Avenue Armory in New York.

The production received extensive international press coverage, including reviews in The New York Times and the Financial Times.

In 2024 he designed the sound for Taryn Simon's installation Start Again the Lament at Cisternerne in Copenhagen.

The same year he was sound designer for Samson, a new work by director Claus Guth and conductor Raphaël Pichon, freely based on the lost opera project by Jean-Philippe Rameau and Voltaire, which received its world premiere at the Festival d'Aix-en-Provence.

In 2025 Nitschke was responsible for sound in Robert Icke's production of Mozart's Don Giovanni at the Festival d'Aix-en-Provence, conducted by Sir Simon Rattle.

In 2026 Kassandra, based on Christa Wolf's novella and directed by Nadja Loschky, premiered at Theater Bielefeld. Nitschke composed the music together with Stefan Behrisch.

== Research and reception ==
Nitschke's work at the intersection of music theatre, public space and digital media has also been discussed in theatre scholarship. In 2018 theatre scholar David Roesner published "Found and framed. A conversation with composer and designer Mathis Nitschke" in the journal Theatre and Performance Design. The article focuses on VIOLA, VERGEHEN and MAYA and discusses questions of opera, space and design.

== Selected works ==
=== Opera, music theatre and installations ===
- 2012: JETZT, opera, Opéra National de Montpellier
- 2014: HAPPY HAPPY, operatic song cycle, Opéra National de Montpellier
- 2015: VIOLA, music theatre in public space, Munich
- 2016: VERGEHEN, location-aware sound walk, Munich
- 2017: MAYA, mixed-reality techno opera, Munich
- 2019: Small Places, sound installation, Seoul
- 2020: Lure, music-theatre project involving learning systems
- 2022: The Planets, interactive 3D-audio soundwalk with the Munich Philharmonic
- 2023: Doppelgänger, original music and sound composition, Park Avenue Armory, New York
- 2024: Start Again the Lament, sound design for Taryn Simon, Cisternerne, Copenhagen
- 2024: Samson, sound design, Festival d'Aix-en-Provence
- 2025: Don Giovanni, sound, Festival d'Aix-en-Provence
- 2026: Kassandra, music with Stefan Behrisch, Theater Bielefeld

=== Film music ===
- 2008: The Possibility of an Island, directed by Michel Houellebecq
- 2017: Über Leben in Demmin, documentary film by Martin Farkas
- 2020: Der Sog des Krieges – Eine Familiengeschichte, documentary film by Christoph Boekel

=== Theatre and opera sound design ===
- 2009: Kleiner Mann, was nun?, directed by Luk Perceval, Münchner Kammerspiele
- 2023: Doppelgänger, directed by Claus Guth, Park Avenue Armory, New York
- 2024: Start Again the Lament, Taryn Simon, Cisternerne, Copenhagen
- 2024: Samson, directed by Claus Guth, Festival d'Aix-en-Provence
- 2025: Don Giovanni, directed by Robert Icke, Festival d'Aix-en-Provence

== Teaching ==
Nitschke has taught seminars and workshops at the Musikhochschule Trossingen, the Hochschule der populären Künste Berlin and the University of Applied Sciences St. Pölten.
