= Serotonin (novel) =

Novel by Michel Houellebecq

- First edition cover
- Author: Michel Houellebecq
- Original title: Sérotonine
- Translator: Shaun Whiteside
- Language: French
- Publisher: Flammarion (France)
- Publication date: 4 January 2019
- Publication place: France
- English publication date: 26 September 2019 (UK)
- Media type: Print
- Pages: 352
- ISBN: 978-2-08-147175-7
- Dewey Decimal: 843/.914
- LC Class: PQ2668.O77 S48 2019

Serotonin (French: Sérotonine) is a novel by French writer Michel Houellebecq, published in January 2019.

== Plot ==
The narrator, Florent-Claude Labrouste, is a depressed agricultural scientist who lives in a Parisian apartment block, the Tour Totem. He commutes to Normandy to help promote French cheese. Sympathetic to the plight of local farmers, he is powerless to help them retain their traditional methods:

In short, what is taking place with French agriculture is a vast redundancy plan, but one that is secret and invisible, where people disappear one by one, on their plots of land, without ever being noticed.

After watching a television documentary about people who choose to disappear from their life without telling anyone, Labrouste abruptly leaves his girlfriend, a young Japanese woman who is highly sexual but devoid of affection, quits his job under a false pretense and flees to a smoker's room in a chain hotel in another part of Paris.

A sympathetic doctor prescribes him a large dose of a miracle antidepressant, Captorix, to remedy his low levels of serotonin. Although the drug dulls his sex drive, Labrouste returns to Normandy with the intention to relive happier days he spent there with his past lovers. He soon visits an old college friend, Aymeric d'Harcourt-Olonde, an aristocratic farmer whose recent financial failures have left him divorced and suicidal. Taking up residence in a holiday cabin owned by Aymeric, Labrouste becomes a skilled marksman training with Aymeric's expansive firearm collection. He confronts a pedophile living in another one of the holiday cabins, but passively lets him flee. Shortly after, Aymeric and other struggling farmers fulfill their plan to stop the importation of cheap foreign milk by establishing an armed blockade. Upon the arrival of riot police, Aymeric commits suicide, sparking a firefight that leaves ten men dead.

Later on, Labrouste, having kept one of Aymeric's target-shooting rifles for himself, begins stalking one of his past girlfriends, Camille, who has since had a son by another man and is raising him alone. Establishing a sniper's nest in an empty hotel overlooking her isolated house, he comes close to killing her son in order to eventually return to being "the man" in her life. However, he finds himself unable to kill the child. Finally, Labrouste moves back to Paris, contemplating committing suicide by jumping out of a window.

== Themes ==
The novel depicts French farmers struggling to survive in the face of globalisation, agribusiness and European Union policies. It foresaw many concerns of the yellow vests movement which began protesting in France in late 2018. Written before protesters began blockading roads in real life, Serotonin soon joined previous Houellebecq novels Platform and Submission in being termed eerily prophetic by critics.

As with many of Houllebecq's works, the protagonist is an alienated, middle-aged man. Serotonin features its author's trademark black humour and depictions of loveless sex, and also touches on paedophilia (when the narrator spies on a suspicious German tourist) and bestiality (when he finds pornographic videos of his girlfriend on her computer). The overall mood is one of spiritual malaise and social fracture during the decline of the West.

== Publication ==
The initial print run in France was 320,000 copies. German, Italian and Spanish editions were published the same month. An English translation by Shaun Whiteside was published in the United Kingdom by William Heinemann on 26 September 2019. Whiteside's translation was published in the United States by Farrar, Straus and Giroux on 19 November 2019.

== Reception ==
In France, Serotonin was the best-selling fiction book in the week it was released. Within three days of its publication, it had sold 90,000 copies. The release was considered a national event, coming as it did the same month Houellebecq was awarded the Legion of Honour.

In the English-speaking press, the novel generally received mixed to negative reviews. Johanna Thomas-Corr, writing for The Observer, labeled it "predictable" and particularly criticized its sexually explicit content, while Dwight Garner, in a review for The New York Times, called it "slack" compared with Houellebecq's earlier work.

In response to the narrator of Serotonin calling Niort "one of the ugliest towns I've ever seen", the town's mayor said that he would send some locally grown angelica to Houellebecq's publisher to cheer up the notoriously gloomy author.
