= Quelques mois dans ma vie =

2023 book by Michel Houellebecq

Quelques mois dans ma vie : Octobre 2022 – Mars 2023
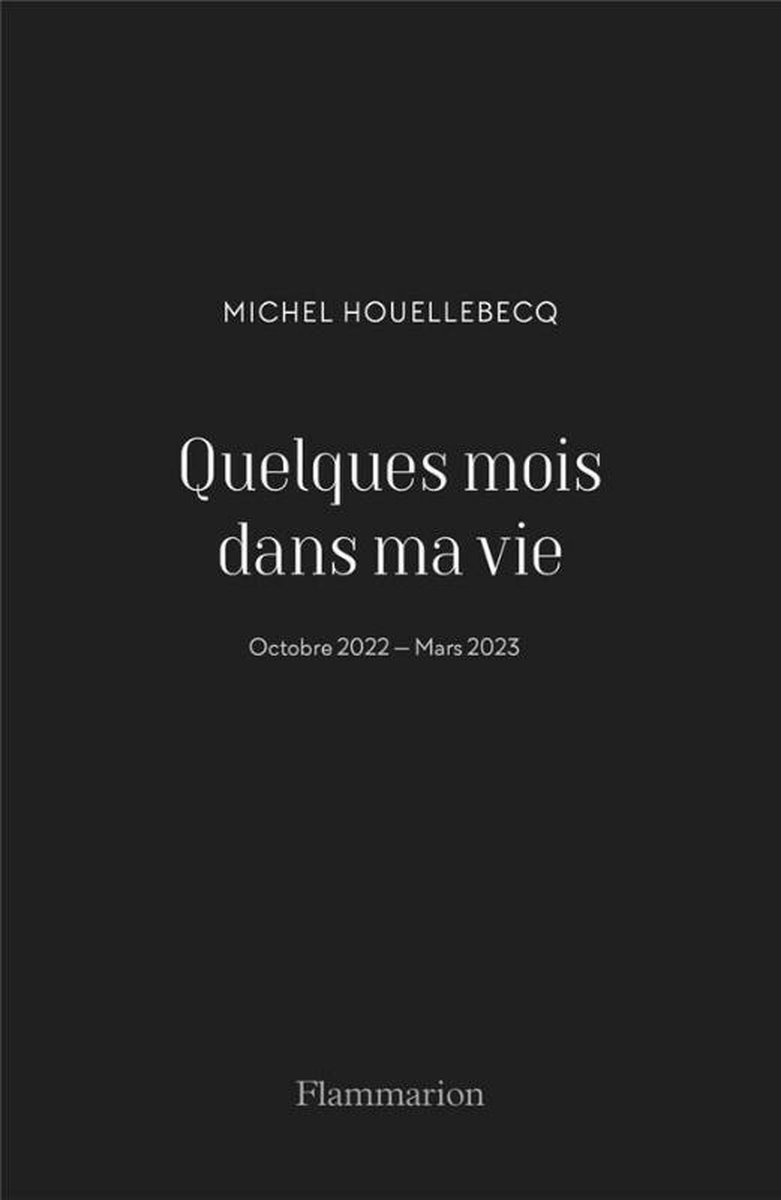
- Author: Michel Houellebecq
- Language: French
- Publisher: Editions Flammarion
- Publication date: 24 May 2023
- Publication place: France
- Pages: 112
- ISBN: 978-2-08-043580-4

Quelques mois dans ma vie : Octobre 2022 – Mars 2023 (lit. 'Some months in my life: October 2022 – Mars 2023') is a 2023 book by the French writer Michel Houellebecq.

== Summary ==
Quelques mois dans ma vie is an account of six months in Michel Houellebecq's life. Two events stood out during this period and received media attention.

Houellebecq gave an interview in Michel Onfray's magazine Front populaire, published in November 2022. In the interview, Houellebecq associated Muslim immigrant populations with crime against native Frenchmen and predicted a future of violent attacks against Muslims in France, described as an "inverse Bataclan" (French: Bataclan à l'envers). The Grand Mosque of Paris's rector Chems-Eddine Hafiz filed a complaint to the police where he accused Houellebecq of breaking the country's law against incitement to racial hatred. In Quelques mois dans ma vie, Houellebecq says he regrets these statements and apologises to all Muslims.

Later, Houellebecq agreed to appear in a pornographic film by a Dutch director. When the trailer for the film was released and showed Houellebecq shirtless with a young woman, he took legal action and tried to stop the film, as he said he was promised his participation would be kept secret. Houellebecq says the affair made his life a hell and describes the experience as if he was treated "like the subject of a wildlife documentary".

== Reception ==
Raphaëlle Leyris of Le Monde called the book tedious and said that Houellebecq "demonstrates a remarkably finicky conception of consent". Esther Serrajordia of La Croix was disappointed that the book does not address another controversy from the same period, when the French-Senegalese author El Hadji Diagola accused Houellebecq of having plagiarised his works in the novel Submission (2015). L'Express calls Quelques mois dans ma vie a "vibrant and frank story". Jacobin described the work as "one of Houellebecq’s most durable contributions, driven by a naive frankness and an earnest sense of tragedy absent from his later writings."
