= Loo Hui Phang =

French writer and film director (born 1974)

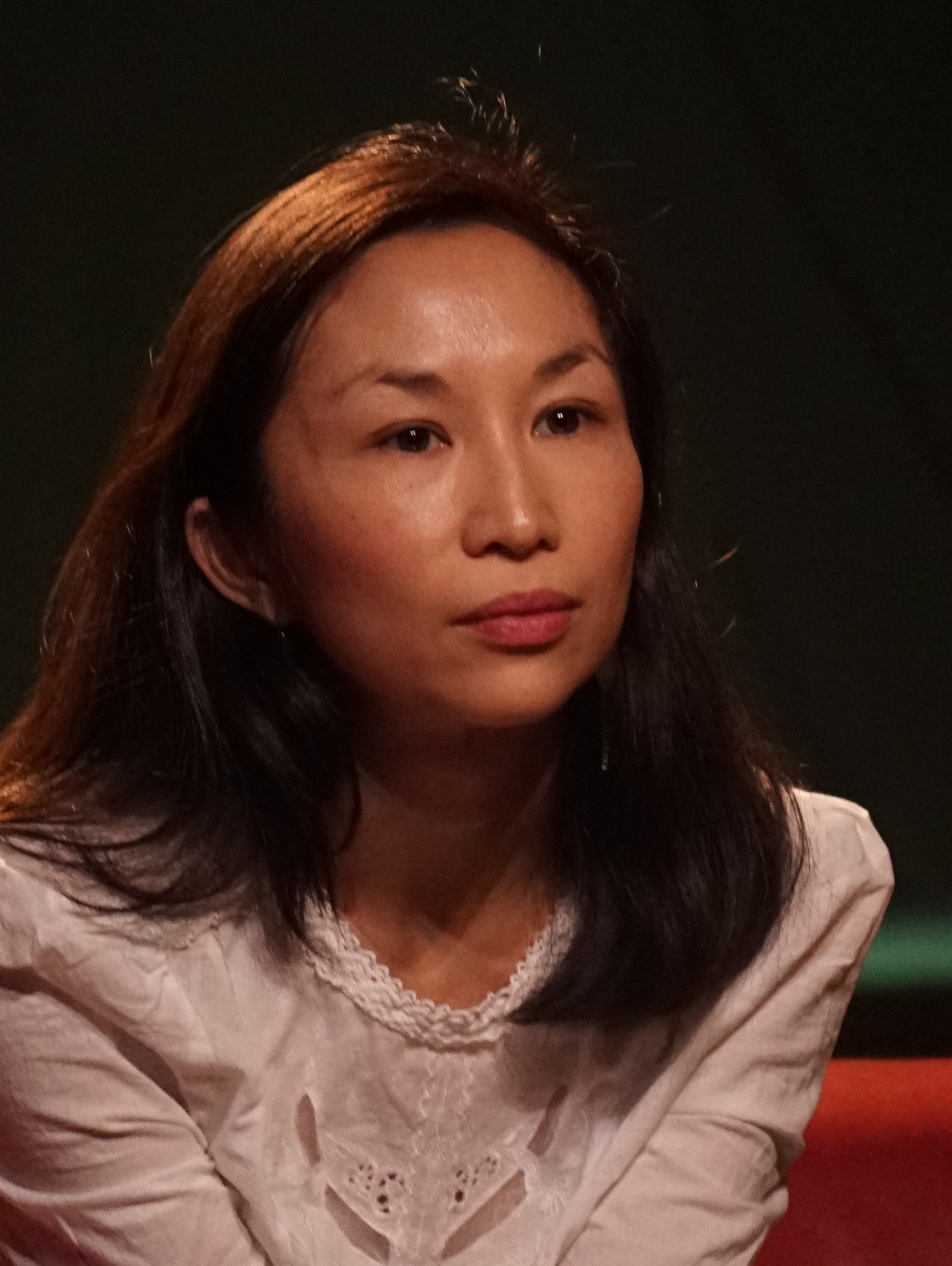
- Born: 12 November 1974 (age 51); Laos
- Known for: Comic book artist

Loo Hui Phang (born 12 November 1974) is a French writer and film director.

== Biography ==
The daughter of a Chinese father and Vietnamese mother, Hui Phang was born in Laos and grew up in Normandy. She studied modern literature and cinema. In 1997, she moved to Paris, where she became involved in independent cinema and graphic novels. Hui Phang has also written plays for children.

In 2014, she prepared an immersive installation based on George Orwell's Animal Farm for the Pulp Festival at the La Ferme du Buisson. The following year, at the same festival, she created an installation based on Edgar Allan Poe's The Fall of the House of Usher.

== Selected work ==
=== Picture books ===
- Délice de vaches (2000) with Jean-Pierre Duffour
- Merveilles de bricolage (2001) with Jean-Pierre Duffour
- Jouets plus ultra (2001) with Jean-Pierre Duffour
- Bienvenue au collège (2001) with Jean-Pierre Duffour
- Tout seuls (2003) with Jean-Pierre Duffour

=== Graphic novels ===
- La Minute de bonheur (1999)
- Panorama (2004)
- Prestige de l'uniforme (2005), received a prize at the Angoulême International Comics Festival
- L'odeur des garçons affamés (2016)
- Nuages et Pluie (2016)

== Films ==
- Monde extérieur (2004), in collaboration with Michel Houellebecq
- Panorama (2006), received the Prix Nouveau Regard at the Torino GLBT Film Festival
- Matty Groves (2013), music video for Moriarty
