= Marcel Zanini =

French jazz musician (1923–2023)

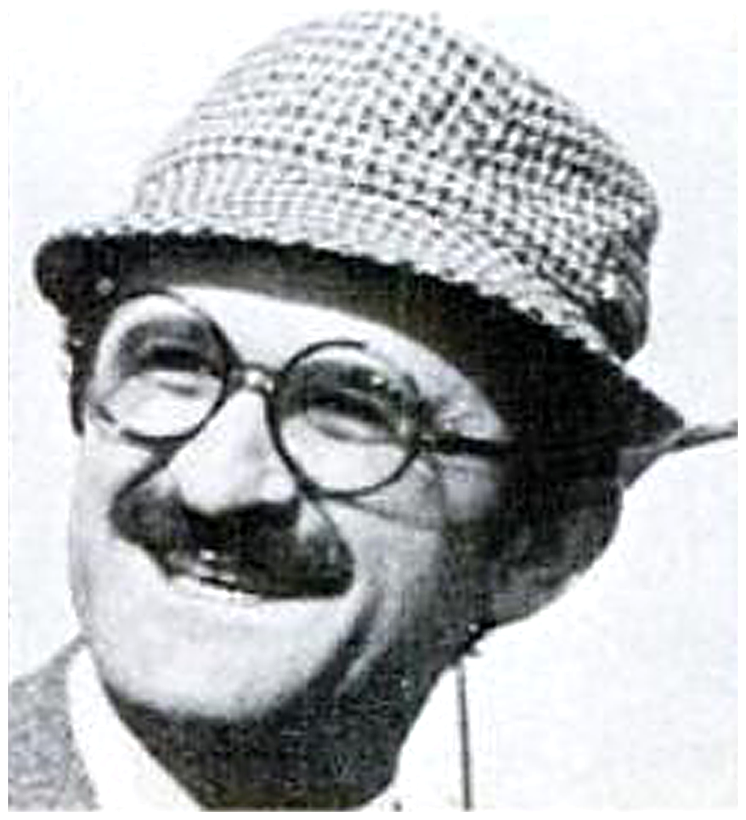
Portrait of Marcel Zanini

Marcel Zanini (real name Zannini; 9 September 1923 – 18 January 2023) was a Turkish-born French jazz musician.

Zanini was born on 9 September 1923 in Istanbul, Turkey. His family arrived in Marseille in 1930 and settled there. His father was Neapolitan and his mother was Greek. He began learning the clarinet in 1942 and joined the orchestra of Leo Missir in 1946. He founded his first band in the early 1950s. He left for the United States in 1954 and has lived in New York for four years. He was the correspondent for the French magazine Jazz Hot. He returned to Marseille in 1958 and set up a new formation.

Zanini went to Paris and in 1969 Leo Missir, then artistic director of the Barclay label, suggested he do a French adaptation of the Brazilian song by Wilson Simonal, "Nem vem que não tem" under the French name "Tu veux ou tu veux pas" (You want to or you don't). It was a huge success and Zanini became famous for his little mustache, bucket hat and glasses.

Zanini continued to play in jazz clubs and festivals in Paris with his sextet. He has played with many musicians, French and American, including Georges Arvanitas and Eddy Louiss.

Zanini was the father of the author Marc-Édouard Nabe who sometimes accompanied him on guitar. He lived in Yvelines. Zanini died on 18 January 2023, at the age of 99.
