= In the Presence of Schopenhauer =

2017 book by the French writer Michel Houellebecq

- Cover of the first edition
- Author: Michel Houellebecq
- Original title: En présence de Schopenhauer
- Translator: Andrew Brown
- Language: French
- Publisher: L'Herne
- Publication date: 11 January 2017
- Publication place: France
- English publication date: 22 May 2020
- Pages: 96
- ISBN: 978-2-85197-832-5

In the Presence of Schopenhauer (French: En présence de Schopenhauer) is a 2017 book by the French writer Michel Houellebecq. It is a personal reflection on the German philosopher Arthur Schopenhauer and the effect he has had on Houellebecq.

== Synopsis ==
Houellebecq recounts how he as a 25-year-old came across a copy of Schopenhauer's Aphorisms. Houellebecq became enthralled within minutes and hunted down the philosopher's major work, The World as Will and Representation. Although a "disappointed enthusiast" for the positivism of Auguste Comte, it is in Schopenhauer's philosophy he finds consolation.

== Reception ==
France Culture's Géraldine Mosna-Savoye wrote that "Houellebecq turns himself into a formidable commentator", and that it would be a mistake to try to read the book as "a clarification of [Houellebecq's] writings". The critic argued that the book should be read only as a confrontation with Schopenhauer's philosophy, and as such manages to make it "both present and current". Joseph Hanimann of the Süddeutsche Zeitung wrote that "Houellebecq's Schopenhauer commentaries offer an as thorough as original reading". Hanimann was particularly fascinated by Houellebecq's defense of eroticism as a viable part of art, which is in conflict with Schopenhauer's view, and wrote that "it's just a pity that he doesn't go further into such paradoxes".
