= Without God: Michel Houellebecq and Materialist Horror =

2016 book by Louis Betty

Without God
- First edition cover
- Author: Louis Betty
- Language: English
- Subject: Michel Houellebecq
- Publisher: Penn State University Press
- Publication date: 7 June 2016
- Publication place: United States
- Pages: 176
- ISBN: 978-0-271-07408-5

Without God: Michel Houellebecq and Materialist Horror is a 2016 book by the American writer Louis Betty. Literature and Theology recognized it as "the first book-length study of Michel Houellebecq's fiction to be produced by an American scholar".

== Summary ==
Without God: Michel Houellebecq and Materialist Horror is about how the works of the French writer Michel Houellebecq relate to religion, which Betty argues is a central concern in their examinations of progressive society and human intimacy. Betty argues that the major theme in Houellebecq's novels is not, like others have argued, the economic and sexual liberalism they portray, but the paradigm shift in metaphysics that preceded those phenomena. Betty characterises Houellebecq's works as horror fiction where the horror stems from the "tragedy of human life stripped of its metaphysical consolations".
