= Annihilation (Houellebecq novel) =

2022 novel by Michel Houellebecq

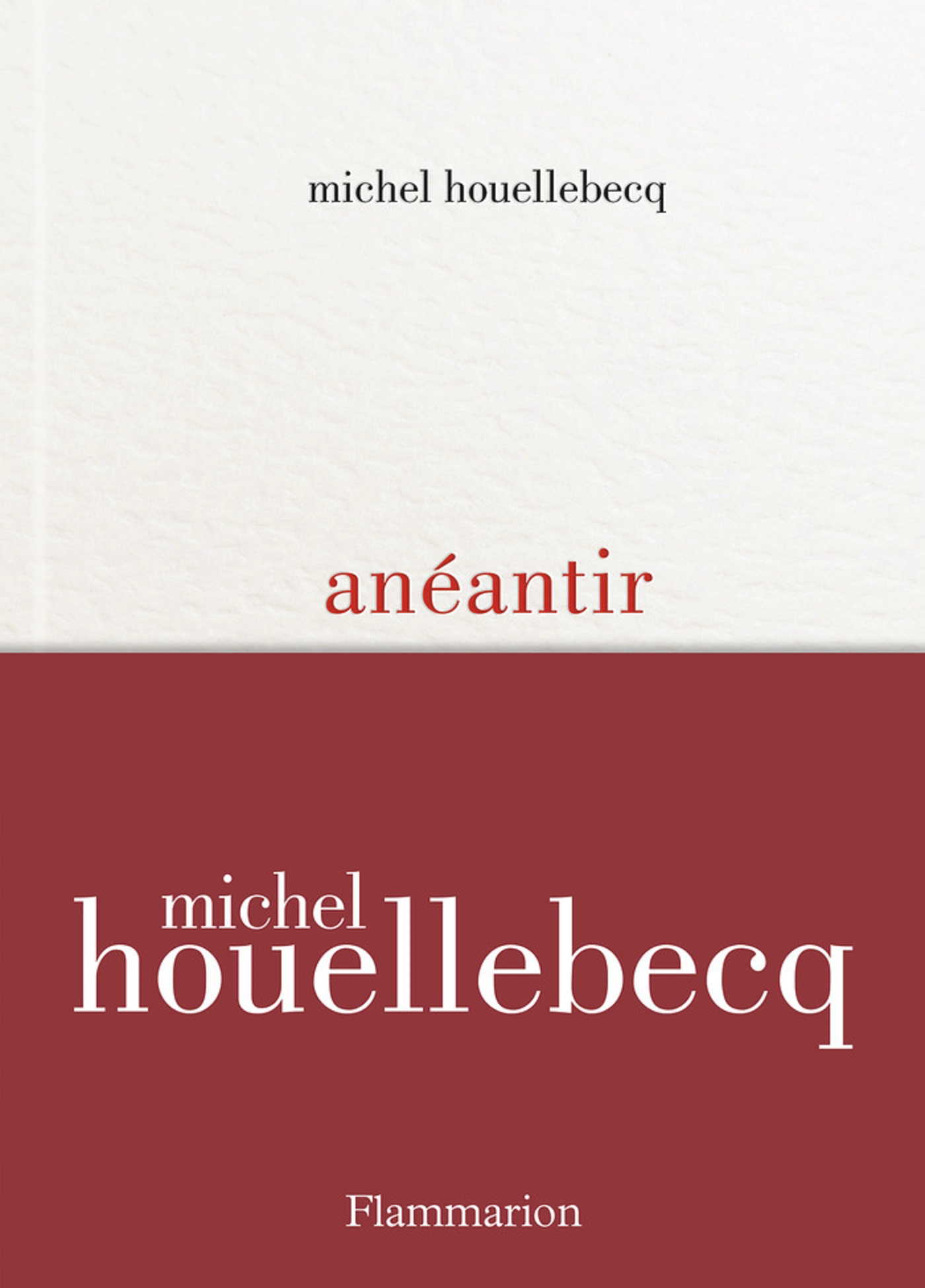
- First edition with red bandeau
- Author: Michel Houellebecq
- Original title: Anéantir
- Translator: Shaun Whiteside
- Language: French
- Genre: Novel
- Publisher: Flammarion
- Publication date: 7 January 2022
- Publication place: Paris, France
- English publication date: 19 September 2024 (UK); 8 October 2024 (US)
- Media type: Print (hardback)
- Pages: 736
- ISBN: 978-2-08-027153-2
- OCLC: 1291165914
- LC Class: PQ2668.O77 A83 2022

Annihilation (French: Anéantir, (Note: The novel's title is stylised in all lowercase, in accordance with the author's request.) pronounced [a.ne.ɑ̃.tiʁ], lit. 'to annihilate') is a novel by Michel Houellebecq, published on 7 January 2022 by Éditions Flammarion. An English translation by Shaun Whiteside was published in 2024.

== Plot ==
Paul Raison works for the French minister of finance, Bruno Juge. Under Bruno, the French economy has seen a renaissance, particularly in car manufacturing and labour relations. Paul is separated from his wife Prudence; they share an apartment but hardly see each other. Paul has frequent dreams.

Mysterious messages have been appearing on the internet, accompanied by high-quality computer-generated videos, one depicting the beheading of Bruno in a guillotine. Eventually a video showing the destruction of a cargo ship is published; this turns out to be real, threatening global trade.

Paul's father Édouard is a retired member of the General Directorate for Internal Security, who has been analysing the mysterious messages. He has a stroke, leaving him unable to speak, but he recovers the ability to communicate by blinking.

Édouard's family convene to look after him, including his partner Madeleine, and his children Paul, Cécile, and Aurélien. Cécile's husband Hervé is an unemployed notary; they are supporters of the National Front. Aurélien's wife Indy has had a child by another man's sperm, a black donor, even though Aurélien is not infertile. She is more interested in selling the sculptures of Édouard's deceased wife, Suzanne. Aurélien decides to seek a divorce. Paul begins to rebuild his relationship with Prudence.

The mysterious terrorists attack a sperm bank in Denmark. Bruno starts to prepare for the 2027 presidential election.

Édouard begins to be neglected by the hospital staff, and his family enlist the help of far-right activists to remove him from the hospital. Indy publishes an article about this, and Paul is forced to take unpaid leave due to his connection to Bruno. Aurélien commits suicide.

The terrorists attack a migrant ship crossing the Mediterranean, killing 500 people. As a result, Bruno's party wins the presidential election. The security services plot the coordinates of the three attacks on a pentagram, identifying two further attack locations. One had already been destroyed, a neurotechnology research centre in Ireland. The second, in Croatia, was the planned location of a tech conference.

Paul develops mouth cancer. He refuses an operation to cut out his tongue, but undergoes radiotherapy, chemotherapy, and immunotherapy.

== Analysis ==
The novel mixes espionage and politics, mystery and romanticism. Jean Birnbaum of Le Monde called it a "political thriller that veers into metaphysical meditation". It envisions the years of 2026 and 2027 where France is in a period of decline. However, France shows some signs of revival and is without labour strikes but "the gap between the ruling classes and the populace has reached unprecedented levels". The country nonetheless remains in a state of moral decay with high levels of unemployment and rural poverty. It begins during the 2027 French presidential election with the outgoing president, although not named, implied to be Emmanuel Macron. Right-wing figures Marine Le Pen and Éric Zemmour, however, appear by name.

The young outgoing president is completing his second term, having "given up the fantasies of a start-up nation which won his first election, but had objectively resulted only in the creation of a few precarious underpaid jobs". This parallels Macron's promise of a start-up nation, which critics have echoed similar evaluations of. The election candidates include, on the presidential majority side, the Minister of the Economy and a character who resembles media personality Cyril Hanouna. In the opposition, a young far-right candidate is close behind in the polls.

At over 700 pages, Annihilation is unusual for its slow pace and its tone, which is characterised more by compassion than irony. The stroke of their father presents an opportunity for siblings Cécile, Aurélien and Paul to repair their relationship. The narrative explores themes of faith and love. France Inter described the narrative as a "Houellebecq somewhere between nihilism and romanticism". On Europe 1 Dimitri Pavlenko said, "You might think this is a sinister and pessimistic Houellebecq. But no. Many of the characters are searching for goodness and the message of the book could be: "Love saves".

== Characters ==
- Paul Raison – an official of the Minister of the Economy and Finance; also an énarque
- Bruno Juge – the Minister of the Economy and Finance; Paul's employer
- Prudence – Paul's wife; an official of the Treasury Department
- Édouard Raison – Paul's father, former intelligence official
- Madeleine – partner of Édouard Raison
- Cécile Raison – Paul's sister; a fervent Catholic
- Hervé – husband of Cécile; unemployed notary
- Aurélien Raison – brother of Paul; art conservationist
- Indy – Aurélian's wife
- Godefroy – Indy's son
- Véronique – former wife of Paul Raison
- Martin-Renaud – high-ranking General Directorate for Internal Security (DGSI) officer
- Bastien Doutremont – a forty-something computer scientist working as a contractor for the DGSI
- Fred – a forty-something computer scientist working as a contractor for the DGSI

== Influences ==
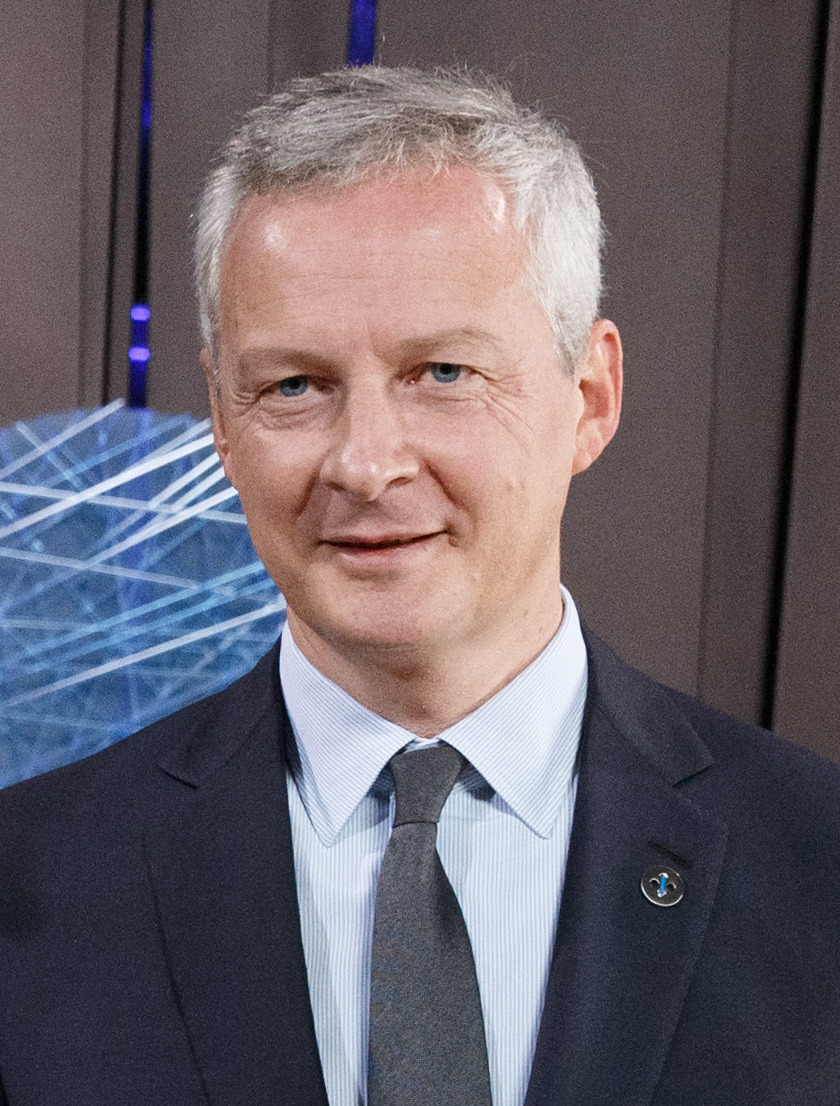
Bruno Le Maire

The character of Bruno Juge, Minister of the Economy and Finance, is likely a reference to Bruno Le Maire, who served as the Minister of the Economy and Finance at the time of the novel's publication. In October 2021, Bruno Le Maire, a personal friend of Houellebecq, revealed some elements of the novel's plot.

== Publication ==
The novel was published on 7 January 2022 by Éditions Flammarion. The first print run was 300,000 copies.

Less than three weeks before its publication, the first pages of the novel were illegally distributed on social media. On 21 December 2021, a complete digital copy was circulated, presumably made from a scan of the book since no digital version was released. Only print copies were sent to literary journalists, with a formal request from the publisher not to reveal any details of the novel's plot until 30 December 2021.

Shaun Whiteside's English translation was published in the UK on 19 September 2024 by Picador and in the US on 8 October 2024 by Farrar, Straus and Giroux.

== Reception ==
Reviews for Annihilation have been largely positive. Jean Birnbaum of Le Monde wrote, "The most poignant pages of his novel are those in which he manages to bring to life, amid solitude and dereliction, fleeting gestures that make you cry." Étienne Campion of Marianne called it a "profound novel about illness, suffering, agony, and death, which will surprise, even irritate, many readers". The daily newspapers Le Figaro and Libération, which are positioned on opposing sides of the political spectrum, were in agreement in praising the success of the novel's storyline. Likewise, a favourable reception was received from the magazine Elle and from regional daily newspapers such as Ouest-France and La Voix du Nord.

Mediapart panned the novel, writing, "All these nauseating words are distilled in small touches, as in the minor mode." Left-wing publications L'Obs, Les Inrockuptibles and L'Humanité also published unfavourable reviews of the novel, deviating from their usual acclaim of Houellebecq's work. L'Obs criticized the novel's length and described it as "a yawn".
