= Whatever (1999 film) =

- Directed by: Philippe Harel
- Screenplay by: Philippe Harel
- Based on: Whatever by Michel Houellebecq
- Produced by: Adeline Lecallier
- Starring: Philippe Harel; José Garcia
- Cinematography: Gilles Henry
- Edited by: Bénédicte Teiger
- Production companies: Lazennec Productions; StudioCanal
- Distributed by: Mars Distribution
- Release date: 13 October 1999
- Running time: 120 minutes
- Country: France
- Language: French
- Budget: $2.8 million
- Box office: $420,000

Whatever is a 1999 French drama film directed by Philippe Harel, starring Harel and José Garcia. The original French title is Extension du domaine de la lutte, which means "extension of the domain of struggle." It tells the story of a man whose misanthropy goes out of control due to a business trip together with a colleague. It is based on the novel Whatever by Michel Houellebecq.

The film was released on 13 October 1999 through Mars Distribution. It had 55,967 admissions in France.

== Cast ==
- Philippe Harel as Notre héros
- José Garcia as Raphael Tisserand
- Catherine Mouchet as La psy
- Cécile Reigher as Catherine Lechardey
- Marie-Charlotte Leclaire as H. La secrétaire de LA Brette
- Philippe Agael as Buvet
- Christophe Rossignon as Bernard
