= Jean Birnbaum =

French journalist

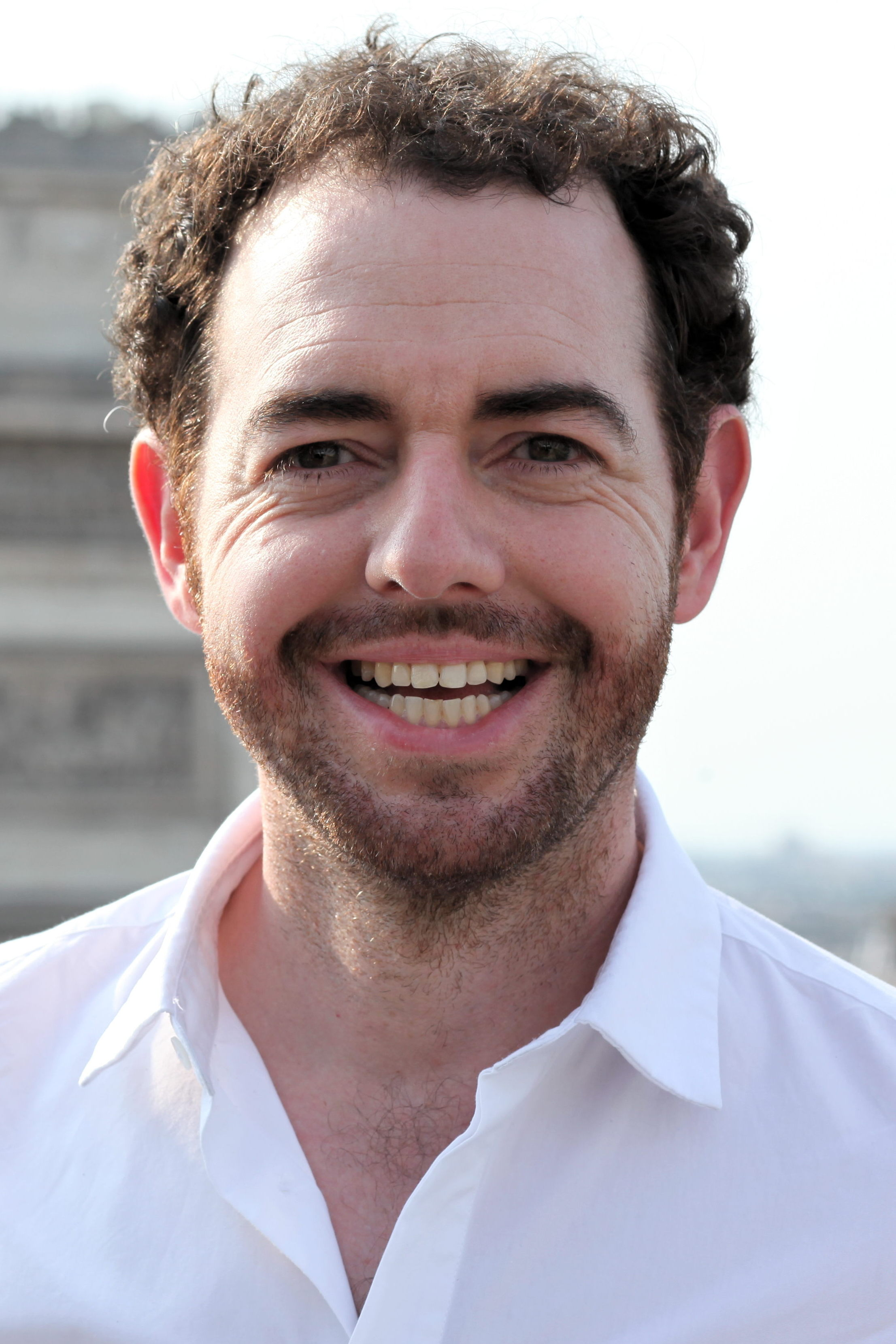

Jean Birnbaum (born 1974) is a French journalist.

== Career ==
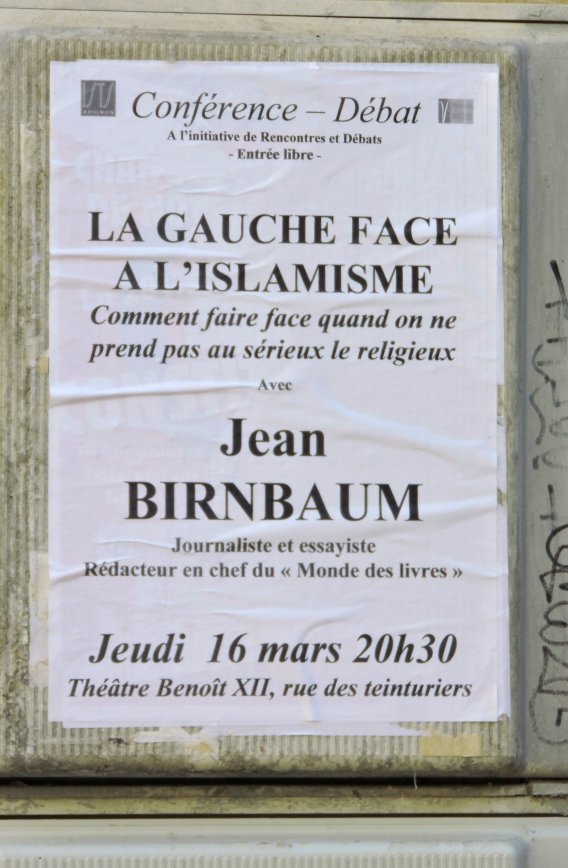
Liberals and Islamism: 2017 conference of Jean Birnbaum in Avignon

Birnbaum started his career in 1997 at France Culture, working on the daily piece Staccato, before working on various other broadcasts.

In 1999, he joined Le Monde. In 2009, he was promoted to aid chief for non-fiction and humanities at Monde des livres. Between 2009 and 2011, he chronicled in Pop’ Philosophie of Monde magazine. In 2011, he rose to director of Monde des livres, a position he has retained as to 2016.

He furthermore took part in the organisation of the "Rencontres de Pétrarque", a yearly one-week meeting in Montpellier organised by Le Monde and France Culture where academics and politicians debate current questions.

From 2007, Birnbaum has coordinated and taken part in the philosophy forum of Le Monde – Le Mans. The event, started in 1989, is a three-day meeting of philosophers, historians, anthropologists, scientists, artists and actors where philosophical questions are debated; it is held at the Palais des congrès et de la culture of Le Mans, and focusses on a different question every year (previous instalments have centred on such question as "why laugh?", "Who are animals?", "love always?"). This forum, which is broadcast on France Culture, is also the subject of a special issue of Monde des livres and of proceedings in the Folio collection of Gallimard.

Birnbaum had authored several essays, notably two on political inheritance among generations: Leur jeunesse et la nôtre : l’espérance révolutionnaire au fil des générations ("Their youth and ours: revolutionary hope among generations") and Les Maoccidents : un néoconservatisme à la française ("The Maoccidents: a French neoconservatism"). He furthermore published the last interview of Jacques Derrida, Apprendre à vivre enfin (translated into English as "Learning to Live Finally") in 2005.

In 2016, Birnbaum published Un silence religieux; La gauche face au djihadisme ("A religious silence : the Left facing jihadism") where he supported the notion that Left-wing frames of interpretation have so far lost contact with religion that it hinders understanding of jihadism, notably that of the Islamic State. The Left would accordingly refuse to recognise a religious nature to jihadism and insist on explaining its use of terrorism by "social misery".».

== Works ==
=== Essays ===
- Leur jeunesse et la nôtre. L'espérance révolutionnaire au fil des générations, Stock, 2005
- Avec Raphaël Chevènement, La face visible de l’homme en noir, Stock, 2006
- Les Maoccidents. Un néoconservatisme à la française, Stock, 2009
- Un silence religieux. La gauche face au djihadisme, Seuil, 2016

=== Anthology ===
- Georges Bernanos face aux imposteurs, présenté par Jean Birnbaum, coll. « Les rebelles », Garnier/Le Monde, 2013

=== Interviews ===
- Jacques Derrida, Apprendre à vivre enfin, Galilée / Le Monde, 2005

==== Co-authored ====
- La Laïcité, une question au présent, sous la direction de Jean Birnbaum et Frédéric Viguier, Ed. Cécile Defaut, 2006
- Philosophes d’hier et d’aujourd’hui, Trente entretiens du Monde des livres, sous la direction de Jean Birnbaum, 2008

==== Proceedings of the Forum philo Le Monde - Le Mans ====
- Femmes, hommes, quelle différence ?, Presse universitaire de Rennes, 2008
- D’où venons-nous ? Retour sur l’origine, Presses universitaires de Rennes, 2009
- Qui sont les animaux ?, Gallimard « Folio », 2010
- Pourquoi rire ?, Gallimard « Folio », 2011
- Où est passé le temps ?, Gallimard « Folio », 2012
- Amour toujours ?, Gallimard, 2013
