= The Art of Struggle =

1996 poetry collection by Michel Houellebecq

- English language cover
- Author: Michel Houellebecq
- Original title: Le Sens du combat
- Translator: Delphine Grass; Timothy Mathews
- Language: French
- Publisher: Flammarion
- Publication date: 25 March 1996
- Publication place: France
- English publication date: 2010
- Pages: 117
- ISBN: 9782080672698

The Art of Struggle (French: Le Sens du combat) is a 1996 poetry collection by the French writer Michel Houellebecq. The poems are in both verse and prose and cover subjects related to everyday life in contemporary Paris. An English translation by Delphine Grass and Timothy Mathews was published in 2010. The book was awarded the 1996 Prix de Flore.

== Reception ==
John Montague reviewed the book for The Times Literary Supplement in 2011:

Baudelaire is Houellebecq's dark master in the lyrics and prose poems of The Art of Struggle; he pays an obvious homage in "Fin de Soirée", which, with its descriptions of a desolate night ("Suspended without any foothold in the world, night might seem long to you"), evokes Baudelaire's "Le Crépuscule du soir" ("Voici le soir charmant, ami du criminel . . ."). ... Paris tends to be defined by monuments; the inverted bathtub of Sacré-Coeur, the Trocadéro facing up to the tapering neck of the Eiffel Tower, the martial bulk of the École Militaire, all now potential targets, or at least scares on the evening news. But Houellebecq's wayfarer wanders through a desert of apartment blocks which is utterly at variance with the popular vision of Paris as a graceful and shimmering city; instead he is like a character in the early cityscapes of T. S. Eliot, unhappy "In the midst of the towers and the ads . . .".

Paul Batchelor wrote in The Guardian:

The argument of Houellebecq's poetry is much the same as that of his fiction: the illusion of diversity has created cultural homogeneity and proscribed individualism. Intimacy is impossible, its place having been taken by casual sexism ("Her secretary meat had passed its date") and morbid attitudinising: "Fortunately, Aids is watching over us." ... The translators, Delphine Grass and Timothy Mathews, have attempted to convey the meaning of the original as accurately as possible, rather than recreate musical effects such as rhyme. This is a legitimate position; but the absence of rhyme is felt sharply because it is so integral a part of Houellebecq's message.
