= Public Enemies: Dueling Writers Take on Each Other and the World =

2008 book by Bernard-Henri Lévy and Michel Houellebecq

- Author: Bernard-Henri Lévy; Michel Houellebecq
- Original title: Ennemis publics
- Language: French
- Publication date: 2008
- Publication place: France
- English publication date: 11 January 2011
- Pages: 332
- ISBN: 978-2-08-121834-5

Public Enemies: Dueling Writers Take on Each Other and the World (French: Ennemis publics) is a collection of letters between the French writers Bernard-Henri Lévy and Michel Houellebecq, published in 2008. It was published in English by Random House on 11 January 2011.

== Summary ==
The philosopher Bernard-Henri Lévy, known for his liberal activism, and the novelist Michel Houellebecq, known for his social satire, exchanged letters for six months in 2008. Subjects include the Israeli–Palestinian conflict, where both support Israel but Houellebecq rejects the value of ethnic identity whereas Lévy describes himself as "a Jew who fights". On the subject of wars in Africa and the rise of Islamism, Lévy accuses Houellebecq of apathy and Houellebecq argues for personal freedom over civic duty, describing exaggerated engagement with humanity as a greater danger.

== Reception ==
Kirkus Reviews called the book engaging but said its allusions to French culture and topical issues can be confusing for international readers. Publishers Weekly said the two writers have large egos and continuously return to themselves as subjects of their discussions, but there is "an undeniable pleasure in being privy to this conversation between these two outsize personalities". Ian Buruma of The New York Times said the book can be read as "a comic novel, a brilliant satire on the vanity of writers", due to Houellebecq's well-attested dark sense of humour and Lévy's "wonderful parody of philosophizing, that is, saying something quite banal in a very complicated way". Buruma concluded: "But I’m afraid to say that none of this is meant to be read as a comic novel. It is all in deadly earnest. As the people Houellebecq has always supported like to say: 'Oy vey!'"
