= The Map and the Territory =

2010 novel by Michel Houellebecq

- English hardcover edition
- Author: Michel Houellebecq
- Original title: La carte et le territoire
- Language: French
- Publisher: Flammarion
- Publication date: 4 September 2010
- Publication place: France
- Pages: 428
- ISBN: 978-2-08-124633-1

The Map and the Territory (French: La carte et le territoire, French pronunciation: [la kaʁt e lə tɛʁitwaʁ]) is a novel by French author Michel Houellebecq. The narrative revolves around a successful artist, and involves a fictional murder of Houellebecq. It was published on 4 September 2010 by Flammarion and received the Prix Goncourt, the most prestigious French literary prize, in 2010. The title is a reference to the map–territory relation.

The Map and the Territory is Michel Houellebecq's fifth novel. It was published five years after his prior novel, The Possibility of an Island. The Map and the Territory was among the most eagerly awaited and discussed novels of the 2010 literary season in France. The first printing was for 120,000 copies, as announced by the publisher. An English translation by Gavin Bowd was published in January 2012.

The Map and the Territory received the Prix Goncourt on 8 November 2010 on the first ballot with seven votes against two for Apocalypse bébé by Virginie Despentes.

== Synopsis ==
The novel tells the story of the life and art of Jed Martin, a fictional French artist who becomes famous by photographing Michelin maps and painting scenes about professional activities. His father is slowly entering old age. Jed falls for a beautiful Russian executive from Michelin but the relationship ends when she returns to Russia. Jed becomes extraordinarily successful after a new series of paintings and therefore suddenly rich as the most prominent artist in France around the year 2010. He meets Michel Houellebecq in Ireland in order to ask him to write the text for the catalog of one of his exhibitions, and in exchange offers to paint the writer's portrait.

A few months later Houellebecq is brutally murdered and Jed Martin gets involved in the case.

== Characters ==
=== Fictional Characters ===
Jed Martin: The novel's protagonist, Jed is a successful artist but feels disconnected from the world around him, eventually retreating into almost complete isolation.

Olga: Olga is a beautiful Russian public relations executive who begins a relationship with Jed during his rise to fame. She eventually returns to Russia, ending their relationship and leaving him alienated once more.

Jean-Pierre Martin: Jed's father, Jean-Pierre was a successful and hardworking architect whose health is now on the wane. His alienation from the world parallels his son's, and the two share an awkward, formal relationship.

Inspector Jasselin: Jasselin is the police detective introduced in the final part of the novel, where he investigates the (fictional) murder of Michel Houellebecq.

=== Metafictional Characters ===
Michel Houellebecq: The author of the novel appears in a metafictional role, first as a friend of the protagonist and later as a murder victim whose death is investigated in the later part of the book.

Frédérick Beigbeder: A real-life French media figure, Beigbeder features in the book during Jed's rise to artistic fame.

== Themes ==
In a televised interview given after the Goncourt award, Houellebecq declared that the main themes of the novel were "aging, the relationship between father and son and the representation of reality through art".

== Accusations of plagiarism ==
The novel incorporates a few abstracts from the French edition of the online encyclopedia Wikipedia without mentioning the source, thus not complying with the Creative Commons licence BY-SA. Flammarion, his publisher, has clarified the issue and noted that Houellebecq often uses existing texts from available documentation and web sites as raw literary material for his novels; for instance, the description of a police officer is taken from the official web site of the Ministry of the Interior and the text of a touristic leaflet is used for the humorous description of the Carpe Diem hotel.

== Reaction after Goncourt award ==
Houellebecq had already been a contender for the Goncourt on two previous occasions. It was the first time since 1980 that the award had gone to a novel published by Flammarion. Houellebecq commented right after the award that "it is a strange feeling, but I am deeply happy" (C'est une sensation bizarre mais je suis profondément heureux).

== Editions ==
- Houellebecq, Michel (4 September 2010). La carte et le territoire. Paris: Flammarion. ISBN 978-2-08-124633-1.
- Houellebecq, Michel (3 January 2012). The Map and the Territory. Trans. Gavin Bowd. New York: Knopf. ISBN 978-0-307-70155-8.

== See also ==
- 2010 in literature
- Contemporary French literature
