= Whatever (novel) =

1994 novel by Michel Houellebecq

- Author: Michel Houellebecq
- Original title: Extension du domaine de la lutte
- Translator: Paul Hammond
- Language: French
- Publisher: Éditions Maurice Nadeau (France); Serpent's Tail (United Kingdom)
- Publication date: 1994
- Publication place: France
- English publication date: 1998

Whatever (French: Extension du domaine de la lutte, literally "extension of the domain of struggle") is the debut novel of French writer Michel Houellebecq. The plot concerns a depressed and isolated computer programmer who tries to convince a colleague to murder a young woman who rejected the colleague's sexual advances. A major theme is that the sexual revolution of the 1960s extended capitalism to the sexual market, creating an unattractive sexual underclass. It was adapted into the 1999 film Whatever, directed by and starring Philippe Harel.

== Plot ==
The unnamed first-person narrator is a 30-year-old analyst-programmer working for a Paris-based computer software company. He is lonely, subject to depression and has not had sex since he broke up with his girlfriend two years earlier. He also writes "animal stories", extracts from which are included in the novel.

He has dinner with a friend from his student days who is now a priest. His friend tells him that the media exaggerates the role of sex in society and that this has led to "vital exhaustion". His friend advises him to re-find God or go into psychoanalysis. Later, the narrator muses that human relationships have become "increasingly impossible" as information technology has reduced them to an exchange of information.

The narrator learns that his company has sold a software program to the Ministry of Agriculture and that he will be required to train the client's staff in the software. His primary contact at the ministry is Catherine Lechardoy, a woman of about the narrator's age whom he describes as "not very attractive". At a social function at the ministry he contemplates making a sexual advance to her. He has no desire for sex with her but "feels up to making the necessary gestures". He decides against it because he doesn't think she would have accepted.

The narrator travels to Rouen with a male colleague named Tisserand in order to conduct training for the ministry staff there. The narrator notes that Tisserand is "extremely ugly. So ugly that his appearance repels women and he never gets to sleep with them". Tisserand tries to become friendly with an attractive female student in a train to Rouen, two "cuties" at the ministry, and several women in a restaurant and a café; his efforts are met with no success. That night, the narrator is struck by acute pericarditis and is hospitalised for two weeks.

After recovering in Paris, the narrator leaves for La Roche-sur-Yon to train the ministry staff there. Tisserand tells him that he is 28 years old and still a virgin. Later, the narrator muses that just as economic liberalism produces extremes of wealth and poverty, a society based on sexual liberalism also produces extremes of sexual gratification and sexual impoverishment. Economic liberalism and sexual liberalism both represent "extensions of the domain of the struggle". He reflects on his former girlfriend Véronique, whom he regrets having ever met. He reflects that psychoanalysis turned her into a woman with a complete lack of moral sense and that "he regrets not taking a knife to her ovaries".

The narrator buys a steak knife and convinces Tisserand to go with him to a disco on Christmas Eve. At the disco, Tisserand starts a conversation with an attractive young woman who the narrator thinks looks like Véronique. The woman, however, breaks off the conversation and starts dancing with "a black guy, or rather half black". The narrator tries to convince Tisserand to embark on a career of murder by killing the young woman, but Tisserand replies that he would rather murder the black man. The young woman and the man leave the disco and drive to a secluded beach on the man's motor scooter. The narrator and Tisserand follow the couple in the narrator's car. The couple go to the sand dunes to have sex, and Tisserand follows them, holding the steak knife the narrator has given him. Tisserand soon returns, stating, "I had no wish to kill them; blood changes nothing." That night, Tisserand dies in a car accident while driving back to Paris.

Back in Paris, the narrator has a depressive episode and calls a psychiatrist. The psychiatrist treats him for depression and the narrator takes sick leave from work. The narrator admits himself into a rest home where he observes the other patients and concludes that they are not at all deranged but merely lacking in love. After several months he leaves the clinic and takes a trip to Saint-Cirgues-en-Montagne. He cycles into the Forest of Mazan, where he feels, "with impressive violence, the possibility of joy".

== Critical analysis ==
=== Themes ===
Carole Sweeney states that a major theme is the "disaggregating effects of post-Fordism on the intimate spaces of human affect" The novel is also a satire on late-twentieth century work culture and consumer society. According to Sweeney, "For the new middle management information class in Whatever society is the comfortable frictionless round of eating ready meals, paying bills on time, attending dutiful work farewell parties, buying beds and CDs..."

Morrey states that the novel may be considered a type of roman à thèse (thesis novel). The French title of the novel alludes to the Marxist theory of class struggle and the narrator's thesis is that the liberalisation of sexuality has led to the extension of struggle to the sexual domain. According to The Independent, Houellebecq's thesis is "that the sexual revolution of the Sixties created not communism but capitalism in the sexual market, that the unattractive underclass is exiled while the privileged initiates are drained by corruption, sloth, and excess." Adam Kirsch of The New York Times has called the character Tisserand a "proto-incel" and states that the novel predicted the modern incel movement.

Other themes of the novel include the link between "the 'economisation' of sexuality" and violence, depression, psychiatry and euthanasia. Morrey identifies a theme of "depressive lucidity" in the face of the struggle against the rules of modern society. The narrator does not believe in self-improvement and social progress. According to Morrey, "he too feels sorry for his fellow humans but there is nothing he can do...The consequence of Houellebecq’s (narrators’) depressive lucidity, in other words, is a chronic inability to act."

=== Style ===
Sweeney states that the novel is "part-essay, part-satire, arguably by most principles of literary convention, Whatever barely qualifies as a novel at all." The tone of the novel has been described as blank and compared to that of Camus' The Stranger. Morrey, however, states that Houellebecq's frequent use of "sudden exclamations, dark ironies, hyperbole and hysterical outbursts" distinguish the tone from Camus'. The novel frequently switches between literary and colloquial registers; according to Morrey, this gives the novel a "troubling, unstable tone". Morrey states that the narrator's use of "alien, inappropriate remarks that seem to come out of nowhere" makes the reader unsure whether he should be taken seriously.
