= Marc-Édouard Nabe =

French writer (born 1958)

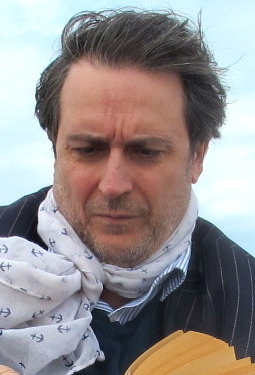
- Nabe in 2015
- Born: Alain Marc Édouard Zannini; 27 December 1958 (age 67); Marseille, France.
- Occupations: Writer, painter, cartoonist
- Years active: 1974–present
- Children: 1
- Parent: Marcel Zanini
- Website: marcedouardnabe.com

Marc-Édouard Nabe (born Alain Marc Édouard Zannini; 27 December 1958) is a French writer, painter and jazz guitarist.

After drawing cartoons for several publications including Hara-Kiri, Nabe published his first book Au régal des vermines in 1985 and caused controversy when he appeared on French television to promote it.

After having 27 books published by various French publishers, Nabe announced in 2010 that he was now self-publishing and invented the concept of 'anti-édition' ('anti-publishing'), which he described as self-publishing for an author who is already well-known. He was shortlisted for the 2010 Prix Renaudot for his novel L'Homme qui arrêta d'écrire, which became the first self-published book to be shortlisted for a major literary prize in France.

== Biography ==
=== Youth and first publications ===
Nabe was born Alain Marc Édouard Zannini in Marseille. He is the only son of the Greek-Turkish-Italian jazz musician Marcel Zanini and Corsican mother Suzanne Zannini. His family moved to Boulogne-Billancourt in 1969. His father became successful with the radio hit Tu veux ou tu veux pas in 1970 and introduced him to many jazz musicians.

At 15 years old, Nabe went to visit the team of magazine Hara-Kiri and submitted his cartoons to cartoonists Georges Wolinski, Gébé and publishing director Professeur Choron. Some of his work was published, with Nabe taking a pen name by combining his middle names with a diminutive of 'nabot', a French pejorative word for short people that his schoolmates used to tease him with. In January 1975, one of Nabe's cartoons appeared on the front cover of newspaper Libération. In 1976, he played the rhythm guitar on one track of his father Marcel Zanini's record Blues and Bounce!, alongside drummer Sam Woodyard and organist Milt Buckner. The track's title, Nabe's Dream, became the title of the first volume of his diary, published in 1991.

Nabe met Hélène Hottiaux after his one-year national service in Charleville-Mezières in 1980. He extensively described their relationship in his diary as well as in the novel Alain Zannini. Their son, Alexandre Zannini, was born in 1990.

From 1982 onwards, Nabe wrote texts and articles for many publications, including Philippe Sollers's L'Infini and Jean-Edern Hallier's L'Idiot International. Many of these texts were collected in Oui and Non in 1998.

=== First books and media appearances ===
Nabe's first book, Au régal des vermines, was published in January 1985 by Bernard Barrault. An essay in the tradition of the French lampoon, the book expresses Nabe's views on a number of topics including jazz, literature, art, sexuality, racism and his parents on a polemical, lyrical or satirical tone. In February 1985, Nabe appeared on the literary TV program Apostrophes to present his book. A heated debate occurred between Nabe and the other guests regarding some of Nabe's avowed and controversial literary influences, such as Louis-Ferdinand Céline, Léon Bloy, and Lucien Rebatet. Writer Morgan Sportès read out selected extracts of Nabe's book and accused him of being racist and antisemitic, which led Nabe to assert that there was no reason for the Jews to escape his diatribe. Whilst on the topic, Nabe accused the French association LICRA of making profit by exploiting the horror of the Holocaust. After the show, anti-racist campaigner Georges-Marc Benamou burst in the studio and assaulted Nabe, punching him in the face. The LICRA sued Nabe for defamation and incitement to ethnic or racial hatred, but the charges were dropped in 1989.

In 1986, Nabe published his second book, Zigzags, a compilation of various texts (essays, short stories, poetry). His third book, L'âme de Billie Holiday ("Billie Holiday's soul"), was an essay centred on the jazz-singer Billie Holiday. In the same year, a collection of aphorisms, Chacun mes goûts, was published by Le Dilettante. His first novel, Le Bonheur ('Happiness'), was published by Denoël in 1988. It relates the story of Andrea de Bocumar (an anagram of Nabe's pen name), a painter who is hired as an assistant by a mysterious contemporary artist and must travel to Italy to copy Renaissance paintings of feet on levitation. The trip is interrupted by a stay at Bocumar's family in Marseille, where autobiographical and fictional situations and characters are blended in the style of a picaresque novel. In 1989, Nabe opposed the celebration of the bicentenary of the French Revolution by writing La Marseillaise, an essay about free-jazz musician Alber Ayler's version of the French national anthem.

Invited by Jean-Edern Hallier to join the team of L'Idiot International, Nabe collaborated to the newspaper from 1989 to 1990, alongside Eduard Limonov or Jacques Vergès amongst other figures. Articles written by Nabe for this publication included a virulent piece on singer Serge Gainsbourg, a text which Hallier himself deemed "infamous".

=== Publication of his diary and travels ===
Between 1991 and 2000, four volumes of Nabe's diary were published (Nabe's Dream, 1991; Tohu-Bohu, 1993; Inch'Allah, 1996; Kamikaze, 2000). The first volume ended with the depiction of Nabe's 1985 appearance in Apostrophes. These diaries covered intimate details of his personal life as well as his encounters with various celebrities of the Parisian artistic and cultural milieu, the depiction of which brought him many enmities.

Other essays also dealt with Nabe's personal life: Visage de turc en pleurs, edited by Philippe Sollers, relates Nabe's journey to Turkey, where his father was born. In L'Âge du Christ, Nabe writes on his approach to catholic faith and describes his First Communion in Jerusalem.

A frequent visitor to Louis-Ferdinand Céline's widow Lucette Destouches, Nabe portrayed her in this 1995 novel Lucette. The book only depicted real events from the point of view of actor and director Jean-François Stévenin, with no mention or appearance of Nabe himself. In 1997, Nabe created a newspaper publication, L'Eternité, which contained articles written by Nabe only, along with illustrations by cartoonists Frédéric Pajak and Philippe Vuillemin. Publication ended after two issues.

In the mid-1990s, Nabe lived in the same building as writer Michel Houellebecq. Nabe later addressed this fact in Le Vingt-Septième Livre (2009), by evoking Houellebecq's critical and commercial success as opposed to his own marginalization. He compared their works by contrasting his own predilection for transcendence, lyricism and excess with Houellebecq's minimalist prose and concerns for depression and sexual misery in the Western capitalistic world.

Following the publication of four volumes of his diary, Nabe left Paris for a seven-months exile on the Greek island of Patmos, where the Apocalypse of John is said to have been written. There, he used material from his unpublished diary covering the years 1991 to 2000 to write the novel Alain Zannini, then burned the diary manuscripts. Nabe claimed that this act was necessary in order to transform his diaristic writing into novelistic writing, and that too many of his friends had been hurt by the publication of the previous volumes. He also said that there was no point publishing his diary now that anyone could write a blog online, and that he had sensed that it would soon become increasingly difficult to get his diary published. The resulting novel Alain Zanini was released in 2002 and longlisted for the 2002 Prix Goncourt.

Shortly after the terrorist attacks in the United States on 11 September 2001, Nabe reacted to the event by writing an essay entitled Une lueur d'espoir ('A Glimmer of Hope'), in which he commented on the media coverage of the event and asserted that Osama bin Laden was acting in self-defence against the USA. Nabe's interest in the conflicts in the Middle-East led him to travel to Iraq prior to its American invasion in 2003. The trip served as material for the novel Printemps de Feu.

=== Break-up with the publishing industry and hiatus ===
In 2005, Éditions du Rocher was sold to a pharmaceutical business. Prior to that, Nabe used to receive monthly payments in exchange for yielding his royalties, according to a non-written contract. Following the sale, the publishing house ended the publication of Nabe's books and Nabe sued the company, thus retrieving the copyright ownership of all of his works. Finding himself without a publisher, Nabe spent the following years writing 'tracts', broadsides dealing with controversial current affairs and pasted on public walls all around Paris. Topics covered included euthanasia, the 2006 Prix Goncourt handed to Jonathan Littell, the accusations of antisemitism faced by cartoonist Siné, Zinedine Zidane's headbutting of Marco Materazzi during the 2006 FIFA World Cup Final, the 2007 French presidential election and Iran's nuclear program.

=== Self-publishing as 'anti-publishing' ===
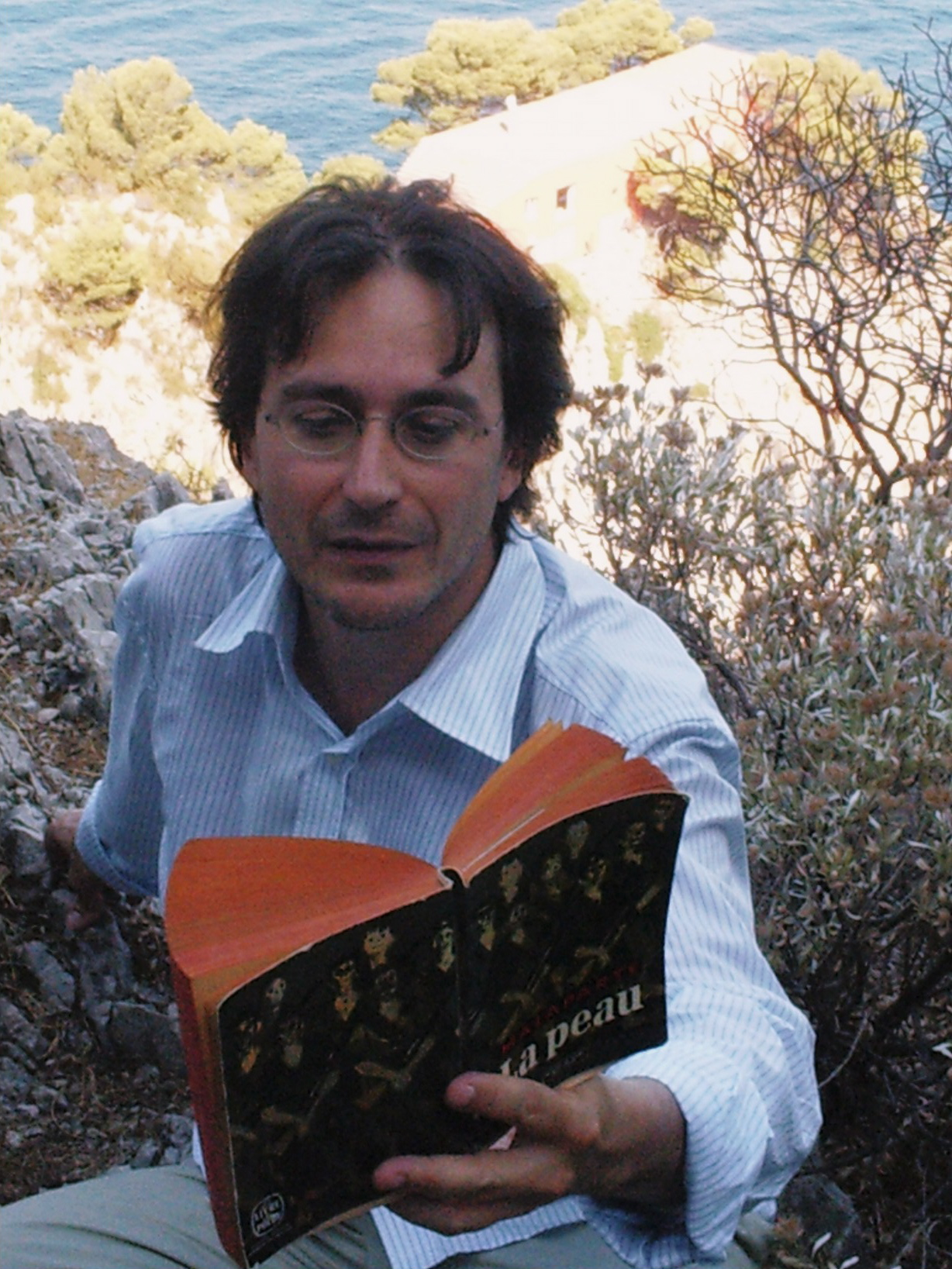
Nabe reading Malaparte's The Skin at Casa Malaparte in Capri

In January 2010, Nabe announced that he was now self-publishing and coined the phrase 'anti-édition' ('anti-publishing') to describe his approach. He stated that 'anti-publishing' was a way for an author who had already been published within the literary system to get out of it and create an alternative system. In this sense it would differ from regular self-publishing. Nabe opened an online shop to sell his own books, starting with the novel L'Homme qui arrêta d'écrire ("The Man who Stopped Writing"). The book was shortlisted for the Prix Renaudot, something which had not yet happened to a self-published novel. The prize eventually went to Virginie Despentes. The following year, he self-published L'Enculé, a novel inspired by the Dominique Strauss-Kahn affair.

In January 2014, during an appearance on French TV show Ce soir (ou jamais !) where he was invited to give his views on the Dieudonné affair, Nabe announced that he was writing a 1,000 pages long essay opposing the rise of conspiracy theories, including Holocaust denial and theories on 9/11 promoted in France by comedian Dieudonné and right-wing essayist and militant Alain Soral. The book was eventually released in 2017 as Les Porcs 1, followed by Les Porcs 2 in 2021. A third volume is due to complete the trilogy.

In December 2014, Nabe created Patience, a magazine entirely written by himself, with a first issue discussing the rise of the Islamic State of Iraq and the Levant. A second issue was published in August 2015, under the title La revanche de Choron ('Choron's revenge'). Its 152-page long article dealt with the Charlie Hebdo shooting, which it presented as an act of justice indirectly avenging Professeur Choron, the co-founder of the first version of Charlie Hebdo (1970 to 1981) who had been evicted from the publication. The cover featured a picture of Adolf Hitler holding a Je Suis Charlie sign. The magazine was self-promoted with a publicity stunt during the announcement of the winners of the 2015 Prix Goncourt and Prix Renaudot.

The rise of the Gilets Jaunes protests in France in late 2018 quickly prompted Nabe to write an essay on the movement. In Aux râts des pâquerettes, published in February 2019, he blamed the protesters for being too mild and resigned to police brutality, whilst suggesting that violence and commitment are inherent to revolution, citing Nechayev's Catechism of a Revolutionary as an example. A theatrical adaptation of the book as a monologue was produced and performed by actor Paco Balabanov in October 2019 in Paris.

In February 2020, the magazine Valeurs actuelles branded Nabe "the most censored writer in France".

== Musical activity ==
In the 2000s, Nabe played the guitar on recordings by the band Les Primitifs du Futur, alongside cartoonist Robert Crumb.

== Works ==
=== Non-fiction ===
- Au Régal des vermines 1985; republished with an added preface in 2006; third edition self-published in 2012
- Zigzags, 1986
- Chacun mes goûts, 1986
- L'Âme de Billie Holiday, 1986, second edition in 2006
- La Marseillaise, 1989
- Rideau, 1992
- Visage de Turc en pleurs, 1992
- Petits riens sur presque tout, 1992
- L'Âge du Christ, 1992
- Nuage, 1993
- Oui, 1998
- Non, 1998
- Coups d'Épée dans l'eau, 1999
- Une lueur d'espoir, 2001
- J'enfonce le clou, 2004
- Le Vingt-Septième Livre, 2009
- Les Porcs 1, 2017
- Aux rats des pâquerettes, 2019
- Les Porcs 2, 2021

=== Diary ===
- I, Nabe's Dream, 1991
- II, Tohu-Bohu, 1993
- III, Inch'Allah, 1996
- IV, Kamikaze, 2000

=== Novels ===
- Le Bonheur, 1988
- Lucette, 1995, second edition in 2012.
- Je suis mort, 1998
- Alain Zannini, 2002
- Printemps de feu, 2003
- L'Homme qui arrêta d'écrire, 2010.
- L'Enculé, 2011.

=== Poetry ===
- Loin des fleurs, 1998

=== Short stories ===
- K.-O. et autres contes, 1999

=== Other works ===
- L'affaire Zannini, 2003
- Morceaux choisis, 2006
