= L'Herne =

L'Herne is a French independent publishing house known for its collection Cahiers de L'Herne.

== History ==
L'Herne is an independent publishing house located near the Institut de France and directed by Laurence Tacou. It was founded in 1963 with Dominique de Roux.

The first journals were devoted to well-known names in literature, philosophy and poetry, such as Jorge Luis Borges, Witold Gombrowicz, Louis Massignon, Louis-Ferdinand Céline, Thomas Mann, Fyodor Dostoyevsky, Friedrich Hölderlin, Henry Corbin and Emmanuel Levinas. Beginning in 2000, L'Herne shifted its focus to philosophers, critics, and contemporary novelists such as Sigmund Freud, Albert Camus, Pablo Picasso, Paul Ricoeur, Claude Lévi-Strauss, Carlos Fuentes, Noam Chomsky, Colette, Vargas Llosa, Patrick Modiano, Simone de Beauvoir, Joseph Conrad, Joseph Roth, Michel Houellebecq.

These journals assemble unpublished documents, recollections, and testimonies. L'Herne has worked with more than four thousand collaborators, writers, academics, and translators from around the world.

== Carnets de L'Herne ==
Les Carnets de L'Herne opened in 2002. It publishes contemporary and classical texts, often unknown and rare such as unpublished or missing work. This collection features the works of more than 120 writers, including Chomsky, St Augustine, Beauvoir and Françoise Sagan.

== Essais ==
The collection Essais is an editorial journal. It offers comments and reflections of writers and how they relate to current issues.

== Cave Canem ==
Cave Canem provides a forum for dissidents and protesters around the world. The first issue featured the writings of the chess champion Garry Kasparov, who denounced the abuses of the Russian regime led by Vladimir Putin. This was followed by Noam Chomsky’s book on the Occupy movement and Justice for Palestine! by the Russell Tribunal on Palestine.

== Cahiers d'Anthropologie Sociale ==
In partnership with the Collège de France, L'Herne publishes the collection of Cahiers d’Anthropologie Sociale under the patronage of Claude Lévi-Strauss, Philippe Descola and Françoise Héritier. The eleven book collection contains the work done in the Laboratory of Social Anthropology at the Collège de France, offering an anthropological approach on major topical issues.

== Romans and Écrits ==
Romans and Écrits gather the contemporary and classic works of both foreign and French writers. This collection includes the work of Walter Benjamin, Marguerite Duras, Elizabeth Gaskell, Anthony Trollope, Colette, Franz Hessel, Jose Maria Arguedas, etc.
