= Platform (novel) =

2001 novel by Michel Houellebecq

- Cover of the U.S. paperback release of the novel.
- Author: Michel Houellebecq
- Original title: Plateforme
- Language: French
- Genre: novel
- Publisher: Flammarion
- Publication date: 2001
- English publication date: 2002

Platform (French: Plateforme) is a 2001 novel by French writer Michel Houellebecq. It is about a misanthropic Frenchman who meets a woman in Thailand with whom he starts a travel agency that offers package holidays for sex tourists. It was translated into English by Frank Wynne in 2002.

== Plot summary ==
The story is the first-person narrative of a fictional character named Michel Renault, a Parisian civil servant who, after the murder of his father by muslim migrants (an honor crime) and thanks to a hefty inheritance, engages in sex tourism in Thailand, where he meets a travel agent named Valérie. Valérie and Renault begin an affair, and, after moving back to France, hatch a plan with Valérie's boss (who works in the travel industry in the Aurore group, an allusion to the real-life Accor group) to launch a new variety of package holiday called "friendly tourism", implicitly aimed at Europeans looking for a sexual experience whilst on vacation. Single men and women—and even couples—are to be targeted, and would vacation in specially designed "Aphrodite Clubs".

Initially, the name "Venus clubs"—an allusion to the Villa Venus clubs dreamed of by Eric Veen in Vladimir Nabokov's classic Ada or Ardor—is suggested. However, this is rejected as being too explicit. It is decided that Thailand is the best location for the new clubs, with the advertising making it clear that Thai women would also be easily available. The tours are to be marketed predominantly to German consumers, as it is perceived that there will be less moral outrage in Germany than in France.

Michel, Valérie and her boss Jean-Yves travel to Thailand on one of their company's tours incognito and enjoy an idyllic holiday. They decide that they will move to Thailand permanently, to perpetuate the bliss they experience there. However, towards the end of their holiday, Muslim extremists commit a terrorist act in which Valérie is killed. Michel is left bereft, and at the end of the novel he travels back to Thailand to die.

== Characters ==
Michel Renault: The protagonist and narrator, Michel is a middle-aged Parisian civil servant who inherits a large fortune from his estranged father. Using this inheritance, he engages in sex tourism in Thailand where he Valérie, a French travel agent, who renews his numb existence. Michel and Valérie later plan to relocate permanently to Thailand but Valérie is killed in a terrorist attack there and a bereft Michel laters intends to commit suicide.

Valérie: A French travel agent, Valérie meets Michel in Thailand and they begin a relationship. Throughout the book she is portrayed as hopeful and exciting, as opposed to Michel's dour pessimism. At the end of the novel Valérie is killed in a terrorist attack committed by Muslim extremists.

Jean-Yves Fréhaut: Valérie's boss and a senior travel executive, Jean-Yves is persuaded by Valérie and Michel to experiment with a new holiday package explicitly modelled around sex tourism. Jean-Yves is in a loveless, non-intimate marriage with wife Audrey.

Audrey Fréhaut: Audrey is Jean-Yves wife and like him she is a successful professional, in her a lawyer. Audrey and Jean-Yves are emotionally and intimately distant from one another and unbeknownst to Jean-Yves, Audrey frequent underground clubs where she performs as a dominatrix.

Robert: A fellow tourist to Thailand on the same program as Michel and Valérie, Robert is a nihilistic and enthusiastic patron of sex tourism.

Lionel: Lionel is another member of the Thailand tour, alongside Michel, Valérie, and Robert, but unlike the latter he is an innocent, working-class young man eager to compensate for his staid life in France by indulging in sex tourism abroad. Lionel later dies of injuries he sustained in the same terrorist attack that kills Valérie.

Michel's father: Michel's father is never named or featured alive in the novel but the inheritance he bequeaths to Michel allows the latter to make the trip to Thailand where he meets Valérie. Michel's father is killed in an honour killing after he is involved with a Muslim girl, whose family seeks to avenge what they perceive as his shaming of her.

== Reception ==
Reviews of Platform have been mixed, with some critics praising the book while others criticised it for its perceived anti-Islamic stance. In an article in the Guardian about the legal fallout of the novel in France, Salman Rushdie said "Platform is a good novel and Houellebecq is a fine writer who writes for serious reasons". Another positive review came in 2024 from Simon Heffer in the Telegraph, who called Platform "a superb novel" and called Houellebecq "France's leading novelist".

Other reviews were less complementary. Also writing in the Guardian, James Buchan said Houellebecq's works "reads like an adolescent." Of Platform, specifically, Buchan said it is "so bland, ill-informed and self-consciously tedious". Likewise, Jenny Turner, in a review for the New York Times, said Houellebecq can be "a terrific writer, funny and prophetic" but also called him "vulgar, often silly, sex-obsessed." About the book, Turner said it was "a disaster, poorly organized and incoherent and rather crass."

== Legacy ==
After describing Islam as "the most stupid religion" in a published interview about the book, Houellebecq was charged for inciting racial and religious hatred but the charges were ultimately dismissed, as it has been ruled that the right to free speech encompasses the right to criticize religions. The novel and its author have been deemed "prophetic" or "prescient", as the last part depicts an Islamic terrorist attack which bears strong similarities with the bombings in Bali in October 2002, about a year later (and the novel was published on 27 August 2001, a few days before the 11 September 2001 attacks). A similar coincidence, involving Houellebecq, Islam and terrorism, would occur 13 years later, when his novel Submission, dealing with Islam again (although in a more nuanced and less confrontational way), was published on 7 January 2015, the day of the Charlie Hebdo shooting.

== Adaptations ==
A play in Spanish based on the book, adapted and directed by Calixto Bieito, premiered at the 2006 Edinburgh International Festival.

Alain Dual adapted the novel into the 2014 comic book Plateforme. Dual corresponded with Houellebecq throughout the process and receiving input about dialogues and possible improvements.

== See also ==
- Sex tourism
- Bali Bombings
- Michel Houellebecq
- Submission (novel)
