= Lanzarote (novel) =

2000 novella by Michel Houellebecq

Cover of UK paperback edition of Lanzarote

Lanzarote is a novella by the French author Michel Houellebecq, published in France in 2000 from a draft written at an unspecified earlier time.

It was translated to English by Frank Wynne in 2003.
