= The Possibility of an Island =

2005 novel by Michel Houellebecq

- Cover of the UK hardcover edition
- Author: Michel Houellebecq
- Original title: La Possibilité d'une île
- Translator: Gavin Bowd
- Language: French
- Publisher: Knopf
- Publication date: 2005
- Publication place: France
- English publication date: May 23, 2006
- Media type: Print, e-book
- Pages: 352
- ISBN: 978-0307263490

The Possibility of an Island (French: La Possibilité d'une île) is a 2005 novel by French novelist Michel Houellebecq, set within a cloning cult that resembles the real-world Raëlians.

== Plot summary ==
There are three main characters – Daniel and two of his clones.

Daniel is a successful comedian who can't seem to enjoy life despite his wealth. He gets bored with his hedonist lifestyle, but can't escape from it either. Meanwhile, he is disgruntled with the state of current society, and philosophizes about the nature of sex and love.

His two clones live an uneventful life as hermits, in a post-apocalyptic future. They live in a time where the human species is on its last legs (or, alternatively, on its first legs, as they have returned to societies of hunter-gatherer tribes), destroyed by climate change and nuclear war. The two clones are confronted with the life of the first Daniel and have different views about their predecessor. Scattered around are the remnants of tourist resorts, cities and consumer items and some natural humans living in small tribes without any knowledge of the past or of civilization.

== Related media ==
- A film based on the novel, La Possibilité d'une île, premiered in France on September 10, 2008. The film was directed by Houellebecq himself.
- An excerpt from the novel is featured on the music album Comme si de rien n'était by Carla Bruni (track 2).
- The novel inspired Iggy Pop's 2009 album Préliminaires.
