= Michel Houellebecq =

French writer (born 1956)

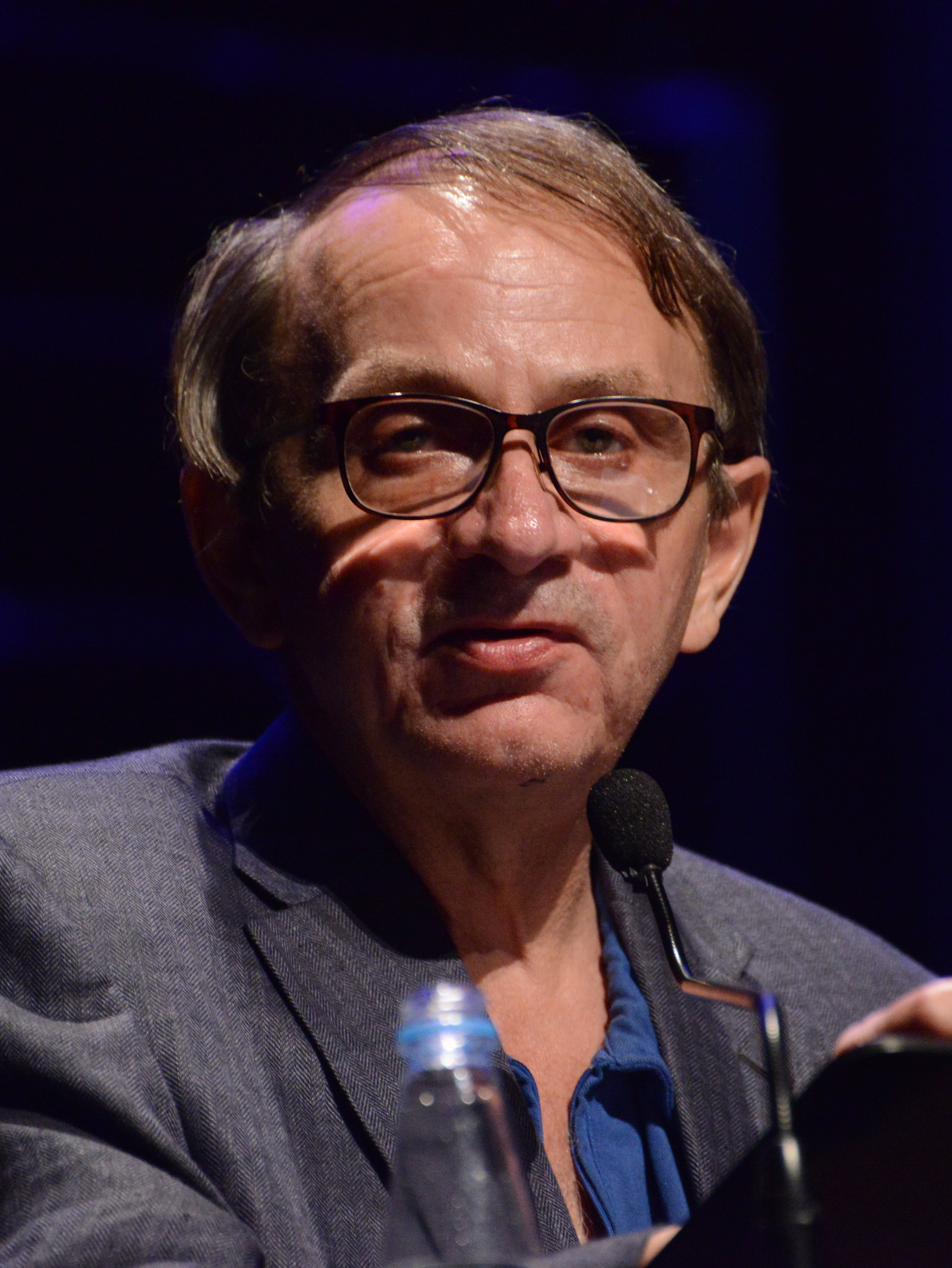
- Houellebecq in 2016
- Born: Michel Thomas; 26 February 1956 (age 70); Réunion, France
- Education: INA P-G
- Occupations: Novelist; poet; filmmaker
- Spouses: Identity unknown (m. 1980, divorced); Marie-Pierre Gauthier (m. 1998; div. 2010); Qianyun Lysis Li (m. 2018)
- Children: 1
- Writing career
- Notable works: Atomised (1998); Platform (2001); The Map and the Territory (2010); Submission (2015); Annihilation (2022)
- Notable awards: Prix Novembre (1998); International Dublin Literary Award (2002); Prix Goncourt (2010); Austrian State Prize for European Literature (2019); Jerusalem Prize (2025)

Michel Houellebecq (French pronunciation: [miʃɛl wɛlbɛk]; born Michel Thomas on 26 February 1956) is a French author of novels, poems, and essays, as well as an occasional actor, filmmaker, and singer. His first book was a monograph on the horror writer H. P. Lovecraft. Houellebecq published his first novel Whatever in 1994 and his second, Atomised, in 1998, to international fame as well as controversy. He has published several books of poetry, including The Art of Struggle in 1996.

An offhand remark about Islam during a publicity tour for his 2001 novel Platform led to Houellebecq being taken to court for inciting racial hatred. He was eventually cleared of all charges. He subsequently moved to Ireland for several years, before moving back to France. In 2010, he published The Map and the Territory, which won the prestigious Prix Goncourt. In 2015, his novel Submission sparked controversy for its depiction of Islam and was accused of plagiarism in a lawsuit later deemed inadmissible. Annihilation was published in 2022. He was described in 2015 as "France's biggest literary export and, some say, greatest living writer" and called himself "probably islamophobic". In a 2017 Deutsche Welle article, he is dubbed the "undisputed star, and enfant terrible, of modern French literature".

== Early life and education ==
Houellebecq was born Michel Thomas on the French island of Réunion in 1956. His mother Lucie Ceccaldi was a French physician of Corsican descent, born in Algeria, his father René Thomas was a ski instructor and mountain guide. Houellebecq's official date of birth is 26 February 1956, although he has sometimes stated that he may have actually been born in 1958. (Note: In his own 2005 autobiographical account, "Mourir", published on his – now defunct – personal website following the publication of the aforementioned biography, the author explained that he was "more likely" born in 1958, and that his mother, by her own admission, managed to have the date changed on his birth certificate to allow him to enter school at age four, as she was convinced that he was intellectually gifted. "I was born in 1956 or in 1958, I don't know. More likely in 1958. My mother always told me that she had faked the birth certificate so that I could go to school at age four instead of six – I guess that there was no pre-school at the time. She had convinced herself that I was intellectually precocious [un surdoué] — because at age three, so was I told, I had learned to read by myself, using cubes, and one evening coming home she had found me, utterly surprised, casually reading the newspaper. That she may have had the power to do so, there is no doubt: the birth certificates were handwritten and roughly made, and she really was among the dignitaries in La Réunion, she had influent acquaintances [...].")

He lived in Algeria from the age of five months until 1961, with his paternal grandmother. In a lengthy autobiographical article published on his website (now defunct), he states that his parents "lost interest in [his] existence pretty quickly", and at the age of six, he was sent to France to live with his paternal grandmother, a communist, while his mother left to live a hippie lifestyle in Brazil with her recent boyfriend. His grandmother's maiden name was Houellebecq, which he took as his pen name. Later, he went to Lycée Henri Moissan, a high school at Meaux north-east of Paris, as a boarder. He then went to Lycée Chaptal in Paris to follow preparation courses in order to qualify for grandes écoles (elite schools). He began attending the Institut National Agronomique Paris-Grignon in 1975. He started a literary review called Karamazov (named after Fyodor Dostoevsky's last novel) and wrote poetry. He graduated in 1980.

== Career ==
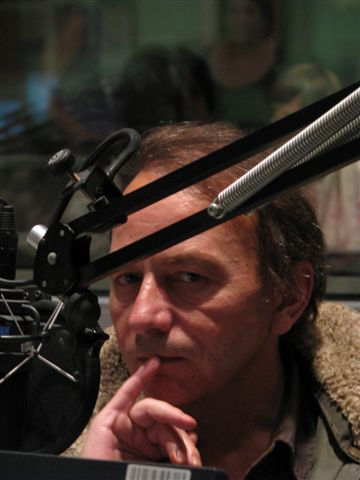
Michel Houellebecq, Warsaw, June 2008

Houellebecq worked as a computer administrator in Paris, including at the French National Assembly to support himself as a writer. His first poems appeared in 1985 in the magazine La Nouvelle Revue. Six years later, in 1991, he published a biographical essay on the horror writer H. P. Lovecraft, a teenage passion, with the programmatic subtitle Against the World, Against Life. A short poetical essay named Rester vivant : méthode (To Stay Alive) appeared the same year, dealing with the art of writing as a way of life – or rather, a way of not-dying and being able to write in spite of apathy and disgust for life. It was followed by his first collection of poetry, La poursuite du bonheur (The pursuit of happiness).

In 1994 his debut novel Extension du domaine de la lutte was published and he started to gain fame. Eventually he became the so-called "pop star of the single generation".

Throughout the 1990s, Houellebecq published several books of poetry, including The Art of Struggle in 1996, which, in a 2005 video interview for the magazine Les Inrockuptibles, he cited as his most accomplished book to date, the one he would usually choose if compelled to read whatever he wanted among his published works, and articles in magazines such as Les Inrockuptibles or more confidential literary publications such as L'Infini edited by Philippe Sollers). Most of those texts were later collected in Interventions (1998, expanded in 2009 and 2020).

At that time, he lived at the same address as fellow writer Marc-Édouard Nabe, at 103, rue de la Convention in Paris. Nabe wrote about this proximity in Le Vingt-Septième Livre (2006), comparing both neighbours' careers and the way their writings were met by critics and audiences.

An offhand remark about Islam during a publicity tour for his 2001 novel Plateforme led to Houellebecq being taken to court for inciting racial hatred. He was eventually cleared of all charges. He subsequently moved to Ireland for several years, before moving back to France.

== Works ==
His debut novel Extension du domaine de la lutte was published by Maurice Nadeau, a first-person narrative, alternating between realistic accounts of the (unnamed) protagonist's bleak and solitary life as a computer programmer, and his idiosyncratic musings about society, some of which are presented in the form of "animal fictions"; he teams up with an even more desperate colleague (he is a virgin at the age of 28) who later gets killed in a car accident, which triggers the narrator's mental breakdown and eventual admission in a psychiatric hospital; even there, he theorizes about his condition being the direct result of the contemporary social configuration, rather than a personal failure or mental illness.

In 1998 his second novel, Les Particules Élémentaires translated by Frank Wynne and published in the English-speaking world as Atomised in the UK, or The Elementary Particles in the US was a breakthrough, bringing him national and soon international fame and controversy for its intricate mix of brutally honest social commentary and pornographic depictions (two years earlier, in 1996, while working on that novel, being interviewed by Andrew Hussey, he had presciently said: "It will either destroy me or make me famous.") It narrates the fate of two half brothers who grew up in the troubled 1960s: Michel Djerzinski, who became a prominent biologist, highly successful as a scientist but utterly withdrawn and depressed, and Bruno Clément, a French teacher, deeply disturbed and obsessed by sex; Djerzinski eventually triggers what is labelled as the "third metaphysical mutation" by retro-engineering the human species into immortal neo-humans. The book won the 1998 Prix Novembre (which was renamed Prix Décembre, following the resignation of its founder who disapproved of the prize being given to Houellebecq), missing the more prestigious Prix Goncourt for which it was the favourite. The novel became an instant "nihilistic classic" and was mostly praised for the boldness of its ideas and thought-provoking qualities, although it was also heavily criticized for its relentless bleakness and vivid depictions of racism, paedophilia, and torture, as well as for being an apology for eugenics. (Michiko Kakutani described it in The New York Times as "a deeply repugnant read".) The novel won Houellebecq (along with his translator, Frank Wynne) the International Dublin Literary Award in 2002.

In 2000, Houellebecq published the short fiction Lanzarote published in France with a volume of his photographs, in which he explores a number of the themes he would develop in later novels, including sex tourism and fringe religions.

His subsequent novel, Plateforme (2001), was another critical and commercial success. A first-person romance narrated by a 40-year-old male arts administrator named Michel, who shares many real-life characteristics with the author, including his apathy and low self-esteem, it includes a depiction of life as hopeless, as well as numerous sex scenes, some of which display an approving attitude towards prostitution and sex tourism.

The novel's explicit criticism of Islam—the story ends with the depiction of a terrorist attack on a sex tourism venue, later compared to the Bali bombings which happened the following year—together with an interview its author gave to the magazine Lire in which he described Islam as "the dumbest religion," which remark led to accusations of incitement to ethnic or racial hatred against Houellebecq by several organisations, including France's Human Rights League, the Mecca-based World Islamic League as well as the mosques of Paris and Lyon. Charges were brought to trial, but a panel of three judges, delivering their verdict to a packed Paris courtroom, acquitted the author of having provoked 'racial' hatred, ascribing Houellebecq's opinions to the legitimate right of criticizing religions. The huge controversy in the media subsided following the terrorist attacks of September 11, 2001.

His next novel, La Possibilité d'une île (2005), cycles between three characters' narratives: Daniel 1, a contemporary stand-up comedian and movie maker renowned for his extreme causticity, alternating with Daniel 24 and then Daniel 25, neo-human clones of Daniel 1 in a far future; Daniel 1 witnesses dramatic events by which a sect named the Elohimites (based on Raëlism) changes the course of history, and his autobiography constitutes a canonical account that his clones are compelled to study, both in order to acquaint themselves with their model / ancestor's troubled character (since the Elohimites' chief scientist's purported project of mind uploading turned out to be a failure) and to distance themselves from the flaws of humans. Houellebecq later adapted and directed a movie based on this novel, which was a critical and commercial failure.

In 2008, Flammarion published Public Enemies: Dueling Writers Take on Each Other and the World (Ennemis publics), a conversation via e-mail between Houellebecq and Bernard-Henri Lévy, in which both reflected on their controversial reception by the mainstream media, and elaborated on their tastes and influences in literature, among other topics.

Houellebecq has also released three music albums on which he recites or sings selected excerpts from his poetry. Two of them were recorded with composer Jean-Jacques Birgé: Le sens du combat (1996, Radio France) and Établissement d'un ciel d'alternance (2007, Grrr Records, which Houellebecq considers the best of his recording endeavours, as handwritten in the libretto). Présence humaine (released in 2000 on Bertrand Burgalat's Tricatel label, and featuring musical arrangements by Burgalat himself), has a rock band backing him, and has been compared to the works of Serge Gainsbourg in the 1970s; it was re-released in 2016 with two additional tracks arranged by Jean-Claude Vannier (who famously worked on Histoire de Melody Nelson) and a booklet featuring notes by Mishka Assayas and texts by Fernando Arrabal.

A recurrent theme in Houellebecq's novels is the intrusion of free-market economics into human relationships and sexuality. The original French title of Whatever, Extension du domaine de la lutte (literally "broadening of the field of struggle"), alludes to economic competition extending into the search for relationships. As the book says, a free market has absolute winners and absolute losers, and the same applies to relationships in a society that does not value monogamy but rather exhorts people to seek the happiness that always eludes them through the path of sexual consumerism, in pursuit of narcissistic satisfaction. Similarly, Platform carries to its logical conclusion the touristic phenomenon, where Westerners of both sexes go on organized trips to developing countries in search of exotic locations and climates. In the novel, a similar popular demand arises for sex tourism, organized and sold in a corporate and professional fashion. Sex tourists are willing to sacrifice financially to experience the instinctual expression of sexuality, which has been better preserved in poor countries whose people are focused on the struggle for survival.

His novel La Carte et le Territoire (The Map and the Territory) was released in September 2010 and finally won its author the prestigious Prix Goncourt. This is the tale of an accidental art star and is full of insights into the contemporary art scene. Slate magazine accused him of plagiarising some passages of this book from French Wikipedia. Houellebecq denied the accusation of plagiarism, stating that "taking passages word for word was not stealing so long as the motives were to recycle them for artistic purposes," evoking the influence of Georges Perec, Lautreamont or Jorge Luis Borges, and advocated the use of all sorts of raw materials in literature, including advertising, recipes or mathematics problems.

On 7 January 2015, the date of the Charlie Hebdo shooting, the novel Submission was published. The book describes a future situation in France, set in 2022, when a Muslim party, following a victory against the National Front, is ruling the country according to Islamic law, which again generated heated controversy and accusations of Islamophobia. On the same date, a cartoon of Houellebecq appeared on the cover page of Charlie Hebdo with the caption "The Predictions of Wizard Houellebecq," eerily ironic in retrospect. For the second time, his fictional work appeared to echo real events involving Islamic terrorism, although Submission does not feature acts of terrorism and eventually presents conversion to Islam as an attractive choice for the protagonist, a typically "houellebecquian" middle-aged man with a fixation for young women. A friend of his, Bernard Maris, was killed in that shooting. In an interview with Antoine de Caunes after the shooting, Houellebecq stated he was unwell and had cancelled the promotional tour for Submission.

In January 2019, Houellebecq was made a Chevalier of the Légion d'honneur. His novel Sérotonine was published (translated as Serotonin) in the same month. This time, one of the novel's main themes, a violent revolt from desperate farmers, appeared to echo the Yellow Vests movement.

== Personal life ==
In 1980, age 24, Houellebecq married for the first time and had a son; he divorced, and became depressed.

In 1998 he married his second wife, Marie-Pierre Gauthier. They divorced in 2010.

His third marriage was in September 2018 to Qianyun Lysis Li, a Chinese woman 34 years his junior, and a student of his works.

== Adaptations ==
Extension du domaine de la lutte has been adapted into a film with the same title by Philippe Harel, and later adapted as a play in Danish by Jens Albinus for the Royal Danish Theatre.

The English translation of his novel Platform was adapted as a play by the theatre company Carnal Acts for the Institute of Contemporary Arts (ICA) in London in December 2004. A Spanish adaptation of the novel by Calixto Bieito, performed by Companyia Teatre Romea, premiered at the 2006 Edinburgh International Festival. Houellebecq and Bieito appeared together that same year in a TV program named Au cœur de la nuit / Durch die Nacht (Through the night) for the French-German channel Arte.

Along with Loo Hui Phang, Houellebecq wrote the screenplay for the film Monde extérieur (2002) by David Rault and David Warren.

Atomised has been made into a German film, Elementarteilchen, directed by Oskar Roehler, starring Moritz Bleibtreu and Franka Potente. The film premiered in 2006 at the 56th Berlin International Film Festival. It was poorly received and generally considered a watered-down take on the novel's bleakness and thought-provoking ideas.

The film La Possibilité d'une île, directed by Houellebecq himself and based on his novel, premiered in France on 10 September 2008. It was a critical and commercial failure, sometimes even considered one of the worst films ever made in France, alongside Bernard Henri Levy's Le Jour et la Nuit, although some authors found him intriguing and recognized redeeming qualities.

American rock singer and "godfather of punk" Iggy Pop released in 2009 the unusually quiet album Préliminaires, which he described as influenced by his reading of Michel Houellebecq's novel The Possibility of an Island (one track 'A Machine for Loving' even consists of the singer merely reading a passage from the book over a musical accompaniment). The author considered it a great honour, as he was himself deeply affected as a teenager by Iggy Pop's music with The Stooges, even going so far as to say that he was, for once, "completely happy".

In 2016 he participated, together with Iggy Pop and several others, in Erik Lieshout's documentary To Stay Alive: A Method, based on his 1991 essay.

== Views on politics and religion ==
In 2002, during an interview about his book Platform published in the literary magazine Lire, Houellebecq remarked:

Islam is a dangerous religion, and has been from the moment it appeared. Fortunately, it is doomed. On one hand, because God does not exist, and even if someone is an idiot, he will eventually realize that. In the long run, the truth will triumph. On the other hand, Islam is undermined from the inside by capitalism. We can only hope that it will triumph rapidly. Materialism is a lesser evil. Its values are contemptible, but nevertheless less destructive, less cruel than those of Islam.

He faced trial on charges of racial hatred after calling Islam "the dumbest religion" ("la religion la plus con") in the same 2002 interview. He told a court in Paris that his words had been twisted, saying: "I have never displayed the least contempt for Muslims [but] I have as much contempt as ever for Islam." The court acquitted him. He was sued by a civil-rights group for hate speech and won on the grounds of freedom of expression. Houellebecq extended his critique to monotheistic religions in general: "The fundamental monotheistic texts preach neither peace nor love nor tolerance. From the start, they were texts of hatred." In what he has said will be his last novel, Anéantir, Houellebecq has seemingly softened his view on Christianity, though by no means seems to be a convert.

In 2014, Houellebecq drew up a "project for a new constitution" based on direct democracy which would render the president of the republic elected for life, but instantly revocable by a simple popular referendum, and would permit the people to elect judges. During his 21 June 2016 appearance on Le Petit Journal, Houellebecq said that he voted for the Socialist Party ticket headed by Anne Hidalgo and Jérôme Coumet in the 2014 Paris municipal election. In 2017, Houellebecq explained that he "doesn't believe in an ideological vote, but a vote based on class" and that "there is a class which votes for Le Pen, a class which votes for Mélenchon, a class which votes for Macron, and a class which votes for Fillon. I am part of the France which votes for Macron, because I am too rich to vote for Le Pen or Mélenchon."

In a 2019 interview, Houellebecq described his views on Catholicism and Europe's need for the Catholic faith.

Houellebecq has been critical of attempts to legalise euthanasia in France and Europe, writing in April 2021 in Le Figaro:

[W]hen a country — a society, a civilisation — gets to the point of legalising euthanasia, it loses in my eyes all right to respect. It becomes henceforth not only legitimate, but desirable, to destroy it; so that something else — another country, another society, another civilisation — might have a chance to arise.

In 2020, conservative American journalist, Christopher Caldwell, defended Houellebecq for his overall depictions of technological loneliness and cultural alienation:

Certain basic things that important novelists do, Houellebecq does not. Great novels usually concern the relationships, institutions, and ideals out of which the "bourgeois" social order is knit together—marriages, schools, jobs, piety, patriotism. But in our time, relationships fail to take root. Institutions fall apart. The visible social order seems not to be the real one. Many novelists limit their vision to those narrow precincts where the world still makes sense (or can be made to make sense) in the way it did to Balzac or Flaubert ... Houellebecq is up to something different. He places his characters in front of specific, vivid, contemporary challenges, often humiliating and often mediated by technology: Internet pornography, genetic research, terrorism, prescription drug addiction. This technological mediation can make his characters seem isolated, and yet it is an isolation with which any contemporary can at least empathize. The Outsider is Everyman. Houellebecq's reputation as a visionary rests on his depiction of what we have instead of the old bourgeois social order.

In an interview with Front Populaire magazine in November 2022, he stated: "The 'Great Replacement' is not a theory, it is a fact. There is no conspiracy orchestrated by the elite but there is a 'transfer' of people from poor countries, where the birth rate is high ... What we can already see is that people are arming themselves. There will be acts of resistance, reverse Bataclans, attacks aimed at mosques as well as cafés popular with Muslims ... The objective of the local French population is not for Muslims to assimilate, but for them to stop robbing and attacking them or another possibility, that they go away." He also blamed the US for importing "woke" culture into France. He went on to add: "Our only chance of survival would be for white supremacy to become trendy in the United States."

Although Houellebecq's work is often credited with building on conservative ideas, his critical depiction of the hippie movement, New Age ideology and the May 1968 generation, especially in Atomised, echoes the thesis of Marxist sociologist Michel Clouscard.

== Literary critical reception ==
Some literary critics have labelled Houellebecq's novels "vulgar", "pamphlet literature" and "pornography"; he has been accused of obscenity, racism, misogyny and Islamophobia.

His works, particularly Atomised, have received high praise from the French literary intelligentsia, with generally positive international critical response, though there have been poor reviews in The New York Times by Michiko Kakutani and Anthony Quinn, in the London Review of Books by Perry Anderson, as well as mixed reviews from The Wall Street Journal. However, without ignoring the book's grotesqueries, Lorin Stein from Salon, later editor of The Paris Review, made a spirited defense:

Houellebecq may despair of love in a free market, but he takes love more seriously, as an artistic problem and a fact about the world, than most polite novelists would dare to do; when he brings his sweeping indignation to bear on one memory, one moment when things seemed about to turn out all right for his characters, and didn't, his compassion can blow you away.

In 2010, Houellebecq responded to critical reviews:

First of all, they hate me more than I hate them. What I do reproach them for isn't bad reviews. It is that they talk about things having nothing to do with my books—my mother or my tax exile—and that they caricature me so that I've become a symbol of so many unpleasant things—cynicism, nihilism, misogyny. People have stopped reading my books because they've already got their idea about me. To some degree of course, that's true for everyone. After two or three novels, a writer can't expect to be read. The critics have made up their minds.

According to the Austrian feature-writer Anne-Catherine Simon in 2016, Houellebecq's oeuvre shows "great continuity: as a long story of western decadence".

In a 2020 interview with Agathe Novak-Lechevalier, Houellebecq characterised himself as "the author of a nihilistic era and the suffering that goes along with nihilism".

In 2018, Lovecraft scholar S. T. Joshi has criticised Houellebecq's stance on Lovecraft. An essay by Todd Spaulding makes the case for why Houellebecq portrayed Lovecraft as an "obsolete reactionary", whose work was based largely on "racial hatred."

Houellebecq's novels have been classified as satire since 2015.

== Legal issues ==
In 2022, Houellebecq participated in an experimental erotic film titled KIRAC 27, produced by the Dutch art collective Keeping It Real Art Critics (KIRAC). The project involved Houellebecq engaging in explicit scenes with multiple women, with the stipulation that his genitals would not appear in the same shot as his face. However, upon viewing the film's trailer, Houellebecq sought to halt its release, alleging an invasion of privacy and labeling the project defamatory. Houellebecq sued to prevent the film's distribution, but was ultimately unsuccessful.

In 2026, it was announced that an actress had filed a complaint the previous year against Houellebecq, his co-star Gérard Depardieu, and director Guillaume Nicloux for incidents she said had occurred on the set of the 2019 film Thalasso. She alleged that she had been sexually assaulted by Houellebecq, and then raped by both him and Depardieu, while Nicloux filmed. The Paris prosecutor's office has confirmed that a judicial investigation has been opened.

== Selected publications ==
- H. P. Lovecraft: Against the World, Against Life (1991, monograph, French: H. P. Lovecraft : Contre le monde, contre la vie)
- Whatever (1994, novel, French: Extension du domaine de la lutte)
- The Art of Struggle (1996, poems, French: Le Sens du combat)
- Atomised (1998, novel, French: Les Particules élémentaires)
- Interventions (1998, collection of various texts, expanded in 2009 and 2020)
- Lanzarote (2000, novella)
- Platform (2001, novel, French: Plateforme)
- The Possibility of an Island (2005, novel, French: La Possibilité d'une île)
- The Map and the Territory (2010, novel, French: La Carte et le Territoire)
- Submission (2015, novel, French: Soumission)
- In the Presence of Schopenhauer (2017, monograph, French: En présence de Schopenhauer)
- Serotonin (2019, novel, French: Sérotonine)
- Annihilation (2022, novel, French: Anéantir)

== Filmography ==
- Cristal de souffrance (1978), short film (author)
- Déséquilibre (1982), short film (author)
- La Rivière (2001), short film for Canal + (author)
- La Possibilité d'une île (2008) (screenwriter/director)
- The Kidnapping of Michel Houellebecq (2014) (actor)
- Near Death Experience (2014) (actor)
- Saint-Amour (2016) (actor)
- To Stay Alive: A Method (2016) (actor)
- Thalasso (2019) (actor)
- Rumba la vie (2022) (actor)
- Being Blanche Houellebecq (2024) (actor)

== Audio albums ==
- Le Sens du combat (1996) Paris: Les Poétiques de France Culture.
- Présence humaine (2000) Paris: Tricatel.
- Établissement d'un ciel d'alternance (2007) Paris: Grrr.
