= Submission (novel) =

2015 novel by Michel Houellebecq

- First edition cover
- Author: Michel Houellebecq
- Original title: Soumission
- Translator: Lorin Stein
- Language: French
- Publisher: Flammarion (France)
- Publication date: 7 January 2015
- Publication place: France
- English publication date: 10 September 2015
- Media type: Print
- Pages: 320
- ISBN: 978-2-08-135480-7

Submission (French: Soumission) is a novel by French writer Michel Houellebecq. The French edition of the book was published on 7 January 2015 by Flammarion, with German (Unterwerfung) and Italian (Sottomissione) translations also published in January. The book instantly became a bestseller in France, Germany and Italy. The English edition of the book, translated by Lorin Stein, was published on 10 September 2015.

The novel imagines a situation in which a Muslim party upholding Islamist and patriarchal values is able to win the 2022 French presidential election with the support of the Socialist Party. The book drew an unusual amount of attention because, by coincidence, it was released on the day of the Charlie Hebdo shooting. The novel mixes fiction with real people: Marine Le Pen, François Hollande, François Bayrou, Manuel Valls, and Jean-François Copé, among others, fleetingly appear as characters in the book.

== Plot ==
The novel's narrator is François, a middle-aged literature professor at Paris 3 and specialist in Huysmans. In 2022 François feels he is at the end of his sentimental and sexual life – composed largely of year-long liaisons with his students. It has been years since he did any valuable university work. France is in the grip of political crisis – in order to stave off a National Front victory, the Socialists ally with the newly formed Muslim Brotherhood Party, with additional support from the Union for a Popular Movement, formerly the main right-wing party. They propose the charming Islamic candidate Mohammed Ben-Abbes for the presidency against the National Front leader Marine Le Pen. In despair at the emerging political situation, and the inevitability of antisemitism becoming a major force in French politics, the parents of François's young and attractive Jewish girlfriend, Myriam, emigrate to Israel, taking her along with them. His mother and father die. He fears that he is heading towards suicide, and takes refuge at an abbey situated in the town of Ligugé; it is also where his literary hero, Huysmans, became a lay member.

Ben-Abbes wins the election, and becomes President of France. He pacifies the country and enacts sweeping changes to French laws, privatizing the Sorbonne, thereby making François redundant with full pension as only Muslims are now allowed to teach there. He also ends gender equality, allowing polygamy. Several of François's intellectually-inferior colleagues, having converted to Islam, get good jobs and make arranged marriages with attractive young wives. The new president campaigns to enlarge the European Union to include North Africa, the Muslim Levant and Turkey, with the aim of making it a new Roman Empire with the now-Islamicized France at its lead. In this new, different society, with the support of the powerful politician Robert Rediger, the novel ends with François poised to convert to Islam and the prospect of a second, better life, with a prestigious job, and wives chosen for him.

== Primary characters ==
François: A 44 year-old French literature professor at Paris 3 and expert on the writer Joris-Karl Huysmans, François is the novel's protagonist and narrator. Professionally exhausted and ideologically uncertain, he spends his time having affairs with his students and watching television. Later, when the Muslim Brotherhood takes over and he is at risk of losing his job, François readies to convert to Islam.

Myriam: Myriam is François' student and lover and she appears to genuinely love him despite difficulties in their relationship caused by his apathy and hopelessness. Amid the rising antisemitism that accompanies the Muslim Brotherhood Party's rise to power, Myriam and her parents move to Israel, leaving François even more forlorn.

Marie-Françoise Tanneur: Also a professor of French literature at Paris 3, Marie-Françoise is François' friend and confidante. She is kept abreast of the tumultuous political events that occur throughout the novel by her husband, Alain, who is a senior officer in the French secret service (DGSI).

Alain Tanneur: Husband of Marie-Françoise, Alain is a senior member of the French internal secret service and thus able to provide his wife and François with information about the events unfolding in the novel.

Steve: Steve is a sub-par professor of literature at Paris 3, rumoured to have gotten or at least kept his job by performing sexual favours for the head of the academic department. Though François doesn't like him, they commiserate together over the political turmoil they witness. Steve is one of the first of the university faculty to convert to Islam, and despite being a mediocre academic he receives a pay raise, as well as a young bride.

Godefroy Lempereur: Another academic colleague of François, Lempereur is affiliated with the right-wing movements opposed to the Islamic takeover though it is unclear to what extent he is involved with them. Young and wealthy, he helps François understand the shifts that are happening in France as portrayed in the novel.

Mohammed Ben-Abbes: Though François never meets him in the book, Ben-Abbes is the moderate and cunning political head of the fictional Muslim Brotherhood Party that eventually takes control of France.

Robert Rediger: A respected professor of literature who has become a convert to and apologist for Islam, Rediger is later appointed Minister of Education and rector of the newly-named Islamic University of Paris-Sorbonne, where he seeks to enlist François in the new regime through a mixture of religious arguments and material inducements.

== Publication ==
On 5 January 2015, French president François Hollande announced in an interview for France Inter radio that he "would read the book, because it's sparking a debate." The author appeared in a caricature on the front page of the satirical magazine Charlie Hebdo on 7 January 2015, the day when the offices of the newspaper were attacked by masked gunmen who killed eight Charlie Hebdo employees. The title on the cover was: "Les prédictions du mage Houellebecq : en 2015, je perds mes dents, en 2022, je fais ramadan." (English: "The predictions of the sorcerer Houellebecq: In 2015, I lose my teeth. In 2022, I observe Ramadan.")

On the day of the publishing of the book and hours before the attack on Charlie Hebdo, Houellebecq said in an interview for France Inter radio:

There's a real disdain in this country for all the authorities. ... You can feel that this can't continue. Something has to change. I don't know what, but something.

The Italian language translation (Sottomissione) by Vincenzo Vega was published on 15 January 2015 by Bompiani. The German translation (Unterwerfung) by Norma Cassau and Bernd Wilczek was published on 16 January 2015 by DuMont Buchverlag. Lorin Stein translated the book into English. The Spanish language translation (Sumisión) by Joan Riambau was published 29 April 2015 by Anagrama.

== Reception ==
The book was an instant bestseller. More than 120,000 books were sold in the weeks following publication. One month later, 345,000 copies had been sold in France alone, and the book was a best seller in Italy and Germany.

Several critics, including Bruno de Cessole of Valeurs actuelles and Jérôme Dupuis of L'Express, compared the novel to Jean Raspail's 1973 novel The Camp of the Saints, a novel about the political impotence of Europe during a massive wave of immigration from India. Grégoire Leménager of L'Obs downplayed the similarities to The Camp of the Saints, as Submission does not deal with ethnicity, and instead placed Houellebecq's novel within a trend of recent French novels about immigration and Islam, together with La Mémoire de Clara by Patrick Besson, Dawa by Julien Suaudeau and Les Événements by Jean Rolin, speculating that the concept of the "Great Replacement" ("Grand Remplacement"), as formulated by Renaud Camus, was becoming fashionable as a literary device. The book has also been seen as inspired by Bat Ye'or's Eurabia thesis.

Mark Lilla, in The New York Review of Books, stated similarly that "Europe in 2022 has to find another way to escape the present, and 'Islam' just happens to be the name of the next clone." French novelist Emmanuel Carrère compared Submission to George Orwell's 1984.

== Controversy ==
Houellebecq had commented on his own novel in an interview with The Paris Review 5 days ahead of publication:

… I can't say that the book is a provocation — if that means saying things I consider fundamentally untrue just to get on people's nerves. I condense an evolution that is, in my opinion, realistic.

In advance of the novel's publication, French Prime Minister Manuel Valls declared, "France is not Michel Houellebecq . . . it's not intolerance, hatred, fear." The book generated instant controversy and criticism from the French Left for its portrayal of Islam calling it islamophobic. Lydia Kiesling, writing for Slate, stated, "There is a way in which Submission is not, strictly speaking, Islamophobic. But it does Aylan Kurdi no favors." The New York Times likewise argued Submission "plays on French fears of terrorism, immigration and changing demographics."

Rob Doyle of The Irish Times found the themes of the book favourable to Islam, stating Houellebecq "suggests that yielding to the rule of Islam, with its reassuring social and sexual hierarchies, might be a good option for an otherwise terminal Europe." Steven Poole, writing for The Guardian, noted that the book was "arguably, not primarily about politics at all. The real target of Houellebecq's satire — as in his previous novels — is the predictably manipulable venality and lustfulness of the modern metropolitan man, intellectual or otherwise." Adam Shatz, writing for the London Review of Books, stated that it "is the work of a nihilist not a hater – the jeu d’esprit of a man without convictions".

Three critics also suggested the novel promoted misogynistic views. Erik Martiny's review in The London Magazine highlighted that "gender hierarchy is presented in the novel as the essential backbone to a healthy, stable society." Heller McAlpin's review for the NPR concluded with the line, "I'm hoping that women, at least, won't take this insulting scenario lying down," while Lydia Kiesling contextualized the book's depiction of women by stating Submission contains an "Evo-Psych 101 correlation of women's worth with their sexual viability" prevalent in both Houellebecq's work and his personal comments.

== Adaptations ==
A monologue stage performance with Edgar Selge as François toured Germany in early 2016 with dates in Hamburg, Dresden and Berlin. According to Die Zeit, interest in the story was piqued by the New Year's Eve sexual assaults in Germany. A German film adaptation, based both on the novel and the stage performance, was produced by the television channel Rundfunk Berlin-Brandenburg as Unterwerfung. The film stars Selge who reprises his role from the stage version. The film premiered on German public broadcaster ARD on 6 June 2018, followed by a roundtable, which resulted in "a broad internet discussion," in calls for all German political talkshows to be suspended for one year, and in an apology from ARD presenter Sandra Maischberger.

== Editions and translations ==
- Soumission, French, Flammarion, 7 January 2015
- Sottomissione, Italian translation, Bompiani, 15 January 2015 (Translator: V. Vega)
- Unterwerfung, German translation, Dumont Buchverlag, 16 January 2015 (Translators: Norma Cassau and Bernd Wilczek)
- Behódolás, Hungarian translation, Magvető, 22 April 2015 (Translator: Ágnes Tótfalusi)
- Submissió, Catalan translation, Anagrama, 29 April 2015 (Translator: Oriol Sánchez Vaqué)
- Sumisión, Spanish translation, Anagrama, 29 April 2015 (Translator: Joan Riambau)
- Onderworpen, Dutch translation, Arbeiderspers, May 2015 (Translator: Martin de Haan)
- Supunere, Romanian translation, Humanitas, May 2015 (Translator: Daniel Nicolescu)
- Pokoravanje, Serbo-Croat translation, Buybook, May 2015 (Translator: Vladimir Janković)
- כניעה, Hebrew translation, babel, May 2015 (Translator: Amit Rotbard)
- 복종, Korean translation, Munhakdongne, 17 July 2015 (Translator: 장소미)
- Uległość, Polish translation, W.A.B., 9 September 2015 (Translator: Beata Geppert)
- Submission, English translation, William Heinemann, 10 September 2015 (Translator: Lorin Stein)
- Fukujū, Japanese translation, Kadokawa shinsho, 11 September 2015 (Translator: Ōtsuka Momo)
- Underkastelse, Swedish translation, Albert Bonniers, October 2015 (Translator: Kristoffer Leandoer)
- Podvolení, Czech translation, Odeon, October 2015 (Translator: Alan Beguivin)
- Underkastelse, Danish translation, Rosinante, 1 October 2015 (Translator: Niels Lyngsø)
- Alistuminen, Finnish translation, WSOY, 21 October 2015 (Translator: Lotta Toivanen)
- Submissão, Brazilian Portuguese translation, Objetiva, December 2015 (Translator: Rosa Freire d'Aguiar)
- Underkastelse, Norwegian translation, Cappelen Damm, February 2016 (Translator: Tom Lotherington)
- Undirgefni, Icelandic translation, Mál og Menning, February 2016 (Translator: Friðrik Rafnsson)
- Pakļaušanās, Latvian translation, Jāņa Rozes apgāds, June 2016 (Translator: Dens Dimiņš)
- Pasidavimas, Lithuanian translation, Kitos knygos, 5 November 2015 (Translator: Goda Bulybenko)
- Alistumine, Estonian translation, Varrak, 21 November 2016 (Translator: Triinu Tamm)
- Podreditev, Slovenian translation, Cankarjeva založba, December 2016 (Translator: Mojca Medvešek)
- Подчинение, Bulgarian translation, Fakel Express, 2015 (Translator: Alexandra Veleva)
- Покорность, Russian translation, Corpus, 2016 (Translator: Marija Zonina)
- Покора, Ukrainian translation, Klub Simeinoho Dozvillia, 2015 (Translator: Ivan Riabchyi)
- Հնազանդություն, Armenian translation, Antares, 2017 (Translator: Ruzan Murzoyan)
- İtaat, Turkish translation, İthaki, 2011 (Translator: Başak Öztürk)

== See also ==
- The Mosque of Notre Dame (2005) by Elena Chudinova
