= Ivan Riabchyi =

Ukrainian translator and journalist (born 1978)

- Іван Рябчій
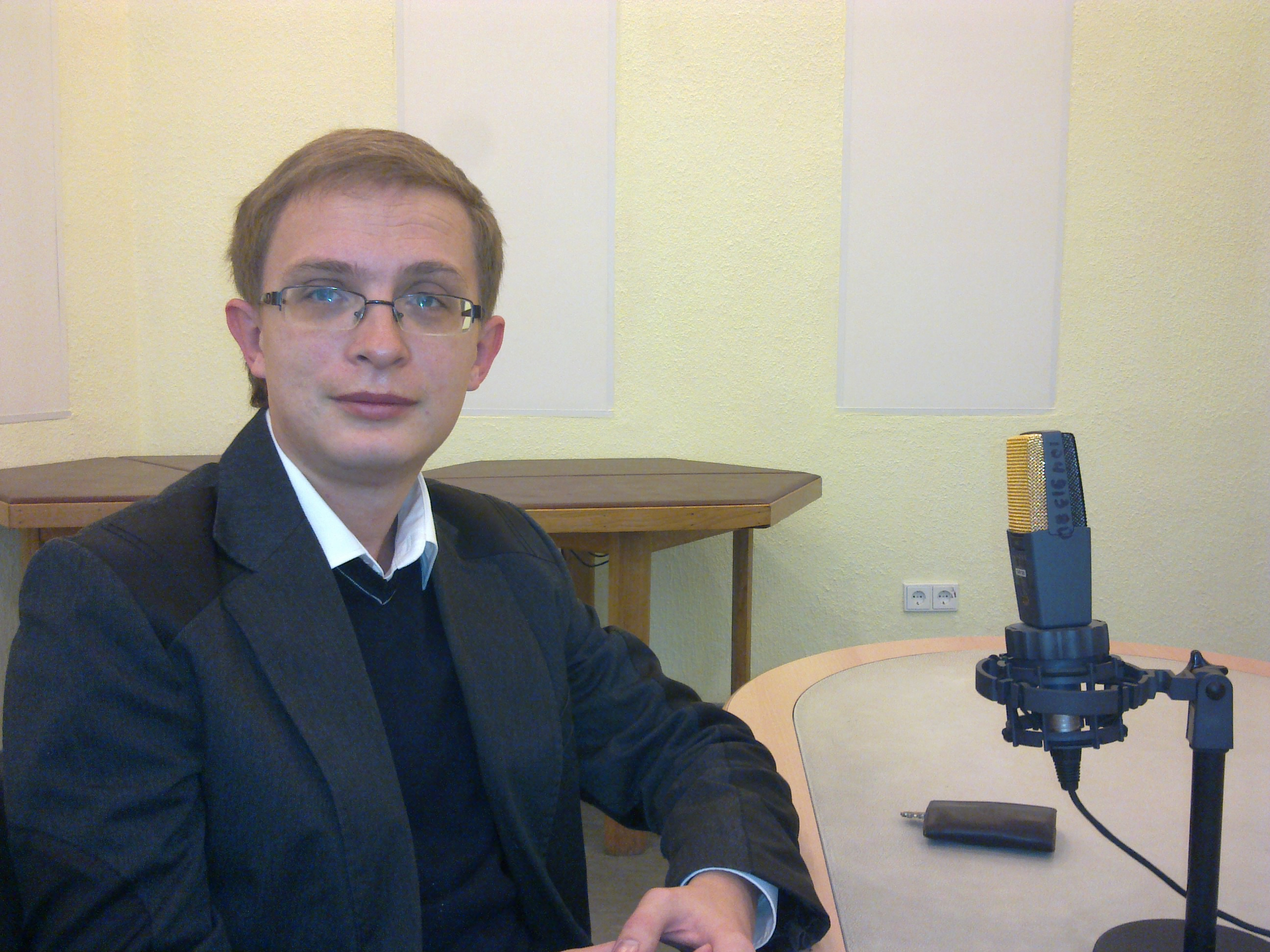
- Born: Ivan Serhiiovych Riabchyi; 9 August 1978 (age 48); Dniprodzerzhynsk, Dnipropetrovsk Oblast, Ukrainian SSR, Soviet Union
- Citizenship: Soviet Union (–1991); Ukraine (1991–present)
- Education: Oles Honchar Dnipro National University
- Occupations: Translator, publisher, journalist, scholar (PhD)

Ivan Serhiiovych Riabchyi (Note: Also Ryabtchiy, Riabtchii, Riabchii or Riabtchiï.) (Ukrainian: Іва́н Сергі́йович Рябчі́й, pronounced [iˈwɑn serˈɦijowɪtʃ rʲɐbˈtʃij]; born 9 August 1978) is a Ukrainian translator, journalist, publisher, scholar (PhD), and cultural manager. He is one of the leading francophone translators in Ukraine who writes in Ukrainian, Russian and French. Head of the Representative Office of the Ukrainian Institute in France (2023-2024).

== Biography ==
=== Education ===
Ivan Riabchyi studied French language and literature at the Faculty of Philology of Foreign Countries of the Oles Honchar Dnipro National University from 1995 to 2000. During his graduate, he deepened his field of study in the speciality Foreign literature (2000–2003) and Journalism (2004–2007). His Thesis Director was philosopher and writer Volodymyr Selivanov-Buryak. In May 2026, he earned the degree of Doctor of Philosophy (PhD) at the National Pedagogical Drahomanov University, having successfully defended his dissertation within the UNESCO Chair on Science Education.

=== Career ===
Since receiving his PhD degree, Riabchyi taught French and English at the Oles Honchar Dnipro National University. In 2006, he started his journalistic activity in Book-club+ (Knyzhkovyi klub Plus) literary and artistic magazine and Annals 2000 (Khronika 2000) yearly periodical in Kyiv.

Freelancing for several print and electronic media, he writes for Defense Express website and magazine of the non-governmental organization "Center for Army, Conversion and Disarmament Studies" (CACDS) and for The Editor-in-Chief (Glavred) news magazine from 2007 to 2009.

In 2008, he was an assistant director of the Ukrainian Writer (Ukrayins’kyi pys’mennyk) publishing house, owned by the National Writers' Union of Ukraine.

His activity domains permanently alternate since then, thus Riabchyi works in management, education, mass media and literature. In the last one, he won the Ukrainian-German Oles Honchar Prize 2010 for his short novel Macabre. In collaboration with Dmytro Tchystyak, Riabchyi translated into French poems of Ukrainian author Olexiï Dovgii (Oleksiy Dovgy) and this collection Le Calice de roses was published by Éditions L'Harmattan in Paris.

He occasionally writes for the Mirror Weekly (Dzerkalo Tyzhnia) and, from 2010, he is an assistant of the president of the Minor Academy of Sciences of Ukraine.

Beside the writing, Riabchyi worked as an editor and host on the Ukrainian Radio in 2008–2012. His own show Bookish Flash (Knyzhkovyi spalah) was a winner of the national competition of the State Committee for Television and Radio-broadcasting "for the coverage of literary life" in 2011.

In 2012, he became a member of the European Association of Journalists (Bruxelles) and of the PEN International Belgian (French-speaking) Centre.

Riabchyi's book of three short stories "Lilith" was published in French by Éditions Institut culturel de Solenzara in Paris in 2013.

During the years 2015 and 2016 he was a head of Kyiv office of Folio publishing house based in Kharkiv.

At the same time, Riabchyi presents several French-speaking authors to Ukrainian readership, practising the written translation since his university studies, and for achievements in this domain he received Skovoroda Prize from the Embassy of the French Republic in Ukraine in 2016, 2017 and 2020. He also won the Maksym Rylsky Prize 2016 and the Ars Translationis Prize in memory of Mykola Lukash 2019. He has translated authors such as Michel Houellebecq, Georges Eekhoud, Georges Charpak, Eric-Emmanuel Schmitt, Yasmina Reza, Philippe Delorme, Gérard de Cortanze, Jocelyne Saucier, Didier van Cauwelaert, Caroline Lamarche, Patrick Modiano, Nancy Huston, Frédéric Pajak, Hervé Guibert, Georges Bataille, Jeton Kelmendi, Anatole France, Hergé, Henry Bauchau, Charles van Lerberghe, Jacques De Decker, Honoré de Balzac and numerous others. Several of his translations were published in Vsesvit literary magazine.

His book "Twice Ten: Faces and Voices" (Ukrainian: Двічі по десять: обличчя і голоси ISBN 9786177192373), composed of twenty interviews with literary and scientific figures, was released in 2015 by the Anetta Antonenko Publishers. Among the interlocutors in this book are Amélie Nothomb, Jean-Luc Outers, Éric-Emmanuel Schmitt, Sylviane Dupuis, Nicole Lemaire d'Agaggio, Jacques du Decker, Irène Stecyk, Huguette de Brocqueville, Valeriy Shevchuk, Polina Horodyska, Volodymyr Selivanov-Buryak, Vitaly Chernetsky, Oleksiy Dovgy, Vyacheslav Medvid, Lyubov Holota, Olena Herasymyuk, Lyubko Deresh and Dmytro Tchystyak.

Becoming executive director of the Anne de Kyiv Fest International Art Festival in 2015, Riabchyi is also a head of the Pinzel Publishing House (PNZL) from 2016.

His theatrical translations are embodied on Ukrainian stages: "Massacre" (Riznya), Yasmina Reza's "God of Carnage" adaptation, directed by Vlada Byelozorenko, at the Kyiv Academic Young Theater (2016); "Sentimental Tectonics" based on the play by Éric-Emmanuel Schmitt, directed by Taras Kryvoruchenko on the same stage (2019); "The Chopin's Secret", an adaptation of another Schmitt's play, directed by Oleksiy Kujelny at the Suzirya (Constellation) Academic Workshop of Theatrical Art (2020); "Bella Figura" based on the Yasmina Reza's play, directed by Hennady Fortus, at Zaporizhzhia Youth Theater (2021).

He was a literary coordinator of the "Parasol" social art project dedicated to palliative care issues in 2017.

Riabchyi is Eric-Emmanuel Schmitt's theatrical agent in Ukraine since 2018.

In 2021, he began to serve as a head of the Office of Copyright and Neighbouring Rights, Presentation and Distribution of Audiovisual Works in the Culture Department in the Kyiv City State Administration. He also has a membership in the Public Council of the Shevchenkivskyi District State Administration in Kyiv since the same year.

From 2023 to 2024, he served as Head of the Representative Office of the Ukrainian Institute in France. He subsequently worked as an Individual Consultant for UNESCO, first with the Social and Human Sciences Sector (2024–2025) and then with the Natural Sciences Sector (2025–2026).

In 2023 Riabchyi was admitted to the National Writers' Union of Ukraine.

=== Ivan Tusso ===
Under the pseudonym Ivan Tusso, he wrote a number of scandalous articles for Gordon's Boulevard (Bulvar Gordona) newspaper, for The Editor-in-Chief (Glavred) and other media. Riabchyi also created short stories for One of us (Odyn z nas) gay magazine under that pen-name.

=== Political views ===
In May 2014, after the Russo-Ukrainian War started, he has commented the plebiscite situation in the east of Ukraine for Le Parisien:

This referendum isn't legitimate. Donetsk and Luhansk are undoubtedly part of the Ukrainian state, and the authorities in power has not decreed this "referendum". Who organizes it? People who have proclaimed themselves "government" but who have no support from the population. The Ukrainians of Donetsk and Luhansk are undoubtedly closer to Kyiv than to Moscow. These lands have always been in the Ukrainian cultural and ethnic area.

=== Religious position ===
In 2016, Riabchyi has received the St Nicholas the Wonderworker Order of the Ukrainian Orthodox Church — Kyiv Patriarchate for "contribution to the regeneration of spirituality in Ukraine". He has consequently become a target in the Russian-Ukrainian Church War after the participation as an interpreter for Metropolitan Michel Laroche at the Bishops' Council of the Orthodox Church of Ukraine on December 14, 2019. Religious opponents criticized the Ukrainian autocephaly focusing on Riabchyi's "homosexuality" and "LGBT-activism", neither directly confirmed by himself, as a contradiction to his 2016's decoration.

=== Events participant ===
- 2009–2010: Forum of Publishers and Translators of the Commonwealth of Independent States (CIS) and Baltic States (Yerevan, Armenia)
- 2009–2016, 2019: European College of Literary Translators of Seneffe (Belgium)
- 2010–2013, 2015, 2018: Salon du livre de Paris
- 2010: 12th international ECHA (European Council for High Ability) conference, Paris
- 2011: La Novela Knowledge Festival (Toulouse, France)
- 2012: Ukraine Economic Forum (Paris, France)
- 2013: Živa književnost Literary Festival (Ljubljana, Slovenia)
- 2013: Festival of Ukrainian Literature (Innsbruck, Austria)
- 2014: International colloquium "Light at the service of man" of the European Academy of Sciences, Arts and Letters (Cáceres, Spain)
- 2015: BIEF Program of the French Ministry of Culture for foreign publishers (Paris, France)
- 2016: EuroScience International (Toulouse, France)
- 2020: Book on stage (Knyzhka na sceni), one of the translators of the project (Kyiv-Lviv)
- 2021: 3rd Movohray International Competition for young translators by the Association of Ukrainian Teachers Abroad, president of the jury
- 2021: Hryhoriy Kochur Literary Prize, one of the jurors
- 2021: National Fair Più libri più liberi (Rome, Italy)

=== Awards and honours ===
- 2010: Oles Honchar International Prize in the category "Short Story" for the collection of short fiction "Macabre"
- 2011: winner of the National Competition by the State Committee for Television and Radio-broadcasting "for the coverage of literary life"
- 2013: second place in the national expert survey "Development of charity in Ukraine" (Ukrainian: Розвиток благодійності в Україні) in the category "Best publication on charity"
- 2014: Panteleimon Kulish Literary and Artistic Prize (for the short story)
- 2015: special mention from the French Embassy in Ukraine for the translation of Georges Charpak's "Mémoires d’un déraciné, physicien, citoyen du monde" as a part of the Skovoroda Publishing Aid Program
- 2016: Maksym Rylsky Prize
- 2016: Skovoroda Prize from the French Embassy in Ukraine (for the translation of "Deux Messieurs de Bruxelles" by Eric-Emmanuel Schmitt)
- 2017: Skovoroda Prize from the French Embassy in Ukraine (for the translation of "Anne de Kiev : une reine de France venue d’Ukraine" by Philippe Delorme)
- 2018: honourable mention by the Ministry of Culture of Ukraine
- 2019: Ars Translationis Prize in memory of Mykola Lukash
- 2020: Skovoroda Prize by the French Embassy in Ukraine (for the translation of "Les Héritiers de la mine" by Jocelyne Saucier)

== Selected translations in Ukrainian ==
1. Michel Houellebecq, The Possibility of an Island / Можливість острова (Folio publishers, Kharkiv, 2007) ISBN 9789660337787
2. Georges Eekhoud, Escal-Vigor / Замок Ескаль-Віґор (Samit-Knyha Publishing house, Kyiv, 2011) ISBN 9789667889760
3. Henry Bauchau, L'enfant bleu / Блакитний хлопчик (Raduha (Rainbow) Magazine Publishers, Kyiv, 2012) ISBN 9789669791764
4. Eric-Emmanuel Schmitt, Two Gentlemen of Brussels / Двоє добродіїв із Брюсселя (Anetta Antonenko Publishers, Lviv, 2014) ISBN 9786177654390
5. Michel Houellebecq, Submission / Покора (KSD or "Family Leisure Club" Publishing house, Kharkiv, 2015) ISBN 9789661490993 ISBN 9782081354807
6. Yasmina Reza, God of Carnage / Божество різанини (Anetta Antonenko Publishers, Lviv, 2015) ISBN 9786177192281
7. Jocelyne Saucier, And the Birds Rained Down / Дощило птахами (Anetta Antonenko Publishers, Lviv, 2017) ISBN 9786177192595
8. Eric-Emmanuel Schmitt, Concerto in Memory of an Angel / Концерт пам'яті янгола (Anetta Antonenko Publishers, Lviv, 2017) ISBN 9786177192786
9. Patrick Modiano, After the Circus / Цирк іде (Folio publishers, Kharkiv, 2017) ISBN 9789660373181
10. Nancy Huston, The Mark of the Angel / Печатка янгола (Anetta Antonenko Publishers, Lviv, 2018) ISBN 9786177654017
11. Hervé Guibert, To the Friend Who Did Not Save My Life / Другові, який не врятував мені життя (PINZEL Publishing House, Kyiv, 2018) ISBN 9789669764447
12. Hergé, Tintin in the Land of the Soviets / Тентен у країні Сов'єтів (PINZEL Publishing House, Kyiv, 2019) ISBN 9789669791726
13. Jocelyne Saucier, Twenty-One Cardinals / Шахтоємці (Anetta Antonenko Publishers, Lviv, 2020) ISBN 9786177654222
14. Eric-Emmanuel Schmitt, Sentimental Tectonics / Тектоніка почуттів(Anetta Antonenko Publishers, Lviv, 2020) ISBN 9786177654369
15. Georges Bataille, L'Histoire de l'érotisme / Історія еротизму (Anetta Antonenko Publishers, Lviv, 2021) ISBN 9786177654550
16. Hervé Le Tellier, The Anomaly / Аномалія (Nora-Druk Publishers, Kyiv, 2021) ISBN 9789666880812
17. David B., Epileplic / Підхмарне лихо (PINZEL Publishing House, Kyiv, 2021)
18. Nancy Huston, Fault lines / Розколини (Anetta Antonenko Publishers, Lviv, 2021) ISBN 9786177654802
