= History of Violence (novel) =

2016 novel by Édouard Louis

- 2017 French edition (publ. Points)
- Author: Édouard Louis
- Publication date: 2016
- Publication place: France
- Preceded by: The End of Eddy
- Followed by: Who Killed My Father

History of Violence (French: Histoire de la violence) is the second novel by French writer Édouard Louis. It was first published in French by Seuil in January, 2016. In 2020, it was shortlisted for the International Dublin Literary Award.

== Background ==
The novel is based on a real incident that occurred on Christmas Eve, 2012.

== Synopsis ==
Told in first-person narration, the novel presents its events in a nonlinear format. The narrator, Édouard, recounts a sexual encounter in Paris on Christmas Eve. The encounter culminates in a violent rape and robbery. Édouard subsequently reports the crime to the police, which causes him more trauma. On a visit home, he overhears his sister and her husband discussing the further details of the assault.

== Translations ==
History of Violence has been translated into English by Lorin Stein. This translation was published in hardcover by Macmillan in June, 2018, and in the United Kingdom in 2019 by Harvill Secker.

== Reception ==
In his review for The Guardian, Edmund White wrote, "Thanks to translator Lorin Stein it has retained its complexity, its startling physicality and its moral subtlety in English."

Johanna Thomas-Corr of The Times called it "a slim but densely layered novel that begins with raw urgency, but then slows and circles the attack, hovering over it with an unnerving luxury."

== Adaptations ==
=== Stage ===
A stage adaptation of History of Violence premiered in November, 2019, at St. Ann's Warehouse. The German-language production was directed by Thomas Ostermeier; Louis, who was already a big fan of Ostermeier, co-wrote the adaptation with the director and Florian Borchmeyer and was closely involved in the staging of the play. The production starred Laurenz Laufenberg as Édouard, Renato Schuch as Reda, Alina Stiegler as Édouard's sister Clara, and Christoph Gawenda as Clara's husband.

=== Film ===
In February 2023, Deadline Hollywood reported that Christopher Zwickler and Dario Suter optioned the book rights for a German-language film adaptation. The project is collaboration between the German distributor-producer DCM and the Berlin-based producer Flute Film. Dan Kitrosser has adapted the screenplay and Igor Plischke is set to direct.
