= Chudinov =

Chudinov (Russian: Чудинов) is a Russian masculine surname, its feminine counterpart is Chudinova. It may refer to

- Dmitry Chudinov (born 1986), Russian professional boxer
- Elena Chudinova (born 1959), Russian writer, poet, publicist, and playwright
- Fedor Chudinov (born 1987), Russian professional boxer, brother of Dimitry
- Igor Chudinov (born 1961), Prime Minister of Kyrgyzstan
- Maxim Chudinov (born 1990), Russian ice hockey player
- Sergey Chudinov (born 1983), Russian skeleton racer
