= Franziska Walser =

German actress (born 1952)

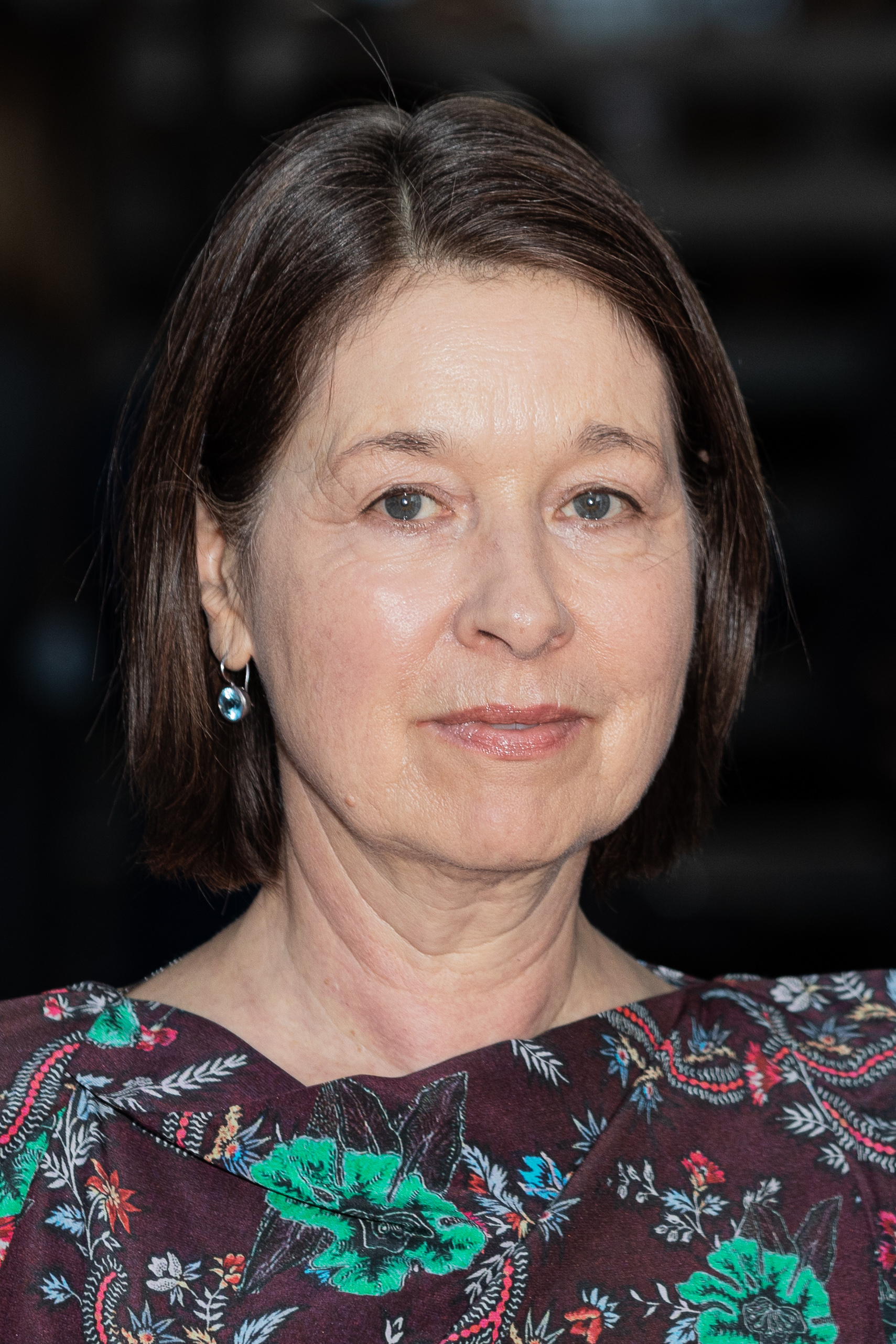
- Franziska Walser, 2019
- Born: 23 March 1952 (age 74); Stuttgart, West Germany
- Occupation: Actress
- Years active: 1976-present

Franziska Walser (born 23 March 1952) is a German actress. She appeared in more than fifty films since 1976. She is the oldest daughter of writer Martin Walser. Walser is married to actor Edgar Selge.

== Selected filmography ==
Year	Title	Role	Notes
1978	Germany in Autumn	Ismene	
1991	Success	Johanna Krain	
2007	Fashion Victims	Erika Zenker	
