= Alfred Lindon =

Polish jeweller (c.1867–1948)

- Born: Abner Lindenbaum c. 1867; Kraków, Grand Duchy of Kraków
- Died: 1948 (aged 80–81)
- Occupations: Jeweller, art collector
- Spouse: Fernande Citroën
- Children: Lucien Lindon; Maxime Lindon; Raymond Lindon; Maurice Lindon; Jacques Lindon
- Parent(s): Moses Lindenbaum; Caroline Weil
- Relatives: André Citroën (brother-in-law); Mathieu Lindon (great-grandson); Vincent Lindon (great-grandson)

Alfred Lindon (born Abner Lindenbaum; c. 1867 – 1948) was a Polish jeweller from a poor Jewish background who became an expert on pearls. He married into the Citroën family and built an important collection of modern art that was looted by the Nazis in occupied Paris during the Second World War. He lived to see some of his paintings returned, although others were returned to his heirs after his death.

== Early life and family ==
Lindon was born Abner Lindenbaum around 1867 at Kraków in the Grand Duchy of Kraków, a territory that is now in Poland but at the time was part of Galicia in the Austro-Hungarian Empire. His father was Moses Lindenbaum, and his mother was Caroline Weil. He married Fernande Citroën (1874–1963), sister of the motor manufacturer André Citroën, and they had five sons – Lucien, Maxime, Raymond, Maurice and Jacques — and a daughter, Sonia. His grandson Jérôme Lindon (1925-2001), Raymond's son, became an important figure in French publishing. His great-grandsons are the journalist and writer Mathieu Lindon, and the actor Vincent Lindon.

== Career ==
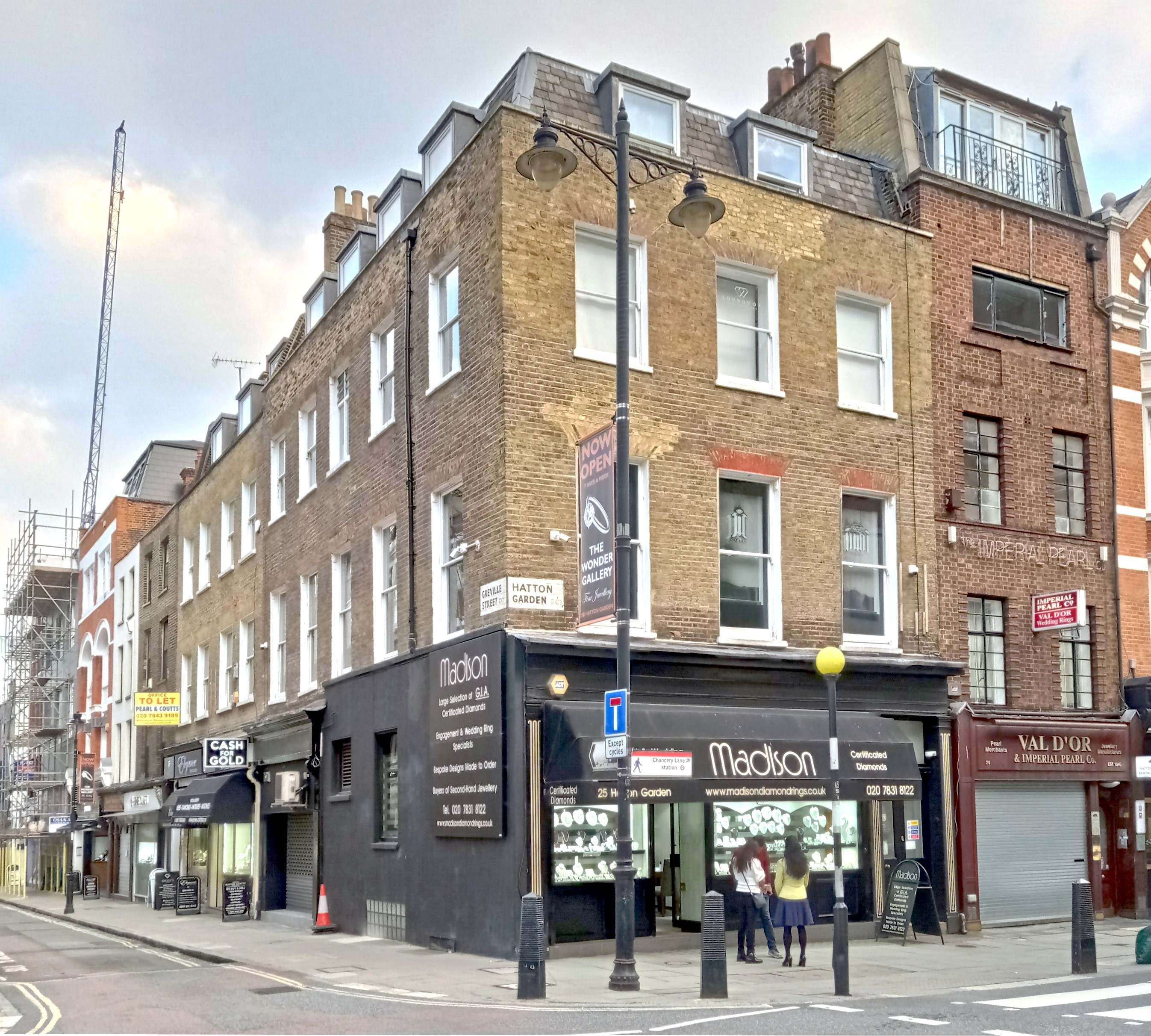
25 Hatton Garden in 2021

Lindenbaum worked in the jewellery business, becoming an expert in pearls. He was in partnership with Adolf Weil and his younger brother, Lewis Lindenbaum, as a diamond merchant at 25 Hatton Garden, London, and 48 rue La Fayette, Paris, where they traded as Lindenbaum and Weil. The firm had been trading since at least the early 1890s. In 1901 it was the buyer of a six-row Napoleonic necklace of pearls for £20,000 at Christie's in London. That partnership was dissolved at the end of 1911. Thereafter, Weil and the Lindenbaums bid separately for expensive pearls in London auctions. In 1916, a Lindenbaum was the under bidder on a pearl necklace at Christie's that sold for £24,000.

Lindenbaum changed his name to Alfred Lindon during the First World War, in 1916, as he thought that name would be more acceptable than a German-sounding name. He also abandoned his Austro-Hungarian nationality. He had been naturalised a British citizen in 1887.

== Life in Paris ==
Provenance records suggest that Lindon began to be a serious buyer of art around the late 1920s or early 1930s. In 2006, his grandson Denis Lindon (Raymond's son) remembered visiting Alfred at his home in Paris (Avenue Foch) when he would have been in his 60s or 70s: "He was a bon vivant, we should call him. He liked his food. He was rather fat because he ate too much. He was also fond of music and he read, but art was really the centre of his life."

But there was another side to Lindon. Denis recalled that his grandfather "was always very anxious—he was very Jewish in that respect. He was worried about the future, always pessimistic". Denis put it down to his background. "He'd had a difficult youth and had the Jewish spirit—he was always thinking that things were going to be difficult. But maybe that saved his life because if he wasn't pessimistic maybe he would've stayed in Paris and ended up in Auschwitz."

== Second World War ==
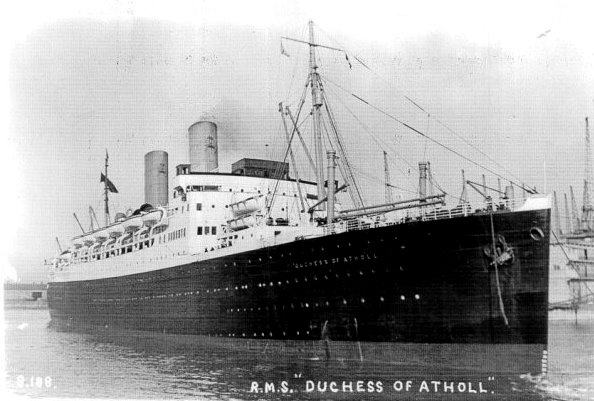
RMS Duchess of Atholl, the ship on which the Lindons made their escape to North America

Lindon and his wife left Paris for London soon after the German invasion of France in 1940. They travelled from Liverpool to Montreal, Canada, on the RMS Duchess of Atholl, departing on 17 August 1940. They eventually arrived in America where they remained for the rest of the Second World War. Before leaving Paris they placed their collection of art in the care of the rue Cambon branch of the Chase Manhattan Bank, possibly because America was not then at war with Germany and they believed that their possessions would be safe in an American bank. The Chase bank was one of the few American banks that continued to trade in France after the German occupation. Presumably unknown to the Lindons, the manager of the Paris branch, Carlos Niedermann, had close links with the Nazi regime.

Soon after the Nazis reached Paris in June 1940, the Devisenschutz-Kommando (Commando for the Protection of Currency), raided the Chase bank looking for currency. They found instead Lindon's paintings which they seized. These were later transferred to the Einsatzstab Reichsleiter Rosenberg (ERR), the chief looting organisation of the regime, whose job was to trawl occupied territory for art and antiques to transport back to Germany for Hitler's planned Führermuseum and the collections of top Nazis such as Hermann Göring.

Among the paintings taken by the Nazis was Édouard Vuillard's Le Salon de Madame Aron (1911–12) an important intimisme work that provides an insight into middle-class life in France in the early 20th century. The painting was not returned to Lindon's heirs until 2006 after the National Gallery of Canada identified it as a work with an incomplete provenance and advertised its existence. Alfred's son, Jacques, an art dealer, twice denied that the painting had belonged to his father before the French authorities released new information from German records taken at the time which proved that the painting had belonged to Alfred. As none of his approximately 15 descendants could afford to buy the others out, the painting was auctioned by Christie's in New York in 2006, selling for $912,000.

Also taken was Claude Monet's La rue Montorgueil, à Paris. Fête du 30 juin 1878, which entered the Göring Collection via the ERR in 1941. It depicts the patriotic scene in rue Montorgueil on the day of a feast that was a precursor to the current Bastille Day. It was recovered in Italy after the war and displayed at a special exhibition at the Galerie Nationale du Jeu de Paume in 1946 of recovered art. It is now in the Musée d'Orsay. Vincent van Gogh's, Flowers in a Vase, also from the Lindon collection, was one of 25 pictures from various sources exchanged by Göring for old master works from Galerie Fischer in 1941.

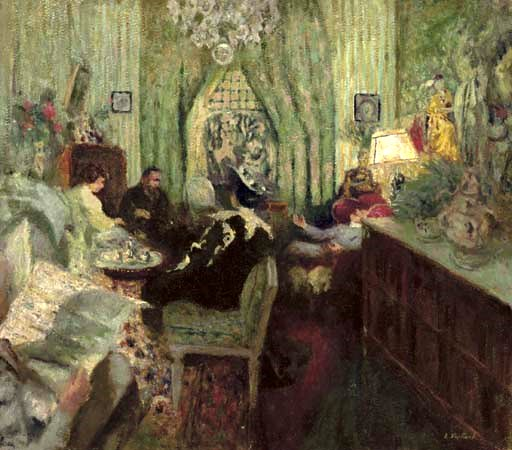
Édouard Vuillard, Le Salon de Madame Aron, 1911–12

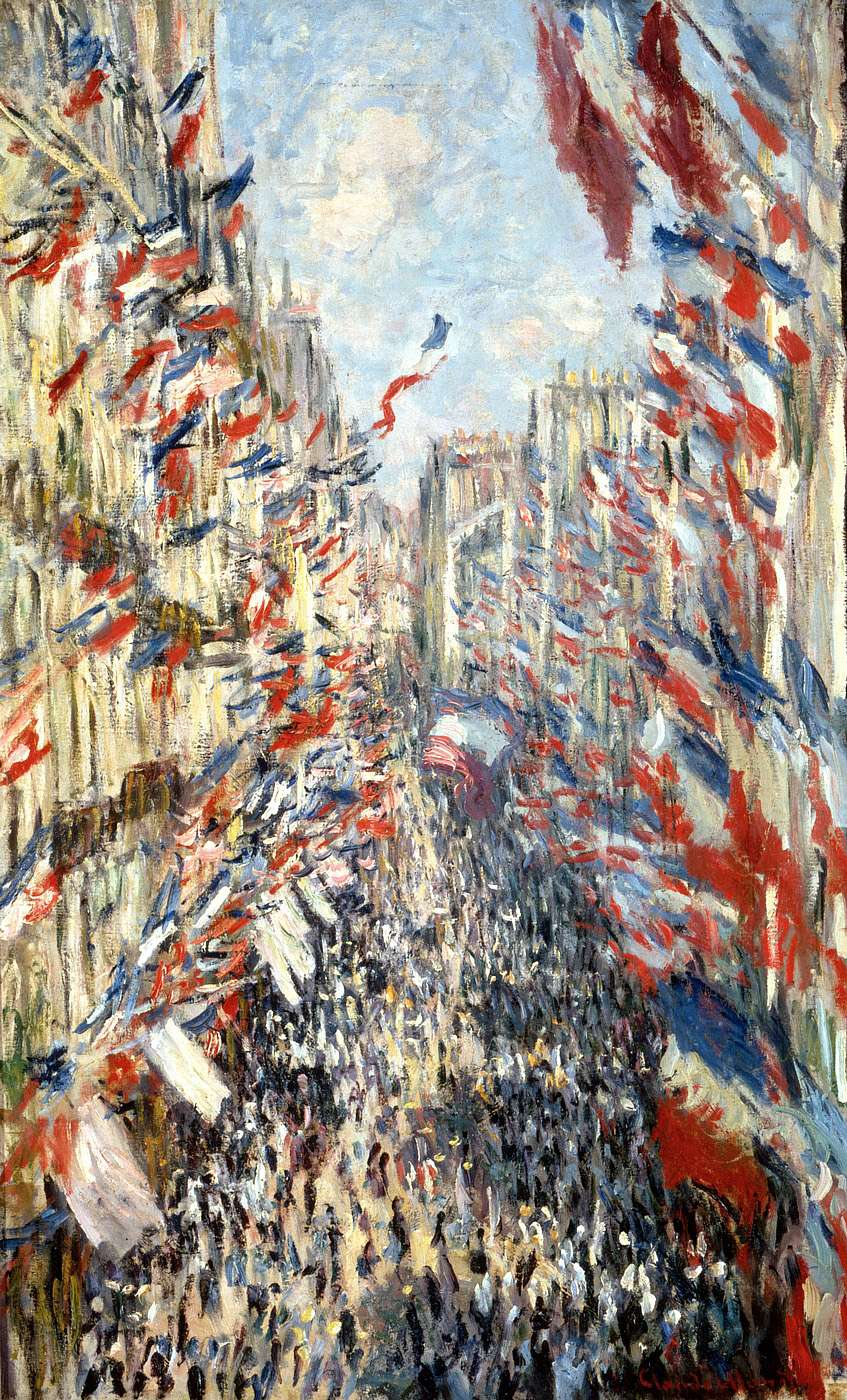
Claude Monet, La rue Montorgueil, à Paris. Fête du 30 juin 1878, 1878

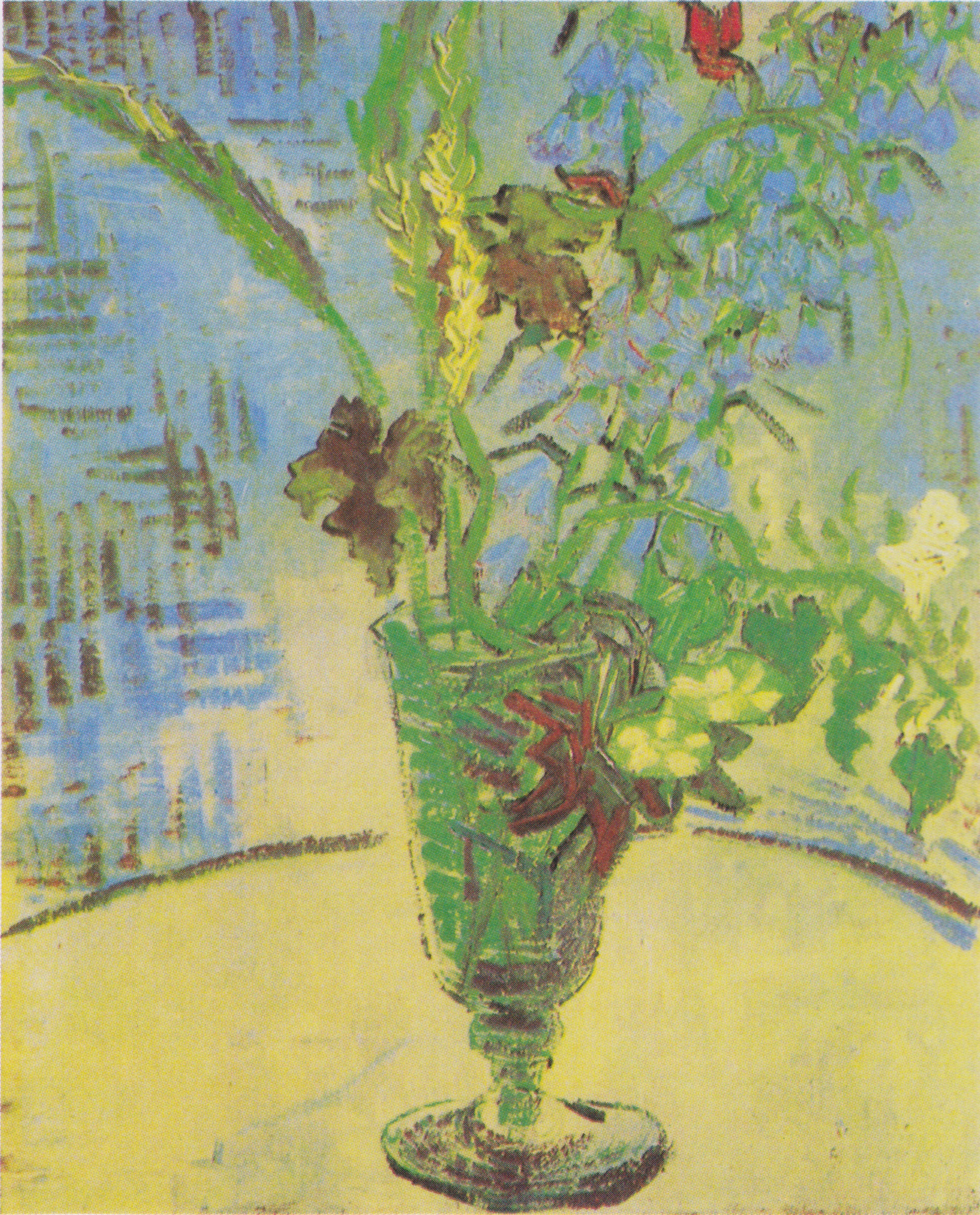
Vincent van Gogh, Flowers in a Vase, 1890

== Post-war ==
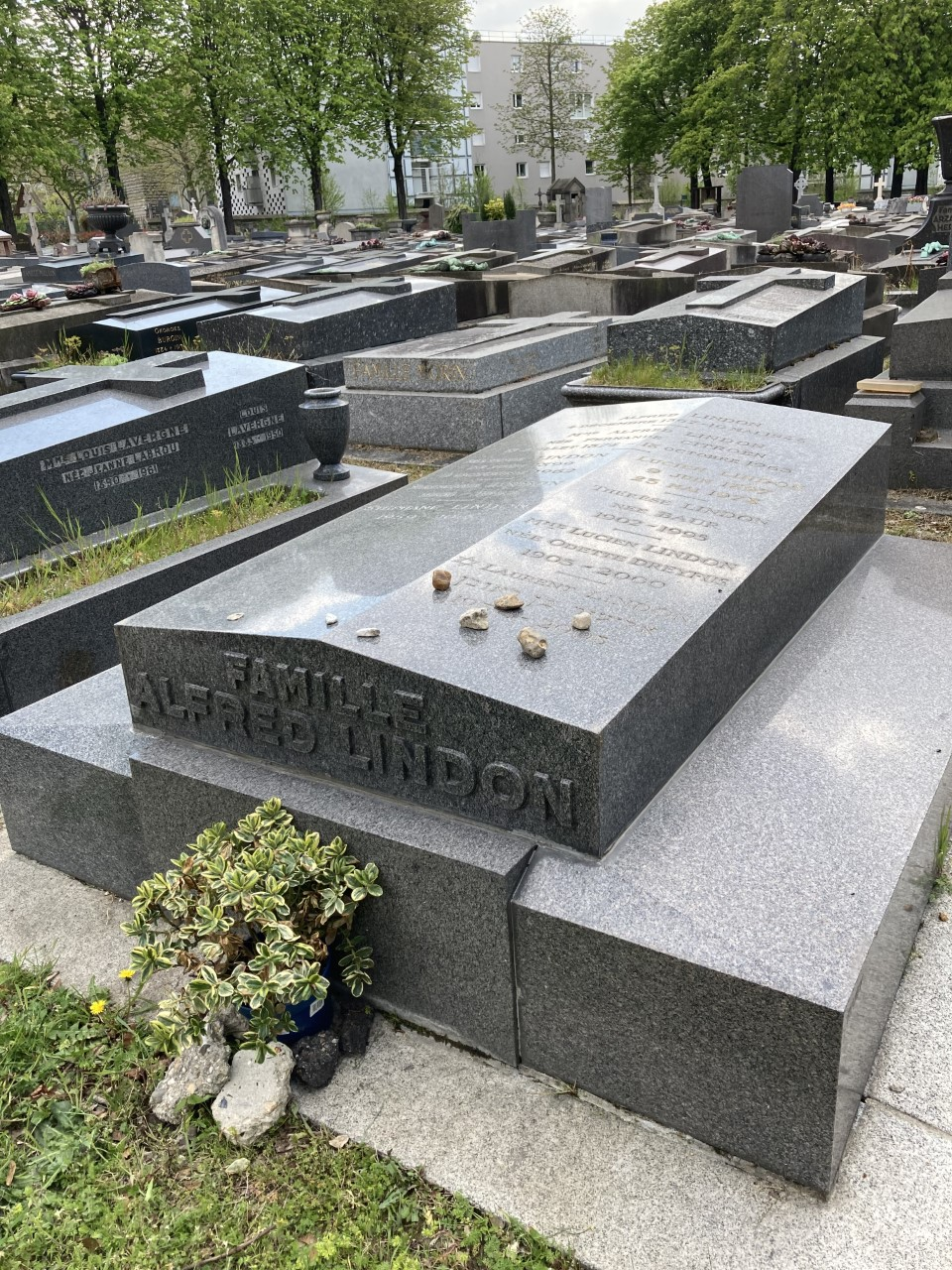
Family grave in Batignolles Cemetery (Paris).

Lindon and his wife returned to Paris after the end of the Second World War in time to see some of their paintings recovered. According to Denis Lindon, who lived with his parents and siblings at his grandfather's home after the war, the contents were intact as the Gestapo had set up office in the building. His grandfather's tapestries and 18th-century furniture were still there, and only the paintings were missing. Alfred Lindon died in 1948.
