= History of violence (disambiguation) =

History of violence may refer to:

- The historical perspective on violence
- A History of Violence, a 2005 American crime thriller film directed by David Cronenberg
- A History of Violence (comics), a 1997 graphic novel written by John Wagner and illustrated by Vince Locke
- A History of Violence (album), the 2008 album by hip-hop group Jedi Mind Tricks
- "History of Violence" (song), a song recorded by Canadian rock band Theory of a Deadman
- Overclocked: A History of Violence, a 2008 video game
- History of Violence (novel), a 2016 novel by Édouard Louis
- A History of Violence (Casualty), the forty-first series of the television series Casualty (2023–2024)
