= The Mosque of Notre Dame =

2005 novel by Elena Petrovna Chudinova

- Author: Elena Petrovna Chudinova
- Original title: Мечеть Парижской Богоматери
- Language: Russian, Serbian, French, Polish, Bulgarian, English, German, Norwegian, Turkish
- Genre: Novel, Dystopia
- Publisher: Вече, Tatamis, Renovamen-Verlag, etc.
- Publication date: 2005
- Publication place: Russia, Serbia, France, Poland, Bulgaria, U.S., Germany, Norway, Turkey

The Mosque of Notre Dame in Paris: 2048 (Russian: Мечеть Парижской Богоматери) is a dystopian novel written by Russian author Elena Chudinova. The novel takes place in 2048 in France, taken over and ruled by Muslim immigrants. The book is written from an anti-Islamic, and as the author asserts, Orthodox Christian viewpoint. Chudinova, who calls herself a committed Christian, calls the genre of this book, "both a novel and a mission".

== Plot ==
Muslim immigrants seized power in Western Europe. Sharia becomes the law of the land, Catholic churches are destroyed and desecrated. Frenchmen who did not convert to Islam are shut in ghettoes. The Notre-Dame de Paris Cathedral is turned into the Al-Frankoni Mosque. The Catholic Church, which by the beginning of the Muslim expansion turned into a "parody of itself", collapses. Only the traditionalist Catholics from the Society of St. Pius X remain and return to the catacombs. The outnumbered members of the Resistance - the maquis - continue to fight. The protagonists of the novel blame the downfall of Europe on liberalism, atheism, tolerance, and the fall of the authority and hollowing out of the Catholic Church through the reforms of the Second Vatican Council. Even though the maquis understand that their resistance will not change anything, their motto is to "die standing". After they find out about impending bloody liquidation of the non-Muslim ghettoes, they join forces with the last remaining Catholics to take over Notre Dame.

== Publication history ==
The novel was published in 2005. By a coincidence, it was published a month before 2005 French riots perpetrated by youth of African, North African, and (to a lesser extent) French heritage.

The novel became a bestseller in Russia, garnered widespread publicity, and was awarded the Bastkon literary prize for 2005. Later, the book was translated into several European languages: Serbian (2006), French (2009), Polish (2012), Bulgarian (2013), English (2015), German (2017), Norwegian and Turkish.

After the French translation was completed, for a long time, a publisher in France could not be found. According to the book's French publisher Jean Robin, potential publishers avoided the book because of its politically incorrect theme. The author and the translator were planning to upload the text of the novel for free distribution on the Internet, but in 2009, a publisher was found - the French publishing house Tatamis headed by Robin, which released the novel on April 15, 2009.

In Turkey, the novel was released in a pirated, unauthorized translation.

== Time period of the novel's events ==
The year in which the main part of the plot takes place is 2048, which is in the title of some editions of the novel. There are opinions that the year is chosen as a reference to George Orwell's Nineteen Eighty-Four.

In the text of the novel there are references to the date of the main events of the novel:

And the Old King, together with the Old Duke, made four paladins into bishops. And the people were very happy and jubilant. This was exactly 60 years ago, Valery, to be precise, it will be 60 years in two months

The leaders of traditionalist Catholics Archbishop Marcel Lefebvre and Bishop Antonio de Castro Mayer consecrated four bishops on June 30, 1988, which serves as a reference to April 30, 2048.

The story of Sofia's kidnapping by Chechen militants is based on the real case of 1999 (when the character of Kolya is by part based on Yevgeny Rodionov).

== Literary criticism ==
The novel portrays "loathing for Islam" in "a warning that can’t easily be dismissed" according to a reviewer in City Journal. The protagonists of the novel are Orthodox Christians and traditionalist Catholics, the followers of Archbishop Marcel Lefebvre.

The author asserted that her opponents accused her of prejudice, xenophobia, paying attention to only radical Islamism, and a limited knowledge of the Quran. In response, Chudinova pointed out that a Christian cannot recognize the equality of Islam and Christianity because the Bible clearly calls Christianity the only true religion. As for tolerance and political correctness, the author herself denounces them in her commentaries to the novel. RIA Novosti's book review called it "the first inroad of Russia's nascent religious right movement into the realm of fiction" but judged the characters to be two-dimensional, calling the work "a fundamentalist Christian pamphlet in the form of a novel". The reviewer also noted that "reading it against the backdrop of the recent French riots was certainly an eerie experience".

== See also ==
- Maskaw Mecca by Andrey Volos
- Submission by Michel Houellebecq
