= Lorin Stein =

American critic, editor, and translator (born 1973)

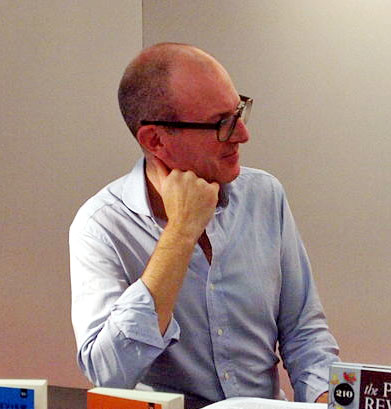
- Stein in 2014
- Born: April 22, 1973 (age 53); Washington, D.C., U.S.
- Education: Yale University; Johns Hopkins University
- Occupations: Literary critic; translator
- Spouse: Sadie Stein

Lorin Hollister Stein (born April 22, 1973) is an American critic, editor, and translator. He was the editor in chief of The Paris Review but resigned in 2017 following several anonymous accusations of sexual impropriety. Under Stein's editorship, The Paris Review won two National Magazine Awards—the first in the category of Essays and Criticism (2011), and the second for General Excellence (2013).

== Personal life ==
Lorin Stein was born and raised in Washington, D.C., where he attended the Sidwell Friends School. He graduated from Yale College in 1995. In 1996 he received an MA from the Johns Hopkins Writing Seminars, where he served as a teaching fellow. Stein currently resides in New York City and is married to the writer and editor Sadie Stein, who worked at the Paris Review from 2011 to 2014. His sister is the literary agent Anna Stein.

== Career ==
After brief tenures as a contributing editor at Might and Publishers Weekly, Stein was hired by Farrar, Straus and Giroux in 1998 as an editorial assistant. He was eventually promoted to senior editor. In 2008, FSG published his translation of Grégoire Bouillier's memoir The Mystery Guest.

Stein succeeded Philip Gourevitch as the fourth editor of The Paris Review in April 2010. In 2015 he translated into English the bestselling novel Submission by French author Michel Houellebecq. He has translated two books by Édouard Louis: History of Violence (2018) and Who Killed My Father (2019).

=== Resignation ===
In October 2017 the Paris Review board started an internal investigation which heard complaints from 'at least two female writers' alleging 'negative encounters' with Stein. It was reported in the New York Times that Stein 'often complimented women on their appearance and suggested they invite attractive friends to [Paris Review] parties'. One writer alleged she had a consensual sexual relationship with Stein, including having sex in his office, and thought that their breakup might have affected Stein's judgment of her work. Her agent confirmed she'd been told of the relationship in 2013. Stein strongly denies ever having taken looks or relationship status into consideration when approving stories.

Another woman in publishing claimed that, a decade earlier, Stein had touched her at a work dinner in an inappropriate way, including touching her knee several times, sliding his hand up her skirt and touching her underwear. She said she had to request to move to a different seat to get him to stop. A friend and her boyfriend at the time confirmed she had spoken to them about the encounter when it happened.

On December 6, 2017, Stein resigned. In his letter of resignation, he wrote: "I blurred the personal and the professional in ways that were, I now recognize, disrespectful of my colleagues and our contributors, and that made them feel uncomfortable or demeaned." Stein acknowledged dating and 'expressing interest in women with whom he had professional connections, including interns and writers for the magazine', conduct that he acknowledged was “an abuse of my position.” He wrote that the "way I behaved was hurtful, degrading and infuriating to a degree that I have only begun to understand this past month." However, Stein maintains that all sexual relations and contact was consensual.

He also left his editor-at-large role at Farrar Straus & Giroux.

In March 2018, an article in Harper's Magazine argued that Stein had been a target of false rumors and that his case was an example of "implausibility and rationalization" in the #MeToo movement.

== Awards and honors ==
Books edited by Stein have received the National Book Award, the Pulitzer Prize, the Los Angeles Times Book Prize, the Believer Book Award, and the National Book Critics Circle Award. His reviews of fiction and poetry and his translations from French have appeared in The New York Review of Books, Harper's, The London Review of Books, The New Republic, n+1, and the Salon Guide to Contemporary Fiction. His translation of Edouard Levé's Autoportrait was nominated for the Best Translated Book Award (2013).

Under Stein's editorship, The Paris Review has won two National Magazine Awards—the first in the category of Essays and Criticism (John Jeremiah Sullivan, "Mister Lytle: An Essay", 2011), and the second for General Excellence (2013).

== See also ==
- The Paris Review
- Farrar, Straus and Giroux
