= Fashion Victims =

- Directed by: Ingo Rasper
- Starring: Edgar Selge; Florian Bartholomäi
- Release date: 18 January 2007 (Max Ophüls Festival)
- Running time: 1h 45min
- Country: Germany
- Language: German

Fashion Victims (German: Reine Geschmacksache) is a 2007 German comedy film directed by Ingo Rasper.

== Cast ==
- Edgar Selge - Wolfgang Zenker
- Florian Bartholomäi - Karsten Zenker
- Roman Knižka - Steven Brookmüller
- Franziska Walser - Erika Zenker
- Traute Hoess - Brigitta
- Gottfried Breitfuss - Polizist Gerhardt
- Marcus Michalski - Juniorchef
- Horst Krause - Horst / Reinigungsangestellte
- Lara Beckmann - Lucie
- Janna Wangenbach - Nicola
- Susanne Rasper - Frau Franzen
- Elert Bode - Herr Schiller
- Jessica Schwarz - Frau Pfeiffer
- Irm Hermann - Frau Retzlaff
