= Herschel und die Musik der Sterne =

- Screenplay by: Percy Adlon
- Directed by: Percy Adlon
- Starring: Karin Anselm as Caroline Herschel; Rolf Illig as William Herschel; Josef Meinrad as Haydn; Edgar Selge as Alexander Herschel
- Music by: Joseph Haydn
- Country of origin: West Germany
- Original language: German

Production
- Cinematography: Raimund Maxsein
- Running time: 95 minutes

Original release
- Release: December 26, 1986

Herschel und die Musik der Sterne (Herschel and the Music of the Stars) is a 1986 television film written, produced, and directed by Percy Adlon. Anneliese Goldman briefly reviewed the film in 1986, concluding that "The superb nuances and timing of all the performances, together with Haydn's music (in both orchestral and electronic forms) and Adlon's inventive use of video, make this "chamber piece" a treat for the eye, ear and mind."

In 1792, the Austrian composer Joseph Haydn was living in England. In July 1792, he visited the Slough observatory of William Herschel, the astronomer and musician who was famed for his discovery of the planet Uranus and its moons. The film is a fictional account of Haydn's visit including extended conversation with Herschel, viewing of the stars with the telescope, and a romantic interlude with William Herschel's sister and collaborator Caroline Lucretia Herschel. Caroline Herschel was a well-known astronomer in her own right. The film suggests that Haydn's famed oratorio The Creation (1797) was inspired by this visit.

In addition to the narrative of this film, several published works in the last century have speculated about a meeting between Herschel and Haydn in Slough and its possible connection to Haydn's composition of The Creation. However, a summary of recent published work indicates that William Herschel was not present when Haydn visited the observatory, and that there is little if any evidence for a direct influence of Herschel's work with the oratorio.

The elaborate set designs in the film are the work of the sculptor Eduardo Paolozzi.

As of 2022, the film with English subtitles is available from several streaming services. A VHS tape of the film was released in 1986.
