= Unterwerfung =

- Screenplay by: Titus Selge
- Directed by: Titus Selge
- Starring: Edgar Selge
- Music by: Daniel Regenberg
- Country of origin: Germany
- Original language: German

Production
- Producer: Clemens Schaeffer
- Cinematography: Martin Farkas
- Editor: Knut Hake
- Running time: 90 minutes
- Production company: Rundfunk Berlin-Brandenburg

Original release
- Release: 6 June 2018

Unterwerfung ("submission") is a 2018 German television drama film directed by Titus Selge and starring Edgar Selge. It is based on the 2015 novel Submission by Michel Houellebecq and a German stage adaptation of the novel.

== Cast ==
- Edgar Selge as François
- Matthias Brandt as Rediger
- Alina Levshin as Myriam
- André Jung as Alain Tanneur
- Florian Stetter as Godefroy Lempereur
- Bettina Stucky as Marie Francois Tanneur
- Michael Wittenborn as Walter Zobel
- Valerie Koch as Alice
- Jean-Yves Berteloot as Steve

== Production ==
The film was produced by Rundfunk Berlin-Brandenburg. The screenplay by Titus Selge is based on Michel Houellebecq's 2015 novel Submission and Karin Beier's stage monologue based on the novel. Edgar Selge who performed the monologue at the Deutsches Schauspielhaus in Hamburg also stars in the film. The film combines conventional film scenes with excerpts from the monologue. The theatre scenes were recorded in July 2017 while principal photography for the rest of the film began on 10 October 2017, with scenes shot in Paris and Berlin.

== Release ==
The film premiered on ARD on 6 June 2018.

== Reviews ==
The Süddeutsche Zeitung called the adaptation "remarkable."
