= Édouard Louis =

French writer (born 1992)

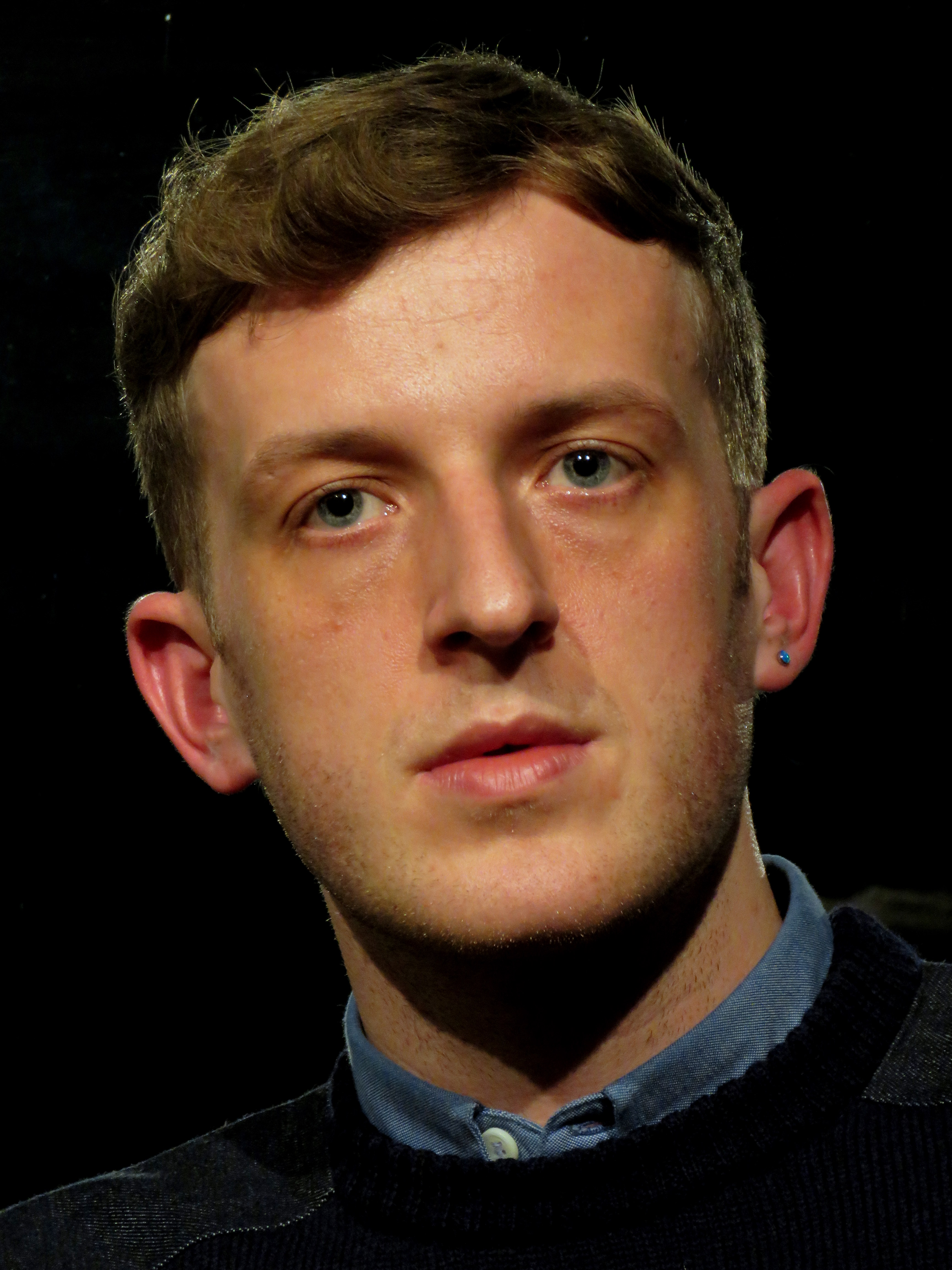
- Louis in 2019
- Born: Eddy Bellegueule; 30 October 1992 (age 33); Hallencourt, France
- Education: École des hautes études en sciences sociales (EHESS); École Normale Supérieure (ENS)
- Occupation: Writer
- Writing career
- Genres: Novel, drama, non-fiction, sociology

Édouard Louis (born Eddy Bellegueule; 30 October 1992) is a French writer.

== Biography ==
Édouard Louis, born Eddy Bellegueule was born and raised in the town of Hallencourt in northern France, which is the setting of his first novel, the autobiographical En finir avec Eddy Bellegueule (2014; published in English in 2018 as The End of Eddy).

Louis grew up in a poor family supported by government welfare: his father was a factory worker for a decade until "One day at work, a storage container fell on him and crushed his back, leaving him bedridden, on morphine for the pain" and unable to work. His mother found occasional work bathing the elderly. The poverty, racism, alcoholism and his homosexuality which he dealt with in his family during his childhood would become the subject of his literary work.

He is the first in his family to attend university. In 2011, he was admitted to two of the most prestigious institutions of higher learning in France, the École Normale Supérieure and to the School for Advanced Studies in the Social Sciences in Paris. In 2013, he officially changed his name to Édouard Louis.

The same year, he edited the collective work, Pierre Bourdieu. L'insoumission en héritage, which analyses the influence of Pierre Bourdieu on critical thinking and political emancipation.

In 2014 he published En finir avec Eddy Bellegueule, an autobiographical novel. The book was the subject of extensive media attention and was hailed for its literary merit and compelling story. The book also generated debate and controversy over social perception of the working class. It was a bestseller in France and has been translated into more than 20 languages.

In September 2015, Édouard Louis wrote an open letter, "Manifesto for an Intellectual and Political Counteroffensive", together with philosopher Geoffroy de Lagasnerie. In the letter, which was published on the front page of Le Monde, and was later reprinted in English by the Los Angeles Review of Books, Louis and Lagasnerie denounce the legitimization of right-wing agendas in public discourse and establish principles by which leftist intellectuals should reengage in public debate.

In 2016, Louis published his second novel, History of Violence. In recounting the story of his rape and attempted murder on Christmas Eve of 2012, the autobiographical novel centres around the cyclical and self-perpetuating nature of violence in society.

In May 2017 Louis wrote "Why My Father Votes for Le Pen", an op-ed that was published on the front page of The New York Times. In the piece, published on the eve of the French presidential election, Louis argued that the rise in popularity of nationalist and right-wing politicians among working class and poor voters in France was a result of changing priorities on the left. In May 2018, Louis released his third novel, Qui a tué mon père (Who Killed My Father), in which he expands upon this theme. He explores the deteriorating health of his father, who had been severely injured in an industrial accident, and the additional bodily harm he endures as a result of political decisions that reduced his financial support and forced him back to work. As with Louis prior novels, Who Killed My Father has been adapted to the stage by numerous directors, including an adaptation by Ivo van Hove, which premiered at the Young Vic theatre in London, and another by Thomas Ostermeier which starred Louis himself in a one-man show which was first staged at Berlin's Schaubühne theatre and later at St Anne's Warehouse. Farrar, Straus, and Giroux released the English translation of Louis' fourth novel, A Woman's Battles and Transformations in 2022.

== Style and influences ==
The work of Édouard Louis maintains a fine link with sociology: the influence of Pierre Bourdieu pervades his novels, which invoke the themes of social exclusion, domination, and poverty. The influence of William Faulkner is also revealed through Louis' superposition in the same sentence of various levels of language – placing the popular vernacular at the heart of his writing. Louis' novel Histoire de la violence contains an essay on Faulkner's novel Sanctuary.

The author says that, by working with various levels of language, he wants to use violence as a literary subject, "I want to make violence a literary space, like Marguerite Duras made a literary space of madness or as Claude Simon made war into a literary space, or as Hervé Guibert did with sickness."

Louis has said that his primary contemporary influence was French sociologist Didier Eribon, whose book Returning to Reims, Louis says "marked a turning point for his future as a writer." He has also included James Baldwin and Simone de Beauvoir amongst "the writers who have meant the most to me".

== Works ==
=== Novels ===
- En finir avec Eddy Bellegueule. Le Seuil. 2014. ISBN 9782021117707. French-language version.
  - The End of Eddy. Translated by Lucey, Michael. Harvill Secker. 2 February 2017. ISBN 978-1846559006. English-language version.
- Histoire de la violence. Le Seuil. 2016. ISBN 978-2021177787. French-language version.
  - History of Violence. Translated by Stein, Lorin. Harvill Secker. 2018. ISBN 978-1787300392. English-language version.
- Qui a tué mon père. Le Seuil. 2018. ISBN 978-2021399431. French-language version.
  - Who Killed My Father. Translated by Stein, Lorin. Harvill Secker. 2019. ISBN 978-1787301221. English-language version.
- Combats et métamorphoses d'une femme. Le Seuil. 2021. ISBN 978-2021312546. French-language version.
  - A Woman's Battles and Transformations. Translated by Aw, Tash. Farrar, Straus and Giroux. 2022. ISBN 978-0374606749. English-language version.
- Changer: methode. Le Seuil. 2021. ISBN 978-2021483048. French-language version.
  - Change. Translated by Lambert, John. Harvill Secker. 2024. ISBN 978-1787303256. English-language version.
- Monique s'évade. Éditions du Seuil. 2024. French-language version.
  - Monique Escapes. Translated by Lambert, John. Harvill Secker. 2026. ISBN 978-1787305045. English-language version.
- L'effondrement. Éditions du Seuil. 2024. French-language version.
  - Collapse. Translated by Aw, Tash. Harvill Secker. 2026. ISBN 978-1787305038. English-language version.

=== Non-fiction ===
- Pierre Bourdieu. L'insoumission en héritage, Édouard Louis (editor), Annie Ernaux, Didier Eribon, Arlette Farge, Frédéric Lordon, Geoffroy de Lagasnerie et Frédéric Lebaron, (Presses Universitaires de France, 2013; ISBN 978-2-13-061935-2).
- Foucault contre lui-même (Foucault against himself), François Caillat (editor), Édouard Louis (director), avec Geoffroy de Lagasnerie, Arlette Farge, Didier Eribon, (Presses Universitaires de France, 2014; ISBN 978-2-13-063289-4).

== Awards ==
- 2014 : Pierre Guénin Prize against homophobia and for equal rights, for his work En finir avec Eddy Bellegueule.
