= Thomas Ostermeier =

German theatre director (born 1968)

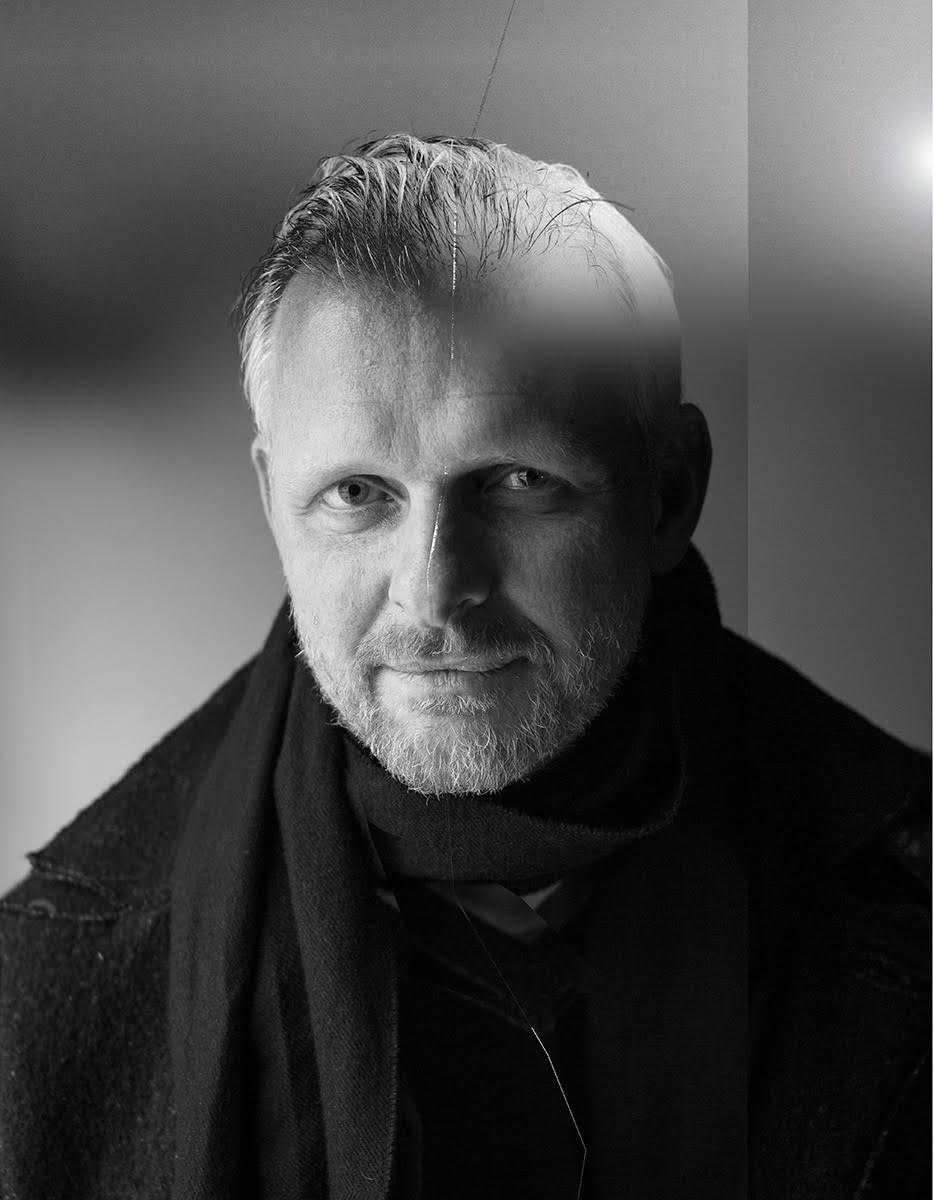
Thomas Ostermeier photographed by Oliver Mark at the Berlin's Schaubühne, 2018

Thomas Ostermeier (born 3 September 1968, Soltau, West Germany) is a German theatre director. He currently mainly works for the Berlin Schaubühne.

Ostermeier is fluent in German, French and English.

== Career ==
Ostermeier began his theatrical career in 1990 acting under director Einar Schleef, one of his major inspirations, in his Faust project at Berlin's Hochschule für Künste. After the Faust project concluded in 1991, Ostermeier began studying directing at the Ernst Busch Academy of Dramatic Arts in Berlin where in 1992 he met his mentor Manfred Karge. From 1993 to 1994 Ostermeier acted as Karge's assistant director and also acted in Weimar and at the Berliner Ensemble, when Heiner Müller was artistic director.

=== Deutsches Theater, 1996–1999 ===
In 1996, Ostermeier was asked to take over as artistic director for the Barracke at the Deutsches Theater, an offer he attributes to his production of a play by the Russian symbolist Alexander Blok at Ernst Busch, which was seen by the Barracke's then chief dramaturg.

Ostermeier brought dramaturg Jens Hillje and designer Stefan Schmidke, both of whom he continues to work with, to the Barracke. The three created a five-year programme aiming to mirror reality and dealing with the themes of sex, drugs, and criminality. During his time at the Barracke from 1996 to 1999, Ostermeier began developing the aesthetic he is known for today. Early in his career Ostermeier identified the major problem of German theatre as too much decoration and celebration of celebrity. He rebelled against this aesthetic, embracing the “intimate and violent” psychological realism emerging among young British playwrights like Sarah Kane, Mark Ravenhill, Enda Walsh and Martin Crimp. These British playwrights were inspired by their difficult social situations, making their plays more interesting and inspiring for Ostermeier than the work of their German counterparts. Ostermeier is credited with bringing these new in-yer-face dramas to Germany, thus giving the playwrights international attention, and inspiring young German dramatists, such as Marius von Mayenburg, to create similar dramas. The 1998 production of Ravenhill's Shopping and Fucking won Ostermeier international attention and an invitation to the Berliner Theatertreffen as well as recognition as the enfant terrible of German theatre.

Ostermeier became known for his genre of Capitalist realism, which he is still known for today. This aesthetic forces his audience to watch the gritty violence of reality caused by a ruthless capitalist system. This form of realism "seeks revenge on the blindness, and stupidity of the world." Ostermeier seeks to challenge his audience by problematizing the modern societal values of Germany and Europe. His realist aesthetic is indicative of his own left wing political beliefs, which starkly criticize Western capitalism and the values of modern European society.

In 1997, Ostermeier began applying his realist aesthetic onto classic plays, the most notable being Henrik Ibsen's A Doll's House with Anne Tismer. The production marked the beginning of a longstanding collaboration between Ostermeier and designer Jan Pappelbaum. As well as marking the start of Ostermeier's revivals of pieces of classic theatre with reimagined endings, Nora met with international success. It toured around Europe and in 2004 travelled to New York. This new approach to classical pieces was applied to Hedda Gabler (2006) – winner of both the Nestroy Theatre Prize and the Politika prize at the Belgrade International Theatre Festival as well as audience award at Theatergemeinde Berlin – and numerous other plays, including 2008's production of William Shakespeare's Hamlet with Lars Eidinger, gaining Ostermeier international recognition as one of German's leading young directors. Additionally, these interpretations of classics focused his aesthetic specifically on to the theme of the loss of utopia, while maintaining the intimacy and violence present in his earlier works.

=== Schaubühne, 1999–present ===
In 1999, at only thirty-two years old, Ostermeier left the Barracke to become a resident director and member of the artistic direction at Berlin's Schaubühne, making him one of the youngest successful directors in Germany.

Known for making outlandish statements about the older generation of German theatre directors, Ostermeier found himself in trouble at the Vienna Festival in 2001. A comment made by Ostermeier stating directors over forty were "no longer in contact with the developing culture and should give up directing," was taken personally by festival director Luc Bondy. The dispute took the form of a bitter confrontation through the local media and marked Ostermeier's final invitation to the Vienna event.

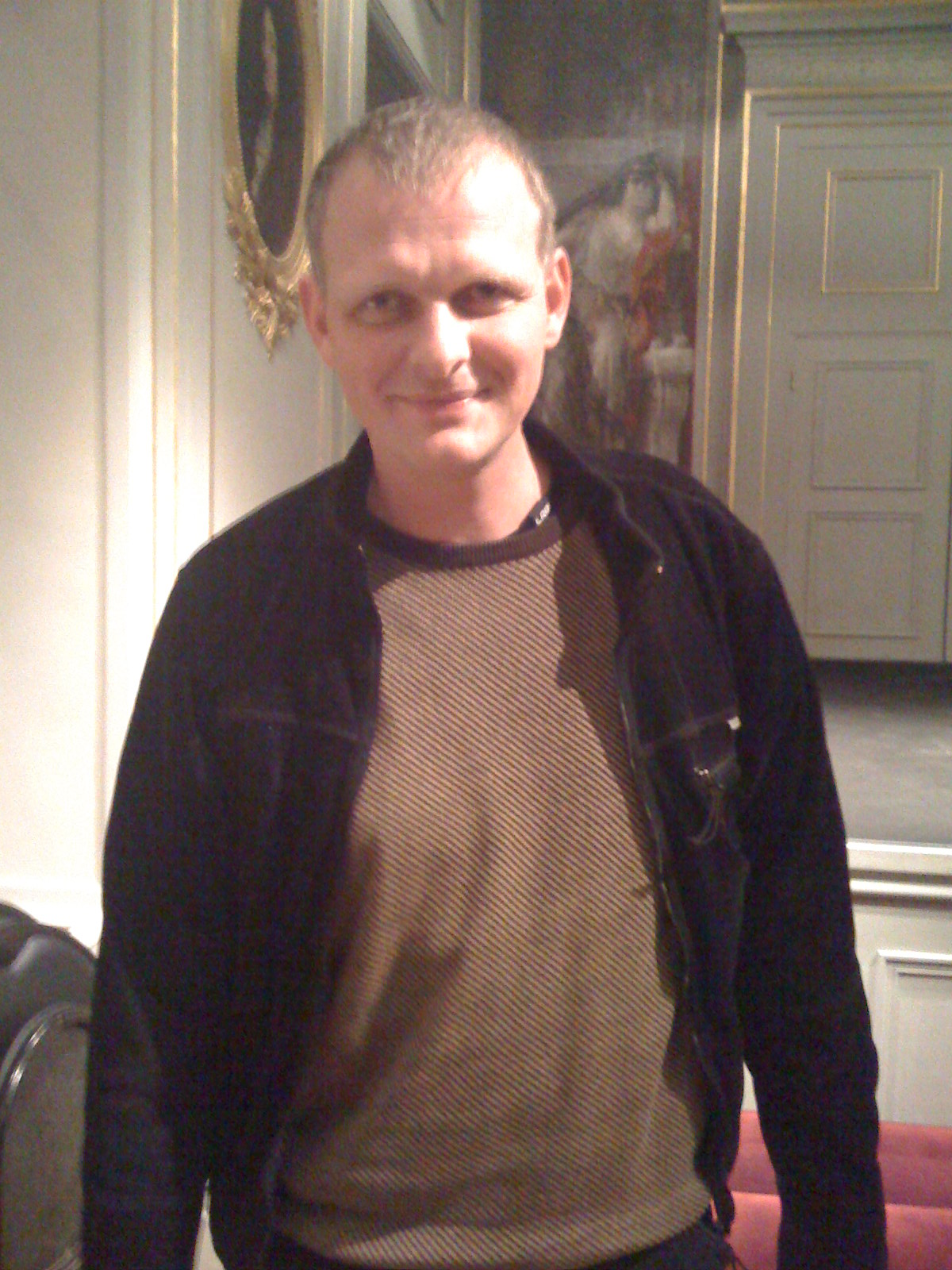
Picture of Thomas Ostermeier. Made at Théâtre de l'Odéon, Paris, on Friday, April 10th, 2009 after the performance of "John Gabriel Borkman"

Despite his success Ostermeier still remains true to the gritty realism he became known for during his time at the Barracke.

In 2004, Ostermeier made his American debut with a production of A Doll's House at the Brooklyn Academy of Music.

In 2012, Ostermeier staged a highly publicized Arabic-language performance of Hamlet in the West Bank.

Asked by theatre critic Octavian Saiu at an online event what he fears the most during the COVID-19 pandemic, Ostermeier replied that he fears his own death and added that everyone, regardless of their age, should have the right to live; everything should be done to protect it.

Also from 2020, Ostermeier presented Who Killed My Father, an adaptation of a 2018 book by Édouard Louis with the lead role played by the author himself, in his stage debut, at the Théâtre des Abbesses in Paris.

In 2024, Ostermeier directed his version of Ibsen's An Enemy of the People with Matt Smith at London's Duke of York's Theatre; it was the first time he directed the play in English. In 2025, he and Duncan Macmillan adapted The Seagull with Cate Blanchett, Tom Burke, Jason Watkins, Emma Corrin and Kodi Smit-McPhee at the Barbican Centre in London.

== Recognition and reputation ==
In 2000, Ostermeier was awarded the Europe Prize Theatrical Realities, with the following motivation:

Whilst working at the "Baracke" in Berlin, Thomas Ostermeier has succeeded in leading contemporary theatre in a precise, independent direction by exploiting the discovery of new dramatists and combining this with a suitable style of direction, based - in addition to his exceptional ability to choose and direct the actors - on a timing and vision that can be compared with the cinema, life and urban imagery. Thus Ostermeier has contributed towards expressing the anxieties of the younger generations by giving a faithful, moving picture of them on stage, which is far from being "academic" and recreates a direct link with what happens in society and what is staged in the theatre. Ostermeier's theatre thus generates new energies and interests a new German and European audience.

Ostermeier was appointed officer of the Ordre des Arts et des Lettres in 2009 by France's Ministry of Culture. From 2010 to 2018, he served as president of the German-French Council of Culture, alongside Jacques Toubon. His 2008 production of Hamlet has won numerous international awards including Best International Production of 2011, and in 2011 Ostermeier received a Golden Lion at the Venice Biennale for his work.

In 2016, Newsweek called him "Germany's best-known stage director and, at least according to the leading European theater scholar Peter Boenisch, its most important".

== See also ==
- List of German speaking theatre directors in the 20th and 21st centuries

== Sources ==
- Carlson, Marvin. “Chapter 8: Thomas Ostermeier.” Theatre is More Beautiful than War: German Stage Directing in the Late Twentieth Century. Iowa City: University of Iowa Press, 2009. pp. 161–180.
- Ostermeier, Thomas. “Die Zukunft des Theaters.” Theory Texts. 2013. pp. 1–10.
- Ostermeier, Thomas. "Talk mit dem Theaterregisseur Thomas Ostermeier" with Hajo Schumacher. Typisch Deutsch. Deutsche Welle. www.YouTube.com. 15 April 2012.
- Pearson, Joseph. Wer Da? Begegnungen mit Thomas Ostermeier. Berlin: Alexander Verlag, 2026.
- Schafer, Yvonne. “Interview with Thomas Ostermeier.” Western European Stages. 11:2. Spring 1999. pp. 49–54.
- Zaroulia, Marilena. “Staging Hamlet After the ‘In-Yer-Face’ Moment.” Contemporary Theatre Review. 20:4 (2010). 501–504.
