= Richie Hofmann =

American poet

- Born: Richard Joseph Hofmann; May 26, 1987 (age 39)
- Education: Boston University (BA); Johns Hopkins University (MFA); Emory University (PhD)
- Occupation: Poet
- Spouse: Ryan Hagerty
- Writing career
- Genres: American poetry, Ekphrastic poetry

Richard "Richie" Joseph Hofmann, is an American poet, Guggenheim Fellow, winner of the Alice James Award, and the Pushcart Prize. He is regularly published in The New Yorker, and has been featured in The Atlantic, The New York Times and The New York Review of Books. Hofmann was the Jones Lecturer in poetry at Stanford University, where he taught poetry and creative writing courses. As of 2025, he is a lecturer in the University of Chicago undergraduate core curriculum.

== Life and career ==
Hofmann is of German descent on both sides, with his father's family originating from Speyer. He spent his early childhood in Munich, which he cites as formative in his exploration of the concept of time, and his relationship to Europe within poetry.

He has contributed to The New Yorker since 2013, including audio readings for the online portion of the magazine. In interviews Hofmann often cites music, in particular opera and musicals, as having a strong influence on his life and work. He has described Sondheim's music as "the rock of my life", and wrote the poem "Birthday" as a tribute to Mozart. Hofmann collaborated with the composer Brian Baxter to write the lyrics for the piece "Old World Elegy" for voice and string quartet. The world premier was held in Chicago, hosted by the Poetry Foundation, and won the Memorious Art Song Contest of 2013.

Hofmann's work often explores male desire, and relationship to the body. Comparisons drawn between his work and that of the late French autofiction writer and photographer Hervé Guibert, led Hofmann to write more "intensely, in a way which was more vulgar". He also frequently includes classical themes and images in his poetry.

In 2015 Hofmann published his first collection of poems, titled Second Empire, which was awarded the 2014 Alice James Award, then known as the Beatrice Hawley Award, by Alice James Books and became critically acclaimed. That year he also co-founded Lightbox Poetry, an online educational resource for creative writing, with fellow poet Kara van de Graaf. One of his most widely known poems is "Book of Statues", about the hate crime murder of Matthew Shepard on October 12, 1998. The poem was first published by the Academy of American Poets Poem-a Day on October 12, 2016. On the twentieth remembrance of Matthew Shepard's murder in 2018, The New York Times featured his poem with a reading by actor Matt Bomer.

Hofmann published his second poetry collection A Hundred Lovers in 2022 with Random House. The book was featured in the list of top "46 Must-Read Books by Queer Writers" in Esquire Magazine.

In 2026 Hofmann published his third collection, titled The Bronze Arms , a queer coming-of-age poetry book that draws on his childhood near-drowning in Crete and imagery from classical antiquity to explore themes of desire, vulnerability, and survival.

== Awards ==
Hofmann has been the beneficiary of several fellowships, including the Ruth Lilly Fellowship from the Poetry Foundation and the Stegner Fellowship from Stanford University.

For his first collection of poems, Second Empire, Hofmann won the Alice James Award, then known as the Beatrice Hawley Award, in 2014.

In 2025, Hofmann was named a Guggenheim Fellow and awarded a Literature Fellowship from National Endowment for the Arts.

Hofmann's third poetry collection, The Bronze Arms was longlisted in the National Book Awards for Poetry in 2026.

== Personal life ==
Hofmann is married to Ryan Hagerty to whom his first book, Second empire, is dedicated. He has lived between the cities of Chicago and San Francisco.

== Poetry collections ==
- Hofmann, Richie (2015). Second Empire (First ed.). Farmington, Maine: Alice James. ISBN 9781938584169.
- Hofmann, Richie (2022). A Hundred Lovers : Poems (First ed.). New York: Knopf. ISBN 9780593320983.
- Hofmann, Richie (2026). The Bronze Arms (First ed.). New York: Alfred A. Knopf. ISBN 9780593804742.

== See also ==
- 2014 in poetry
- Cultural depictions of Matthew Shepard
- Hervé Guibert
