= Rosa Freire d'Aguiar =

Brazilian journalist, editor, and translator (b. 1948)

Rosa Freire d'Aguiar (born August 28, 1948, in Rio de Janeiro) is a Brazilian journalist, editor and translator.

== Education and journalistic career ==
In 1971, she graduated in journalism at the Pontifícia Universidade Católica of Rio de Janeiro – PUC-Rio. Between 1971 and 1973, she was a reporter of the magazines Manchete (available in full at the Brazilian National Library Digital Library), Fatos & Fotos and the Encyclopedia Bloch, of Bloch Editores, Rio de Janeiro.

In 1973, she moved to Paris, where she worked for three years as an international correspondent in the French branch of Bloch's group.

Between 1977 and 1985, still in Paris, she was a correspondent for the newsmagazine "Isto É" and also for the "Jornal da República" and contributor to the magazine "ArteHoje". == She has produced a large number of special reports in Europe, the Middle East and China. Among them, the redemocratization of Spain, from the death of Francisco Franco from 1975 to 1985; the exile of Ayatollah Khomeini and the Iranian revolution, 1979–1980; the trial of the Gang of Four in Beijing in 1980; the return of the Sinai desert to Egypt in 1982; the 1982 Lebanon War; the peace movement in Germany in 1983.

She has also conducted several interviews with writers, social scientists and artists. Among the many personalities interviewed by Rosa Freire d'Aguiar, the following stand out: Elisabeth Badinter, Ernesto Sabato, Eugène Ionesco, Fernand Braudel, Georges Simenon, Jorge Semprún, Julio Cortazar, Conrad Detrez, Michel Serres, Peter Brook, Roland Barthes, Romain Gary, Rudolf Nureyev, Raymond Aron and Simone Veil.

== Translating and editing ==
Rosa Freire d'Aguiar left journalism and became a translator and an editor for some publishing houses. Since 1991 she has translated and edited more than a hundred books, mainly for Companhia das Letras and Editora Todavia.

Among those authors, Louis-Ferdinand Céline, Italo Calvino, Michel de Montaigne, Claude Lévi-Strauss, Pierre Bourdieu, Marquis de Sade, Honoré de Balzac and Marcel Proust. For his work, she received several awards, among them, the Latin Union of Scientific and Technical Translation, in 2001, for the translation of the book "L'univers, les dieux, les hommes", by Jean-Pierre Vernant. In 2009, she received the Jabuti Prize for the translation of the book "The Elegance of the Hedgehog", by Muriel Barbery. In 2019, she received the Paulo Rónai Translation Prize, from the Brazilian National Library, for the book "Bússola", by Mathias Énard.

== Publications ==
She is the author of "Memória de tradutora" (Escritório do Livro, Florianópolis, 2004); "Palavra puxa palavra: uma homenagem aos 70 anos da saga O tempo e o vento” (e-book, Companhia das Letras, São Paulo, 2019), containing a long interview with Érico Veríssimo; “Sempre Paris – crônica de uma cidade, seus escritores, seus artistas" (Companhia das Letras, São Paulo, 2023), winner of Jabuti Award – Best Chronicle Book (2024) and Jabuti Award – Book of the Year (2024). For the translation of Manet: A Symbolic Revolution, won First Place in the Translation category of the ABEU Award (Brazilian Association of University Publishers) (2024).

== Personal life ==
In 1979, she married the Brazilian economist Celso Furtado, in exile in France since 1964, who taught at the Sorbonne University.

In 1986 the couple returned to Brazil and settled in Brasilia, where Celso Furtado was designated Ministry of Culture.

== Organisational affiliations ==
Rosa Freire d'Aguiar was the founder of the International Celso Furtado Centre for Development Policies (CICEF) in November 2005, whose members are Brazilians and international intellectuals and politicians. Between 2005 and 2009, she was the first Cultural President of the association, and after, member of the Deliberative Board until 2012. In 2019, she donated the private library and the archives of Celso Furtado to the Institute of Brazilian Studies - IEB, of the University of São Paulo.
