= Hervé Guibert =

French writer and photographer (1955–1991)

- Born: 14 December 1955; Saint-Cloud, Hauts-de-Seine, France
- Died: 27 December 1991 (aged 36); Paris, France
- Resting place: Cimitero di Rio nell'Elba, Provincia di Livorno, Toscana, Italy
- Occupations: Writer, Photographer
- Writing career
- Language: French
- Years active: 1977-1991
- Genres: Autofiction, autobiographical novel, diary, essay
- Notable work: À l'ami qui ne m'a pas sauvé la vie
- Notable awards: César Award for Best Original Screenplay or Adaptation

Hervé Guibert (14 December 1955 – 27 December 1991) was a French writer, photographer, photography critic and filmmaker. A multidisciplinary artist, his work focused on writing, photography and film, and is closely associated with autofiction and autobiographical writing.

Guibert's writing frequently drew on his intimate relationships, including his relationships with Thierry Jouno, Michel Foucault and Vincent Marmousez, who appear in fictionalised or semi-fictionalised form in his work. From the late 1970s to the mid-1980s, he worked as a photography critic for Le Monde. In 1984, Guibert and Patrice Chéreau won the César Award for Best Original Screenplay and Dialogues for L'Homme blessé.

He became widely known after the publication of À l'ami qui ne m'a pas sauvé la vie in 1990, a roman à clef about illness, friendship and AIDS that included a fictionalised portrait of Foucault. His final books and video work made his experience of AIDS unusually public in French literary and television culture at the beginning of the 1990s.

== Life and career ==
=== Early life ===
Guibert was born in Saint-Cloud, Hauts-de-Seine, on 14 December 1955. He grew up in Paris and La Rochelle in a middle-class family. As a young man he was interested in cinema and acting before turning increasingly to writing, photography and journalism.

=== Career ===
After working as a filmmaker and actor, he turned to photography and journalism. In 1978, he successfully applied for a job at France's evening paper Le Monde and published his second book, Les Aventures singulières (published by Éditions de Minuit). In 1984, Guibert shared a César Award for Best Original Screenplay with Patrice Chéreau for L'homme blessé. Guibert had met Chéreau in the 1970s during his theatrical years. He won a scholarship between 1987 and 1989 at Villa Medicis in Rome with his friend, writer Mathieu Lindon. He described these years in L'Incognito, published in 1989.

Guibert's writing style was inspired by the French writer Jean Genet and, later, by the work of Austrian writer Thomas Bernhard. Three of his lovers occupied an important place in his life and work: Thierry Jouno, director of the International Visual Theatre for the deaf in Paris, whom he met in 1976; Michel Foucault, whom he met in 1977; and Vincent Marmousez, a teenager of fifteen who inspired his novel Fou de Vincent (published in English as Crazy for Vincent).

For a time in the 1980s Guibert was a reader at the institute for young blind in Paris, Institut National des Jeunes Aveugles, which led to his novel Des aveugles (published in English as Blindsight).

=== AIDS, final works and death ===
In January 1988 Guibert was diagnosed with AIDS. From then on, he worked at recording what was left of his life. In June the following year, he married Christine, the partner of Thierry Jouno, so that his royalty income would eventually pass to her and her two children. In 1990, Guibert publicly revealed his HIV status in his roman à clef À l'ami qui ne m'a pas sauvé la vie (published in English as To the Friend Who Did Not Save My Life). Nina Bouraoui in The Guardian described the book thus:

"In this book, he tells the story of his illness, AIDS, in the late 1980s. He tells of how life with the virus became an existential adventure, how it affected a generation, how it stole his friends and lovers, and how writing was for him a bulwark against death and destruction. It's the story of an era, a turning point – when AIDS transformed our relationship with desire and sexuality forever."

Upon publication, Guibert immediately found himself the focus of media attention, featured in newspapers and appearing on several television talk shows, including Apostrophes, a literary program with a wide audience.

To the Friend Who Did Not Save My Life was followed by two additional autofictional novels detailing the progress of his illness: Le Protocole compassionnel (1991; published in English as The Compassionate Protocol) and L'Homme au chapeau rouge (published in English as The Man in the Red Hat), which was released posthumously in January 1992. In his last work, Cytomégalovirus (1992), he describes a hospitalization in autumn 1991 and his increasing blindness caused by disease.

Between July 1990 and February 1991, Guibert filmed scenes from his daily life living with AIDS, which became the film La Pudeur ou l'impudeur. The film was produced by Pascale Breugnot and edited by Maureen Mazurek and was broadcast posthumously on French television. According to scholar Ross Chambers, the title (which can be roughly translated as "decorum or indecorum") refers to questions of how to present the realities of illness and death to an audience "readily shocked by what it does not wish to know about".

In December 1991, Guibert attempted to end his life by taking digitalin. He died two weeks later, on 27 December 1991.

== Posthumous works, influence and reception ==
In 2022, the journalist and writer Mathieu Lindon published Hervelino (Semiotext(e)). Translated by Jeffrey Zuckerman, the book chronicles the start of their friendship, along with Foucault, as well as the years they both spent living in Rome. Letters to Eugène: Correspondence 1977–1987 (Semiotext(e)) was published the same year. The book details correspondences between Guibert and Eugène Savitzkaya and is translated by Christine Pichini.

Guibert's work received renewed English-language attention in the 2010s and 2020s through new translations and reissues, including Crazy for Vincent, Written in Invisible Ink: Selected Stories, My Manservant and Me, Letters to Eugène and Suzanne and Louise. Through these translations, Guibert has become more known in the US and is a noted growing influence among writers including Garth Greenwell, Richie Hofmann, Édouard Louis and Ocean Vuong.

The poet Richie Hofmann has repeatedly identified Guibert as an influence on his poetry. In a 2022 interview with The Adroit Journal, Hofmann said that Guibert's writing inspired him to write "more frankly and intensely" and that he was interested in working out questions raised by Guibert's prose within poetry. In a conversation published by The Yale Review, Hofmann called Guibert "one powerful spirit" behind his recent poetry.

Guibert's photography has also been the subject of posthumous exhibitions and renewed critical attention. In 2011, the Maison européenne de la photographie in Paris presented the first retrospective of Guibert's photographic work, comprising around 200 photographs and including a presentation of La Pudeur ou l'Impudeur. Later exhibitions included Les palais des monstres désirables at Les Douches la Galerie in Paris in 2018 and a retrospective presented by the Loewe Foundation during PHotoESPAÑA in Madrid in 2019. Guibert's photographs had been shown in retrospectives at the Maison européenne de la photographie and the Loewe Foundation, as well as in solo exhibitions in New York, Paris, Los Angeles and Vienna.

== Selected works ==
=== Original works in French ===
- La Mort propagande, Régine Deforges, 1977
- Suzanne et Louise, Hallier, 1980
- L'Image fantôme, Éditions de Minuit, 1981
- Les Aventures singulières, Éditions de Minuit, 1982
- Les Chiens, Éditions de Minuit, 1982
- Voyage avec deux enfants, Éditions de Minuit, 1982
- Les Lubies d'Arthur, Éditions de Minuit, 1983
- L'Homme blessé: scénario et notes, with Patrice Chéreau, Éditions de Minuit, 1983
- Le Seul Visage, Éditions de Minuit, 1984
- Des aveugles, Gallimard, 1985
- Mes parents, Gallimard, 1986
- Vous m'avez fait former des fantômes, Gallimard, 1987
- Les Gangsters, Éditions de Minuit, 1988
- Mauve le Vierge, Gallimard, 1988
- Fou de Vincent, Éditions de Minuit, 1989
- L'Incognito, Gallimard, 1989
- À l'ami qui ne m'a pas sauvé la vie, Gallimard, 1990
- Le Protocole compassionnel, Gallimard, 1991
- Mon valet et moi, Éditions du Seuil, 1991
- Vice, Jacques Bertoin, 1991
- L'Homme au chapeau rouge, Gallimard, 1992
- Cytomégalovirus, Éditions du Seuil, 1992
- Le Paradis, Gallimard, 1992
- Photographies, Gallimard, 1993
- Le Mausolée des amants, Gallimard, 2001
- Articles intrépides, 1977–1985, Gallimard, 2008

=== Selected English translations ===
- The Gangsters, translated by Iain White, Serpent's Tail, 1991
- To the Friend Who Did Not Save My Life, translated by Linda Coverdale, Serpent's Tail, 1993; Semiotext(e), 2020
- My Parents, translated by Liz Heron, Serpent's Tail, 1994
- The Compassion Protocol, translated by James Kirkup, Braziller, 1994
- Blindsight, translated by James Kirkup, Quartet, 1995
- The Man in the Red Hat, translated by James Kirkup, Quartet, 1995
- Ghost Image, translated by Robert Bononno, Sun and Moon, 1996; University of Chicago Press, 2014
- Cytomegalovirus: A Hospitalization Diary, translated by Clara Orban, University Press of America, 1996; Fordham University Press, 2015
- Paradise, translated by James Kirkup, Quartet, 1996
- Crazy for Vincent, translated by Christine Pichini, Semiotext(e), 2017
- Written in Invisible Ink: Selected Stories, translated by Jeffrey Zuckerman, Semiotext(e), 2020
- Arthur's Whims, translated by Dana Lupo, Spurl, 2021
- My Manservant and Me, translated by Jeffrey Zuckerman, Nightboat Books, 2022
- Letters to Eugène: Correspondence 1977–1987, translated by Christine Pichini, Semiotext(e), 2022
- Suzanne and Louise, translated by Christine Pichini, Magic Hour Press, 2024
