= Who Killed My Father =

2018 book by French writer Édouard Louis

- French language 1st edition Qui a tué mon père
- Author: Édouard Louis
- Publication date: 2018
- Publication place: France
- Preceded by: History of Violence

Who Killed My Father (French: Qui a tué mon père) is a 2018 book by French writer Édouard Louis. It was first released in French in May 2018. An English translation by Lorin Stein was published in 2020.

== Structure and story ==
The book is a non-chronological account of several anecdotes about the author's life living with his father. Louis tells different stories about living with his father, sometimes with contradictory details. Some scenes are violent, while some are loving. The book's title is not a question, and Louis addresses the list of those he considers responsible for the destruction of his father's body, and pending death. These are, according to him, politicians and political people who have passed reforms impacting the poor. Specifically, he blames French presidents Jacques Chirac, Nicolas Sarkozy and François Hollande, as well as Emmanuel Macron, the French president at the time of the book's publication.

== Reception ==
Writing for Télérama, Fabienne Pascaud referred to the book as a "poignant ode". Similarly, Pierre Vavasseur wrote in Le Parisien that the book is both "angry and poignant".

== Translations ==
A German translation was published in January 2019.

An English translation by Lorin Stein was published in 2019.

A Polish translation was published in 2021.

A Hungarian translation was published in 2024.
