= Arlette Farge =

French historian

- Arlette Farge
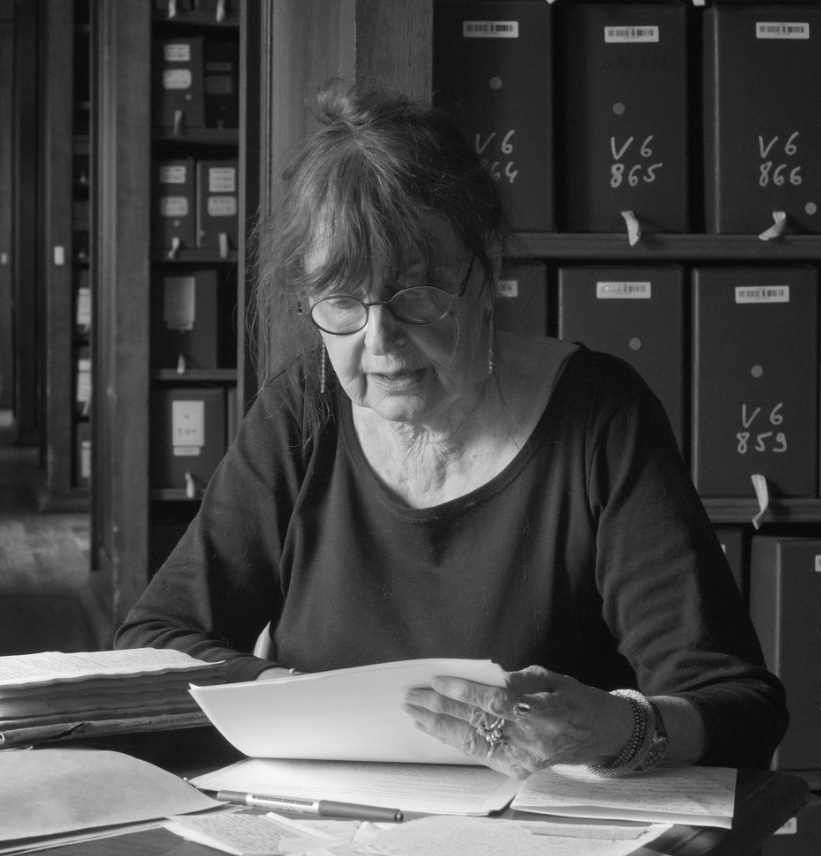
- Born: Arlette Simone Madeleine Eliet; 14 September 1941
- Education: École pratique des hautes études, Paris Nanterre University
- Occupation: Historian
- Employers: French National Centre for Scientific Research; School for Advanced Studies in the Social Sciences
- Notable work
- Awards: Dan David Prize (2016); Knight of the National Order of Merit (1993)

Arlette Farge (born 14 September 1941) is a French historian who specialises in the study of the 18th century, a director of research at the CNRS, attached to the centre for historical research at the EHESS.

== Life and career ==
Arlette is the youngest of three siblings born into a modest family which came to Charleville because of the needs of World War II. After attending the Lycée Hélène Boucher in Paris, she studied to become a juge des enfants, a magistrate specialised in juvenile law, then changed her focus to take an advanced diploma (DEA) in legal and institutional history. With no post available, she left France in 1969 to do her thesis at Cornell University where she bore witness to the activism of African-American students during the Civil Rights Movement and American feminists.

On her return to France, she started to prepare her doctorate in modern history on Le vol d'aliment à Paris au XVIII^{e} siècle (The Theft of Food in Paris in the 18th century), defended in 1974 under the supervision of Robert Mandrou, a pupil of Lucien Febvre, and the pioneer of the history of mentalities. She then specialised in the study of the poorest communities of the capital. In 2016 she was awarded the Dan David Prize.

With her research team from the "groupe d'histoire des femmes" (women's history group), she next worked on the themes of popular identity, gender relations and historical narrative in the 18th century.

After having co-hosted the show Les Lundis de l’histoire (History Mondays) on France Culture, she regularly collaborates on La Fabrique de l’Histoire (The History Factory), a broadcast from the same radio station.

The Allure of the Archives is a regarded historiographical classic and has been published in 51 editions worldwide since 1981 in seven languages. It provides a vivid and intimate insight into the lives of the poor in pre-revolutionary France, particularly women, as well as into the world of archival research.

Michel Foucault inspired her to analyse the mechanisms of power. With him, she co-edited a volume that analysed lettres de cachet against unruly family members such as those engaged in adultery or domestic violence against their spouse during the reign of Louis XIV, Le Desordre des Familes: Lettres de Cachet des Archives de la Bastille au XVII siecle (1982). In 2017, this was translated into English as Disorderly Families: Infamous Letters from the Bastille Archives (2017)

== Bibliography ==
- Vivre dans la rue à Paris au XVIIIe siècle (1979)
- Le désordre des familles: lettres de cachet des Archives de la Bastille au XVIIe siecle (1982) (Translated by Thomas Scott-Railton: Disorderly Families: Infamous Letters From the Bastille Archives (Minneapolis: University of Minnesota Press) (2017)
- Le Goût de l'archive/ The Allure of the Archives (1989)
- The vanishing children of Paris: rumor and politics before the French Revolution (1991)
- Dire et mal dire: l'opinion publique au XVIIIe siècle (1992)
- Fragile lives: violence, power and solidarity in eighteenth century Paris (1993)
- Subversive words: public opinion in eighteenth century France (1994)
- Foucault against himself (2015)
- Disorderly families: infamous letters from the Bastille Archives (2016)
