= À l'ami qui ne m'a pas sauvé la vie =

1990 novel by Hervé Guibert

À l'ami qui ne m'a pas sauvé la vie (English: "To the friend who did not save my life") is a novel by Hervé Guibert, first published by Gallimard in 1990. It is a frank portrayal of the physical and psychological suffering caused by AIDS. The book is considered to be a work of autofiction, as although it clearly mimics the last years of Guibert's own life, names are changed and it makes no claim to be truthful to real events.

The novel won the Prix Colette prize in 1990. The publication of the novel landed Guibert an important television interview on the French talk show Apostrophes where he discussed AIDS and his novel. By 1994, 400,000 copies of the novel had been sold. Guibert wrote two sequels: Le Protocole Compassionel and L'homme au chapeau rouge.

== Publication and genre ==
Publication was in 1990, a year before Guibert's death from AIDS-related illness. Its publication publicly revealed Guibert's HIV status and brought him a new level of public attention in France. Julian Lucas wrote in The New Yorker that the book was a "controversial landmark of AIDS literature" and that it shocked France by disclosing Guibert's diagnosis through use of autobiographical fiction.

The book is usually read as a roman à clef and a work of autofiction. It uses recognisable figures from Guibert's own life while altering names and shaping events into a narrative. The character Muzil is widely identified with Michel Foucault, while Marine is recognisable as Isabelle Adjani.

== Overview ==
The story begins by building towards the first-person protagonist's discovery that he has AIDS; realizing this, he monitors his progress, including his physical decline in the grip of the disease. The novel covers three months in the penultimate year of the narrator's life, following the death of his friend Muzil, as he visits doctors, undergoes tests and records the reactions of friends to his illness.

The "friend who does not save his life" is an American named Bill, who tells the narrator that he knows of a scientist who has found a cure for AIDS and can get him into a trial group. The friend, as implied by the title, lets him down. Bill as a pharmaceutical-laboratory manager who offers the narrator false hope and becomes the novel's final portrait of betrayal.

== Bibliography ==
- À l'ami qui ne m'a pas sauvé la vie, Hervé Guibert, Gallimard, 1990, ISBN 2070385035
- To the Friend Who Did Not Save My Life: A Novel by Hervé Guibert, tr. Linda Coverdale, Quartet, November 1991, ISBN 0704302446
