= Mathieu Lindon =

French journalist and writer (born 1955)

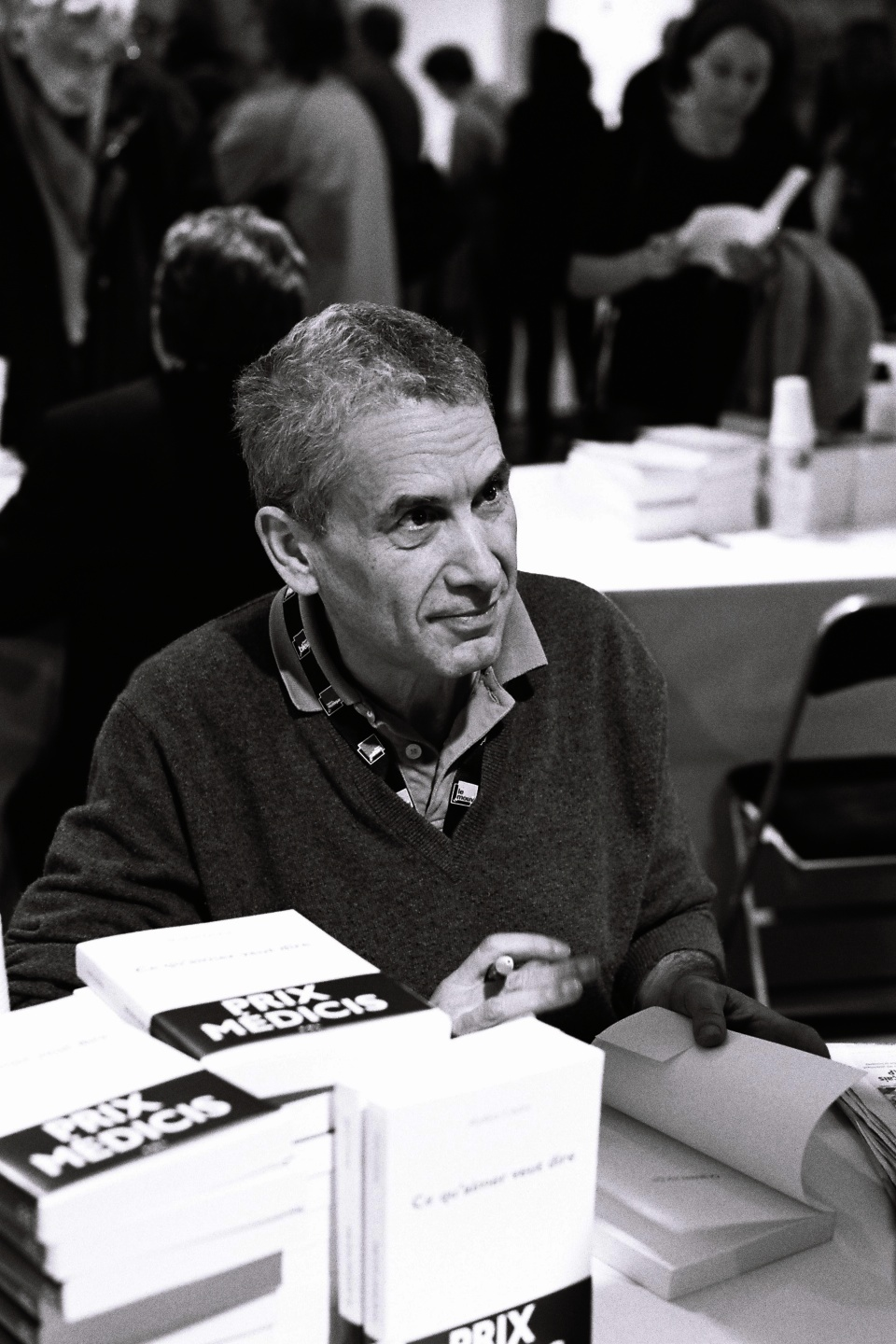
- Lindon at the Radio France book fair in 2011
- Born: 9 August 1955 (age 70); Caen, France
- Occupations: Journalist; Writer
- Parent: Jérôme Lindon
- Relatives: Vincent Lindon (cousin)

Mathieu Lindon (born 9 August 1955) is a French journalist and writer. He is the youngest son of the publisher Jérôme Lindon (who discovered Marguerite Duras and died in 2001), and the first cousin of actor Vincent Lindon. He won the Médicis Prize in 2011.

== Biography ==
Born in Caen, he spent his youth in a wealthy secularized family of Jewish origins with family connections with the Citroën family. His father was a well-known publisher (Éditions de Minuit), highly esteemed by left-wing and New Wave intellectuals. Mathieu Lindon was a close friend of Michel Foucault with whom he lived and spent most of his time between 1978 and 1984, without being his lover. He was also a friend of writer Hervé Guibert with whom he won a scholarship at Villa Medicis in Rome between 1987 and 1989. Hervé Guibert recorded it in L'Incognito, published in 1989.

From the 1980s, Mathieu Lindon has been a journalist at Libération, a left-wing daily. He wrote a pamphlet against Jean-Marie Le Pen in 1998. He is openly gay, and his work often deals with gay themes.

== Bibliography ==
- 1983 : Nos plaisirs, sous le pseudonyme Pierre-Sébastien Heudaux, Minuit
- 1986 : Le Livre de Jim Courage, P.O.L (réed. #formatpoche P.O.L en 2021)
- 1987 : Prince et Léonardours, P.O.L
- 1987 : L'Homme qui vomit, P.O.L
- 1993 : Je t'aime. Récits critiques, Minuit.
- 1994 : Champion du monde, P.O.L
- 1994 : Le Cœur de To, P.O.L
- 1996 : Merci, P.O.L
- 1998 : Les Apeurés, P.O.L
- 1998 : Le Procès de Jean-Marie Le Pen, P.O.L
- 2000 : Chez qui habitons-nous ?, P.O.L
- 2001 : La Littérature, P.O.L
- 2002 : Lâcheté d'Air France, P.O.L
- 2004 : Ma catastrophe adorée, P.O.L
- 2004 : Je vous écris, P.O.L
- 2006 : Ceux qui tiennent debout, P.O.L
- 2008 : Mon Cœur tout seul ne suffit pas, P.O.L
- 2009 : En enfance, P.O.L
- 2011 : Ce qu'aimer veut dire, P.O.L – Prix Médicis 2011.
- 2013 : Une vie pornographique, P.O.L – Prix du Zorba 2013.
- 2014 : Les hommes tremblent, P.O.L
- 2016 : Je ne me souviens pas, P.O.L
- 2018 : Rages de chêne, rages de roseau, P.O.L
- 2020 : Moi, qui que je sois, P.O.L
- 2021 : Hervelino, P.O.L
- 2021 : Vous les autres, P.O.L
- 2023 : Une archive, P.O.L
- 2023 : Il écrit, P.O.L
- 2025 : Le monde comme démangeaison, P.O.L
- 2025 : Christie's, les nazis et moi, P.O.L

== See also ==
- Mathieu Lindon on P.O.L's official site
- David Caron, University of Michigan, Sex and Drugs and Literature, about Ce qu'aimer veut dire
