= Elena Chudinova =

Russian writer (born 1959)

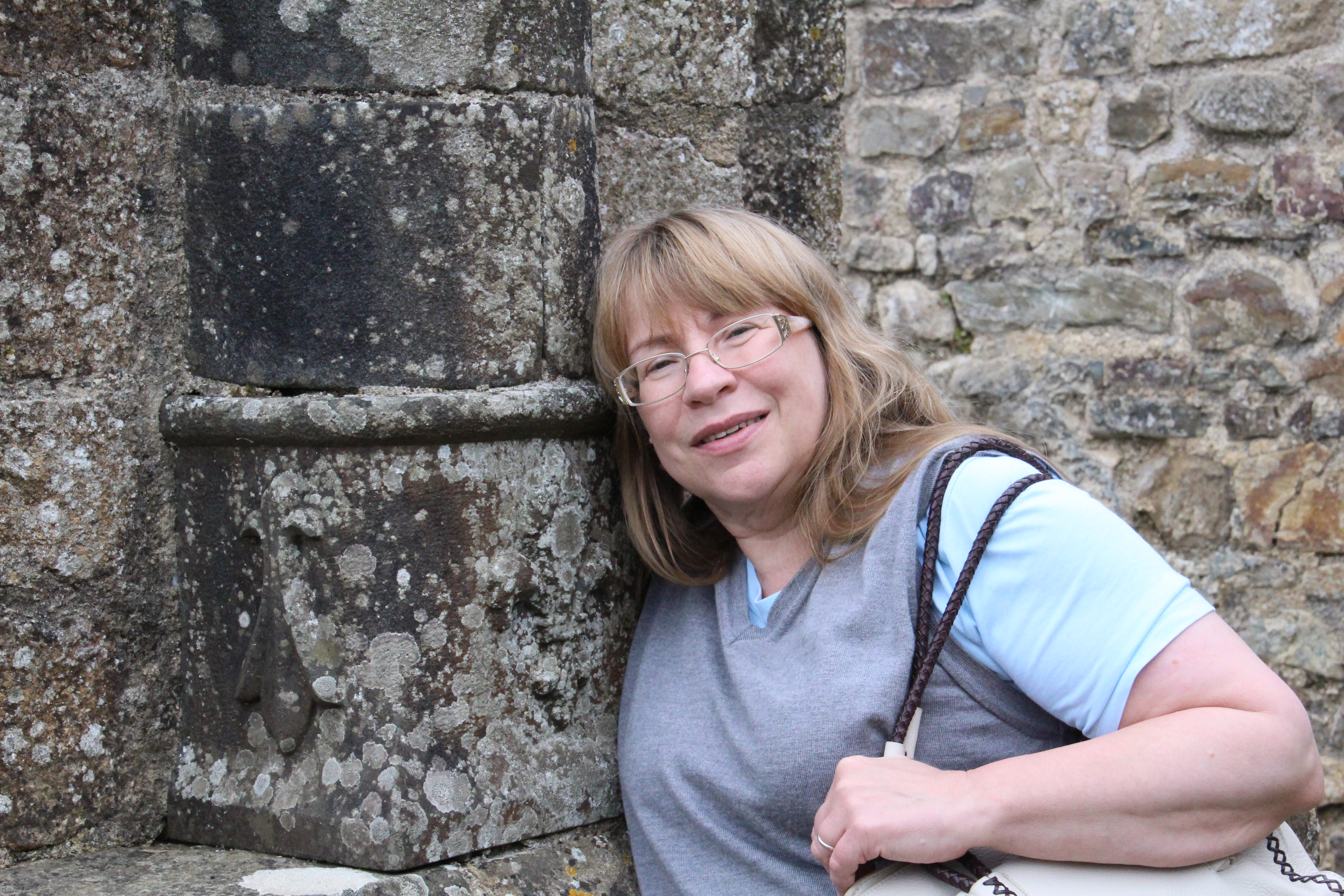
- Born: Elena Petrovna Chudinova; 3 September 1959; Moscow, USSR
- Occupations: Poet, novelist, publicist, broadcaster, playwright
- Relatives: Petr Konstantinovich Chudinov, Inna Ivanovna Chudinova
- Writing career
- Language: Russian, French
- Period: Since 1970
- Genres: Novel, essay, column, poem, drama
- Notable work: The Notre Dame de Paris Mosque

Elena Petrovna Chudinova (Russian: Елена Петровна Чудинова; born 3 September 1959) is a Russian writer, poet, publicist, and playwright.

== Biography ==
Elena Chudinova was born in Moscow in the family of paleontologists Petr Konstantinovich Chudinov and his wife Inna Ivanovna Chudinova. According to her own admission, she started writing Russian history-themed poetry in 1970, but published a small part of it for the first time only in 2013 as an appendix to her novel Keeper of the Sign. Chudinova is the author of the novels Keeper of the Sign, written before the perestroika about the Russian Civil War, Nefert about ancient Egypt, the historical fantasy trilogy about the Saburov Russian-French noble family (Jewelry Box, Fleur-de-lis, and December Without Christmas), children's books A History of England for Children and Gardarika, and the play The Comedy of an Inkwell about the times of Catherine the Great.

Her most famous work is the 2005 dystopian novel The Notre Dame de Paris Mosque, which generated a great deal of worldwide controversy. The novel was awarded the annual Bastkon prize for science fiction in 2006 by the Russian literary group Bastion. The Notre Dame de Paris Mosque was published in France, Serbia, Poland, Bulgaria, and as a pirated version in Turkey. It was also translated into English and Norwegian and is awaiting publication in the United States. The novel was the target of criticism by Muslims and liberals and seized a wide popularity in the conservative circles of France.

As a publicist, Chudinova published four anthologies of articles dealing with politics and culture. She was a columnist for the Russian Expert magazine in 2007-2012. From 2010 to the present, she hosts her own weekly program called Author's Hour on Russian Orthodox Christian Radonezh radio.

== Bibliography ==
- Chudinova, Elena (2005), Мечеть Парижской Богоматери [The Notre Dame de Paris Mosque] (in Russian), Яуза, Эксмо, ISBN 5-699-11167-0. Published in 2005 (two editions), 2006, 2011, 2012.
  - Chudinova, Elena (2006), Богородичина џамија у Паризу [The Notre Dame de Paris Mosque] (in Serbian), translated by Ljubinka Milicevic, Руссика
  - Chudinova, Elena (2009), La Mosquée Notre-Dame de Paris: Annéе 2048 [The Notre Dame de Paris Mosque: 2048] (in French), Paris: Tatamis, ISBN 978-2917617021
  - Chudinova, Elena (2012), Meczet Notre Dame: Rok 2048 [The Notre Dame de Paris Mosque: 2048] (in Polish), Warsaw: Varsovia
  - Chudinova, Elena (2013), Парижката джамия "Св. Богородица": 2048 година [The Notre Dame de Paris Mosque: 2048] (in Bulgarian), Sofia: Велик Архонтски събор
  - Chudinova, Elena (2017), Die Moschee Notre-Dame. Anno 2048. [The Notre Dame de Paris Mosque: 2048] (in German), Leipzig: Renovamen, ISBN 978-3956211287
- Chudinova, Elena (2003), Неферт [Nefert] (in Russian), Авваллон, ISBN 5-94989-012-4
- Chudinova, Elena (2012), Ларец [Jewelry Box] (in Russian), Вече, ISBN 978-5-9533-6337-2. Also published in 2003, 2005, 2006.
- Chudinova, Elena (2012), Лилея [Fleur-de-lis] (in Russian), Вече, ISBN 978-5-9533-6338-9. Also published in 2006 and 2013.
- Chudinova, Elena (2012), Декабрь без Рождества [December Without Christmas] (in Russian), Вече, ISBN 978-5-9533-6339-6
- Chudinova, Elena (2013), Держатель знака, Торжество знака [Keeper of the Sign] (in Russian), Вече
- Chudinova, Elena (2016), Побѣдители [Winners] (in Russian), Вече

== Sources ==
- Eugene Girin and Srdja Trifkovic. The Future of Russia and the West: a Conversation with Elena Chudinova, the Chronicles magazine, April 22, 2014.
- Eugene Girin, Elena Chudinova: Telling the Truth, the Chronicles magazine, May 1, 2014.
- Eugene Girin, Elena Chudinova on the Fall of Europe, the Chronicles magazine, May 28, 2014.
- Elena Chudinova's articles on the Chronicles magazine web site, 2014.
- Eugene Girin, Muslim Terrorism in Paris, Michel Houellebecq's Cowardice, and the Islamization of France: An Interview with Russian writer Elena Choudinova, author of The Notre Dame de Paris Mosque, the Chronicles magazine, January 12, 2015.
