= Bastkon Award =

The Bastkon Awards are annual science fiction literary prizes presented in Russia as part of the Bastkon convention (’‘Басткон’’), a national gathering of science fiction and fantasy writers and fans that began in 2001. The awards recognise notable achievements in Russian speculative fiction and related literary works.2012 Romanian Galileo Awards; Romanian Vladimir Colin Awards; Russian Bastkon Award, Science Fiction Awards Watch, April 18, 2012
