= Edgar Selge =

German actor (born 1948)

- Edgar Selge at the Frankfurt Book Fair 2026
- Born: 27 March 1948 (age 78); Brilon, Germany
- Occupation: Actor
- Years active: 1984–present

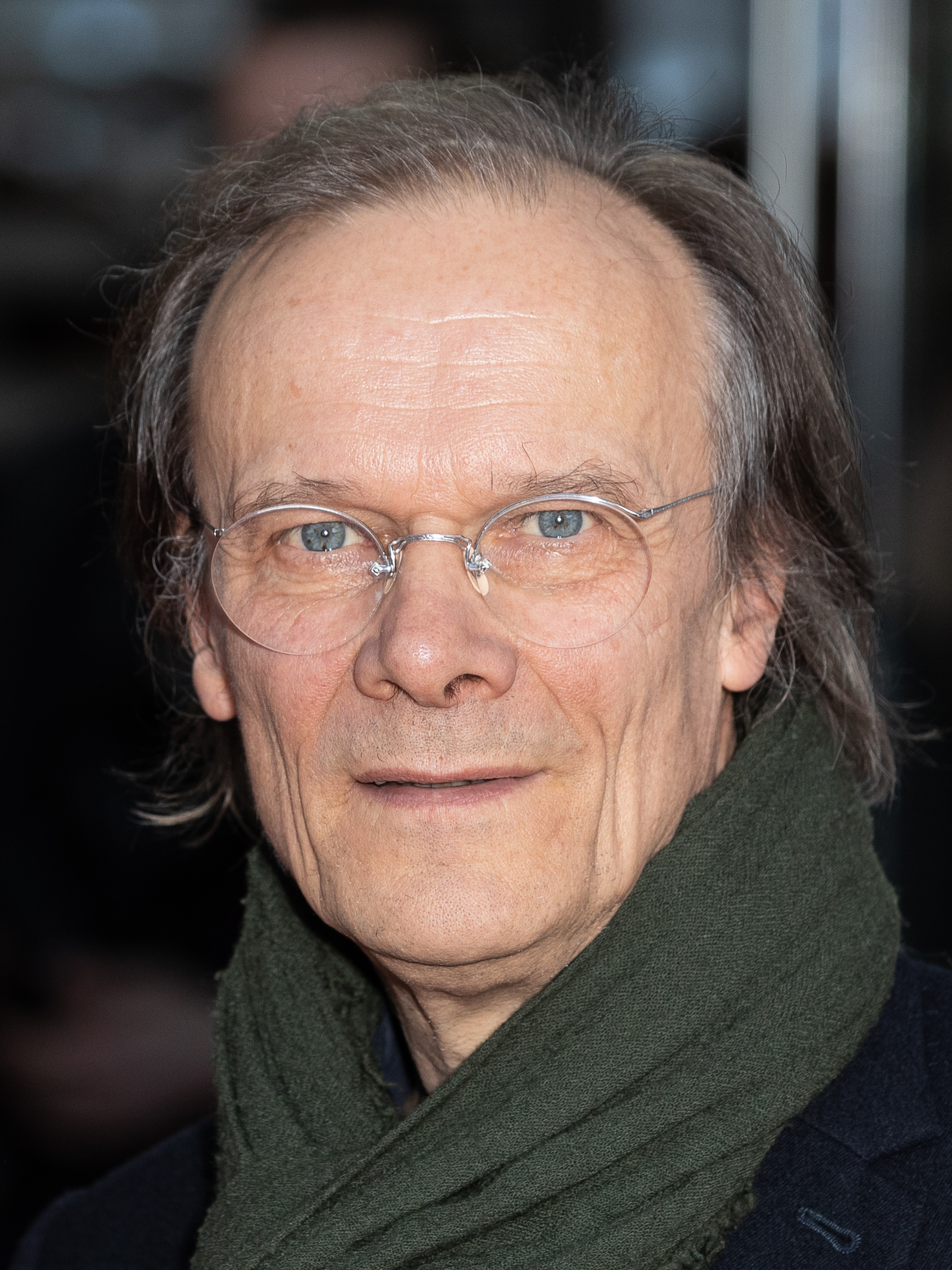
Selge at Berlinale in 2019

Edgar Selge (born 27 March 1948) is a German actor and writer. Selge was born in Brilon in 1948, the son of a prison warden, grew up in Herford. He studied philosophy and German in Munich and Dublin as well as classical piano in Vienna. He graduated in 1975 from the Otto Falckenberg School of the Performing Arts in Munich.

Launched in October 2021, his first book, the autobiographical "Hast du uns endlich gefunden" became a bestseller on the German language book market.

== Selected filmography ==
Film
| Year | Title | Role | Notes |
|---|---|---|---|
| 1986 | Herschel und die Musik der Sterne | Alexander Herschel | TV film |
| 1988 | Schön war die Zeit | Helmut Hartmeyer | |
| 1990 | Der neue Mann | Felix | TV film |
| 1991 | The Terrible Threesome | Werner Hennes | |
| 1992 | Abgetrieben | Block | TV film |
| 1996 | Hamsun | Josef Terboven | |
| 1998 | Kai Rabe gegen die Vatikankiller | Michael Walner | |
| 1999 | Prototype | Janson | TV film |
| 2001 | Das Experiment | Klaus Thon | |
| 2005 | No Sweat | Norbert Reich | |
| 2007 | Fashion Victims | Wolfgang Senker | |
| 2007 | Angsthasen | Adrian Zumbusch | TV film |
| 2007 | The Debt | Max Rainer | |
| 2009 | Die Freundin der Tochter | Paul | TV film |
| 2009 | Beyond the Wall | Ulrich Molitor | TV film |
| 2010 | The Day of the Cat | Nuncio | |
| 2010 | The Lost Father | Arndt Salzbrenner | TV film |
| 2010 | The Poll Diaries | Ebbo von Siering | |
| 2012 | Hanna's Decision | Karl Forster | TV film |
| 2012 | Ludwig II | Richard Wagner | |
| 2013 | Wetlands | Dr. Notz | |
| 2014 | A Blind Hero: The Love of Otto Weidt | Otto Weidt | TV film |
| 2014 | Miss Sixty | Frans Winther | |
| 2014 | The Witness House | Mr. Gärtner | TV film |
| 2015 | Bach in Brazil | Marten Brückling | |
| 2015 | A Grand Farewell | Adrian | TV film |
| 2018 | Unterwerfung | François | TV film |
| 2022 | Honecker und der Pastor | Erich Honecker | TV film |
| 2022 | Skin Deep (Aus meiner Haut) | Stella | |

TV Series
| Year | Title | Role | Notes |
|---|---|---|---|
| 1998–2009 | Polizeiruf 110 | Kommissar Jürgen Tauber | 21 episodes |
| 2000 | Anniversaries | Rohlfs | TV miniseries |
| 2011 | Der Kriminalist | Doc | Episode: Abgetaucht |
