= Jean-Jacques Birgé =

French musician and filmmaker (born 1952)

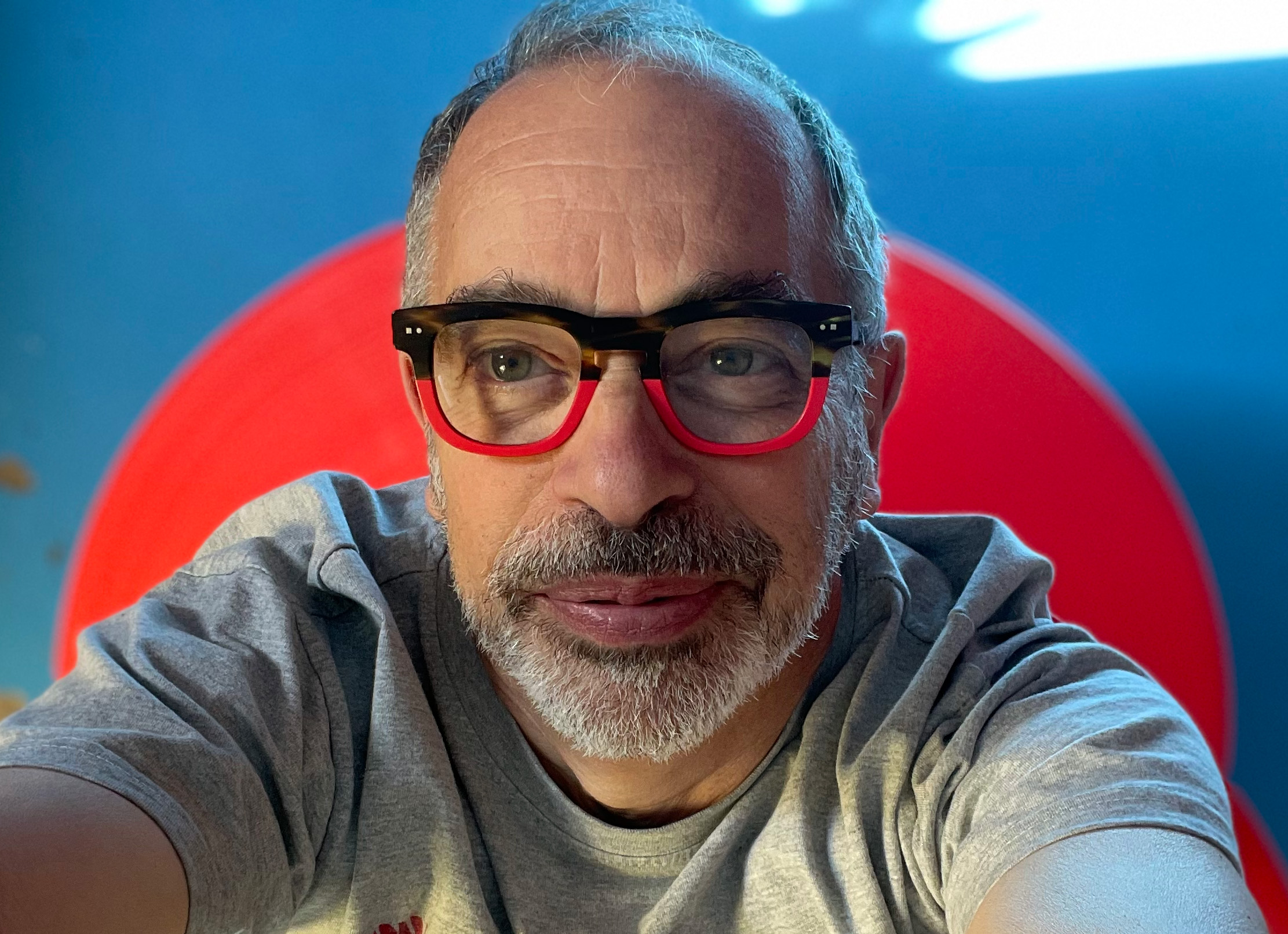

Background information
- Born: 5 November 1952 (age 74)
- Origin: Paris, France
- Genre: avant-garde music
- Occupations: Composer, musician, sound designer, filmmaker, writer
- Instruments: synthesizer, sampler, keyboards, electronics, reed trumpet, flute, jaw harp, Theremin, Tenori-on
- Years active: 1969-2026
- Labels: GRRR, MEG-AIMP, Klang Galerie, Ouch!, Le Souffle Continu, DDD, Wah-Wah, Mio, in situ, Auvidis, publie.net, Les inéditeurs, Psych.org
- Website: http://www.drame.org

Jean-Jacques Birgé (born 5 November 1952) is an independent French musician and filmmaker, at once music composer (co-founder of Un Drame Musical Instantané with which he recorded about 30 albums, as well as for movies, theater, dance, radio), film director (La nuit du phoque, Sarajevo a Street Under Siege, The Sniper), multimedia author (Carton, Machiavel, Alphabet), sound designer (exhibitions, CD-Roms, websites, Nabaztag, etc.), founder of record label GRRR. Specialist of the relations between sound and pictures, he has been an early synthesizer user and with Un Drame Musical Instantané, an initiator of the return of silent movies with live orchestra in 1976. His records show the use of samplers since 1980 and computers since 1985.

Since 1995, Birgé has become a sound designer in all multimedia areas and interactive composition.

Hardly classifiable musically, he may be likened to encyclopaedic composers such as Charles Ives, İlhan Mimaroğlu, Frank Zappa, René Lussier, Francois Sarhan, Jonathan Pontier, André Abujamra, Jim O'Rourke or John Zorn. Birgé's maximalist compositions follow cinematographic syntax more than the laws of harmony and counterpoint.

He has been writing a daily blog since 2005 on Mediapart, with more than 6000 entries so far.

== Biography ==
After his studies at Idhec (Institut des hautes études cinématographiques, now La Fémis), Jean-Jacques Birgé is filled with a passion for images and sounds, and particularly for their potential to produce sense and create emotions. Birgé considers sound as a counterpoint to pictures and dialogue, an off-stage landscape and a wide opened window to imagination.

In 1975 he founded the record label GRRR (Defense de features on the famous Nurse with Wound list) and in 1976 the group Un Drame Musical Instantané (with Bernard Vitet and Francis Gorgé. He composed for movies (I. Barrère, D. Belloir, D. Cabrera, P. Desgraupes, P. O. Lévy, P. Morize, F. Reichenbach, F. Romand, Jacques Rouxel, R. Sangla, M. Trillat, la Cinémathèque Albert Kahn...), dance (J. Gaudin, Karine Saporta...), photography (Arles), theater, radio, and records about 30 albums. On stage, he plays live to silent movies (26 since 1976) as well as improvising or producing multimedia shows. For "Le K" with Richard Bohringer he was nominated at the 9èmes Victoires de la Musique.

As a moviemaker, 20 years after La nuit du phoque (issued on DVD with the reissue of the cult-record défense de), he directed Vis à vis : Idir et Johnny Clegg a capella. He received a BAFTA and the Jury Award in Locarno 1994 collectively for Sarajevo: a street under siege, and his short Le sniper was shown in more than 1000 theatres.

A specialist for realtime synthesis music instruments, he has always lived among new technologies which offer the possibility of conceiving strange and iconoclast objects. Simultaneously to his work as a sound designer for exhibitions-shows (Il était une fois la fête foraine, The Extraordinary Museum, The Laying of the Hands, Passerelle, Le Siècle Métro, Jours de Cirque, L'argent, Révélations, Monuments aux morts, Carambolages, French Pavilion Aïchi World Fair...), websites (BDDP-TBWA, Laurent-Perrier, Ville de Lyon, Compagnie Générale des Eaux, Rencontres Numer, Determinism, Else, Virtools, Adidas, Ptits reperes, Museum National d'Histoire Naturelle, Musée de l'Immigration...), and CD-Roms (At the Circus with Seurat, Fenêtre sur l'Art, Europrix 98, AZ, Firmenich, Le DVD-Rom du Louvre, Le Grand Jeu, Sethi et la couronne d'Egypte, Mr. Men series, 9 Cahiers Passeport, 4 Salto & Zelia, Domicile d'Ange Heureux...), he asserted himself as a multimedia author with Carton (Enhanced-CD where an original game refers to each song), Machiavel (interactive video scratch of 111 loops, with Antoine Schmitt), and Alphabet, created with Frédéric Durieu and Murielle Lefèvre from Kveta Pacovska's book for children (Grand Prix Möbius International 2000, Prix Multimédia de la SACD 2000, Coup de coeur Trophées SVM Mac, Prix de la meilleure adaptation au Festival de Bologne en Italie, La Mention Spéciale au Salon du Livre de Jeunesse à Montreuil, First Prize CineKid en Hollande, GigaMaus en Allemagne, First Prize Package MMCA au Japon, et aux USA : Oppenheim Toy Portfolio Platinum Award 2002, Parents’ Choice Silver Honor 2001, Discovery.com Award of Excellence 2001, Software Magic Award Parenting Magazine 2001, Children's Software Review All Star Award 2001, Choosing Children's Software Best Pick 2001, Best Software Pick Edutaining Kids.com 2001).

With this CD-Rom he inaugurated a new direction of work based generative action and interactivity which lets the player discover a new interpretation each time (on-line et off-line). He collaborates on the creation of sites lecielestbleu (with F.Durieu) and flyingpuppet.com (with Nicolas Clauss). For lecielestbleu.com he received the Prix SCAM 2002 of the Best Internet Site meilleur site and the NarrowCast Content Award 2002 ... For Ulchiro on flyingpuppet.com he received the Prix du Centre Pompidou FlashFestival 2002 ... Somnambules, together with Nicolas Clauss and Didier Silhol, won the Special Prize of Jury Senef 2003 (Seoul Net Festival), Prix de la Création Nouveaux Médias 2004 (Vidéoformes), 1st Prix France Telecom R&D Oone (Art Rock Festival), Prix SACD de la Création Interactive 2004, Prix ARS Electronica Net Vision / Net Excellence Honorary Mention 2004 (Austria) and is nominated among the 5 strangest sites at Yahoo! Best of 10 Years. Boum! (Les inéditeurs) gets Fiction Award – Special Mention at BolognaRagazzi Digital Award 2016.

Besides his daily blog, Birgé writes in many magazines and teaches the relation between sound and pictures. In 2024, he signs a foreword of the book Twilight of the Alchemists by Steven and Alan Freeman, and in 2025 another one for the book Synths, Sax and Situationists by Ian Thompson.

He designed the sound of Nabaztag, the smart rabbit. His last artworks are Les Portes (Doors, interactive video installation with Nicolas Clauss) and Nabaz'mob (opera for 100 smart rabbits with Antoine Schmitt for which they receive Ars Electronica Award of Distinction Digital Musics 2009). After CD Etablissement d'un ciel d'alternance, a duo with writer Michel Houellebecq, he produces dozens of online albums. He currently plays with Amandine Casadamont (turntables), Vincent Segal (cello), Antonin-Tri Hoang (alto sax, bass clarinet), Sacha Gattino (misc.)... One of his last show uses the famous Oblique Strategies game of cards with musicians such as Médéric Collignon, Julien Desprez, Pascal Contet and many others. His last participations to exhibitions feratured Musée du Louvre (2015), Grand Palais, Panthéon and Palais de Tokyo (2016), Cité des Sciences et de l'Industrie (2016–2018)...

In 2018, he plays at the closing of La Maison Rouge with Vincent Segal, Antonin-Tri Hoang and Mexican artist Daniela Franco. And he produces the CD The 100th Anniversary of Jean-Jacques Birgé (1952-2052). In 2020, the CD Perspectives for the 22nd Century follows this utopian path. In 2021, he recorded Fictions LP with saxophonist Lionel Martin, and in 2022 he reformed Un Drame Musical Instantané with Francis Gorgé and writer Dominique Meens. In 2020 and 2023 the 3 CDs Pique-nique au labo features 48 guests. In 2024, Apéro Labo are live concerts at Studio GRRR, and Animal Opera is Birgé's first CD without any human musician! In 2026, double CD Les déments with Denis Lavant and Lionel Martin gets a Coup de cœur by Académie Charles Cros.

== Works ==
=== Records ===
- Intervention au milieu d'une prière en miettes, (SP Psych.KG, 2022), 1972
- Avant toute, Birgé-Gorgé (Le souffle continu), 1974–75
- Défense de, Birgé-Gorgé-Shiroc (GRRR), 1975 - CD reissue Mio, 2004 - LP reissue Wah-Wah, 2013
- Très toxique, Un d.m.i. (GRRR / also on Toxic Rice, Psych.KG, D) 1976 (issued 2023)
- Trop d'adrénaline nuit, Un d.m.i. (GRRR), 1977 - CD reissue GRRR, 2001
- Rideau !, Un d.m.i. (GRRR), 1980 - CD reissue KlangGalerie, 2017
- À travail égal salaire égal, Un d.m.i. (GRRR), 1981-82 - CD reissue KlangGalerie, 2018
- Musical direction of Éditions Ducaté, cassettes recorded with Jane Birkin, Annie Girardot, Annie Ernaux, Ludmila Mikaël... 1981–82
- Les bons contes font les bons amis, Un d.m.i. (GRRR), 1983 - CD reissue KlangGalerie, 2022
- L'homme à la caméra, Un d.m.i. (GRRR), 1984 - CD reissue KlangGalerie, 2020
- Carnage, Un d.m.i. (GRRR), 1985 - CD reissue Klanggalerie, 2021
- L'hallali, Un d.m.i. (GRRR), 1987
- Sous les mers, Un d.m.i. (GRRR), 1988
- Qui vive ?, Un d.m.i. (GRRR), 1989
- Le K, Un d.m.i. with Richard Bohringer on Dino Buzzati (GRRR + réédition Auvidis), Nomination at the 9th Victoires de la Musique, 1990–93
- Jeune fille qui tombe... tombe, Un d.m.i. (In Situ), 1991
- Kind Lieder, Un d.m.i. (GRRR), 1991
- Urgent Meeting, Un d.m.i. (GRRR/No Man's land) with Colette Magny, Louis Sclavis, Vinko Globokar, Michel Godard, François Tusques, Didier Malherbe, Yves Robert, Denis Colin..., 1991
- Opération Blow Up, Un d.m.i. (GRRR) with Brigitte Fontaine, Henri Texier, Valentin Clastrier, Carlos Zingaro, Joëlle Léandre, René Lussier, Luc Ferrari..., 1992
- Crasse-Tignasse, Un d.m.i. (Auvidis), 1993
- Sarajevo Suite, production + compositions by Un d.m.i. played by Dee Dee Bridgewater and Balanescu Quartet (L’empreinte digitale),1994
- Il était une fois la Fête Foraine, Un d.m.i. (Auvidis), 1995
- Haut-Karabagh : Musiques du Front, production (Auvidis),1995
- Direction record collection “Musiques d’ambiance” at Auvidis : Policier, Western, Science-Fiction, 3 CD with Francis Gorgé, 1995
- Le Sens du combat, Michel Houellebecq (Radio France), 1996
- Carton, Birgé-Vitet (GRRR), 1997
- Au fil du temps, Birgé-Vitet (CD in catalogue of the exhibition), 1997
- Machiavel, Un d.m.i. (GRRR), 1998 with Steve Argüelles, Benoît Delbecq, DJ Nem, Philippe Deschepper...
- Un petit tour, Aki Onda (All Access, Japon), 1999
- Trop d’adranaline nuit, Un d.m.i. (reissue + bonus, GRRR), 2001
- Défense de, Birgé Gorgé Shiroc (reissue CD + DVD 6 hours of unissued music & Film "La nuit du phoque", MIO), 2003
- Birgé alone : Inanga (in CMG#6 Ailleurs, 1999), Young Dynamite (in TraceLabel, 2005), Plomberie, Hantée and Roll Over Composer (in Nouveaux Dossiers de l'Audiovisuel n°3, INA, 2005)...
- Script, dialogues and hörspiel Radio Chronatoscaphe (in 25th anniv. of label nato 3 cd Le Chronatoscaphe), 2005
- Les Actualités, conception and realization of double-album + Un d.m.i. with Baco (Les Allumés du Jazz), 2006
- Établissement d'un ciel d'alternance, Houellebecq-Birgé (GRRR), 2007
- C'est le bouquet, Un d.m.i. (unissued CD to be downloaded with Sextant magazine, GRRR), 2007
- Participation to Thisness by Jef Lee Johnson (nato, 2005), Toukouleur Orchestra's album (2013), Carving Songs by Controlled Bleeding (2017), Aux Ronds-Points des Allumés du Jazz (2019)
- Many other recordings in England, Italy, Switzerland, Portugal, Austria, Germany, Japan, USA...
- 106 unissued albums, 206 hours of music and 1729 pieces are online, free to listen and download on drame.org, with Un Drame Musical Instantané, Bernard Vitet, Michael Lonsdale, Daniel Laloux, Frank Royon Le Mée, Colette Magny, Thurston Moore, Michel Houellebecq, Vincent Segal, Antonin-Tri Hoang, Edward Perraud, Sacha Gattino, Birgitte Lyregaard, Linda Edsjö, Alexandra Grimal, Joce Mienniel, Sylvain Kassap, Fanny Lasfargues, Ravi Shardja, Yuko Oshima, Eve Risser, Nicolas Clauss, Pascale Labbé, Didier Petit, Étienne Brunet, Éric Échampard, Dominique Meens, Hélène Sage, Hélène Labarrière, Bass Clef, Médéric Collignon, Julien Desprez, Sophie Bernado, Bumcello, Sylvain Lemêtre, Sylvain Rifflet, Amandine Casadamont, Mathias Lévy, Élise Dabrowski, Wassim Halal, Hasse Poulsen, Christelle Séry, Jonathan Pontier, Jean-François Vrod, Karsten Hochapfel, Nicholas Christenson, Jean-Brice Godet, Naïssam Jalal, Fidel Fourneyron, Élise Caron, Lionel Martin, Basile Naudet, Gilles Coronado, Philippe Deschepper, François Corneloup, Uriel Barthélémi, Hélène Breschand, Gwennaëlle Roulleau, Fabiana Striffler, Csaba Palotaï, Sophie Agnel, David Fenech, Olivier Lété, Fanny Meteier, Violaine Lochu, Tatiana Paris, Emmanuelle Legros, Matthieu Donarier, Hélène Duret, Rafaelle Rinaudo, Maëlle Desbrosses, Isabel Sörling, Léa Ciechelski, Alexandre Saada, Catherine Delaunay, Roberto Negro, François Jeanneau, Paolo Rezze, etc., 1965-2026
- Long Time No Sea, El Strøm (GRRR), 2017
- Jean-Jacques Birgé & Hélène Sage, Rendez-vous (KlangGalerie), 2018 (rec. 1981)
- The 100th Anniversary, Jean-Jacques Birgé (GRRR), 2018
- Perspectives for the 22nd Century (MEG-AIMP), 2020
- Pique-nique au labo with 28 soloists (2CD, GRRR), 2020
- Plumes et poils, Un d.m.i. (GRRR), 2022
- Fictions with Lionel Martin (LP Ouch!), 2022
- FLUXUS +/- with Francis Gorgé, Mama Baer (Psych.KG (D)), 2022
- FLUXUS +/- with Kommissar Hjuler (Psych.KG (D)), 2022
- +/-dru_M?flux with Gerhard Laber, Kommissar Hjuler (Psych.KG (D)), 2022
- Toxic Rice, Un d.m.i. with Kommissar Hjuler (Psych.KG (D)), 2023
- Pique-nique au labo 3 with 20 new soloists (GRRR), 2023
- TCHAK, Un d.m.i. (KlangGalerie), 2024 (rec. 2000)
- Animal Opera (GRRR), 2024
- Les déments with Denis Lavant and Lionel Martin (GRRR-Ouch!), Grand Prix de l'Académie Charles Cros, 2025
- A Silhouette And A Thumbtack (Dance in Hyperspace) in Rock 'n Roll Station (Redux Extraction) by Nurse With Wound (United Dirter), 2026
- Sidney Bechet (Ouch!) with Lionel Martin, 2026

=== Films ===
==== Directing ====
- La Nuit du Phoque, Award at Belfort Festival, 1974 (DVD)
- Remember My Forgotten Man, video-paluche, 1976
- Idir-Johnny Clegg a capella (Vis à Vis, Point du Jour), 1993
- Collective realisation of Sarajevo: A Street Under Siege (Point du Jour-Saga), 1993, British Academy Award of Film & TV Arts (Bafta) and Locarno Film Festival Jury Award
- Le Sniper on YouTube, text by Ademir Kenović, first fiction filmed in Sarajevo during the siege, shown in more than 1000 cinemas in France and abroad, 1994
- On Boat with Françoise Romand, 2008
- Short movies for digital novel "USA 1968 deux enfants", 2014
- Perspectives For The 22nd Century, co-directed with Nicolas Clauss, Sonia Cruchon, Valéry Faidherbe, Jacques Perconte, John Sanborn, Eric Vernhes, 2020

==== Music for films ====
- films directed by Patrick Barbéris, Luc Barnier, Igor Barrère et Etienne Lalou, Dominique Belloir, Dominique Cabréra, Sonia Cruchon, Corine Dardé, Pierre Desgraupes, Tom Drahos, Serge Duval, Valéry Faidherbe, Stéphane Frattini, Christophe Gans, Richard Hamon, Philippe Kotlarsky, Michèle Larue, Noël Burch, Nicolas Le Du, Pierre-Oscar Lévy, Bernard Mallaterre, Mathilde Morières, Pierre Morize, Natacha Nisic, Jacques Perconte, François Reichenbach, Françoise Romand, Jacques Rouxel, John Sanborn, Raoul Sangla, Miroslav Sebestik, Richard Ugolini, Daniel Verdier, Michaëla Watteaux, Cité des Sciences de La Villette, Cinémathèque Albert Kahn, Platform, Les inéditeurs, Drac IdF... 1973–2025

=== Exhibitions ===
- Music for Andy Warhol Exhibition Opening (Paris Modern Art Museum), 1971
- Music for Michel Potage Exhibition Opening (Paris), 1978
- La rue, la musique et nous (Arcueil), 1979
- Sound design of the Parc della Rimembranza (Napoli, Italy), 1981
- Economia : La Saga des Millar, sound design and music; réal. Michel Séméniako (Cité des Sciences et de l'Industrie), 1986–1987
- Femmes en vue, musique (Le Mois de la Photo, Palais de Tokyo), 1988
- Il était une fois la Fête Foraine, sound design. Music with Bernard Vitet; Raymond Sarti (Grande halle de la Villette), 1995
- Puppets, sound design (Fine Arts Institute of San Francisco, USA), 1996
- Electra, music and sound design “Théâtre d’objets”; R. Sarti (Cité des Enfants, Cité des Sciences), 1996
- The Extraordinary Museum (Kumamoto, Japon) et Euro Fantasia (Nagoya Dome, Japon), sound design. Music with Bernard Vitet; R. Sarti, 1997
- Au Fil du Temps, music with Bernard Vitet (Corbeil-Essonnes), 1998
- Museum National d’Histoire Naturelle, sound design (Hyptique). 1998
- Le Siècle Métro, sound design, and music with Denis Colin; Michal Batory (Maison de la RATP, Paris), 2000
- Pass, symphony for 26 iMacs, with A. Denize, E.Mineur, F.Durieu (Pass, Mons, Belgium), 2000
- The Laying of the hands, sound design and interactive music, with Mark Madel (Amsterdam Hospital), 2001
- Festival de la Ville (urban forum Créteil), 2001
- Jours de cirque, music with Bernard Vitet, sound design; R. Sarti (Grimaldi Forum, Monaco), 2002
- Juno Beach, music and sound design (Musée du Débarquement, Omaha Beach), 2003
- L'argent, music and sound design (Pass, Mons, Belgium), 2003
- Music for 5 sculptures of the Museum: St Phalle, Calder, Oldenburg, Martin, Scurti (D.A.E.P. Centre Pompidou), 2003
- Zoo, interactive installation with lecielestbleu. House of Tomorrow (Melbourne, Australia) / Museum of the Future (Ars Electronica, Austria) / Mérignac, 2003–2010
- Time, interactive installation with lecielestbleu. Interactive Design (Centre Pompidou) / Somewhere Totally Else + History of the Modern Design (London, Great Bretain), Game Time (Melbourne, Australia), 2003–2004
- Alphabet, interactive installation (My Name is Game, Gana Art Gallery, Seoul, Korea), 2004
- La Pâte à Son, interactive installation with lecielestbleu. Centre Pompidou (Atelier des Enfants) / Museum of the Future (Ars Electronica, Austria) / IFCA (Slovenia) / OFFF Festival (Barcelona, Spain) / Festival du Film d'Animation d'Annecy / and 4 exhibitions in Korea : Uijeongbu Digital Arts Festival, SeNef, Ten Years After 3 (Daejeon), Digital! (Samsung Tesco Gallery, Ten Years After 3, Seoul), Mérignac, 2004–2010
- Anémone, octophonic music in motion, Dassault Systèmes (Aïchi World Fair, Japan), 2005
- Le Sniper, video installation (Soft Target, Utrecht, Nederland), 2005
- Musée du Quai Branly, sound design (Multimedi'Art Interactif d'or Fiamp.2006), 2005
- Musée de la Vendée, sound design, 2006
- Somnambules, interactive installation with Nicolas Clauss. Museum of the Future, Ars Electronica (Austria) / Stuttgart Film (Germany) / La Villette Numérique, Forum des Images-Nemo, Rur@rt & Ars Numerica (France) / Microwave (Hong Kong) / Japan Media Arts (Tokyo) / Mad'O3, MAEM & Confluencias (Spain) / São Paulo (Brazil) / Biennale Internationale de Media Art (Dual Reality, Seoul, Korea), 2004–2006
- Overture of Danse avec les Robots, quadraphonic music (Futuroscope, Poitiers), 2006
- Les Portes, interactive video installation with Nicolas Clauss (Festival Nemo, Espace Paul Ricard), 2006
- Nabaz'mob, opera pour 100 smart rabbits, installation with Antoine Schmitt, Wired NextFest (New York), Luminato (Toronto), Des souris et des hommes (Carré des Jalles), Musiques en Jouets (Musée des Arts Décoratifs, Paris), Ososphère (L'Aubette 1928, Strasbourg), Access (Pau), Abbaye de L'Escaladieu (Tarbes), EuraTechnologies (Lille), Musée Départemental de l'Oise (Beauvais), Parizone@Dream (La Gaîté Lyrique, Paris), ENSAD (Paris), 2006–2013
- Peugeot RCZ (IAA, Frankfurt, Germany), 2009
- St Gobain glass folding screen (Quantum!, Paris, France), 2009
- Concert-visit of Vinyl with Vincent Segal (La Maison Rouge, Paris, France), 2010
- Revelations, a digital odyssey through paintings, artistic direction and music for 23 short films directed by Pierre Oscar Lévy (Petit Palais, Paris), 2010. Hangaram Museum, Seoul Art Center, Korea, 2013. Grand Prix Stratégies 2010, Prix des Étudiants, Prix Produit Grand Public
- Swedenborg's Room with Birgitte Lyregaard and Linda Edsjö (MAMC Strasbourg), 2012
- Video Game, sound design with Sacha Gattino (Cité des Sciences et de l'Industrie), 2013–2014
- Monuments to the Dead, soundscape for 15 loudspeakers, exhibition under the guidance of Raymond Depardon (Rencontres d'Arles & Panthéon), 2014–2016.
- Une brève histoire de l'avenir, sound creation (Suricog, Le Louvre), 2015
- Darwin, l'original, sound design with Sacha Gattino (Cité des Sciences et de l'Industrie), 2015–2016
- Carambolages, musical visit (Grand Palais), 2016
- Rester vivant, poetic juke-box with Michel Houellebecq (Palais de Tokyo), 2016
- Special Effects, Steal The Scene!, sound design and music with Sacha Gattino (Cité des Sciences et de l'Industrie), 2017–2018
- Melting Rust with Anne-Sarah Le Meur, Utopian Cities Programmed Societies (Fabrica de Pensule, Cluj, Romania), 2019
- Omni-Vermille with Anne-Sarah Le Meur, ZKM Center for Art and Media Karlsruhe (Germany), 2020
- L'opéra cassé with Romina Shama (Musée Transitoire, Genève, Switzerland), 2021
- The Theatre of Apparitions with Roger Ballen (pavilion of South Africa, Venice Biennale, Italy), 2022

=== Live shows ===
==== With UN D.M.I. ====
- Long series of Poisons, 1976–79
- Ciné-concerts (with 24 silent movies), 1977–99
- Rideau!, 1980
- Pieces for a 15-piece orchestra, 1981–1986
- Le trou, from Edgar Allan Poe, 1982
- Music for fire organ and orchestra (instruments built by Vitet), 1983
- Live with Los Angeles Olympic Games (Festival d'Avignon), 1984
- La Bourse et la vie (Nouvel Orchestre Philharmonique de Radio France, dir.Yves Prin), 1984
- 45 secondes départ arrêté & Fééries Jacobines (fireworks), 1984–85
- Music for ballet by Jean Gaudin (Ecarlate), Karine Saporta (Manèges, Le Coeur Métamorphosé), Lulla Card... 1985–1989
- Jeune fille qui tombe... tombe by Dino Buzzati (spoken oratorio, Michael Lonsdale / Daniel Laloux), 1985–90
- Le K de Dino Buzzati (spoken oratorio, M.Lonsdale / Richard Bohringer - D.Laloux; R.Sarti), 1985-92
- La Fosse (opéra-bouffe, Martine Viard, Louis Hagen-William, Ensemble de l'Itinéraire), 1987
- Le Chateau des Carpathes, from Jules Verne (burning cantata, Frank Royon Le Mée), 1987
- 20 000 lieues sous mers (show of illusions and imaginary museum on 2 boats, La Péniche Opéra), 1988
- Zappeurs-Pompiers 1 & 2 (live zapping on a huge screen, L.Card, Éric Houzelot / Guy Pannequin), 1987–89
- J'accuse by Émile Zola (Richard Bohringer, D.Fonfrède, Ahmed Madani, 70 musicians, dir.Jean-Luc Fillon; Raymond Sarti), 1989
- Contrefaçons (for brass orchestra, dir. J-L. Fillon), 1989
- Kind Lieder (nine songs which hurt), 1991
- Let my children hear music from Charlie Mingus, 1992
- Crasse-Tignasse (nine songs for children), 1993–94
- Machiavel (techno dance with interactive images), 1999–2000
- Resurrection (sextet), 2014
- Under The Channel (trio), 2024

==== Other Live Shows ====
- Concerts with Epimanondas, Birgé Gorgé Shiroc, Red Noise, Dagon, George Harrison, Lard Free, Cesare Massaranti and Oliver Johnson, Opération Rhino, la Compagnie Lubat... 1969–1979
- Opening of the Mois de la Francophonie with André Dussollier and Bernard-Pierre Donnadieu, 1992
- Sarajevo suite, scenery, with Claude Piéplu, P. Charial, B. Vitet, Henri Texier Quintet, Lindsay Cooper Sextet, Kate and Mike Westbrook, Chris Biscoe and Bălănescu String Quartet,1994
- Le sens du combat with Martine Viard and Michel Houellebecq, 1996
- Établissement d’un ciel d’alternance, duo with Michel Houellebecq, created for 10th Anniversary of Inrockuptibles at Fondation Cartier, 1996
- Dans la lumière et dans la force, hommage to poet André Velter, with Michael Lonsdale, Denise Gence, Elise Caron, Bernard-Pierre Donnadieu, 1996
- 10th anniversary of Bar Floréal, Maison Européenne de la Photographie, 1996
- À l’écoute et Djoutche, hommage to Colette Magny, with Bernard Vitet, 1997
- Birgé Hôtel, improvisations on texts by and with Alain Monvoisin, Michel Houellebecq, 1998
- Touché !, Theremin solo, with projections by Murielle Lefèvre, 2000
- La kabine electroniq, with Léo and Etienne Brunet, 2001
- (se) diriger dans l’incertain, convention de l’APM avec Denis Colin et Didier Petit, Pyramide du Louvre, 2002
- Quartet with Yves Dormoy, Antoine Berjeaut and Pablo Cueco, 2002
- Solo with experimental silent movies, Ménagerie de Verre, 2003
- The Biggest Drum & Bass Jam Ever Made, Batofar, 2003
- Sarajevo Suite et Fin, with Nicolas Clauss and Pascale Labbé, 2003
- Musical director for the Evenings of Rencontres d’Arles de la Photographie (soundtracks + live shows with Elise Caron, Denis Colin, Philippe Deschepper, Eric Échampard, Didier Petit, Bernard Vitet, Ève Risser, Antonin-Tri Hoang, Linda Edsjö), 2002–2005, 2011–2015
- Somnambules, with N. Clauss, P. Labbé and D. Petit, 2006
- Création sonore de Une Médée, mise en scène d'Anne-Laure Liégeois (Le Festin, Montluçon), 2006
- Hommage à - Moondog - A Tribute by, solo, 2006
- Électrofication with music students (Jazz 93), and Somnambules with Nicolas Clauss, Étienne Brunet and Éric Échampard (Le Triton, Les Lilas), 2007
- Nabaz'mob, opera for 100 smart rabbits, with Antoine Schmitt, Web Flash Festival (Centre Pompidou) / Wired NextFest (New York) / Scopitone (Nantes) / Nuit Blanche (Amiens) / Recalling RFID (Amsterdam), Le Cube, Nuit Blanche (Paris), Musiques Libres (Besançon), SIANA (Évry), Des souris et des hommes (St Médard-en-Jalles), Robotix's (PASS, Mons, Belgique), Entre chien et loup (Quimper), Nuit Blanche (Metz), Nissan Cube Store (London & Paris), Rokolectiv (Bucarest, Romania), ICT (Belgium), Meta.morf (Norway), Lab30 (Germany), Gateways/Kumu (Estonia), Orléanoïde (Orléans), 2006-2014 Ars Electronica Award of Distinction Digital Musics
- Trio with Eve Risser and Yuko Oshima (Donkey Monkey) on YouTube, 2008
- Duo with Nicolas Clauss, 2008
- Mascarade with Antoine Schmitt, 2010
- Duo with Vincent Segal, 2010–2011
- Duo with Antonin-Tri Hoang (guest: Lucien Alfonso), 2011–2012
- El Strøm, with Birgitte Lyregaard and Sacha Gattino, 2011–2012
- La chambre de Swedenborg with Birgitte Lyregaard and Linda Edsjö, 2012
- Le grand réinventaire with Ève Risser and Antonin-Tri Hoang, 2012
- Revue de presse with Jacques Rebotier, 2012
- Dodécadanse with Claudia Triozzi, Sandrine Maisonneuve, Vincent Segal, 2012
- Power Symphony, music for Prix Pictet, 2012
- Trio with Vincent Segal, Antonin-Tri Hoang, Edward Perraud, 2012–2013
- Dépaysages, trio with Jacques Perconte, 2012–2013
- Audiovisual performance with Nicolas Clauss and Sylvain Kassap, 2013
- Freed at La Java with Jorge Velez, Bass Clef, 2013–2014
- Dreams and Nightmares with Alexandra Grimal, Antonin-Tri Hoang, Fanny Lasfargues, Edward Perraud, 2014
- Un coup de dés jamais n'abolira le hasard with Birgitte Lyregaard, Linda Edsjö, Médéric Collignon, Julien Desprez, Antonin-Tri Hoang, Pascal Contet, 2014–2015
- Tribute to Jacques Thollot with Fantazio, Antonin-Tri Hoang, 2015
- Tribute to Jean Morières, 2015
- Entrechats with Bumcello, 2016
- Avant toute with Francis Gorgé, 2016
- Harpon with Amandine Casadamont, 2016
- Défauts de prononciation with Sophie Bernado, Linda Edsjö, 2017
- L'isthme des ismes with Antonin-Tri Hoang, Samuel Ber, 2017
- Face B on Dailymotion with Daniela Franco, Vincent Segal, Antonin-Tri Hoang, 2018
- OSO with Laurent Stoutzer, David Coignard, 2019
- Melting Rust with Anne-Sarah Le Meur on YouTube, 2019–2020
- NONSELVES with John Sanborn on YouTube, 2019
- Saute-mouton #4 with Élise Dabrowski, Mathias Lévy, Lionel Martin, Gwennaëlle Roulleau, 2023
- Apéro Labo with Antonin-Tri Hoang, Mathias Lévy, Maëlle Desbrosses, Fanny Meteier, Léa Ciechelsky, Fabiana Striffler, Hélène Duret, Alexandre Saada, and dancers Didier Silhol, Cléo Laigret, 2024
- Radio Phony, p-node on the air, 2024
- After 2152 with Amandine Casadamont, 2024

=== CD-ROMs to iPad apps ===
- At the Circus with Seurat, music and sound design (Réunion des Musées Nationaux - Gallimard - Hyptique), 1996
- Carton, CD-Extra by Birgé-Vitet with photographer Michel Séméniako and Hyptique (GRRR), 1997
- Fenêtre sur l'Art, sound design (Réunion des Musées Nationaux-Vilo-Hyptique), 1998
- Machiavel, CD Audio/Rom of Un d.m.i. featuring an interactive work by Jean-Jacques Birgé and Antoine Schmitt, vision critique et sensible de la planète, zapping of 111 video loops (GRRR),1998
- AZ, music and sound design (Lux Modernis, Dauphin d'Or 99), 1998
- Firmenich, music with Denis Colin and sound design (Lux Modernis, Dauphin d'Or 99), 1998
- EuroPrix 98, music and sound design for European Multimedia trophees : CD-Rom, gala evening and TV show with Étienne Mineur (No Frontiere), 1998
- Mon Atelier De Noël, music and sound design (Hachette-Hyptique), 1998
- Cahiers Passeport, series of 7 CD-Roms, sound design (Hachette-Hyptique), 1998–2003
- La Tendresse, Cacharel, sound design (Lux Modernis), 1999
- Alphabet, interactive script, sound design and music (Dada Media-NHK Educational), 1999 Grand Prix Möbius International 2000, Prix Multimédia de la SACD 2000, Coup de coeur Trophées SVM Mac, Prix de la meilleure adaptation au Festival de Bologne en Italie, La Mention Spéciale au Salon du Livre de Jeunesse à Montreuil, First Prize CineKid en Hollande, GigaMaus en Allemagne, First Prize Package MMCA au Japon, et aux USA : Oppenheim Toy Portfolio Platinum Award 2002, Parents’ Choice Silver Honor 2001, Discovery.com Award of Excellence 2001, Software Magic Award Parenting Magazine 2001, Children's Software Review All Star Award 2001, Choosing Children's Software Best Pick 2001, Best Software Pick Edutaining Kids.com 2001
- Le Louvre, sound interface DVD-Rom (Montparnasse Multimédia, Flèche d'or, EMMA Award), 1999
- Le Grand Jeu, music and sound design (Hyptique-APCR-Buschet-Chastel), 2000
- Sethi et la couronne d'Egypte, music and sound design (Montparnasse Multimédia), 2000
- M. Heureux et le monde à l'envers, music and sound design (Hyptique-Emme), 2001
- Mr Men, 8 CD-Roms, music and sound design (Hyptique-Emme), 2002
- Salto et Zélia, 4 CD-Roms Atout P'tit Clic, sound design (Hyptique-Hachette), 2002–2004
- Le Bal, interactive music with B.Vitet, Prix SACD Création Interactive, 2002
- 1+1, une histoire naturelle du sexe, music for film and DVD-rom, (INA-Hyptique) Prix Möbius Sciences 2002, Prix Spécial du Jury Möbius International, Grand Prix Europrix Education/e-learning 2003, 2002
- Allonnes, music and sound design (incandescence/CNRS), 2003
- Domicile d'Ange heureux, music and sound design (dadamedia), Bologna Award, 2003
- Musée Fenaille, Rodez (Hyptique), 2004
- Troubles des apprentissages (ARTA), 2004
- Salto et Zélia (Hyptique-Hachette), sound design of DVDi Le chateau abandonné, 2005
- Balloon for iPad (Ed. Volumiques), sound design with Sacha Gattino, 2012
- Leonardo da Vinci's Dream Machine for iPad with Nicolas Clauss (Cité des Sciences et de l'Industrie), 2012
- DigDeep, music and sound design for iPad (Les indéditeurs), 2014
- Le ballon, Le safari en ballon, La fusée, La soucoupe volante, music and sound design (Ed. Volumiques, coll. Zephyr), 2015
- Boum!, music and sound design for iPad and Androïd (Les indéditeurs), Bologna Ragazzi Digital Award Special Mention 2016, Special Jury Prize Ehon Awards 2017), 2015
- La Maison Fantome, music and sound design with Sacha Gattino for iPad and Androïd (Ed. Volumiques, coll. Zephyr), 2015
- World of Yo-Ho, music and sound design (Ed. Volumiques), 2016
- Carambolages, music & sound score (exhibition at Grand Palais, Paris), 2016
- Woodchuck's Sleep, music and sound, for iPad (Numix), 2020–2022

=== Internet sites ===
- lecielestbleu : Prix SCAM 2001–2002, Meilleur Site Internet, Prix Coup de Coeur Narrowcast Content Awards 2002
- FlyingPuppet.com : Prix Spécial Centre Pompidou FlashFestival 2002 Spectacle - Danse interactive
- Somnambules : Senef Special Prize of Jury 2003 (Seoul Net Festival), Prix de la Création Nouveaux Médias Vidéoformes 2004 (Clermont-Ferrand), Prix de la Création Interactive SACD 2004, 1st Prize France Telecom R&D Oone (Art Rock Festival, St Brieuc), Prix Ars Electronica Net Vision / Net Excellence Honorary Mention 2004 (Autriche) and a nomination for the Best of 10 Years of Yahoo! as "The strangest site".
- Also: Rencontres Numer, BDDP-TBWA, Laurent-Perrier, Ville de Lyon, GRRR, Compagnie Générale des Eaux, ZoéTV, Determinism, Du côté des filles, Else Productions, Magado (Gallimard, avec Moebius), Virtools, Adidas, Nike, Fête de l'Internet 2001 (Matignon), lesmetiers.net (Caparif), Museum National d'Histoire Naturelle, Musée de l'Immigration, Ptits repères (Marque Repère), 2025 ex machina (serious game)...
- Web-series Prévert Exquis with Isabelle Fougère, Sonia Cruchon, Mikaël Cixous (Prix du meilleur projet francophone Cross Video Days TV5Monde), 2017.

=== Sound Design for objects and landscapes ===
- Nabaztag, smart rabbit, as well as Mir:ror and dal:dal (Violet), 2005–2009 / 2020
- Telesound (Readiymate), 2010–2013
- Study on the Métro du Grand Paris, 2014–2015
- Facade of La Maison de la Réunion, Paris, 2015
- Audio nudge messages of SNCF RER, 2020–2023

=== Various ===
- Foundation of light-shows H Lights & L'Œuf Hyaloïde : Cirque Bonjour, Daevid Allen Gong, Red Noise, Crouille-Marteaux (Pierre Clémenti, Jean-Pierre Kalfon, Melmoth), Dagon, Epimanondas, Steamhammer, Kevin Ayers... 1969–1974
- Light-Book, graphic works, Imprimerie Union, 1973
- Music for audiovisuals and records by Robert and Thierry Dehesdin, Michel Séméniako, Marie-Jésus Diaz, Charles Bitsch, Noël Burch, Claude Thiébaut, Daniel Verdier... 1975–1990
- Production of radio shows:
  - U.S.A. le complot and La peur du vide, France Musique, 1983
  - Improvisation mode d’emploi (series), France Culture, 1988
  - Écarlate, France Culture, 1989
- La corde à linge, novel with sounds and pictures, publie.net, 2011
- USA 1968 deux enfants, novel for iPad with sounds, pictures, films, interactivity, etc., Les inéditeurs, 2014
- Press articles written for Allumés du Jazz, Muziq, Jazz Magazine, Jazz@round, Jazzosphere, Nouveaux Dossiers de l'Audiovisuel, Revue du Cube, L'autre quotidien, La Nuit, Le Monde Diplomatique, Les Cahiers de l'Herne, Tk21, Mediapart, 1998–2025

== Sources ==
- Long interview with Klemen Breznikar, It's Psychedelic Baby! Magazine, (March 2022)
- Couleurs du monde with Françoise Degeorges, France Musique (March 2021)
- 4 hours radio interview with Nico Bogaerts on Radio Panik (1 2 December 2020)
- Long interview with Franpi Barriaux in Citizen Jazz (September 2018)
- Tapage nocturne on France Musique with Bruno Letort (11/03/2017)
- Le Parisien (11/29/2014)
- (in English) Interview and article in site Turbulence
- 34 pages on Jean-Jacques Birgé in Sextant #3 (June 2007)
- 8 pages interview on Impro Jazz #155 (May 2009)
- 4 pages by Annick Hémery in SVM Mac (November 2003 : 1 2 3 4)
- Annik Rivoire on Paris Connection in Liberation (02/23/2003)
- Stéphane Ollivier on Un d.m.i. dans Vacarme (summer 1997)
- On Drame :
- A blindfold test by Stéphane Ollivier in Jazz Magazine (January 1999 : 1 2)
- Le Drame, 4 pages by Francis Marmande dans Jazz Magazine (January 1990: 1 2 3 4)
- Self-portrait with Alain-René Hardy in Jazz Magazine (January 1978 : 1 2)
