= Un Drame Musical Instantané =

French jazz ensemble, founded 1976

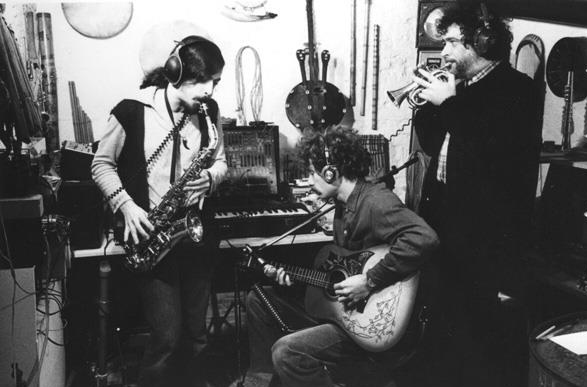
- Un Drame Musical Instantané, (1982).

Background information
- Origin: France
- Genres: Jazz, avant-garde, free improvisation, experimental, avant-garde jazz
- Years active: 1976–present
- Labels: Grrr, Klanggalerie, No Man's Land, Unidisc, Tempo
- Members: Jean-Jacques Birgé; Philippe Deschepper; Nem
- Past members: Bernard Vitet (deceased); Francis Gorgé; Bruno Barré; Kent Carter; Nathalie Baudoin; Jouk Minor; Didier Petit; Geneviève Cabannes; Hélène Sage; Magali Viallefond; Jean Querlier; Youenn Le Berre; Philippe Legris; Patrice Petitdidier; Jacques Marugg
- Website: www.drame.org

Un Drame Musical Instantané, since its creation in 1976, featuring Jean-Jacques Birgé, Bernard Vitet and Francis Gorgé, has decided to promote collective musical creation, co-signing their albums, which they consider as artworks in themselves, or their live shows which they try to renew every time they play.

== History ==
They borrowed their sources from rock (synthesizer player Birgé and guitarist Gorgé, both authors of the album, Défense de); jazz (trumpeter Vitet who founded the first free jazz band in France, together with François Tusques, as well as Michel Portal who played with many American and European jazzmen); classical modern music; as well as movies or world news; they were the first in France to give a new impetus to live music on silent movies.

Twenty four creations were in their repertoire, among which were Caligari by Robert Wiene, La glace à trois faces and La chute de la Maison Usher by Jean Epstein, The passion of Joan of Arc by Carl Dreyer, Man with a Movie Camera by Dziga Vertov, and L'argent by Marcel L'Herbier. After having improvised freely for many years, they led a fifteen-piece orchestra from 1981 to 1986, and since 1989 they have produced multimedia shows (live video remix on a giant screen, fireworks, choreographies), but their most convincing musical theater was mainly audio, which they have called "blind cinema". The Drame used to mix acoustic and electronic instruments in real time as well as original instruments built by Vitet (a reed trumpet, a multiphonic French horn, a variable tension double-bass, a giant balafon with frying pans and flower pots keyboard, a fire organ, plexiglas flutes, etc.)

After Francis Gorgé has left the band in 1992, Birgé and Vitet went on recording and producing with other musicians close to the "family" such as percussionist, Gérard Siracusa, or multi-instrumentalist, Hélène Sage. Un Drame Musical Instantané which has always remain independent (they have always owned their own recording studio and record label GRRR) stopped its activities in 2008, Birgé remaining the only one on the music scene. And Vitet died on July 3, 2013.

However, Un Drame Musical Instantané has come back on stage in 2014, featuring Birgé, Gorgé, Sage, plus several guests, and Birgé Gorgé got back together with writer Dominique Meens in 2022 and live with Amandine Casadamont on turntables in 2023.

== Discography ==
- Très toxique (GRRR / also on Toxic Rice, Psych.KG, D) 1976 (issued 2023)
- Trop d'adrénaline nuit (GRRR, France), 1977 (issued 1979) - CD reissue+bonus+DVD (Mio, Israel), 2001 - LP reissue+DVD (Wah-Wah, Spain), 2013
- Rideau ! (GRRR), 1980 - CD reissue+bonus (Klang Galerie, Austria), 2017
- Pas de cadeau in 18 surprises pour Noël (DeQualité, France), 1981
- À travail égal salaire égal, for orchestra (GRRR), 1982 - CD reissue+bonus (Klang Galerie, Austria), 2018
- Under The Channel in In Fractured Silence (United Dairies, GB), 1983
- Les bons contes font les bons amis, for orchestra (GRRR), 1983 - CD reissue+bonus (Klang Galerie, Austria), 2022
- L'uniforme in mc Unique (France), 1984
- L'homme à la caméra, for orchestra (GRRR), 1984 - bundle with LP remix by Jorge Velez, Le Tone, Eltron John, Tuff Sherm (DDD, France), 2017 - CD reissue+bonus (Klang Galerie, Austria), 2020
- Das Kabinett des Doktor Caligari in mc Bad Alchemy (Germany), 1985
- Carnage, incl. La Bourse et la vie, N.O.P. dir. Yves Prin (GRRR), 1985 - CD reissue+bonus (Klang Galerie, Austria), 2021
- French Resistance in Dry Lungs II (Placebo, USA), 1986
- Interview in mc Planeta (France), 1986
- Fear of Vacancy in Journey Into Pain (mc BST, Japan), 1986
- Don't Lock The Cage in Dry Lungs III (Placebo, USA), 1987
- L'hallali, avec Frank Royon Le Mée, Dominique Fonfrède, Martine Viard, Louis Hagen-William, L'Itinéraire, dir. Boris de Vinogradov, incl. opera-bouffe La Fosse (GRRR), 1987
- Sous les mers (GRRR), 1988
- Qui vive ? (GRRR), 1989
- Der Falsche Mann in Out of Depression (Germany)
- Le futur abyssal in Mouvements (La légende des voix, France), 1990
- Le K, text by Dino Buzzati with Richard Bohringer (GRRR, reissue Auvidis), Nomination at 9th Victoires de la Musique, 1990–93
- Pale Driver Killed By A Swallow On A Country Road in Dry Lungs IV (Subterranean Records, USA), 1991
- Le fond de l'âme effraie : Air Cut in Atomic Zen (Dedali Opera, Japan), 1991
- North Eating South Starving in A Gnomean Haigonaimean (Johnny Blue, Portugal), 1991
- Jeune fille qui tombe... tombe, text by Dino Buzzati with Daniel Laloux (In Situ, France), 1991
- Kind Lieder, nine songs which hurt (GRRR), 1991
- Rien ne va plus in Dry Lungs V (Subterranean Records, USA), 1992
- Utopie Standard in Passionnément (Visa, France), 1992
- Urgent Meeting, with Colette Magny, Didier Malherbe, Michel Godard, Louis Sclavis, Raymond Boni, Gérard Siracusa, Vinko Globokar, Yves Robert, François Tusques, Denis Colin... (GRRR/No Man’s land), 1992
- Opération Blow Up, with Brigitte Fontaine, Henri Texier, Luc Ferrari, Joëlle Léandre, Valentin Clastrier, René Lussier... (GRRR), 1992
- Musica Per Dimagrire in Musica Propiziatoria (Museo Immaginario, Italy), 1993
- Zappeurs-Pompiers 2 in Journal de bord (38e Rugissants, France), 1993
- Crasse-Tignasse, songs for children who like to be frightened (Auvidis, France), 1993
- 3 pieces with Dee Dee Bridgewater and Balanescu String Quartet in Sarajevo Suite (L’empreinte digitale),1994
- ¡Vivan las utopias! in Buenaventura Durruti (nato, France), 1996
- L'instable and So Deep in L'étrange (CMG, France), 1998
- Machiavel (GRRR), with Benoît Delbecq, Steve Argüelles, DJ Nem, Philippe Deschepper..., 1998
- Wit in Enhanced Gravity (Yucca Tree, Germany), 1999
- Ça ira in Les Actualités, with singer Baco (Les Allumés du Jazz, France), 2006
- C'est le bouquet (unissued CD to be downloaded with Sextant magazine, GRRR), 2007
- Poils et plumes with writer Dominique Meens (GRRR), to be issued in 2022
- 194 hours of unissued, freely downlable, music (105 albums, 1479 pieces) on drame.org, 2010-2025
- Fluxus +/- with Kommissar Hjuler, Mama Baer (Psych.KG, Germany), 2022

== Live shows ==
- Long series of Poisons, 1976–79
- 24 silent movies with live orchestra, 1977-99 : À propos de Nice (Jean Vigo), The Battleship Potemkin & Strike (Sergei Eisenstein), La glace à trois faces & La chute de la Maison Usher (Jean Epstein), Caligari (Robert Wiene), Nosferatu (F.W. Murnau), Waxworks (Paul Leni), Man with a Movie Camera (Dziga Vertov), The Passion of Joan of Arc (Carl Dreyer), Enfants à Paris (coll. Albert Kahn), Fantômas (5 episodes by Louis Feuillade) and Vampires, La vie de notre Seigneur Jésus Christ (C. Pathé), Mysterious X & Häxan (Benjamin Christensen), L'Argent (Marcel L'Herbier)...
- La rue, la musique et nous. Arcueil, 1979
- Rideau!, 1980
- Sound-art in Parc della Rimembranza. Napoli (Italy), 1981
- Pieces for orchestra, 1981–86
- Le trou, from Edgar Allan Poe, 1982
- Music for fire organ and orchestra, 1983
- Los Angeles Olympic Games (live with satellite projection, Festival d'Avignon), 1984
- La Bourse et la vie (Nouvel Orchestre Philharmonique de Radio France, dir.Yves Prin), 1984
- 45 secondes départ arrêté & Féeries Jacobines (fireworks), 1984–85
- Ballet music for Jean Gaudin (Ecarlate), Karine Saporta (Manèges at Opéra de Paris, Le Coeur Métamorphosé at Théâtre de la Ville), Lulla Card... 1985-1989
- Jeune fille qui tombe... tombe by Dino Buzzati (oratorio, Michael Lonsdale / Daniel Laloux), 1985–90
- Le K by Dino Buzzati (oratorio, Michael Lonsdale / Richard Bohringer - Daniel Laloux, scenery R.Sarti), 1985–92
- La Fosse (opera-bouffe, Martine Viard, Louis Hagen-William, l'Itinéraire), 1987
- Le Chateau des Carpathes by Jules Verne (burning cantata, Frank Royon Le Mée), 1987
- 20 000 lieues sous mers (magical show and imaginary museum on 2 boats, La Péniche Opéra), 1988
- Zappeurs-Pompiers 1 & 2 (live zapping on giant screen, Lulla Card, Éric Houzelot / Guy Pannequin), 1987–89
- J'accuse by Émile Zola (R.Bohringer, D.Fonfrède, Ahmed Madani, 70 musicians, dir.Jean-Luc Fillon, scenery Raymond Sarti), 1989
- Contrefaçons (orchestra, dir.J-L.Fillon), 1989
- Kind Lieder, 1991
- Let my children hear music by Charlie Mingus, 1992
- Crasse-Tignasse, show for children, 1993–94
- Machiavel (improvised techno with interactive images), 1999–2000
- Resurrection, 2014
- Under The Channel, 2024

== Radio ==
- U.S.A. le complot & La peur du vide, France Musique, 1983
- Écarlate, France Culture, 1989

== Video ==
- Antène 1, real. Emmanuelle K, 1983
- Auhourd'hui en France, real. Didier Ranz, 1987
- Le K, real. Ch. Gomila, 1989
- More than 20 links to films on Un d.m.i.

== Bibliography ==
- {fr} A two pages self-portrait with Alain-René Hardy in Jazz magazine (January 1978 : 1 2)
- {fr} Stéphane Ollivier on Un d.m.i. in Vacarme (été 1997)
- {fr} A two pages blindfold with Stéphane Ollivier dans Jazz magazine (January 1999 : 1 2)
