= Ovida Delect =

French trans poet, communist and victim of the Holocaust

- Born: Jean-Pierre Voidies; 24 April 1926; Caen, France
- Died: 9 October 1996 (aged 70)
- Monuments: La place Ovida-Delect, Paris
- Education: École normale supérieure
- Occupations: Poet, politician, memoirist, activist
- Known for: Resistance fighter, trans rights spokesperson
- Children: 1

Ovida Delect (24 April 1926 – 9 October 1996) was a French poet, Communist, politician and member of the French resistance during the Second World War. She was also a trans woman and wrote a two volume autobiography about her life, in which she identified similarities between her own experience and that of Christine Jorgensen. Delect starred in a documentary, which brought the experiences of trans women into the wider canon of women in French film.

== Biography ==
=== Early life ===
Delect was born in Caen on 24 April 1926. Her birth name was Jean-Pierre Voidies. In the early 1940s, Ovida was a student at the Lycée Malherbe and lived in rue Laumonnier in Caen. According to Victoria Thérame, who stated in the preface to Delect's work La vocation d’être femme, itinéraire d’une transsexuelle vécue, that:

"Ça commence par une gamine qui a un corps de gamin et l’audace d’un héros. Ça continue par un garçon de seize ans qui sait qu’il est une fille, laquelle a des convictions fortes et la liberté en tête. [Translation: It starts with a kid who has a kid's body and the audacity of a hero. It continues with a sixteen-year-old boy who knows he is a girl, who has strong convictions and freedom in mind.]"

=== Resistance and imprisonment ===
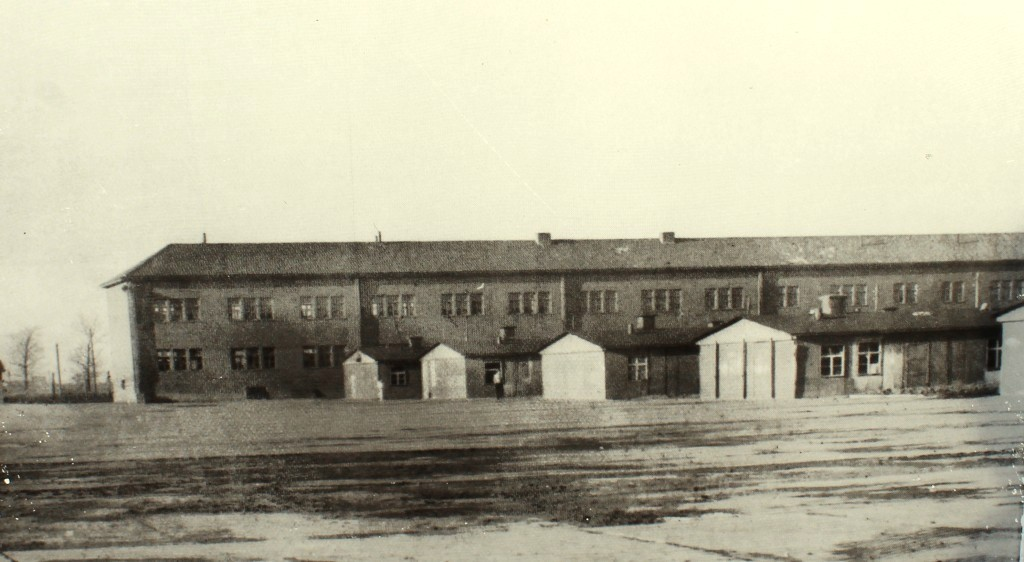
Neuengamme west Klinkergebäude

Whilst at Lycée Malherbe, Delect established a small resistance group with a number of other students: Roger Câtel, Bernard Duval, Bernard Boulot, Claude Lunois and Jean-Paul Mérouze. The group was attached to the National Front, a movement created by the French Communist Party (PCF). She pretended she was a member of the National Popular Youth, a branch of the National Popular Rally, presenting herself as a supporter of collaboration with the Germans. She managed to steal important files and create major disturbances in the ranks of this organization by disseminating fake news items and false information. These actions led to her being arrested by the Gestapo on 23 February 1944, together with several of her comrades. She was tortured for at least ten days at 44 rue des Jacobins, before being deported to Germany. Under torture, she did not denounce her comrades. She was deported to and imprisoned at the Neuengamme concentration camp. (Note: Delect did not socially transition until later life and at the time of her arrest and imprisonment appeared male. Her internment documentation used her birth name.)

=== Life after war ===
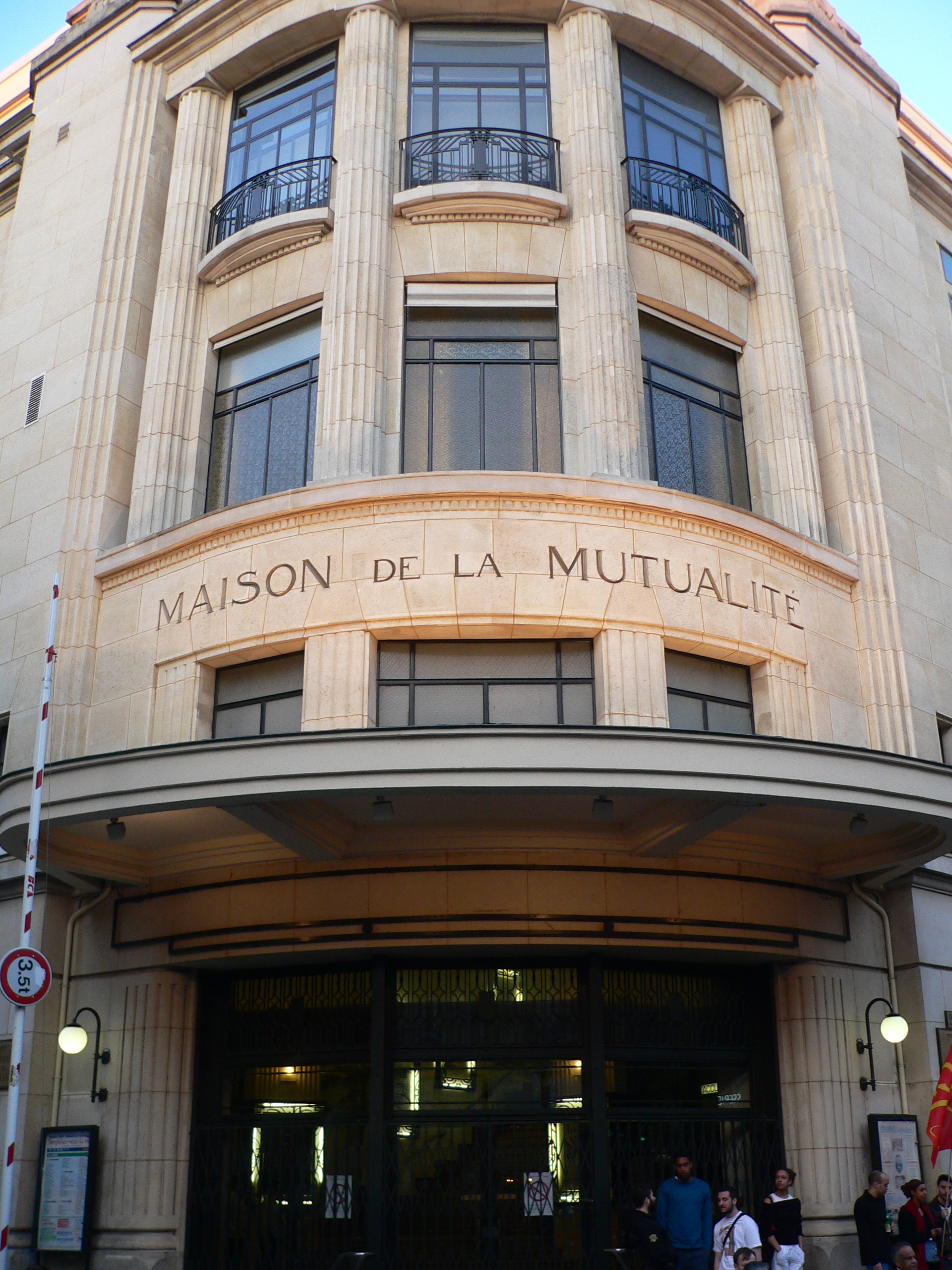
La Mutualite

After the war, Delect returned to her studies and obtained her second baccalaureate in 1946. She began to publish her resistance poems in local journals. She won the Paul Valéry Prize in 1946 and one of her works was read at the Maison de la Mutualité. She left Caen to study in Paris, where she formed a circle of poets. She met Paul Eluard, who read Poème des temps nouvelles at the Mutualité. To survive in the Paris, she worked at what she described as “small jobs” in her biography. She passed the entrance exam to the École normale supérieure and became a literature teacher.

During the summer of 1952 in Hyères, she met her future wife Huguette, a kindergarten teacher from Sarthe. While she did not yet go by the name Ovida publicly, she confided her identity to her friends and wife and she publicly discussed her poetic and humanist aspirations. Both she and Huguette worked as teachers. They had a son together, Jean-Noel.

In 1953, Ovida read about the transition of Christine Jorgensen in the press and was reportedly shocked by the similarity between their lives.

At the beginning of the 1960s, Delect, under her birth name Jean-Pierre Voidies, became mayor of Freneuse, a town of 2,800 inhabitants of Île-de-France. At the end of the 1960s, Delect wrote La Demoiselle de Kerk, a poetic prose novel that tells the story of a young girl under the occupation in Caen. She commented that the work was “a transposed autobiography."

=== Later life and social transition ===
At the age of 55, Ovida retired, she made a social transition and chose the pen name she has been using since 1975, Olivia Ovida Delect. She continued to live with Huguette Voidies, her wife, and their son in Saint Pierre Alizay.

Delect decided at the age of 60 to participate in the filming of a documentary directed by Françoise Romand, called Appelez-moi Madame. The film was broadcast in 1986.

At the end of the 1980s, historian Christine Bard met Delect, who had come to the Maison des Femmes in Paris to read her poems. In her book, Ce que soulève la jupe: identités, transgressions, résistances, Bard discussed how “with Ovida Delect […] the skirt is resisting in all senses of the word, because it was resistant all the time: like a “failed girl” in the face ... of her parents, Catholic conservatives, then as a high school student facing the occupier [...] deported to the Neuengamme camp where she survived for a year thanks to the feminine universe she maintained in her imagination".

Delect died on 9 October 1996.

== Legacy ==
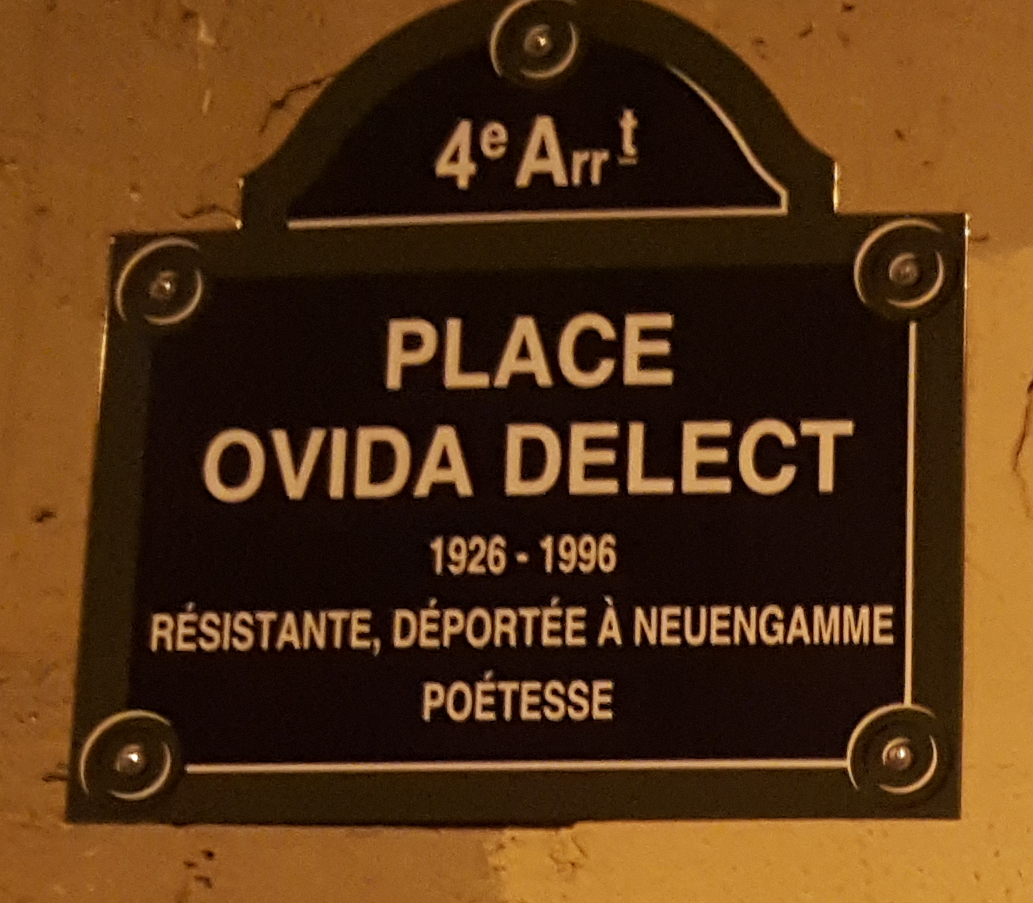
Plaque dedicating a street to Ovida Delect in Paris. The plaque reads: "Resistance member, deported to Neuengamme, poet."

On 19 June 2019 La place Ovida-Delect was inaugurated in Paris in the 4th arrondissement, the square is at the intersection of rue des Blancs Manteaux and rue des Archives. The inauguration was timed to coincide with the 41st year of Paris' Pride March and the 75th anniversary of the Liberation of Paris.

== Reception ==
Delect's life is also recognised as important in the struggle trans women have faced for assimilation into French society. She was a prolific writer, producing multiple volumes of poetry throughout her life, as well as two volumes of autobiography.

Delect's appearance in the documentary Appelez-moi Madame has been recognised as a notable point in the history of women in French cinema. However, not all reviews were positive, including a transphobic review by Armond White which cast doubt on Delect's identity and described her poetry as "bad".

=== Selected works ===
- Contes et poèmes pour mon petit garçon (Éditions du Pavillon, 1969).
- La prise de robe: itinéraire d'une transsexualité vécue (Self-published, 1982).
- Il y en a que j'aime tant (FeniXX réédition numérique, 1988).
- Les chevaux de frise couraient sur l'hippodrome (Editions L'Harmattan, 1994).

=== Filmography ===
- 1986: Appelez-moi Madame by Françoise Romand, 52 minutes.

== See also ==
- Lucy Salani - the only known Italian trans woman to survive the Nazi concentration camps.
