= Jacques Perconte =

- Born: Jacques Perconte; 23 October 1974 (age 51); Grenoble, France
- Known for: film, new media art, internet art, video art, digital technology
- Website: www.jacquesperconte.com

Jacques Perconte is a French Filmmaker and new media artist born 1974 and living in Paris. His last artwork After the fire travelled all over the world. Since 1999 his films and new media projects explore the digital medium. He started to use video compression artifacts as the centre of his technic in 2002.

== Life ==
" As nothing in the machine is alien to Jacques Perconte, he knows how to push it beyond its limits, how to think and create with its flaws. After him, the digital machinery is not faithful to the world because it can record its appearance, but because it can perceive its vibrations (in particular its chromatic ones), which are not mimetic, but analogous to the vibrations of reality. After more than twenty films and many monographic exhibitions, he still declares : 'I don't search, I venture !' "

Nicole Brenez, historian of cinema, Cinémathèque Française.

Born in 1974 in Grenoble (France), Jacques Perconte lives and works in Paris. He is well known as one of the pioneers of French internet art. He is among the first artists to have worked on compression codecs. Jacques made his debuts with internet and video art. His first films date back from 1995 and his first internet artworks from 1996. The website technart.net is the core of his work, showcasing all his activities (notes, articles, performances... the web is endless). He frequently works with other artists, including Michel Herreria (painter), Didier Arnaudet (poet), Marc Em (musician), Hugo Verlinde (film maker), Léos Carax dans Holy Motors, Jean-Benoit Dunckel, Julie Rousse, Eddie Ladoire, Simonluca Laitempergher, Hélène Breschand, Jean-Jacques Birgé, Vincent Segal, Antonin-Tri Huang et Jeff Mills.

Even though his works become less and less theoretical, the relation between form and substance remains crucial. Jacques Perconte works on the forms of fiction on various medias as well as a formal research, focused on the body and the landscape.

Jacques Perconte apparently has a good knowledge of his technology, which serves him when dealing with frame and color. He tries to transform digital technology into a new media, which can be esthetically as rich as any other classical art.

== A selection of works ==
Videos : After the fire (2010), Satyagraha (2009), Pauillac, Margaux (2008) uishet (2007), uaoen (2003). Photography : 38degrés (2003–2007), corps numériques (2002). Digital artworks : I love you (2004), Chi Ocsha (2001–2005), tempo e pause (2001). Installations : Soldes d'hiver (Bordeaux, 2008), Entre le ciel et la terre (Évry, 2007).

Three films by Jacques Perconte on the website of Collectif Jeune Cinéma : Le Passage, Pauillac, Margaux, Uishet. Jacques Perconte is now preparing his new video, Impressions, produced by Triptyque Films, in which he follows French Impressionist's trail in Normandy.

== Filmography ==
- 2010 Impressions, HD, 26min, Triptyque Films.
- 2009 Après le feu, HD, 7min
- 2009 La marche au coeur d'Annette, HD, 12min.
- 2009 Satyagraha (OUTRAGE&REBELLION), HD 5min.
- 2009 Le passage, HD 6min.
- 2008 Pauillac, Margaux, HD 10min.
- 2008 Hung Up, HD 5min.
- 2007 uishet, HD 13min.
- 2007 white altaïr, (d'après Hugo Verlinde) HD 3min.
- 2007 Le soleil de Patiras, 3min.
- 2006 M’pempba, avec Roger Djiguembé.
- 2005 octobre, 2min.
- 2005 k.a.r.a.o.k.e, avec Michel Herreria.
- 2005 Saint Augustin, SD 10min.
- 2005 Starkles, 38min.
- 2003 uaoen, SD, 29min.
- 2003 isz, SD, 17min.
- 2002 snsz, SD 29min.
- 2002 nszra, SD.
- 2002 wissszzz wiiijing
- 2002 esz, SD 4min.
- 2002 xsz, SD 4min.
- 2001 I'm a slave for you
- 2001 Phex, SD 145min.
- 2001 Tempo e pause, SD 60min.
- 2001 matre zias e imaji imacul, SD 132min.
- 1999 promenade, SD 11 min.
- 1999 Chloé
- 1998 Corps Numériques, SD 44min.
- 1997 Ncorps, SD 43min.
- 1997 Sables, SD 63min
- 1996 razer, SD 6min.
- 1995 azar, SD 17min.

== References (in French) ==
- Le Cinéma Critique : De Lʼargentique au Numérique, Voies Et Formes De L'objection Visuelle, Histo.art, ISSN 2101-7719; 2, 1 vols (Paris: Publications de la Sorbonne, 2010).
- Rodolphe Olcèse, The filmic experience of the world (offline, en-fr), Art Press 2, n°21, 2011, Paris
- Sun Jung Yeo, Pesanteur et Couleur digitale : Uishet et Entre le Ciel et la Terre de Jacques Perconte (fr) in Dubois, Philippe/Lúcia Ramos Monteiro/Bordina, Alessandro (2009): Oui, c’est du cinéma/Yes, it’s cinema. Formes et espaces de l’image en mouvement/Forms and Spaces of the Moving Image. Pasian di Prato : Campanotto Editore ISBN 978-88-456-1087-5
- Violaine Boutet de Monvel, Jacques Perconte: The Digital Image, and the Sublime (en), Digitalarti (Paris), no. 2, April–May–June 2010
- Nicole Brenez, French Experimental Cinema (en-fr), Mubi.com, 2010–2011
- Damien Marguet : Jacques Perconte, Images de l’invisible (fr), 2009
- Ludovic Lamant, Montreuil, Gandhi (fr), Mediapart, 2009

== Official links ==
- technart.net
- jacquesperconte.com
- images notes et mouvements
- Digitalarti Mag
