= Grrr Records =

French avant-garde jazz record label

- Parent company: Allumés du Jazz
- Founded: 1975
- Founder: Jean-Jacques Birgé
- Genre: Avant-garde jazz
- Country of origin: France
- Location: Paris
- Official website: Official site

Grrr Records is a French avant-garde jazz record label founded by Jean-Jacques Birgé in 1975. Grrr belongs to Les Allumés du Jazz, 100 French independent jazz and improvised music labels.

The first LP by Grrr was Défense de by Birgé-Gorgé-Shiroc, which became a cult-album after having been quoted in the Nurse with Wound list.

Grrr has been issuing CDs since 1987 with L'hallali by Un Drame Musical Instantané, led by multi-instrumentalist Jean-Jacques Birgé, trumpeter Bernard Vitet and guitarist Francis Gorgé. The label also produced the albums of multi-instrumentalist composer Hélène Sage, accordionist Michèle Buirette and female trio Pied de Poule (M. Buirette, bassist, Geneviève Cabannes, and singer Dominique Fonfrède). Barcelonian label Wah Wah has reissued Défende de and Austrian label Klang Galerie issues remastered CDs of all LPs by Un drame musical instantané.

In 1997, Carton by Birgé-Vitet (with Michel Séméniako's photographs) was released as the label's first enhanced-CD and Birgé's first multimedia artwork. The album was followed by Machiavel by Un d.m.i. (CD-audio + CD-ROM), with an interactive video sessions of 111 loops by J-J. Birgé and Antoine Schmitt.

Later albums produced by Grrr include Établissement d'un ciel d'alternance, duet with Birgé and French writer Michel Houellebecq who reads his own text (No. 26), Échappée belle by Hélène Sage (No. 27), two albums by Michèle Buirette and, in 2017, Long Time No Sea by trio El Strøm (No. 29) and in 2018, The 100th Anniversary of Jean-Jacques Birgé (No. 30). In 2020, for the double CD Pique-nique au labo (No. 31-32), Birgé invited 28 improvisers to join him for meetings covering the period 2010–2019. In 2022, Un drame musical instantané comes back with a brand new CD, Plumes et poils.

Since 2011, Grrr has issued freely downloadable material (105 unissued albums + a random radio which feature 1479 pieces and last 194 hours). 2025 is the 50th anniversary of GRRR Recods!

== See also ==
- Lists of record labels
