= Lucy Salani =

Italian LGBT rights activist (1924–2023)

- Lucy Salani, photographed c. 2023
- Born: Luciano Salani; 12 August 1924; Fossano, Italy
- Died: 21 March 2023 (aged 98); Bologna, Italy
- Occupation: Activist
- Known for: Anti-fascist; army deserter; Dachau concentration camp survivor; trans rights spokesperson

Lucy Salani (12 August 1924 – 21 March 2023) was an Italian activist and the only known Italian survived person to the Nazi concentration camps to be transgender. Born in Fossano and raised in Bologna, Salani was understood to be a gay man before undergoing gender-affirming surgery later in her life. An anti-fascist, Salani deserted both the fascist Italian and the Nazi German armies during World War II before being caught and deported to Dachau concentration camp in 1944, where she remained until the liberation of the camp by the United States Armed Forces in April 1945.

Following her liberation and the end of the war, Salani lived in Rome, Turin and Paris before completing her transition in London. She then returned to Bologna in the 1980s, eventually spending the rest of her life in the city. Her life story gained public attention during the 2010s, as writer and director Gabriella Romano dedicated a biography and a documentary to her.

== Biography ==
=== Early life ===
Lucy Salani was born as Luciano Salani in Fossano, Piedmont, in 1924. She then moved to Bologna with her family, who had Emilian origins and raised her with anti-fascist values. However, Salani was rejected by her father and brothers because of her homosexuality, and had to keep her relationships with men hidden in order to avoid persecution from the fascist regime.

=== World War II and deportation in Dachau ===
In August 1943, during World War II, Salani was called up to the Italian army, as military service had been made mandatory for all young men. After a failed desertion attempt, she was sent to serve in Cormons, Friuli-Venezia Giulia. However, she managed to desert from the army shortly after the Armistice of Cassibile in September 1943, returning to Bologna and reuniting with her parents, who had fled to Mirandola. However, in fear of putting her family in danger, Salani came out of desertion, being subsequently forced to join a group of the Nazi German army in Suviana, where she was assigned to anti-aircraft warfare. However, she successfully deserted once again; after throwing herself into icy water and contracting pneumonia as a result, she managed to run away from the hospital she had been brought to in Bologna.

Salani spent the following months living in the city as a prostitute, having even several German officers as clients. However, during a meeting with one of the aforementioned officers in a hotel, the police broke into the building and arrested her after finding out about her desertion. She was subsequently locked up in the cellar of a farmhouse near Padua, from which she managed to escape thanks to a broken lock, only to be caught again in Mirandola. She was then incarcerated in Bologna and Modena, before being taken to Verona, where a criminal case was held against her. Although Salani was originally sentenced to death, she persuaded German general Albert Kesselring to concede her a pardon, and was sent to a labor camp in Bernau, Germany instead. She managed to escape from the camp, as well, together with another prisoner, who was later killed by German officers during their escape. However, after reaching the border between Austria and Italy by train, Salani was caught once more.

As a result, Salani was deported to the Dachau concentration camp, where she was marked with the red triangle, intended for political prisoners and deserters. Despite being repeatedly tortured by Nazi officers in the camp, she survived for six months, until the camp was eventually liberated by American troops in April 1945; at the time, she was 20 years old. Earlier on the day of her liberation, she survived a mass shooting by the Nazis, as she was wounded in the knee and fell among the corpses of other prisoners, before American soldiers eventually found her alive. According to the Italian trans rights organization Trans Identity Movement, Salani was the only transgender person in the country to have survived imprisonment and torture in the Nazi concentration camps.

=== Life after World War II and transition ===
After her liberation and the end of World War II, Salani worked as an upholsterer and lived in Rome and Turin. She also traveled extensively, as part of a cabaret group, and often visited Paris, frequenting the local transgender community.

In the mid-1980s, Salani moved to London, where she underwent gender affirming care. However, she chose not to change her legal name, stating that it was sacred to her, having been given to her by her parents, and asking why a woman could not be named "Luciano".

=== Late life and public recognition ===
Salani returned to Bologna during the 1980s, in order to take care of her parents, and eventually spent the rest of her life in the city. She was active as an anti-fascist, and as an advocate for LGBT rights.

Her story gained public attention for the first time in 2009, when writer and director Gabriella Romano wrote a biography of her, titled Il mio nome è Lucy. L'Italia del XX secolo nei ricordi di una transessuale. In 2011, Romano also directed a documentary film centered on her, named Essere Lucy.

In 2014, Salani was interviewed by director Gianni Amelio as part of his documentary Felice chi è diverso. In January 2018, she was invited to take part in a demonstration organized by LGBT rights associations Arcigay and Arcilesbica for the International Holocaust Remembrance Day. On that occasion, she said: "It is impossible to forget and forgive. Some nights, I still dream of the most horrendous things I saw, and I feel like I'm still [trapped] there, and so, I want people to know what happened in the concentration camps, so that it won't happen again."

In January 2018, several newspapers, including Switzerland's Le Matin, French magazine Têtu and Italy's Corriere della Sera, reported that Salani was living in poverty and rejected by many local hospices. In the meantime, she received help and support from volunteers of the Trans Identity Movement.

In November 2019, the president of Arcigay Rome, Francesco Angeli, asked Italian president Sergio Mattarella to nominate Salani as senator for life.

In 2021, a new documentary film about the life of Salani, named C'è un soffio di vita soltanto and directed by Matteo Botrugno and Daniele Coluccini, was released. The documentary, whose title was taken from the final verse of a poem written by Salani herself, described her everyday life in Bologna and her return to Dachau, where she had been invited for the 75th anniversary of the concentration camp's liberation.

In summer 2022, she was honored by the city council of Bologna for her activism.

Salani died late evening of 21 March 2023, aged 98.

In october 2025 a book on her life and with some of her documents was published, Quasi un secolo. Vita di Lucy Salani, edited by Simone Cangelosi e Fulvia Antonelli with lots of tributes from friends and activists.

== Bibliography ==
- Romano, Gabriella (2009). Il mio nome è Lucy. L'Italia del XX secolo nei ricordi di una transessuale [My name is Lucy. 20th century's Italy in a transgender [woman]'s memories] (in Italian). Donzelli Editore. ISBN 978-8-8603-6362-6.
- Romano, Gabriella (2012). Essere Lucy (in Italian). Manifesto Libri. ISBN 978-8-8728-5564-5.

== Filmography ==
- Essere Lucy (2011)
- Felice chi è diverso (2014)
- C'è un soffio di vita soltanto (2021)

== See also ==
- Ovida Delect
