= Allumés du Jazz =

French independent record label

Les Allumés du Jazz is an association formed in 1996, regrouping independent labels of all allegiances and widely varying trends, from traditional jazz to the most innovative. Les Allumés du Jazz publishes a newspaper every three to four months. On their website, one can find a catalogue of almost 2,000 available records. More than 3,000 jazz and improvising musicians can be searched.

In 2024 they are 111 labels including:

- AA Le Petit Faucheux
- Abalone
- ACM Jazz Label
- AJMI
- Alambik Musik
- Amarela
- Amor Fati
- Anima Nostra
- ArchieBall
- ARFI
- Au sud du nord
- Axolotl Jazz
- Ayler
- Bisou
- Buda Transes Européennes
- Camille Productions
- Capsul Records
- Celp
- Chief Inspector
- Circum-Disc
- Cismonte è Pumanti
- Coax Records
- Collectif 3h10
- Collectif Musique en Friche
- Collection Commune
- Compagnie des Musiques Têtues
- Compagnie Miniatures
- Cranes Records
- DAC Records
- Das Kapital
- Decalcophonie
- Dfragment
- Douzième Lune
- Element 124
- Emil 13
- EMD
- Émouvance
- Fou Records
- Gimini
- Grand Chahut Collectif
- Grolektif
- Grrr
- Igloo
- Il Monstro Prod
- Illusions
- Improvising Beings
- IMR Instantmusicrecords
- In Situ
- Innacor
- Jazzdor
- Jim A. Musiques
- Juju Works
- L'1consolable
- L'arbre Canapas
- La Buissonne
- La traversée des apparences
- La Tribu Hérisson
- Label Bleu
- Label La Forge
- Label Laborie
- Label Usine
- Lagunarte
- Le Fondeur du Son
- Le Maxiphone
- Le Triton
- Les neuf filles de Zeus
- Les Productions de l'Orchestre Maigre
- Linoleum
- LMD Productions / Evidence
- Mazeto Square
- Melisse
- Mélodie en sous-sol
- Metal Satin Lutherie Urbaine
- Momentanea
- Musivi / Jazzbank
- MZ Records / Marmouzic
- Naï Nô Records
- nato
- Nemo
- ONJ Records
- Onze Heures Onze
- Ormo Records
- Ouch ! Records
- Peewee
- Petit Label
- Poros Éditions
- Potlatch
- Quark Record
- Quoi de neuf docteur
- Rectangle
- ReQords
- Resolution
- RogueArt
- Rude Awakening présente
- Saravah
- Sometime Studio
- Space Time Records
- Suite
- Sunset Records
- Terra Incognita
- The Bridge Sessions
- Tour de Bras
- Trois Quatre
- Ulltrabolic
- Umlaut
- Vand'Œuvre
- Vent d'Est
- Vent du Sud
- Vision Fugitive
- Wildscate
- Wing Heart Records
- Yolk
