= Françoise Romand =

French filmmaker

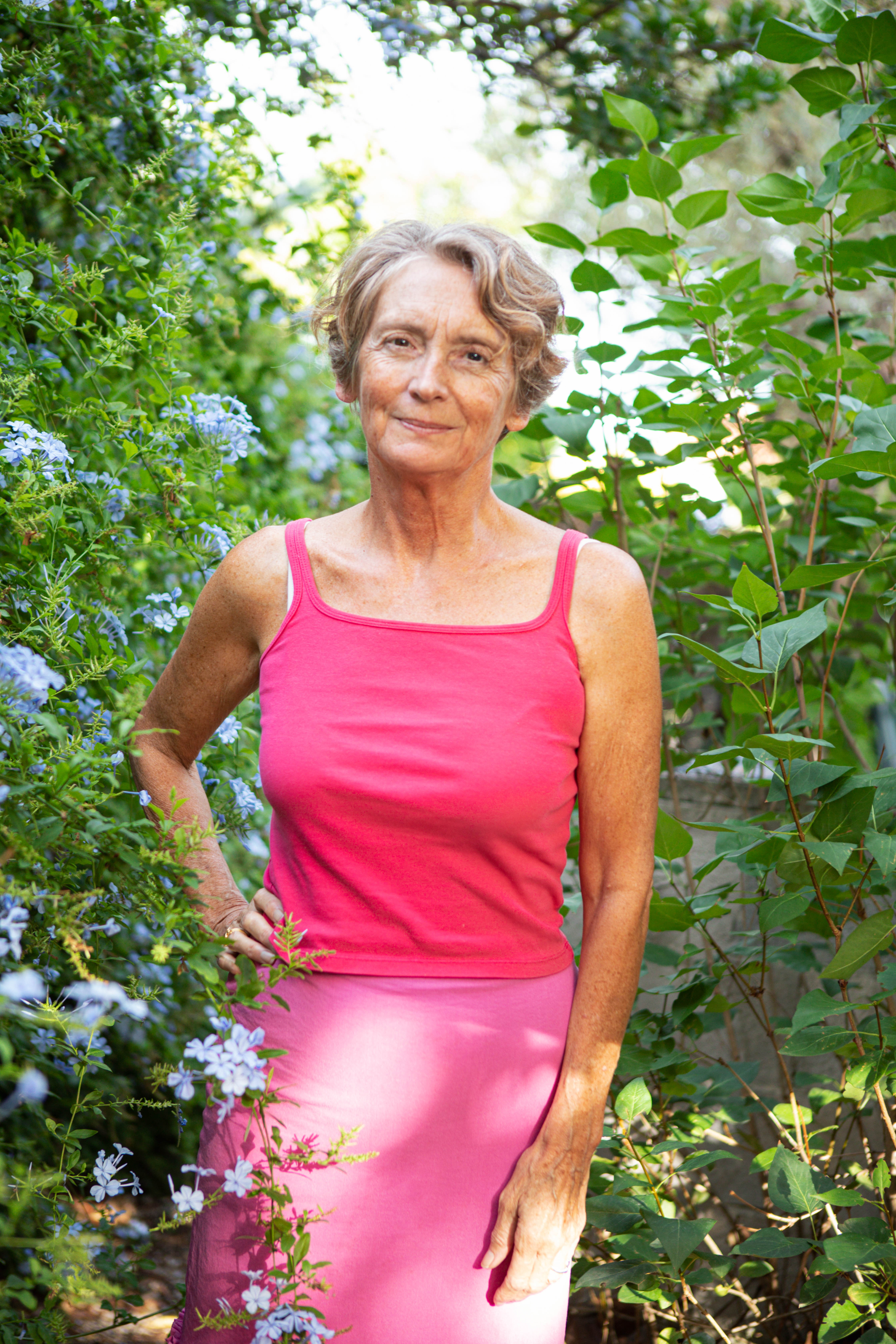

Françoise Romand is a French filmmaker.

Filmed in 1985, Romand's Mix-Up ou Méli-Mélo attained success in the United States after it was discovered by Vincent Canby of the New York Times. Journalist Jonathan Rosenbaum, of the Chicago Reader, selected it as the top film among his 10 best films of 1988, among his 15 best films of the 1980s and among the 10 best films by women directors. Romand's other films include Appelez-moi Madame (Call Me Madame) (1986), Thème Je (The Camera I) (2004), Baiser d'encre (Ink Kiss) (2015).

== Biography ==
Françoise Romand was born in Marseille. She studied cinema at IDHEC (1974). In 1987, she received a Villa Médicis Hors Les Murs in the USA and received a retrospective at the Film Center Art Institute at the Museum of Chicago in 1995.

From Mix-up ou Méli-mélo to Thème Je (The Camera I), she invented a new form of documentary which blends humor and fiction.

In 2000, after filming characters with peculiar life stories, Romand turned the camera on herself. Her subjects have included switched babies in Mix-Up, a communist poet becoming a woman with the help of his wife in Call Me Madame, the old twins of The Crumbs of Purgatory still living with their parents, the exchange of the lives of two heroines of Vice Vertu et Vice Versa', and amnesia in Passe-Compose. The Camera I echoes all these stories. Romand dissects family secrets, drags skeletons out of the closet, aims the camera on her lovers who hold mirrors up to her, with unflinching humor. She directs herself, mixing as always fiction and documentary. She believes that cinema is an art of illusion, that truth is a trap and that people shot on the fly are only phantoms. Digital cinema allows her to shoot outside of traditional production methods. The director had to sell her apartment after her year teaching at Harvard. Ciné-Romand which came out in 2009, is a mise-en-abyme of her previous films. Spectators were invited to discover themselves at a happening that mixes fiction and reality as domestic theater. Voyeurs are not always who we think they are. Romand takes her inspiration from L’Arroseur Arrosé (The Sprinkler Sprinkled), continuing the role of her great-grandfather from La Ciotat, the playful kid who bent the hose to stop the water. After filming the spectators and tenants of the apartments in which the documentary scenes were improvised, Françoise Romand integrated them fictionally into excerpts from previous films and it was reworked in the editing. Guests, spectators, hosts, angels-guides, actors and technicians - all become characters in this fiction documentary where Alice's looking glass reflects a mischievous fantasy where the roles were reversed and complemented one another.

She loves to work on sound with composers such as Nicolas Frize, Bruno Coulais, Jean-Jacques Birgé, as much as on images.

In 2020 Françoise Romand was awarded the Prix Charles Brabant (SCAM) for her career.

== Films ==
- 1977 Rencontres (Intersections), 21'
- 1985 Mix-Up ou Méli-Mélo (DVD Lowave) 63’
- 1986 Appelez-moi Madame (Call Me Madame) (DVD alibi) 52'
- 1992 Les miettes du purgatoire (The Crumbs of Purgatory) 14'
- 1993 Dérapage contrôlé 12'
- 1994 Passé-Composé 95' with Féodor Atkine, Laurence Masliah
- 1996 Vice Vertu et Vice Versa 87' with Florence Thomassin, Anne Jacquemin, Marc Lavoine
- 1997 L'enfant Hors-Taxes 26'
- 1999 Croisière sur le Nil 8 x 26'
- 2000 La règle du Je 15'
- 2000 Agnès Varda's Feet 5' with Agnès Varda
- 2001 ikitcheneye.com (website)
- 2002 La règle du je tu elle il 80'
- 2002 Iconoclash 26'
- 2003 Si toi aussi tu m'abandonnes 52'
- 2005 themeje.org (website)
- 2007-2008 Ciné-Romand (happening)
- 2008 22 ans plus tard... / Onboard 30' with Jean-Jacques Birgé
- 2009 Ciné-Romand (film, DVD alibi) 86’
- 2010 Sound of Vinyl 23'
- 2011 Gais Gay Games 30'
- 2011 Thème Je (The Camera I) 107'
- 2012 Teleromand (16 shorts among which La caméra change de main, Chacuns and Mix-Up Remix) 90'
- 2015 Baiser d'encre 92'
- 2018 Jiraïr 22'
- 2023 Ma vie de merde, 17'

== Other articles ==
- An Interview with Françoise Romand by Adam Hart (Senses of Cinema, Dec. 2004)
- (in French) Les fiches du cinéma on "Mix-Up" (6/8/2007)
- (in French) Les fiches du cinéma on "Call Me Madame" (12/31/2008)
- (in French) Étage Images by Isadora Dartial (Radio Nova, 11/30//2008)
- BFI, Sight and Sound, Lost and Found by Jonathan Rosenbaum on Mix-Up, 2010
- Gay Celluloid by Alan Hall on Gais Gay Games, 2011
- (in French) Romand, femme à la caméra, Eric Loret on Thème Je / The Camera I (Libération, 12/28/2011)
- (in Italian) Autofiction, tipico Romand, Silvana Silvestri (Il Manifesto, 3/9/2019)
