= Karine Saporta =

French choreographer, dancer, photographer, and short film director

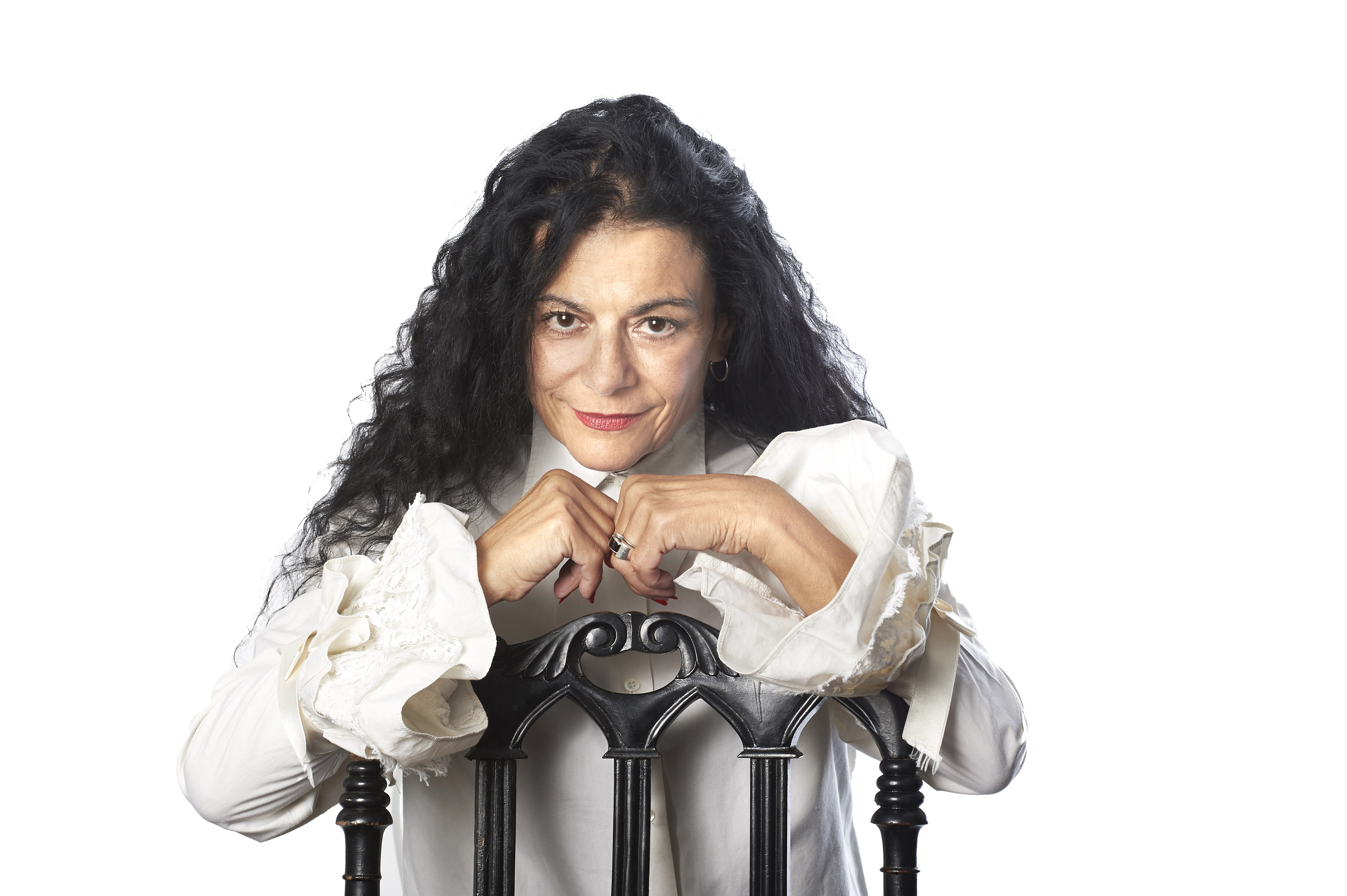
Image of Karine Saporta

Karine Saporta is a French choreographer, dancer, photographer, and short film director. She is one of the most prominent figures in French dance.

Saporta was born in France to a mother of Russian ancestry and a Spanish father. She began dancing at the age of five, studying ballet at first, and attending the National Conservatory. She graduated with a degree in philosophy and a master's degree in sociology from the University of Paris, then traveled to the United States to study choreography and movement composition.

She founded the Compagnie Karine Saporta in order to redefine contemporary modern dance. Her choreography is influenced by Indian dance and urban/hip hop dance as well as other dance forms from around the world. She is also interested in improvisation.

She is a professor at the Art and Music Department of the University of Evry, president of the Dance Commission, vice-president of the Society of Dramatic Authors and Composers in France (SACD), and artistic director of choreographic performances at the Festival d'Avignon.

She became Director of the Centre Choreographic National (CCN) of Caen/Basse-Normandie in 1989. She choreographed the dances in the 1991 Peter Greenaway film Prospero's Books. She has also choreographed to music by Michael Nyman in her opera-ballet La Princesse de Milan.

She is a Chevalier of the Légion d’Honneur.
