= Niort =

Prefecture and commune in Nouvelle-Aquitaine, France

Niort Niàu (Poitevin–Saintongeais)
- Prefecture and commune
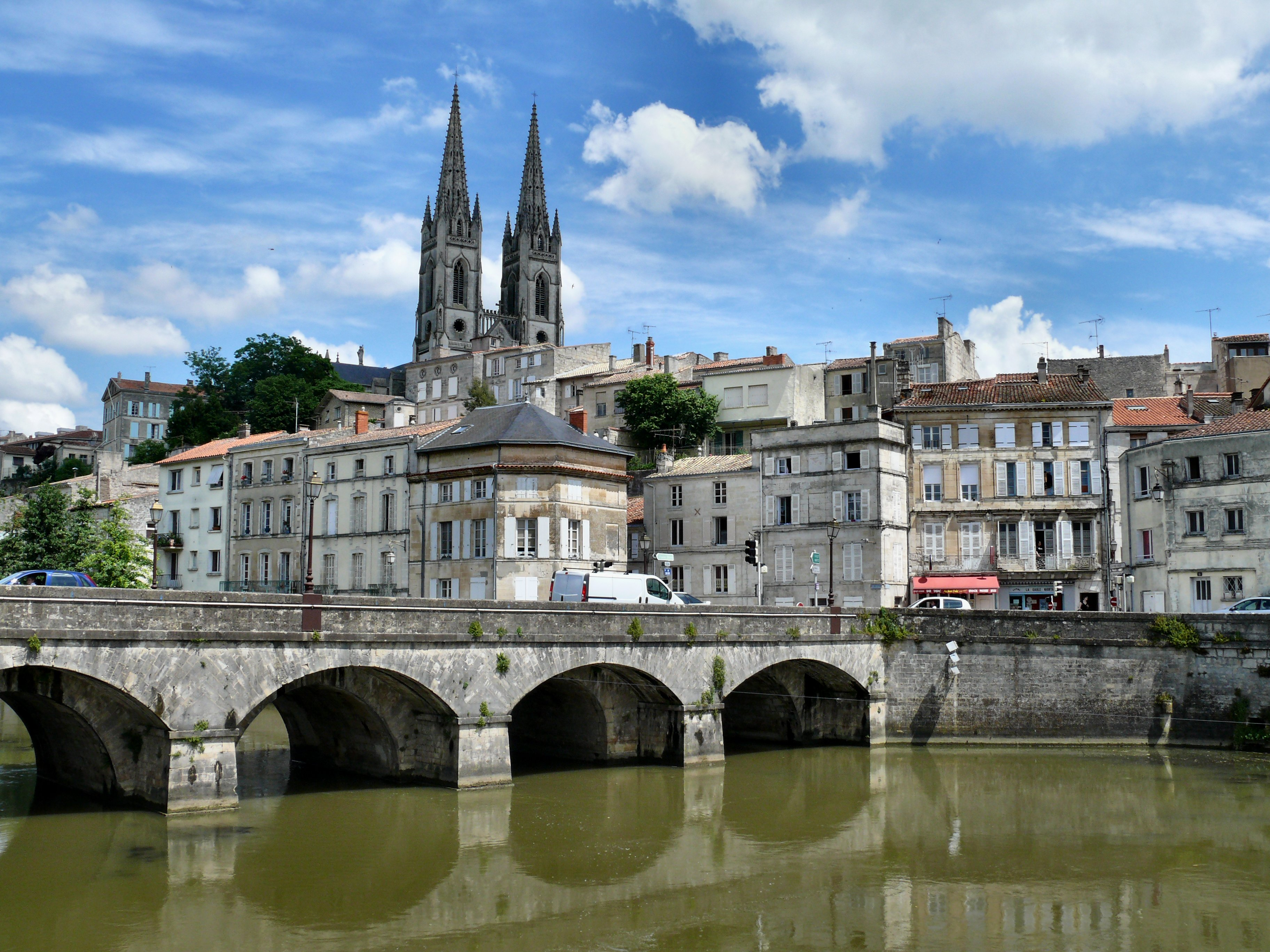

- Coat of arms
- Location of Niort
- Location within France Location within Nouvelle-Aquitaine
- Coordinates: 46°19′33″N 0°27′38″W
- Country: France
- Region: Nouvelle-Aquitaine
- Department: Deux-Sèvres
- Arrondissement: Niort
- Canton: 3 cantons
- Intercommunality: CA Niortais

Government
  - Mayor (2020–2026): Jérôme Baloge
- Area^{1}: 68.20 km^{2} (26.33 sq mi)
- Elevation: 28 m (92 ft)
- Highest elevation: 77 m (253 ft)
- Lowest elevation: 2 m (6.6 ft)
- Population (2023): 59,854
  - Density: 877.6/km^{2} (2,273/sq mi)
- Time zone: UTC+01:00 (CET)
  - Summer (DST): UTC+02:00 (CEST)
- INSEE/Postal code: 79191 /79000
- ^{1} French Land Register data, which excludes lakes, ponds, glaciers > 1 km^{2} (0.386 sq mi or 247 acres) and river estuaries.

Niort (French pronunciation: [njɔʁ]; Poitevin: Niàu; Occitan: Niòrt; Latin: Novioritum) is a commune in the Deux-Sèvres department, western France. It is the prefecture of Deux-Sèvres.

The population of Niort is 60,074 (2022) and about 180,000 people live in the urban area.

== Geography ==
The town is located on the river Sèvre Niortaise and is a centre of angelica cultivation in France. Near Niort at Maisonnay there is one of the tallest radio masts in France (height: 330 metres).

=== Transport ===
Niort has a railway station on the TGV route between Paris and La Rochelle, Gare de Niort. Direct TGV to Paris Montparnasse station takes 2 hours and 15 minutes. Niort is a road and motorway junction, connected to Paris and Bordeaux by the A10 motorway, with Nantes by the A83, and with La Rochelle by the N11. It is the largest French city to offer free mass transit.

== Population ==
The population data in the table and graph below refer to the commune of Niort proper, in its geography at the given years. The commune of Niort absorbed the former commune of Souché in 1964, Sainte-Pezenne in 1965, Saint-Florent in 1968 and Saint-Liguaire in 1971.

Historical population

Year	Pop.	±% p.a.
1793	11,515	—
1800	15,028	+3.88%
1806	15,066	+0.04%
1821	15,499	+0.19%
1831	17,000	+0.93%
1836	18,197	+1.37%
1841	18,739	+0.59%
1846	18,604	−0.14%
1851	18,727	+0.13%
1856	20,037	+1.36%
1861	20,831	+0.78%
1866	20,775	−0.05%
1872	21,344	+0.45%
1876	20,923	−0.50%
1881	22,254	+1.24%
1886	23,015	+0.67%
1891	23,225	+0.18%
1896	23,674	+0.38%
1901	23,897	+0.19%

Year	Pop.	±% p.a.
1906	23,329	−0.48%
1911	23,775	+0.38%
1921	23,559	−0.09%
1926	25,721	+1.77%
1931	25,935	+0.17%
1936	27,830	+1.42%
1946	32,752	+1.64%
1954	33,167	+0.16%
1962	37,512	+1.55%
1968	48,469	+4.36%
1975	62,267	+3.64%
1982	58,203	−0.96%
1990	57,012	−0.26%
1999	56,663	−0.07%
2007	58,576	+0.42%
2012	57,607	−0.33%
2017	58,707	+0.38%
2023	59,854	+0.32%

Source: EHESS and INSEE (1968–2023)

== Economy ==
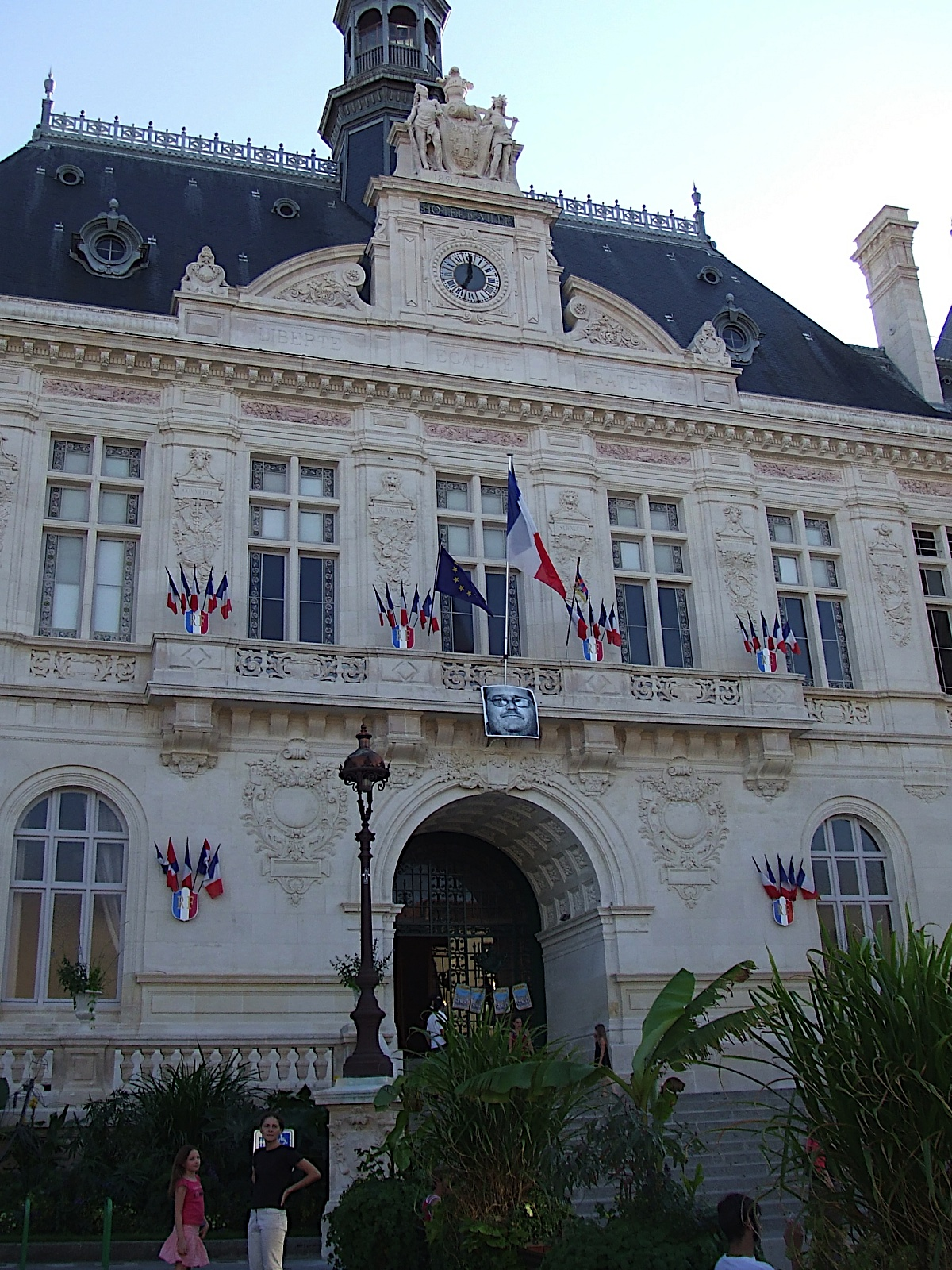
The Hôtel de Ville

Niort is the French capital of mutual insurance and bank companies, with the headquarters of MAAF, MAIF, MACIF, SMACL and regional branches of national mutual companies such as Groupama, Banque Populaire. Despite its small size, Niort is a main financial centre of France (ranked fourth after Paris, Lyon and Lille). Chemistry and aeronautics are the other main industries.

Niort is a major administrative and commercial centre. There has been a covered market in the town since at least the 13th century. The present-day Halles de Niort, a steel and glass pavilion atop a vaulted stone base building, opened in 1871 and has been listed as a monument historique since 1987.

The Hôtel de Ville was completed in May 1901.

== Notable people ==
Niort is or was the home or birthplace of the following people:

- Sir John Chandos (c1302-1369), English Knight of the Garter, lived at Niort 1361-1363 while he was governor of Aquitaine for King Edward III of England
- Françoise d'Aubigné, marquise de Maintenon (1635–1719), second wife of Louis XIV
- Adèle Chavassieu d'Audebert (1788–1838), painter
- Mickaël Brunet, footballer
- Mamadou Camara, footballer
- Aurélien Capoue, footballer
- Étienne Capoue, footballer
- Gaston Chérau (1872–1937), writer, a member of the Académie Goncourt
- Henri-Georges Clouzot (1904–1977), film director
- Paul Collomp (1885–1943), French hellenist and papyrologist
- Isabelle Druet (born 1979), mezzo-soprano
- Mathias Énard, author, winner of the Prix Goncourt
- Rima Hassan (born 1992 - arrived in the town in 2002), jurist and politician
- Mickaël James (born 1976), former professional footballer
- Jacques Antoine Marie de Liniers et Brémond (Santiago Antonio María de Liniers y Bremond) (1753–1810), Spanish Viceroy in the Río de la Plata
- Louis-Marcelin, marquis de Fontanes (1757–1821), poet and politician
- Achille-Félix Montaubry (1826–98), tenor singer associated with opéra comique and operetta
- Julien N'Da, footballer
- Olivier Sarr, basketball player
- Jean Sauvaget (1901–1950), historian and orientalist
- Philippe Souchard (born 1979), footballer
- Mathieu Texier (born 1981), footballer

== Fictional works ==
Niort is featured or mentioned in the following fictional works:

- Son Excellence Eugène Rougon, 1876, the sixth novel in the Rougon-Macquart series by Émile Zola.
- "Inspector Cadaver", 1944 Inspector Maigret novel by Georges Simenon
- Les Diaboliques, 1955 movie by Henri-Georges Clouzot
- Sérotonine, 2019 novel by Michel Houellebecq

== Sports ==
The football team is Chamois Niortais, which plays in National, the third-highest league in French football. Rugby team Stade Niortais celebrated its 100th anniversary in 2009. The city also is home to a professional basketball club named ASN Niort. The team plays at the second highest league in French basketball. The team celebrated its 100th birthday in 2021.

== Education ==
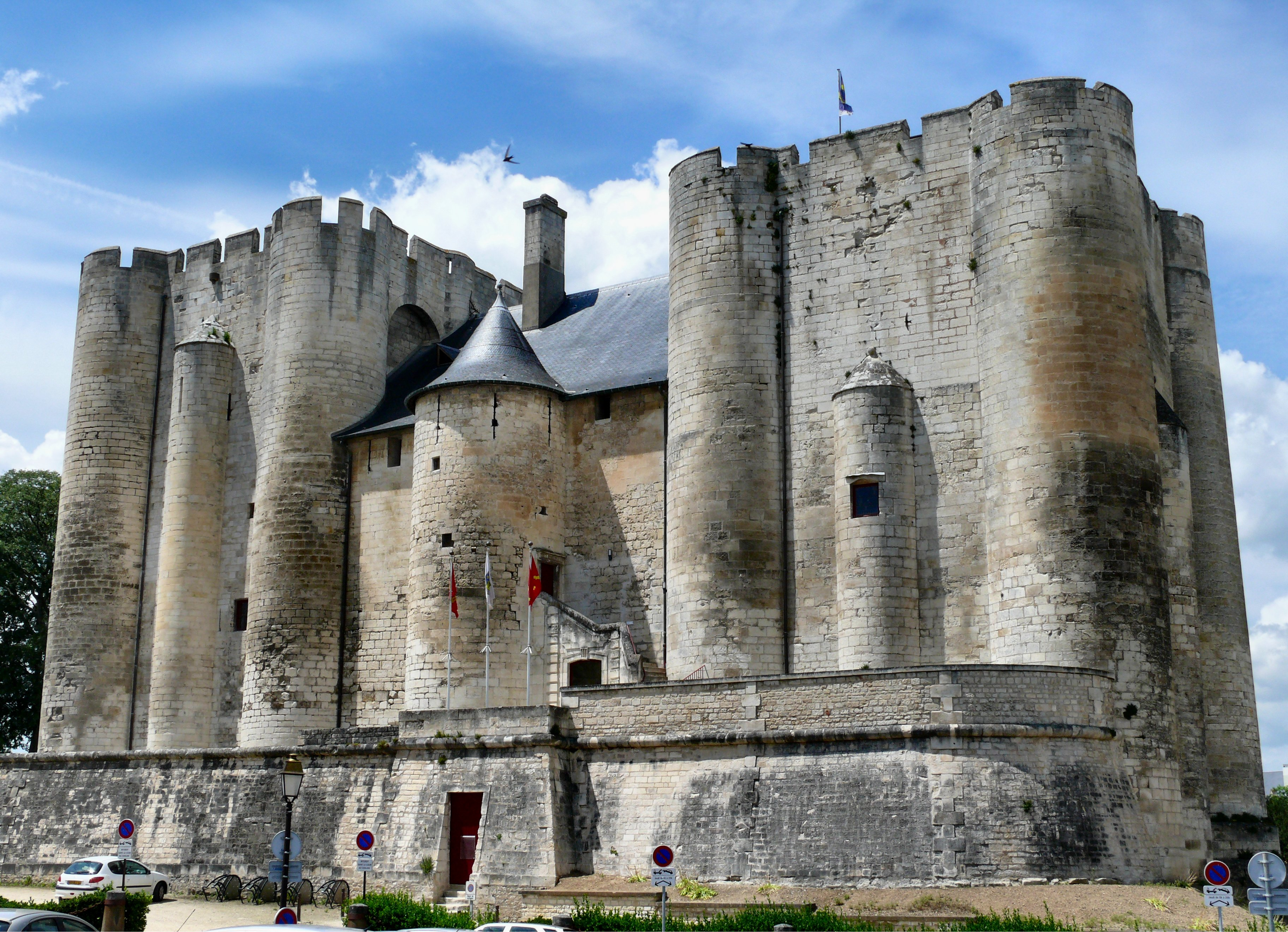
The old keep of Niort

Upper secondary schools:

- Lycée Jean Macé
- Lycée général, technologique et professionnel Paul Guérin
- Lycée de la Venise Verte
- Lycée professionnel Gaston Barré
- Lycée professionnel Thomas Jean Main
- Lycée de l'horticulture et du paysage
- Lycée Saint-André / Notre-Dame (private)

There is a post-secondary institution, Pôle universitaire de Niort.

== International relations ==
Niort is twinned with:

- Atakpamé, Togo, since 1958
- Coburg, Bavaria, Germany, since 1974
- Wellingborough, Northamptonshire, England, United Kingdom, since 1977
- Springe, Lower Saxony, Germany, since 1979
- (Castilla–La Mancha) Tomelloso, Ciudad Real, Castilla-La Mancha, Spain, since 1981
- Gijón, Asturias, Spain, since 1982
- Biała Podlaska, Lublin Voivodeship, Poland, since 1995

== Climate ==
Climate data for Niort (1991–2020 normals, extremes 1958–present)
Month	Jan	Feb	Mar	Apr	May	Jun	Jul	Aug	Sep	Oct	Nov	Dec	Year
Record high °C (°F)	17.0 (62.6)	24.3 (75.7)	25.5 (77.9)	29.8 (85.6)	34.0 (93.2)	40.1 (104.2)	41.0 (105.8)	40.1 (104.2)	36.6 (97.9)	31.1 (88.0)	22.9 (73.2)	19.2 (66.6)	41.0 (105.8)
Mean daily maximum °C (°F)	8.9 (48.0)	10.3 (50.5)	13.8 (56.8)	16.7 (62.1)	20.4 (68.7)	24.0 (75.2)	26.3 (79.3)	26.4 (79.5)	23.0 (73.4)	18.1 (64.6)	12.7 (54.9)	9.5 (49.1)	17.5 (63.5)
Daily mean °C (°F)	5.9 (42.6)	6.4 (43.5)	9.1 (48.4)	11.4 (52.5)	15.0 (59.0)	18.4 (65.1)	20.4 (68.7)	20.4 (68.7)	17.4 (63.3)	13.8 (56.8)	9.1 (48.4)	6.3 (43.3)	12.8 (55.0)
Mean daily minimum °C (°F)	2.8 (37.0)	2.4 (36.3)	4.3 (39.7)	6.1 (43.0)	9.6 (49.3)	12.8 (55.0)	14.6 (58.3)	14.4 (57.9)	11.8 (53.2)	9.5 (49.1)	5.6 (42.1)	3.2 (37.8)	8.1 (46.6)
Record low °C (°F)	−16.0 (3.2)	−13.3 (8.1)	−10.7 (12.7)	−4.8 (23.4)	−1.6 (29.1)	3.1 (37.6)	5.1 (41.2)	4.4 (39.9)	2.5 (36.5)	−3.3 (26.1)	−7.0 (19.4)	−10.5 (13.1)	−16.0 (3.2)
Average precipitation mm (inches)	81.9 (3.22)	64.1 (2.52)	63.4 (2.50)	66.7 (2.63)	66.5 (2.62)	58.8 (2.31)	52.0 (2.05)	53.4 (2.10)	61.7 (2.43)	88.4 (3.48)	92.3 (3.63)	97.4 (3.83)	846.6 (33.33)
Average precipitation days (≥ 1.0 mm)	11.8	10.4	10.3	10.0	10.0	8.1	7.3	6.8	7.6	11.1	12.3	12.3	117.9
Mean monthly sunshine hours	76.0	108.3	159.5	187.4	219.1	240.7	257.2	247.8	206.5	133.6	92.7	77.2	2,005.8
Source: Meteociel

== See also ==
- Château de Niort
- Communes of the Deux-Sèvres department
- Pierre-Marie Poisson Niort War Memorial
- Sérotonine (novel)
