= Halles de Niort =

Niort Indoor Market
- Les Halles de Niort
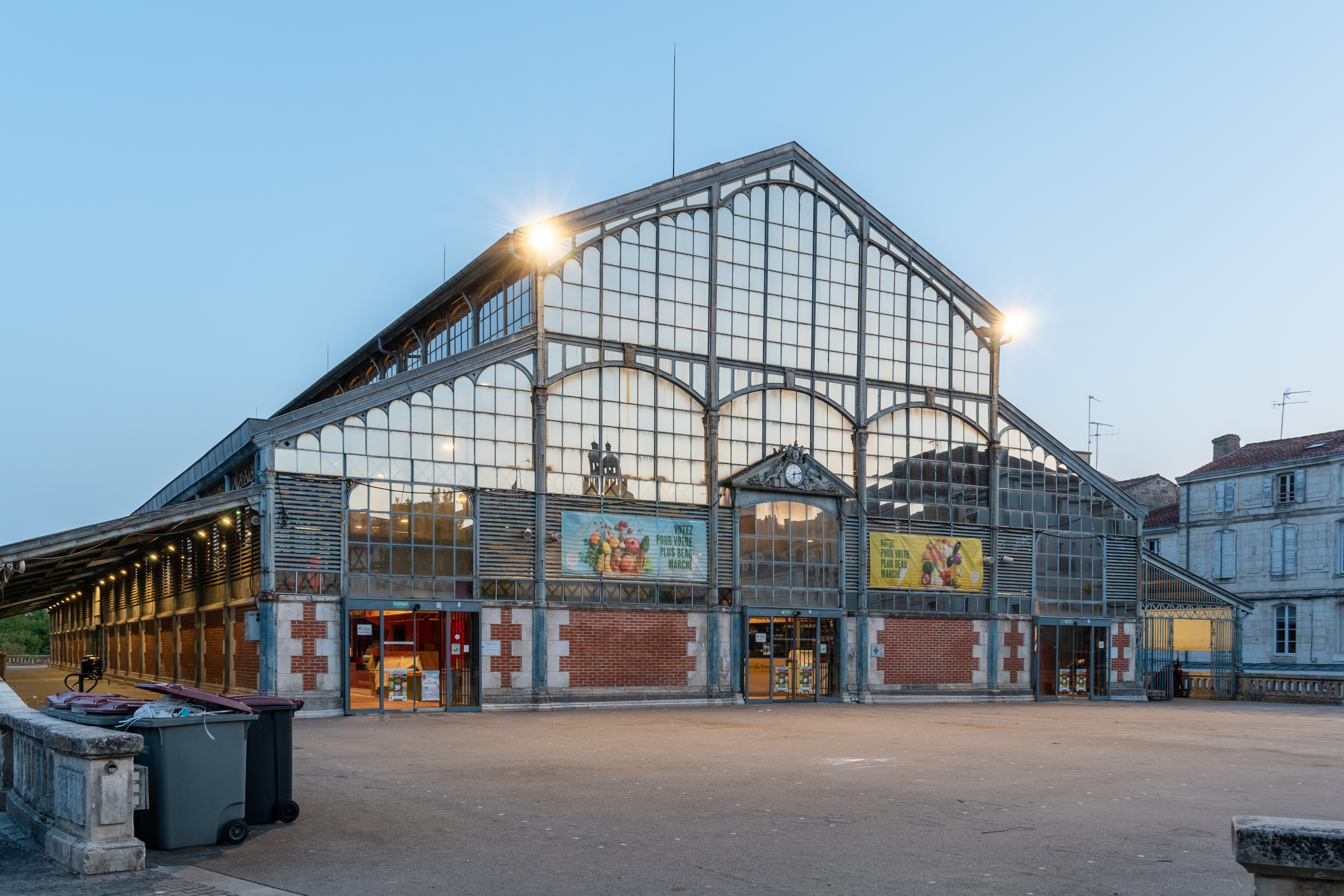
- Halles de Niort in 2023
- Interactive map of the Niort Indoor Market area

General information
- Location: Place des Halles, Niort
- Coordinates: 46°19′32″N 0°27′50″W
- Year built: 1868–1871
- Opened: 2 September 1871
- Inaugurated: 1 September 1871
- Cost: 280,000 francs

Technical details
- Material: Stone (base structure); glass and steel (pavilion)
- Size: 100 m × 160 m (base structure); 26 m × 72 m (pavilion)

Design and construction
- Architect: Simon Durand
- Engineer: Aubert Frères (base structure); Bataille & Périsset (pavilion)

Monument historique
- Designated: 14 May 1987
- Reference no.: PA00101285

Les Halles de Niort (French pronunciation: [le al də njɔʁ], English: Niort Indoor Market) is a market hall in the town of Niort, in the French department of Deux-Sèvres. Niort has had covered markets since the 13th century and there have been three structures known as the "Halles de Niort". The original market buildings were located in the centre of the town on what is now Rue Victor Hugo, a pedestrianised shopping street. After these were demolished in 1793, Niort's market moved to its present site on the banks of the Sèvre Niortaise. The current building, consisting of a metal and glass pavilion atop a stone-built base, was inaugurated in 1871. It was inscribed as a monument historique and listed in the Base Mérimée in 1987.

== Previous market halls in Niort ==
The town of Niort has a long history of indoor markets dating back to at least the 13th century, when Alphonse of Poitiers commissioned the construction of a market on land he owned in the centre of the town, close to the port and the Château de Niort. This structure, which replaced the old open-air market on Place Chanzy, close to the Église Saint-André, was built between 1255 and 1261. King Jean II the Good in 1354 declared Niort's market to be "the most beautiful rabble in the kingdom" ("la plus belle cohue du royaume"). The building stood for more than 100 years before being severely damaged by a storm in 1377.

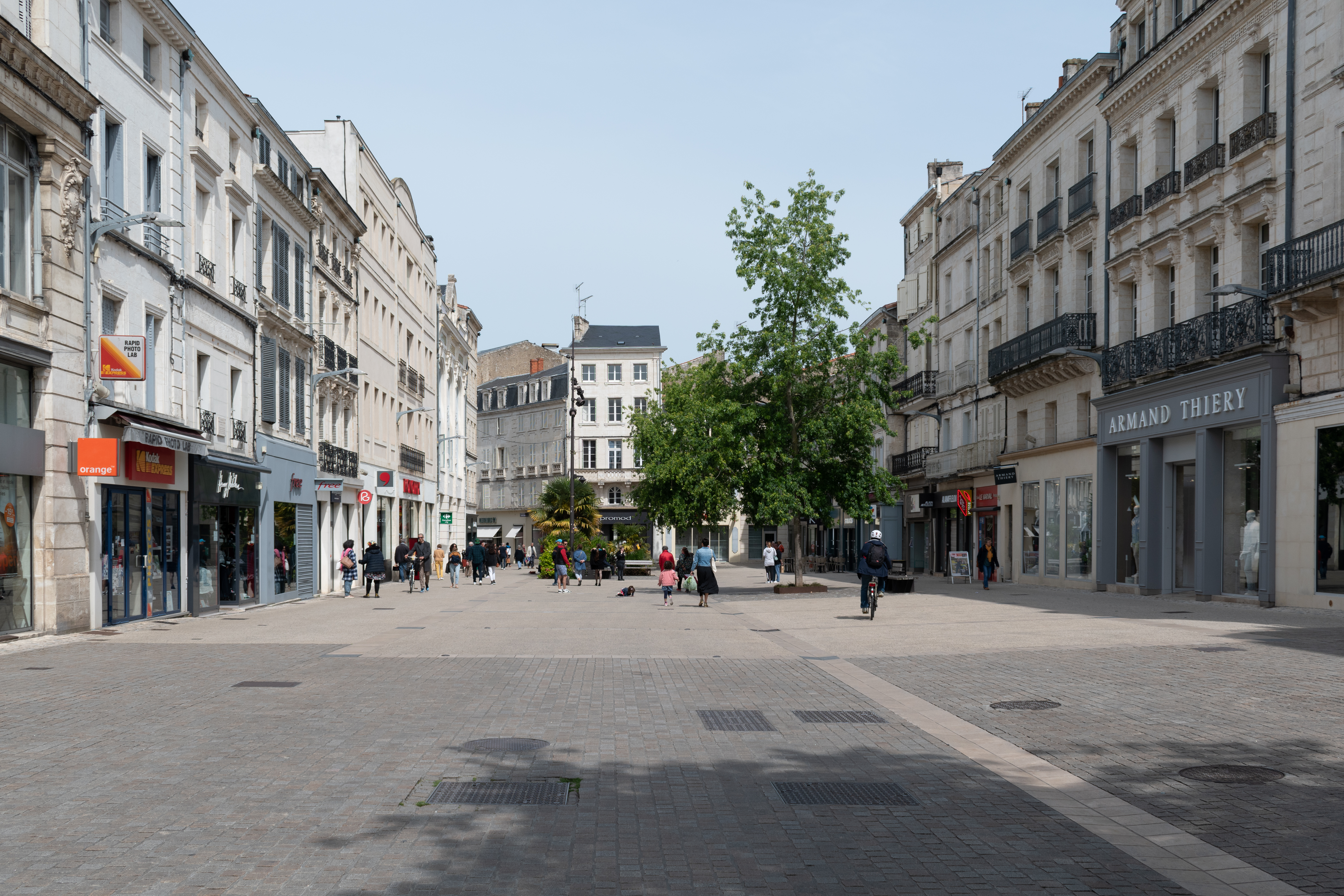
Rue Victor Hugo, the site of Niort's first covered market, as seen in 2023

Over the course of the late 14th and early 15th centuries, a new market building was erected on the same site, funded by the Duke of Berry. This second iteration became known as the halles and measured 156 metres in length by 24 metres in width. Its floorplan comprised three rows of pillars—each approximately three metres high—forming two wide aisles; the general outline of these can still be seen in the paving stones on the present-day street. The rebuilt market was successful and in 1412 the Duke of Berry transferred the rights to all the custom and trade of the Sèvre and Vendée rivers from Fontenay-le-Comte to Niort. Parts of the market were also reserved for foreign traders, in order to encourage international business. Local historian Hilaire-Alexandre Briquet, in his Histoire de la ville de Niort, described Niort's market hall as the largest and most convenient in France at that time. The building remained in this location for the next three centuries, but was dismantled in 1793 in order to make way for increased traffic through the town. The thoroughfare created by the removal of the market hall was originally called Rue de l'Unité, was renamed Rue des Halles in 1825 and finally became Rue Victor Hugo in 1885.

After around a decade without a dedicated market building, the mayor of Niort, Thomas Brisson, ordered the construction of a new hall on a plot of waste ground around 200 metres northwest of the old site, on the eastern bank of the Sèvre. This opened in 1803 and contained, among other things, a grain store, various grocers, fishmongers, butchers and an abattoir. In October of the same year Rue du Canon, the street running along the northeast side of the market site, was renamed Rue Brisson in the mayor's honour by the prefect of the Deux-Sèvres department, Claude-François-Étienne Dupin. The market hall was unpopular with traders and townspeople alike, in particular due to the unsanitary conditions caused by waste from the abattoir being discharged into the river. As early as 1834, the council recognised the need for a new building but lacked the funds to build one. In 1863, following a partial roof collapse, the hall was demolished.

== Current building ==
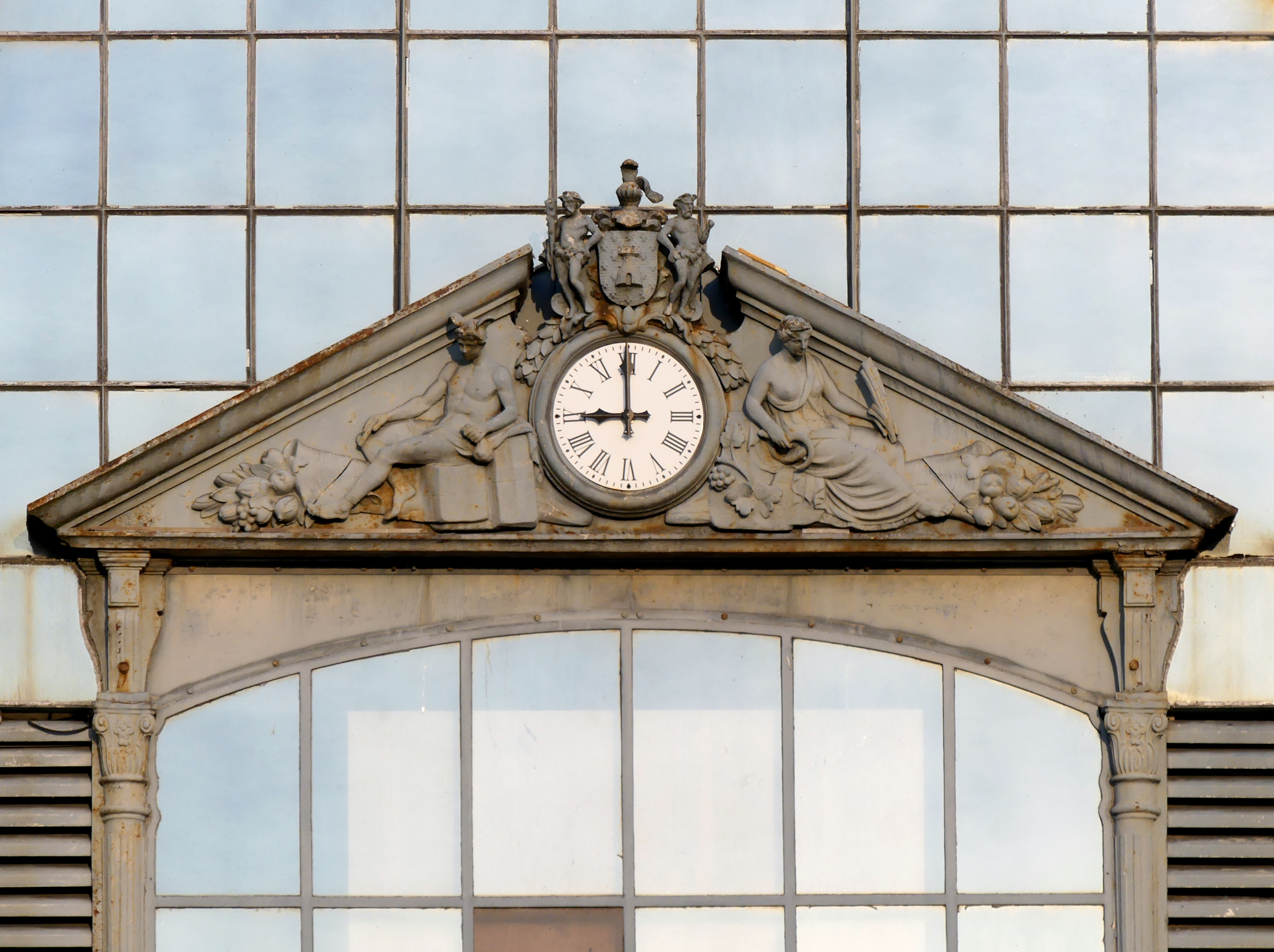
Pediment over the main entrance with reliefs of Mercury (left of the clock) and Ceres.

In July 1866, the town council and mayor Alfred Monnet launched a competition to design a new market hall for Niort. The winning entry was submitted by local engineer Simon Durand, whose design incorporated two contrasting elements: a vaulted stone structure as a base, with a metal and glass pavilion atop it. Durand's use of modernistic materials was inspired by the designs of architect Victor Baltard, in particular his work at Les Halles in Paris. Two firms were brought in to work on the new building; Aubert Frères constructed the foundations and base structure, while the pavilion was erected by Bataille & Périsset. The work took three years and cost 280,000 francs to complete. The new market hall was inaugurated on 1 September 1871 and opened to the public the following day.

The stone base structure was originally used for the storage and sale of grain and flour. The glass and metal pavilion housing the main market hall is of a modular design, with 80 pillars forming the perimeter and a further 20 interior pillars supporting the roof. It has a church-like structure, with a large central "nave" flanked by two smaller side aisles. The roof is fitted with a skylight to allow natural light to enter and its height of 12 metres was chosen to avoid a build up of humidity inside. The main entrance to the market hall is adorned with additional columns and a pediment featuring a clock and reliefs of Mercury, the Roman god of commerce, and Ceres, the goddess of agriculture. Covered walkways flanking the longer sides of the pavilion were added in the late 1920s, (Note: Different years are given by the various sources: 1927, 1928 and 1929.) and the building was electrified in 1950. The market complex was inscribed (a level of protection granted to buildings and objects of regional importance) to the list of historic monuments on 14 May 1987.

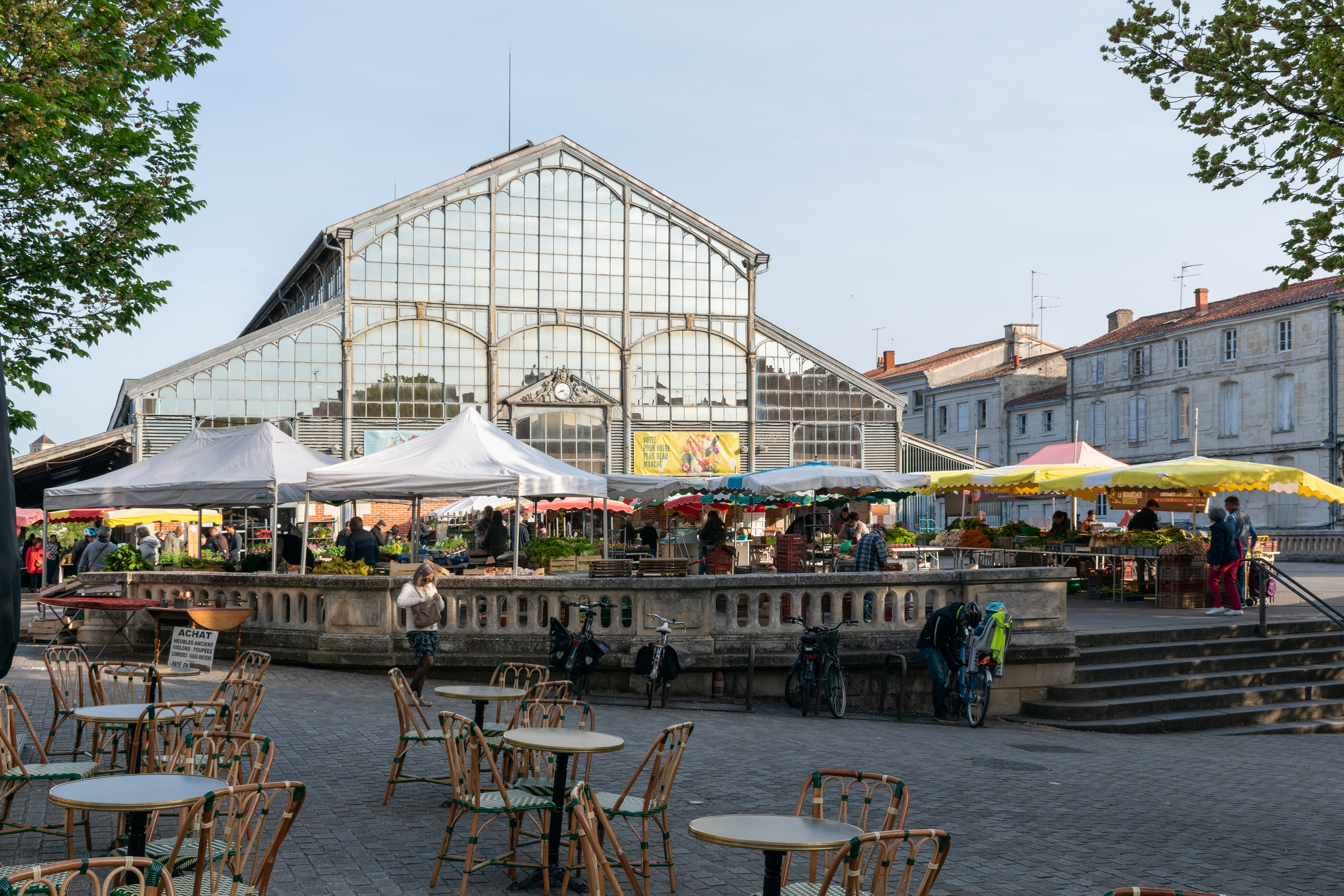
Thursday market at the Halles de Niort in 2023

In 2019, the Halles de Niort was named as the most beautiful market in the Poitou-Charentes region, and ninth in France overall, as part of television network TF1's annual competition for the country's best kept market halls. To commemorate the building's 150th anniversary in 2021, a series of events were staged including a photography contest and a music festival; stallholders were also invited to wear costumes from the 1870s.

As of 2023, the covered part of the market is open six days per week and hosts around 60 traders, mostly selling meat, fish, fruits and vegetables. On Thursdays, Saturdays and Sundays, an additional 50–60 stallholders trade on the square in front of the pavilion and the adjoining Place du Donjon. The units in the stone base structure formerly used for the storage and sale of grain now house several shops, public toilets, a bar, and formerly a tourist information centre.
