= Auguste Gaspard Louis Desnoyers =

French engraver (1779–1857)

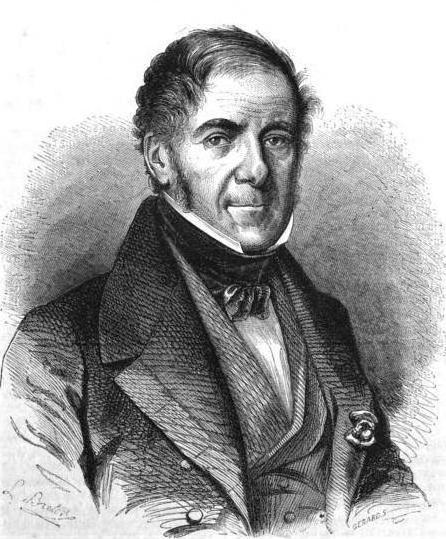
Engraving of Auguste Gaspard Louis Desnoyers (1862)

Auguste Gaspard Louis, Baron Boucher-Desnoyers (19 December 1779 in Paris – 16 February 1857), was one of the most eminent of modern French engravers.

== Biography ==
His father held the office of commissary-general in the military household of Monsieur, afterwards Louis XVIII, but through unforeseen misfortunes young Desnoyers was compelled to choose for himself a career. He elected entrance into the corps of engineers, but he devoted every moment he could spare from the study of mathematics to drawing. At the age of twelve, he was introduced to Lethière, who admitted him into his studio, where Desnoyers soon attracted notice. But the rapid progress he made in drawing was just the means to an end. This end was soon accomplished, for the engraver Darcis, who had seen a Head of a Magdalen, which Desnoyers engraved on tin when scarcely ten years old, took him under his care, and employed him on the outlines of the plates after Carle Vernet, on which he was then engaged. In 1796 an engraving in the dotted style of a Young Bacchante, from a drawing by Grevedon, met with a success far beyond the hopes of the young artist.

He next produced a number of small subjects of similar character, which were well received, and at the Salon of 1799 he exhibited his engraving of Venus disarming Cupid, after Robert Lefèvre, which won a prize of 2000 francs. In this year he entered the studio of Alexandre Tardieu, where he made some studies in etching and line engraving; but an engagement to engrave Hilaire Ledru's Pénibles Adieux did not allow him to remain for any great length of time. The success of his line engraving of "Hope supporting Man to the Tomb," after a sketch by Caraffa exhibited at the Salon of 1801, procured him a commission to engrave for the Musée La belle jardinière of Raphael.

Just at this time Desnoyers was drawn in the conscription, and Lucien Bonaparte went to Napoleon, his brother, to solicit the artist's exemption. "Has he worked hand in hand with the Republic?" asked the First Consul, in very bad humour. "Yes," said Lucien. "Well, then let him pay if he wishes to be replaced," abruptly replied Napoleon. The council of revision, however, fortunately deemed him unfit for military service, although his constitution left nothing to be desired.

From this time he rose rapidly to the first rank in his adopted art, and in 1806 gained the large gold medal for his engraving of the celebrated antique cameo of 'Ptolemy II. Philadelphus and Arsinoe," belonging to the Empress Josephine, which is now in the Hermitage Palace at St. Petersburg.

His next important work was the full-length portrait of the Emperor Napoleon in his coronation robes, after Gérard. This engraving was exhibited at the Salon of 1810, and for it Desnoyers received no less a sum than £2000, together with the return of the plate after 600 impressions had been made.

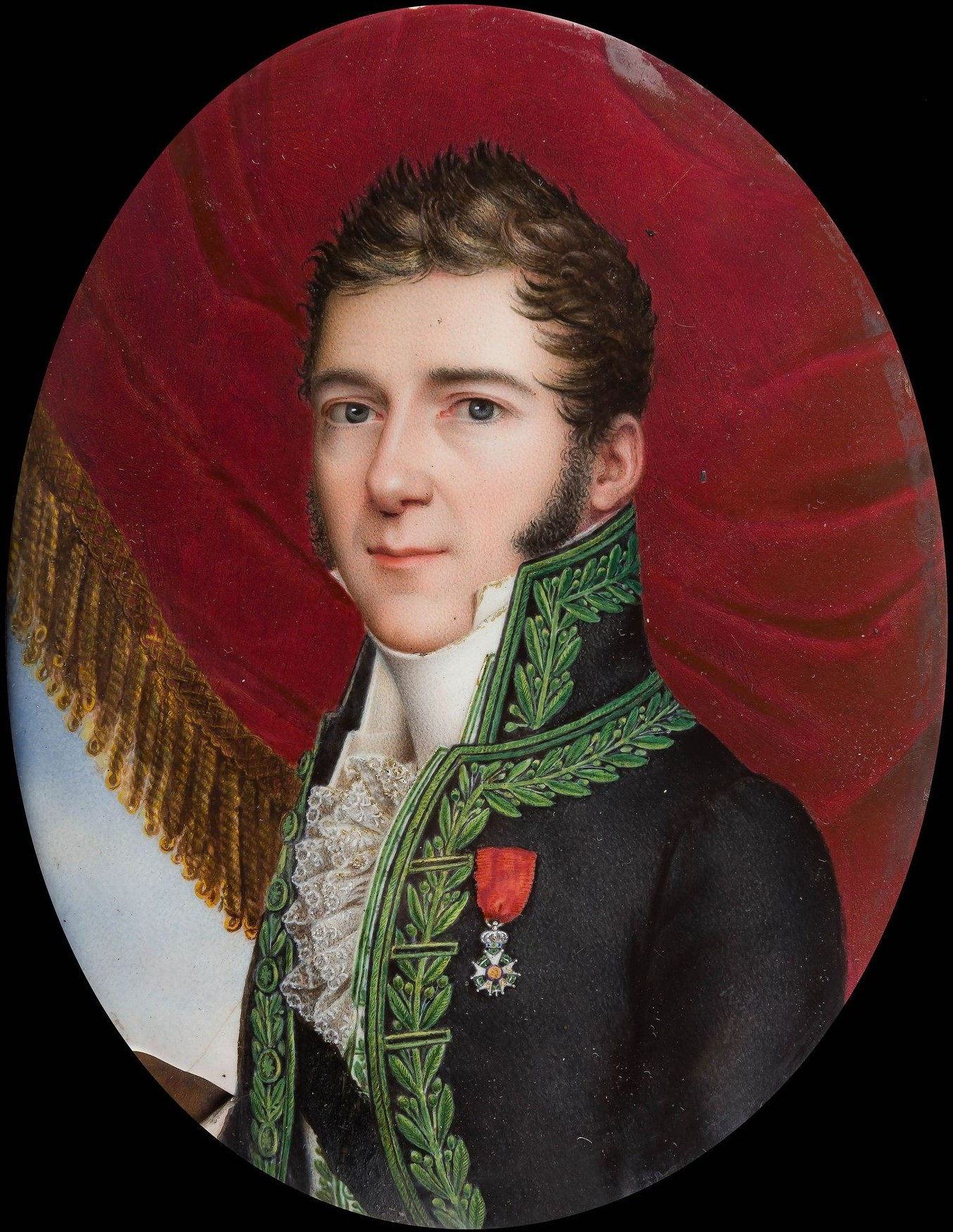
Portrait of Desnoyers by Adèle Chavassieu d'Audebert

Also in 1810, he engraved a small portrait of the Empress Marie Louise, which has a curious history. The Austrian princess had not set foot on French soil when her portrait was being sold in Paris by thousands. The likenesses differed, but all were frightfully ugly. Napoleon in a rage sent in the middle of the night for Baron Denon, and commanded him to go instantly to Desnoyers and ask him to engrave the portrait of the future empress. "Round head, fair hair, high forehead," were the brief instructions sent to the artist, who worked day and night until, at the end of four days, a proof was ready for approval. The emperor thought it superb, and had already ordered its immediate publication, when he received a faithful miniature of the archduchess, which rendered an alteration of the plate imperative, for the face of the new empress, instead of being round, was a very elongated oval. Twenty impressions were made when Desnoyers again set to work, and the next day the authentic portrait of Marie Louise was in circulation throughout Paris.

The empire fell, but the talented engraver continued to enjoy the favour of the court, and held a position among engravers similar to that of Baron Gérard among painters, and of Baron Bosio among sculptors. Elected a member of the Institute in 1816, he was appointed engraver to the king in 1825, and created a Baron in 1828, receiving soon after the cross of an officer of the Legion of Honour. He engraved many of the masterpieces of the Louvre, but after 1848 he did but little, for age had enfeebled his hand and weakened his sight.

Desnoyers died in Paris on 16 February 1857. He appears to the best advantage in his transcripts of the works of ancient masters, especially Raphael, whose characteristics he renders with the greatest truth and skill. His masterpieces are the La Belle Jardinière of Raphael, and the Vierge aux rochers of Leonardo da Vinci. But, although marked by exceptional talent, his line engravings lack the freedom and breadth that distinguish those he executed in the dotted style. The landscape backgrounds of his plates were for the most part engraved by Friedrich Giessler of Nuremberg.

== Works ==
Among Desnoyers's works the first place must be assigned to his engravings after the Madonnas of Raphael. These are as follow:

- La Belle Jardinière. 1804.
- La Vierge au Donataire. 1814.
- La Vierge au Linge. 1814.
- La Madonna della Sedia. 1814.
- La Madonna del Pesce. 1822. (pictured)
- La Madonna della Oasa d'Alba. 1837.
- La Vierge au Berceau. 1831 .
- La Belle Jardinière de Florence. 1841.
- La Madonna di San Sisto. 1846. (pictured)

Desnoyers's other works include:

- The Visitation; after Raphael. 1824.
- St. Catharine of Alexandria; after the same. 1824.
- The Transfiguration; after the same. 1840.
- La Vierge aux rochers; after Leonardo da Vinci. 1812.
- The Holy Family; after the same.
- The Magdalen; after Correggio.
- Eliezer and Rebekah; after Poussin. 1819.
- Moses rescued from the Waters; after the same. (The landscape engraved by Filhol and Niquet.)
- Venus disarming Cupid; after Robert Lefèvre; in dotted manner. 1799.
- The Muses and the Pierides: after Perino del Vaga. 1831.
- Cupid and Psyche and 'Cupid bending his bow'; after drawings by Ingres from antique sculpture; in the 'Musée Français.' 1808.
- Ptolemy II. Philadelphus and Arsinoe; after a drawing by Ingres from an antique cameo.
- Belisarius; after Gérard. 1806.
- Francis I and his sister, Margaret of Navarre; after Richard. 1817.
- Hope supporting Man to the Tomb; after Caraffa. 1801.
- Les Pénibles Adieux; after Hilaire Ledru; in dotted manner. 1802.
- Napoleon Bonaparte, First Consul; after Robert Lefèvre. 1802.
- Napoleon I, Emperor of the French; full-length; after Gérard. 1808.
- Marie Louise, Empress of the French. 1810.
- Napoleon, King of Rome; after Gérard.
- Baron Alexander von Humboldt; an etching; after a sketch by Gérard. 1806.
- Thomas Jefferson, President of the United States of America; in dotted manner. 1801.
- Charles Maurice de Talleyrand-Perigord, Prince of Benevento; full-length; after Gérard. 1814.

== Gallery ==
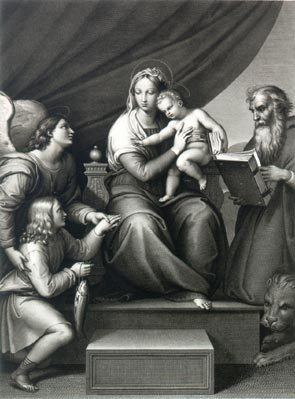
Madonna del Pesce, after Raphael (1822)

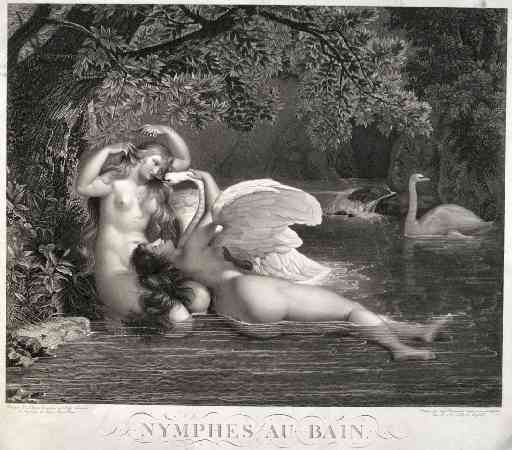
Nymphs bathing,
after Lethier (1830)

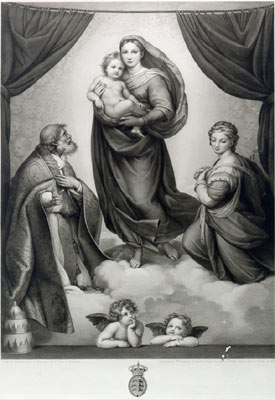
Sistine Madonna, after Raphael (1841)

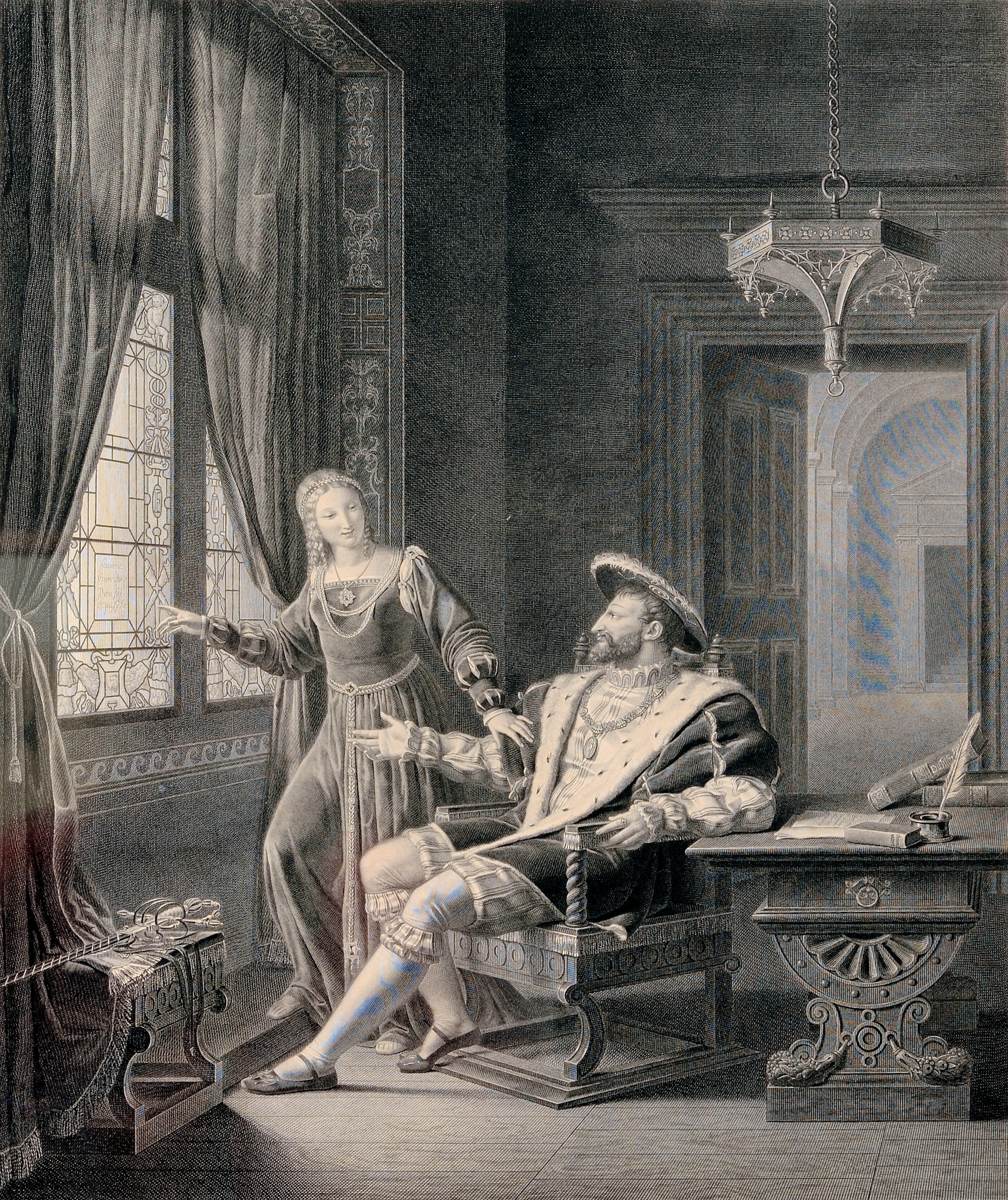
Francis I with Marguerite de Navarre, after Richard (1817)
