= Adèle Chavassieu d'Audebert =

French painter (1788-1838)

Adélaïde-Françoise Chavassieu d'Audebert, also known as Chavassieu d'Haudebert and Mlle Chavassieu, (1788–1838) was a French painter, specialising primarily in enamel, active in the early 19th century. She exhibited her works in Paris between 1810 and 1824 and was awarded a gold medal for her work.

== Life ==
Adèle Chavassieu d'Audebert was born in 1788 in Niort, a commune in western France. She studied painting under Auguste Desnoyers in Paris and maintained her studio first on the Right Bank, near the Louvre, before relocating several times within Saint-Germain-des-Prés. By 1831 her studio was at 20 Rue de la Chaise. She died in early 1838.

== Chavassieu d'Aubert family name ==
Chavassieu, sometimes spelled Chavassieux, is surname strongly associated with the Loire region, particularly Montbrison. Several branches of the family held prominent legal and administrative positions, including lawyers and court officials. The Chavassieu d'Audebert line in the 18th century included Nicolas Chavassieu d'Audebert, a senior court lawyer, and his wife Catherine Fauvel. Adèle may have been a close relative of theirs, as well as of their son Georges-Daniel Chavassieu d'Audebert, a royal notary.

== Works ==
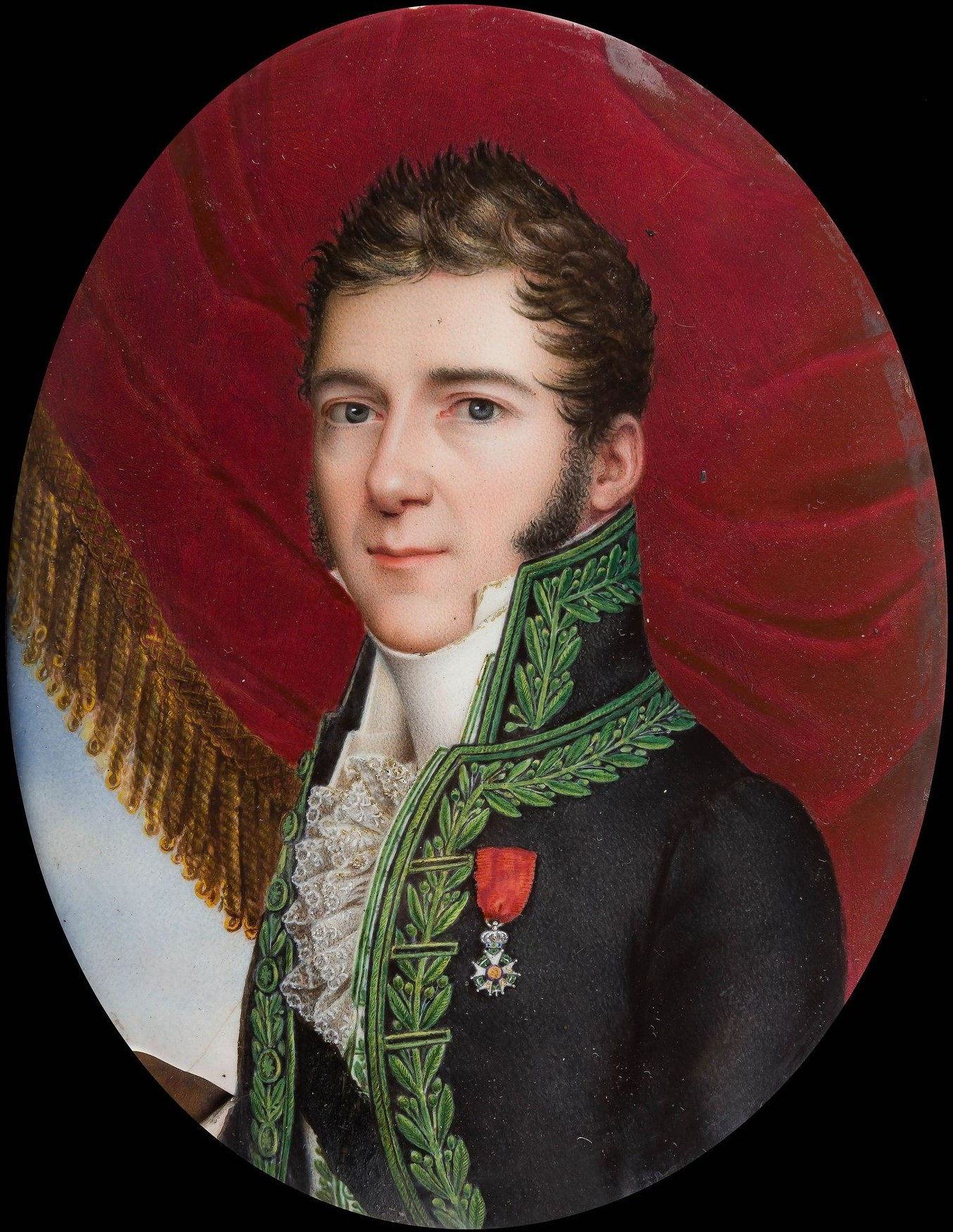
Chavassieu's portrait of her teacher Auguste Desnoyers

Chavassieu's work included large-scale religious paintings, such as two panels- one in the Cathedral of Chartres and another in the church of Notre-Dame at Avranches- as well as numerous full-length portraits and depictions of mythological and historical subjects.

Chavassieu d'Audebert produced over ninety enamel pieces inspired by the gallery of the Comte de Sommariva, exhibited in 1810, 1812, and 1814. Notable works included:

- Sagesse préservant l’Adolescence des faits de l’Amour (Wisdom Protecting Adolescence from the Deeds of Love, after Meynier)
- Psyché enlevée par les Zéphyrs (Psyche Carried Away by the Zephyrs, after Prud'hon)
- Cléopâtre et Jules César (Cleopatra and Julius Caesar, after Angelica Kauffmann)
- Bélisaire (Belisarius, after Gérard)
- Vénus qui caresse l'Amour (Venus Caressing Cupid, after Appiani)
- La colère d'Achille (The Anger of Achilles, after Appiani)
- La duchesse de Berry (The Duchess of Berry, 1822)
- L'Amour et Psyché (Cupid and Psyche, after David)
- Vénus et Ascagne (Venus and Ascanius, after Ménard)
- Le repos de la Sainte-Famille (The Rest of the Holy Family, after Pesne)
- La Vierge à la chaise (The Virgin of the Chair, after Raphael, 1824)

She also created enamel portraits of prominent figures, including the Duchess of Berry and her children.

In recognition of her work, Chavassieu d'Audebert was awarded a gold medal at the 1824 exhibition, described as a prize of "encouragement".
