= Pierre Alexandre Tardieu =

French engraver

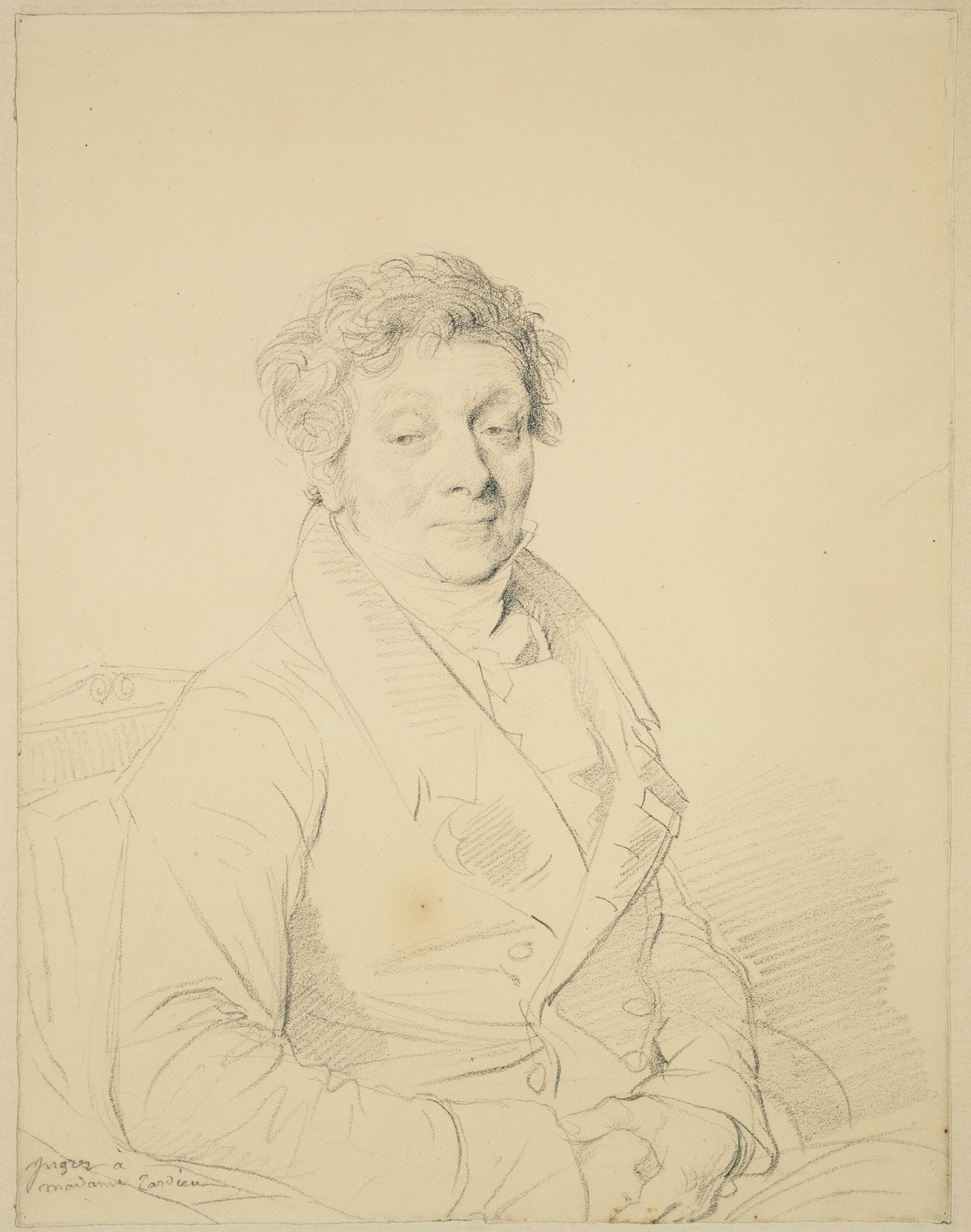
Portrait of Pierre Alexandre Tardieu by Ingres, circa 1825 (Art Institute of Chicago)

Pierre Alexandre Tardieu (1756–1844) was a French engraver.

He was a member of the Institut de France, the Saint Petersburg Academy and the Academy of Milan. His students included Auguste Gaspard Louis Desnoyers. He is buried at the cimetière du Père-Lachaise in Paris (2nd division).

== Biography ==
Tardieu was part of a family of engravers. His brothers were Antoine François Tardieu and Jean Baptiste Pierre Tardieu. His nephews Ambroise and Pierre Antoine Tardieu also worked in this industry.

He learned his craft from his uncle Jacques-Nicolas Tardieu and his godfather Johann Georg Wille. His role models were Gérard Edelinck and Robert Nanteuil. He was considered one of the few engravers who could also implement painted templates with great skill and fineness. He had many students, but especially Auguste Gaspard Louis Desnoyers stood out.

In 1822 he took over the seat of Charles Clément Balvay in the Académie des Beaux-Arts. In 1825 he was appointed Knight of Legion of Honor. Furthermore, he was a member of the Petersburg Academy and the Milan Academy.

== Sources ==
Media related to Pierre Alexander Tardieu at Wikimedia Commons

- Domenico Gabrielli, Dictionnaire historique du cimetière du Père-Lachaise (XVIIIe et XIXe siècles), l'Amateur (ed.), 2002
