= TV Mast Niort-Maisonnay =

French TV mast

Coordinates: 46°11′33″N 0°3′10″W

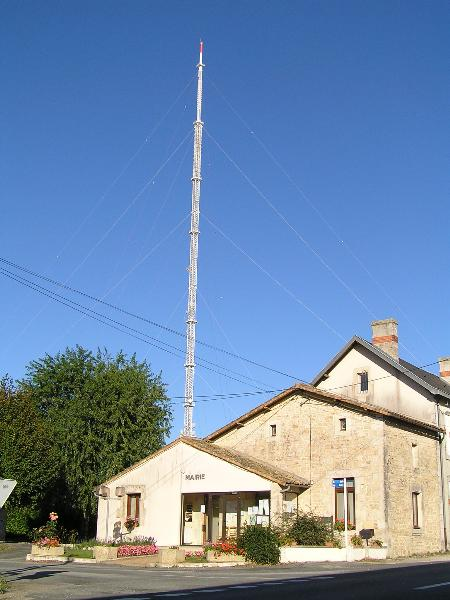
Maisonnay skyline

The TV Mast Niort-Maisonnay is a 330-metre-high (1,080 ft) guyed mast for TV transmission in Maisonnay, near Niort, France. Built in 1978, it is one of the tallest structures in France, taller than Eiffel Tower.

== See also ==
- List of tallest structures in the world
