= Mickaël James =

French footballer (born 1976)

Personal information
- Full name: Mickaël James
- Date of birth: September 28, 1976 (age 50)
- Place of birth: Niort, France
- Height: 1.76 m (5 ft 9 1/2 in)
- Position: Striker

Senior career*
Years	Team	Apps	(Gls)
1995–1999	Chamois Niortais	31	(4)
1999–2000	Angoulême	32	(8)
2000–2001	Thouars	36	(5)
2001–2002	Gap	?	(?)
2002–2006	Thouars	?	(?)
- * Club domestic league appearances and goals

Mickaël James (born September 28, 1976) is a former professional footballer who played as a striker. In 2018, he was hired as the manager of Le Réveil de Saint-Géréon.

== See also ==
- Football in France
- List of football clubs in France
