= Hôtel de Ville, Niort =

Town hall in Niort, France

Hôtel de Ville
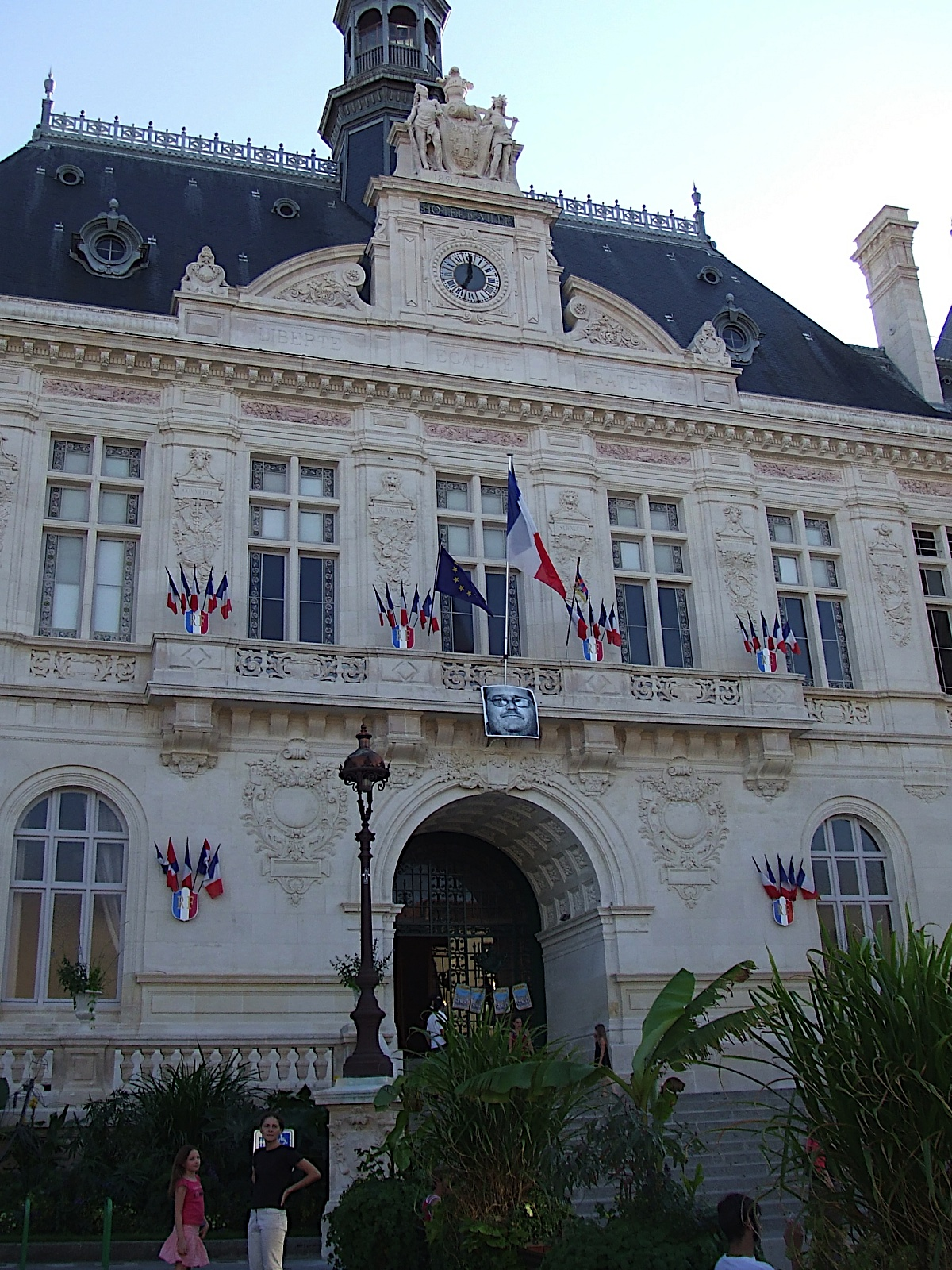
- The main frontage of the Hôtel de Ville in August 2008

General information
- Type: City hall
- Architectural style: Renaissance Revival style
- Location: Niort, France
- Coordinates: 46.3237°N 0.4648°W
- Completed: 1901

Design and construction
- Architect: Georges Lasseron

Monument historique
- Official name: Hôtel de ville
- Type: Inscrit
- Designated: 2015
- Reference no.: PA79000045

The Hôtel de Ville (French pronunciation: [otɛl də vil], City Hall) is a municipal building in Niort, Deux-Sèvres, western France, standing on Place Martin-Bastard. It was designated a monument historique by the French government in 2015.

== History ==
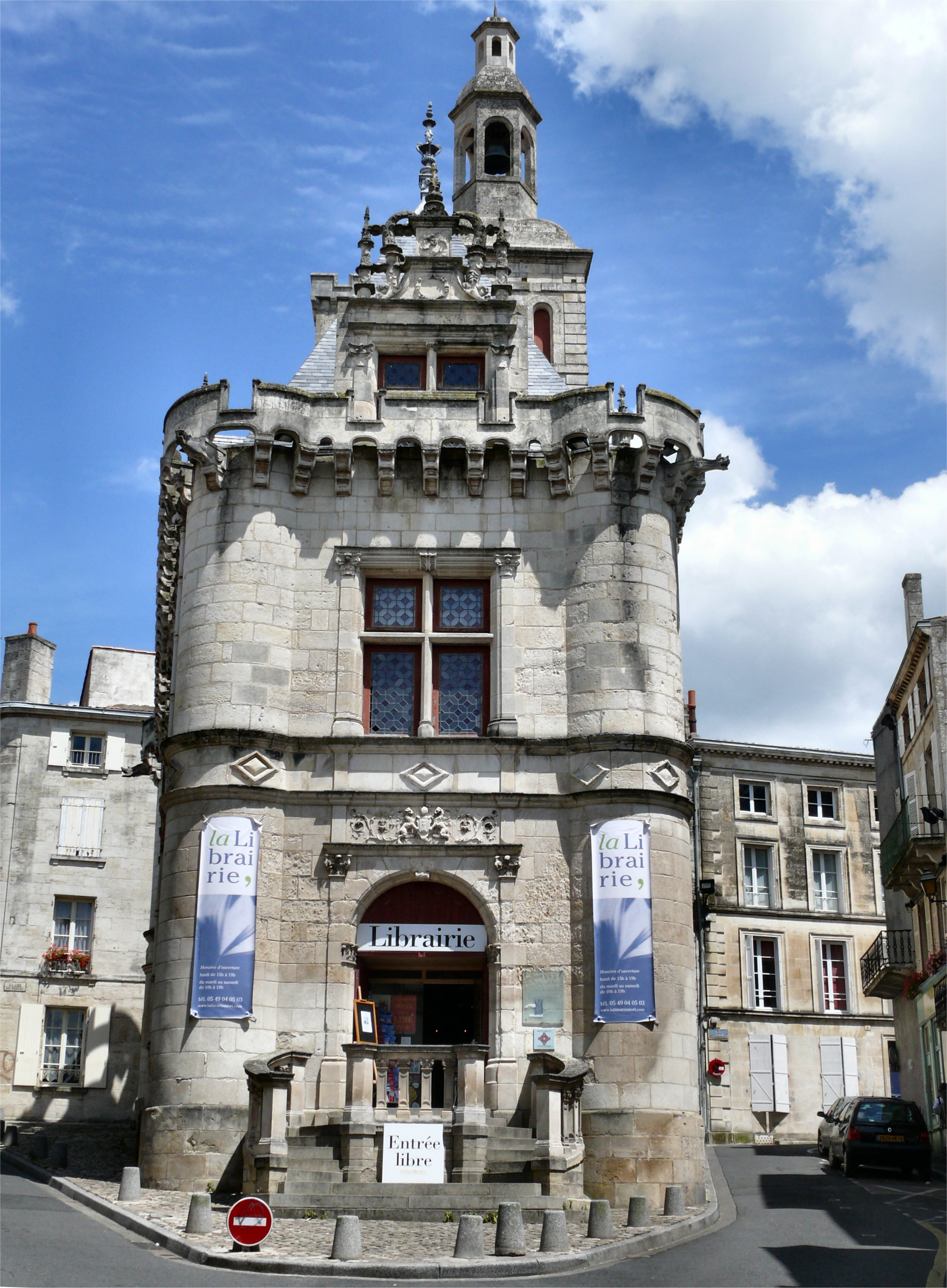
The Pilori (the Pillory) which served as the town hall before the French Revolution

The first town hall in Niort was at the corner of Rue du Rempart and Rue Ricard. The aldermen relocated to an early iteration of the Pilori (the Pillory) in 1370: this square-shaped building, designed in the medieval style, was re-built by the master mason, Mathurin Berthomé, in 1535. After the French Revolution, the council was based at the governor's house in the grounds of the Donjon de Niort.

In the late 19th century, the town council decided to commission a new town hall. The site they selected was occupied by the old Collège de l'Oratoire (College of the Oratory of Jesus), which was established in Niort in 1617. The foundation stone for the new building was laid by the president of France, Félix Faure, on 27 April 1897. It was designed by Georges Lasseron in the Renaissance Revival style, built in ashlar stone and was officially opened by the mayor, Ludovic Martin-Bastard, and the minister of justice, Ernest Monis, over several days between 25 and 28 May 1901.

The design involved a symmetrical main frontage of 11 bays facing onto the market square (now known as Place Martin-Bastard) with the end bays projected forward as pavilions. The central bay featured a round headed opening with a moulded surround and a keystone. The other bays on the ground floor in the central section were fenestrated by round headed windows, while the bays on the first floor were fenestrated with square headed windows. The end bays were fenestrated in a similar style and were surmounted by pyramid-shaped roofs with dormer windows. There were fine carvings between each of the bays on the first floor of the central section and there was a clock, supported by ornate carvings and surmounted by a coat of arms, above the central three bays. A tall octagonal belfry was erected behind the clock. Internally the principal rooms are the Salle du Conseil (council chamber) and the Salle de Mariages (wedding room). The paintings for these rooms were created by Charles Fouqueray.

Following the liberation of the town on 29 August 1944, during the Second World War, a crowd of some 10,000 people assembled outside the town hall to celebrate on 6 September 1944. A member of the French Resistance, Émile Bèche, was proclaimed mayor on the steps of the town hall.

In the early 21st century, two curved annexes were built to the east of the town hall to accommodate the demands for space for extra administrative staff: these buildings were designed by Jean-François Milou, and completed in March 2000. In August 2023, an extensive programme of engineering works, involving the pedestrianisation of the area around the town hall, got underway.
