= Mickaël Brunet =

French footballer (1974–2004)

Personal information
- Full name: Mickaël Brunet
- Date of birth: September 6, 1974
- Place of birth: Niort, France
- Date of death: July 31, 2004 (aged 29)
- Place of death: Limoges, France
- Height: 1.75 m (5 ft 9 in)
- Position: Midfielder

Senior career*
Years	Team	Apps	(Gls)
1993–1997	Chamois Niortais	10	(0)
1997–2004	Limoges	91	(3)
Total		101	(3)
- * Club domestic league appearances and goals

Mickaël Brunet (September 6, 1974 – July 31, 2004) was a footballer. He played as a midfielder and played 10 Ligue 2 matches for Niort.
