= Maisonnay =

- Commune
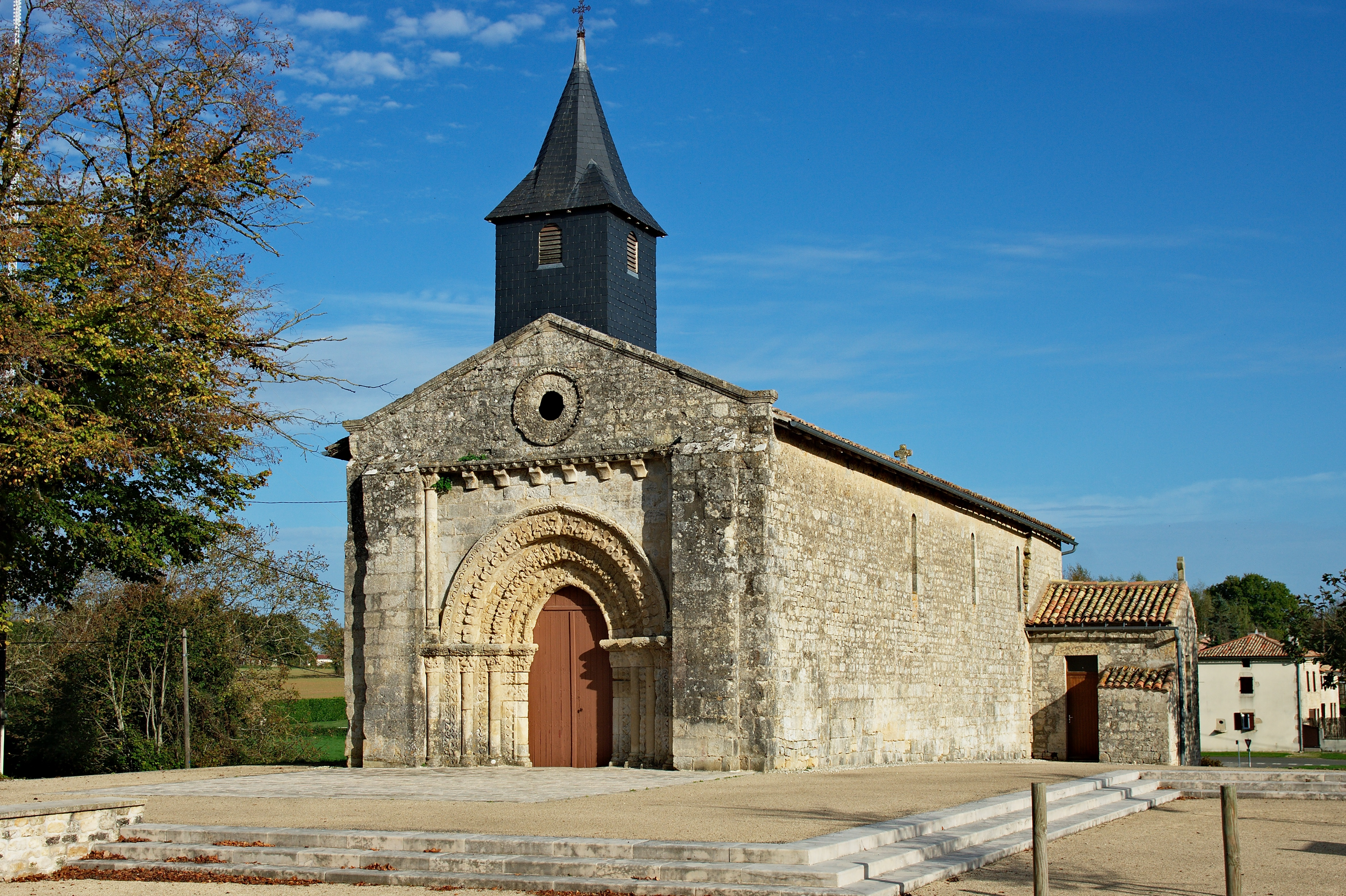
- The church of Our Lady, in Maisonnay
- Location of Maisonnay
- Location within France Location within Nouvelle-Aquitaine
- Coordinates: 46°11′21″N 0°03′36″W
- Country: France
- Region: Nouvelle-Aquitaine
- Department: Deux-Sèvres
- Arrondissement: Niort
- Canton: Melle

Government
  - Mayor (2020–2026): Patrice Guéry
- Area^{1}: 5.17 km^{2} (2.00 sq mi)
- Elevation: 500 m (1,600 ft)
- Highest elevation: 175 m (574 ft)
- Lowest elevation: 145 m (476 ft)
- Population (2023): 252
  - Density: 48.7/km^{2} (126/sq mi)
- Time zone: UTC+01:00 (CET)
  - Summer (DST): UTC+02:00 (CEST)
- INSEE/Postal code: 79164 /79500
- ^{1} French Land Register data, which excludes lakes, ponds, glaciers > 1 km^{2} (0.386 sq mi or 247 acres) and river estuaries.

Maisonnay (French pronunciation: [mɛzɔnɛ]) is a commune in the Deux-Sèvres department in western France.

== See also ==
- TV Mast Niort-Maisonnay
- Communes of the Deux-Sèvres department
